= DC Compact Comics =

DC Comics line of graphic novels

The first 10 DC Compact collection releases

DC Compact Comics is a line of full-color paperbacks from DC Comics. Announced in November 2023, ahead of a June 2024 launch, they were described as "perfect for readers of prose and manga looking to pick up a new-reader-friendly storyline in a self-contained full color graphic novel".

At 5.5" x 8.5" (digest size), they are smaller than the traditional 6.6" x 10.2" of a collected trade paperback comic.

The initial 10 titles released in 2024 were: Batman: The Court of Owls, Watchmen, All-Star Superman, Far Sector, Batman: Hush, Wonder Woman: Earth One, Harley Quinn & The Gotham City Sirens, Joker, American Vampire Book One, and Catwoman: Trail of the Catwoman – with a further 15 books announced for 2025.

One of those 15, Death, a spin-off from the Sandman series, was cancelled following sexual assault allegations against its writer, Neil Gaiman.

As well as being dedicated to a specific character or series, each release is also designated by genre via a tag in the top right of the cover. These genres include science fiction, thriller, horror, fantasy, adventure, and mystery.

== Reception ==
The announcement was largely greeted positively in the comics community with SKTCHD's David Harper saying the line was, "...honestly the best thing to come from one of the Big Two in I don't even know how long". Gordon Jackson at Gizmodo noted that "DC's Compact Comics Line Is the Smartest Thing It's Done in Years". In Comicsbeat, Joe Grunenwald stressed that "the size, price and content are all suitable for mass market".

== Sales ==
Four of 2024's overall top-10 bestselling graphic novels came from DC's Compact Comic line. Batman: The Court of Owls ranked fourth, with All-Star Superman fifth, Batman: Hush sixth, and Watchmen seventh. By June 2025, up to a year after release, only Watchmen had dropped out of the monthly top-ten graphic novel chart.

Meanwhile, new releases continued to launch near the top of the chart. In May 2025, Kingdom Come debuted at number two. A month later, DCeased went into the chart at two, with Superman: Birthright in five. Superman-Batman Vol. 1 was the biggest seller of July 2025, which coincided with the release of DC Studios' Superman movie. Six of the top-ten best-selling graphic novels were Compact Comics.

== Impact ==
The line launched five months ahead of the DC Finest series, which was aimed at a similar market to the Marvel Epic Collection.

In 2025, Marvel Comics released Premier Collection, a similar line of digest-sized 9in x 6in releases "featuring Marvel's most celebrated and prestigious storylines and creators from its entire comic book legacy".

Later the same year, two more companies indicated they would be launching similar lines of digest-sized comics. First, Vault Comics launched their Vantage line, which are the same print size as Compact Comics. The first three will be released in December 2025, but Vault has confirmed that more will be released in a second wave.

Next, IDW Comics solicited a Classic Collection - with Godzilla: Rulers Of Earth, Locke & Key, The Rocketeer, and D4VE, to be released between February and May 2026, as well as an On The Go line for all-ages series such as Sonic the Hedgehog. These books are the same 9in x 6in size as Marvel's Premier Collection.

Other companies to have lines of comics in either compact or premier sizes include Oni Press (Archie, Rick and Morty, Adventure Time, and Skullkickers), Boom! Studios (Mighty Morphin Power Rangers, Jem and the Holograms, and My Little Pony), and Dynamite (Pathfinder and Red Sonja). Image Comics started collecting Invincible in 6in x 9in form before the first DC Compacts books came out, but was arguably inspired by the success of DC's Compacts to start "backpack editions" of Paper Girls and a compact line for Radiant Black.

== List of volumes ==
=== The Authority ===
Title	Years covered	Issues collected	Writers	Artists	Genre	Pages	Pub. date	ISBN
Relentless	1999–2000, 2017	The Authority (vol. 1) #1–12; Planetary/The Authority: Ruling the World #1; "Requiem" from WildStorm: A Celebration of 25 Years	Warren Ellis	Bryan Hitch	Adventure	360	1 Jul 2025	978-1799501992

=== Batgirl ===
Title	Years covered	Issues collected	Writers	Artists	Genre	Pages	Pub. date	ISBN
Batgirl: Year One	2003	Batgirl: Year One #1–9	Chuck Dixon	Scott Beatty	Adventure	224	16 Feb 2027	978-1799513643
Batgirl of Burnside	2014–2015	Batgirl (vol. 4) #35–45, Annual #3; Secret Origins #10; DC Sneak Peek: Batgirl #1	Cameron Stewart, Brenden Fletcher	Babs Tarr	Adventure	312	15 Sep 2026	978-1799508557

=== Batman ===
Title	Years covered	Issues collected	Writers	Artists	Genre	Pages	Pub. date	ISBN
The Dark Knight Returns	1986	Batman: The Dark Knight Returns #1–4	Frank Miller	Frank Miller, Klaus Janson	Thriller	200	7 Apr 2026	978-1799507864
Arkham Asylum	1989	Batman: Arkham Asylum - A Serious House on Serious Earth OGN	Grant Morrison	Dave McKean	Thriller	144	2 Sep 2025	978-1799506997
Gotham by Gaslight	1989	Batman: Gotham by Gaslight #1; Batman: Master of the Future #1	Brian Augustyn	Mike Mignola	Thriller	120	20 Jan 2026	978-1799506652
The Long Halloween	1996–1997	Batman: The Long Halloween #1–13	Jeph Loeb	Tim Sale	Mystery	376	7 Oct 2025	978-1799502883
Hush	2002–2003	Batman (vol.1) #608–619	Jeph Loeb	Jim Lee	Mystery	312	6 Aug 2024	978-1779527264
Under the Red Hood	2005–2006	Batman (vol. 1) #635–641, 645–650, Annual #25	Judd Winick	Doug Mahnke	Adventure	384	16 Jun 2026	978-1799508212
Batman & Son	2006–2007	Batman (vol. 1) #655–658, 663–666	Grant Morrison	Andy Kubert, Jesse Delperdang	Adventure	200	18 Aug 2026	978-1799508793
The Court of Owls Saga	2011–2012	Batman (vol. 2) #1–11	Scott Snyder	Greg Capullo	Thriller	304	4 Jun 2024	978-1779527271
White Knight	2017–2018	Batman: White Knight #1–8	Sean Murphy	Sean Murphy, Matt Hollingsworth	Adventure / Mystery	216	3 Feb 2026	978-1799507413
Batman '89	2021–2022	Batman '89 #1–6	Sam Hamm	Joe Quinones	Adventure	144	3 Aug 2027	978-1799513742

=== Batwoman ===
Title	Years covered	Issues collected	Writers	Artists	Genre	Pages	Pub. date	ISBN
Elegy	2009–2010	Detective Comics #854–863	Greg Rucka	J. H. Williams III	Adventure	240	17 Jun 2025	978-1799501824

=== Catwoman ===
Title	Years covered	Issues collected	Writers	Artists	Genre	Pages	Pub. date	ISBN
Trail Of The Catwoman	2001–2002	Catwoman: Selina's Big Score; Catwoman (vol. 3) #1–9; "Trail of the Catwoman" from Detective Comics #759–762	Darwyn Cooke, Ed Brubaker	Darwyn Cooke	Adventure	336	1 Oct 2024	978-1779527288
When in Rome	2004–2005	Catwoman: When in Rome #1–6	Jeph Loeb	Tim Sale	Crime / Thriller	152	27 Apr 2027	978-1799513674

=== DCeased ===
Title	Years covered	Issues collected	Writers	Artists	Genre	Pages	Pub. date	ISBN
DCeased	2019	DCeased #1–6; DCeased: A Good Day to Die #1	Tom Taylor	Trevor Hairsine	Horror	216	3 Jun 2025	978-1799501633

=== The Flash ===
Title	Years covered	Issues collected	Writers	Artists	Genre	Pages	Pub. date	ISBN
Rebirth	2009–2011	The Flash: Rebirth #1–6; The Flash (vol. 3) #1–7	Geoff Johns	Ethan Van Sciver, Francis Manapul, Scott Kolins	Adventure	352	17 Mar 2026	978-1799507697

=== GCPD ===
Title	Years covered	Issues collected	Writers	Artists	Genre	Pages	Pub. date	ISBN
Gotham Central	2002–2003	Gotham Central #1–10	Ed Brubaker, Greg Rucka	Michael Lark	Adventure	240	19 May 2026	978-1799508076

=== Green Arrow ===
Title	Years covered	Issues collected	Writers	Artists	Genre	Pages	Pub. date	ISBN
Year One	2007	Green Arrow: Year One #1–6	Andy Diggle	Jock	Adventure	152	5 May 2026	978-1799508083

=== Green Lantern ===
Title	Years covered	Issues collected	Writers	Artists	Genre	Pages	Pub. date	ISBN
Rebirth	2004–2005	Green Lantern: Rebirth #1–6; Green Lantern #1–6	Geoff Johns	Ethan Van Sciver, Carlos Pacheco, Darwyn Cooke, Simone Bianchi	Science Fiction / Adventure	352	1 Jun 2027	978-1799513704

=== Harley Quinn ===
Title	Years covered	Issues collected	Writers	Artists	Genre	Pages	Pub. date	ISBN
Harley and Ivy	1994–2004	Batman: Harley and Ivy #1–3, and more: The Batman Adventures Annual #1; The Batman Adventures Holiday Special #1; The Batman and Robin Adventures #8; The Batgirl Adventures #1; Batman: Gotham Knights #14; Batman Black and White #3	Paul Dini	Bruce Timm	Adventure	176	6 Oct 2026	978-1799509301
Harley Quinn and the Gotham City Sirens	2009–2010	Gotham City Sirens #1–13	Paul Dini, Guillem March	Guillem March	Adventure	320	3 Sep 2024	978-1779527301
Wild at Heart	2013–2014	Harley Quinn #0–13	Amanda Conner	Jimmy Palmiotti	Adventure / Comedy	392	16 Sep 2025	978-1799503033

=== Joker ===
Title	Years covered	Issues collected	Writers	Artists	Genre	Pages	Pub. date	ISBN
Joker	2008	Joker	Brian Azzarello	Lee Bermejo	Thriller	136	3 Sep 2024	978-1779527318

=== Justice League / JLA ===
Title	Years covered	Issues collected	Writers	Artists	Genre	Pages	Pub. date	ISBN
The Tower of Babel	1998–2000	JLA #18–21, 32–33, 43–46; two stories from JLA Secret Files and Origins #3	Mark Waid	Howard Porter, Stephen B. Scott, Mark Pajarillo	Adventure	160	29 Jun 2027	978-1799513711
Origin	2011–2012	Justice League (vol. 2) #1–6	Geoff Johns	Jim Lee, Scott Williams	Adventure	160	1 Dec 2026	978-1799509806

=== Mister Miracle ===
Title	Years covered	Issues collected	Writers	Artists	Genre	Pages	Pub. date	ISBN
Mister Miracle	2017–2019	Mister Miracle (vol. 4) #1–12	Tom King	Mitch Gerads	Adventure	312	1 Dec 2026	978-1799509790

=== Nightwing ===
Title	Years covered	Issues collected	Writers	Artists	Genre	Pages	Pub. date	ISBN
Leaping into the Light	2021–2022	Nightwing (vol. 4) #78–83, 87–91; Superman: Son of Kal-El #9	Tom Taylor	Bruno Redondo	Adventure	296	3 Mar 2026	978-1799507703

=== Static ===
Title	Years covered	Issues collected	Writers	Artists	Genre	Pages	Pub. date	ISBN
Season One	2021–2022	Static: Season One #1–6	Vita Ayala, Reginald Hudlin	ChrisCross, Nikolas Draper-Ivey	Adventure	184	27 May 2025	978-1799501541

=== Supergirl ===
Title	Years covered	Issues collected	Writers	Artists	Genre	Pages	Pub. date	ISBN
Woman of Tomorrow	2021–2022	Supergirl: Woman of Tomorrow #1−8	Tom King	Bilquis Evely	Science fiction / Adventure	216	6 Jan 2026	978-1799506904
Woman of Tomorrow	2021–2022	Supergirl: Woman of Tomorrow #1−8	Tom King	Bilquis Evely	Science fiction / Adventure	216	31 Mar 2026	Indigo Canada exclusive edition: 978-1799514336

=== Superman ===
Title	Years covered	Issues collected	Writers	Artists	Genre	Pages	Pub. date	ISBN
Man of Steel	1986	The Man of Steel #1–6	John Byrne	John Byrne, Dick Giordano, Tom Ziuko	Adventure	152	16 Mar 2027	978-1799513650
Red Son	2003	Superman: Red Son #1–3	Mark Millar	Dave Johnson, Killian Plunkett	Adventure / Thriller	152	2 Jun 2026	978-1799508281
Birthright	2003–2004	Superman: Birthright #1–12	Mark Waid	Leinil Francis Yu, Gerry Alanguilan	Adventure	312	24 Jun 2025	978-1799501916
Secret Identity	2004	Superman: Secret Identity #1–4	Kurt Busiek	Stuart Immonen	Adventure / Fantasy	TBA	6 July 2027	978-1799513728
All-Star Superman	2005–2008	All-Star Superman #1–12	Grant Morrison	Frank Quitely	Science fiction / Fantasy	296	2 Jul 2024	978-1779527257
Brainiac	2008	Action Comics #866–870; pages from Superman: New Krypton Special #1	Geoff Johns	Gary Frank	Adventure	128	1 Jun 2027	978-1799519249

=== Superman/Batman ===
Title	Years covered	Issues collected	Writers	Artists	Genre	Pages	Pub. date	ISBN
Book One	2003–2004	Superman/Batman (vol. 1) #1–6, 8–13; "When Clark Met Bruce" from Superman/Batman Secret Files & Origins 2003	Jeph Loeb	Ed McGuinness, Michael Turner	Adventure	304	15 Jul 2025	978-1799502135

=== Swamp Thing ===
Title	Years covered	Issues collected	Writers	Artists	Genre	Pages	Pub. date	ISBN
The Anatomy Lesson	1983–1984	The Saga of the Swamp Thing #20–27	Alan Moore	Stephen Bissette, John Totleben	Horror	200	6 Oct 2026	978-1799509295

=== Wonder Woman ===
Title	Years covered	Issues collected	Writers	Artists	Genre	Pages	Pub. date	ISBN
Blood And Guts	2011–2012	Wonder Woman (vol. 4) #1–12	Brian Azzarello	Cliff Chiang, Tony Akins	Fantasy	280	19 Aug 2025	978-1799502494
Earth One	2016–2021	Wonder Woman: Earth One Vol. 1–3	Grant Morrison	Yanick Paquette	Fantasy	376	6 Aug 2024	978-1779527332
Year One	2016–2017	Wonder Woman (vol. 5) #2, 4, 6, 8, 10, 12, 14, and stories from Annual (vol. 4) #1	Greg Rucka	Nicola Scott, Romulo Fajardo Jr.	Adventure	176	2 Mar 2027	978-1799513667

=== DC Vertigo ===
This section includes series originally published under the Vertigo Comics imprint.

Title	Years covered	Issues collected	Writers	Artists	Genre	Pages	Pub. date	ISBN
Hellblazer: Dangerous Habits	1991–1992	Hellblazer #41–50	Garth Ennis	William Simpson, Steve Dillon, Mike Hoffman	Horror / Thriller	160	13 Apr 2027	978-1799513681
Preacher: Gone to Texas	1995	Preacher #1–7	Garth Ennis	Steve Dillon	Horror	200	5 Jan 2027	978-1799510710
Y: The Last Man: Unmanned	2002–2003	Y: The Last Man #1–10	Brian K. Vaughan	Pia Guerra, José Marzan Jr.	Science fiction / Adventure	248	21 Oct 2025	978-1799502890
Fables: No More Happily Ever After	2002–2003	Fables #1–10	Bill Willingham	Mark Buckingham, Lan Medina	Adventure	248	1 Sep 2026	978-1799509110
American Vampire: Book One	2010–2011	American Vampire #1–11	Scott Snyder, Stephen King	Rafael Albuquerque	Horror	320	1 Oct 2024	978-1779527349
100 Bullets: First Shot, Last Call	2010–2011	Vertigo: Winter's Edge #3; 100 Bullets #1–5	Brian Azzarello	Eduardo Risso	Crime	128	5 Jan 2027	978-1799510703
The Nice House on the Lake	2021–2022	The Nice House on the Lake #1–12	James Tynion IV	Álvaro Martínez Bueno	Horror	184	27 July 2027	978-1799513735

=== Miniseries ===
This section includes books that have self-contained miniseries and are unlikely to have a sequel.

Title	Years covered	Issues collected	Writers	Artists	Genre	Pages	Pub. date	ISBN
Crisis on Infinite Earths	1985–1986	Crisis on Infinite Earths #1–12	Marv Wolfman	George Pérez	Adventure	368	3 Nov 2026	978-1799509608
Dark Nights: Metal	2017–2018	Dark Nights: Metal #1–6; Batman: Lost #1; Dark Knights Rising: The Wild Hunt #1	Scott Snyder	Greg Capullo	Adventure	280	29 Sep 2026	978-1799508809
DC: The New Frontier	2004–2005	DC: The New Frontier #1–6	Darwyn Cooke	Darwyn Cooke, Dave Stewart	Science fiction / Adventure	416	5 Aug 2025	978-1799502340
Far Sector	2019–2021	Far Sector #1–12	Nora Keita Jemisin	Jamal Campbell	Science fiction	296	2 Jul 2024	978-1779527295
Injustice: Gods Among Us: Year One	2013–2014	Injustice: Gods Among Us #1–12, Annual #1	Tom Taylor	Jheremy Raapack, Mike S. Miller	Fantasy / Adventure	416	29 Sep 2026	978-1799508564
Kingdom Come	1996	Kingdom Come #1–4	Mark Waid	Alex Ross	Fantasy	208	6 May 2025	978-1799501299
V For Vendetta	1982–1989	Chapters from Warrior #1–16 and #18–26; V For Vendetta #7–10	Alan Moore	David Lloyd	Thriller	368	4 Nov 2025	978-1799503132
Watchmen	1986–1987	Watchmen #1–12	Alan Moore	Dave Gibbons	Thriller	416	4 Jun 2024	978-1779527325
We3	2004	We3 #1–3	Grant Morrison	Frank Quitely	Science fiction / Adventure	144	18 Nov 2025	978-1799503255

=== DC Compact Comics Adventures ===
A sub-series of collected editions of all-ages comics, in the same size format and priced at 7.99 USD. Instead of a genre indicator, Bat-Mite is featured on the trade dress.

Title	Years covered	Issues collected	Writers	Artists	Pages	Pub. date	ISBN
Batman: The Dark Knight	1992–1993	The Batman Adventures #1–6	Kelly Puckett, Martin Pasko	Ty Templeton, Rick Burchett, Rick Taylor	152	30 Mar 2027	978-1799517146
Superman: The Man of Tomorrow	1996–1997	Superman Adventures #1–6	Paul Dini, Scott McCloud	Rick Burchett	152	30 Mar 2027	978-1799517153
Justice League: Heroes United	2004–2005	Justice League Unlimited #1–7	Adam Beechen	Carlo Barberi	208	29 Jun 2027	978-1799517160
Teen Titans Go!: Truth, Justice, Pizza	2004	Teen Titans Go! #1–6	J. Torres	Todd Nauck	144	29 Jun 2027	978-1799517177

== Upcoming releases ==
Title	Pub. date	ISBN
Mister Miracle	1 Dec 2026	978-1799509790
Justice League: Origin	1 Dec 2026	978-1799509806
100 Bullets: First Shot, Last Call	5 Jan 2027	978-1799510703
Preacher: Gone to Texas	5 Jan 2027	978-1799510710
Batgirl: Year One	16 Feb 2027	978-1799513643
Wonder Woman: Year One	2 Mar 2027	978-1799513667
Superman: Man of Steel	16 Mar 2027	978-1799513650
Batman: The Dark Knight	30 Mar 2027	978-1799517146
Superman: The Man of Tomorrow	30 Mar 2027	978-1799517153
John Constantine, Hellblazer: Dangerous Habits	13 Apr 2027	978-1799513681
Catwoman: When in Rome	27 Apr 2027	978-1799513674
Green Lantern: Rebirth	1 Jun 2027	978-1799513704
Superman: Brainiac	1 Jun 2027	978-1799519249
JLA: The Tower of Babel	29 Jun 2027	978-1799513711
Justice League: Heroes United	29 Jun 2027	978-1799517160
Teen Titans Go!: Truth, Justice, Pizza	29 Jun 2027	978-1799517177
Superman: Secret Identity	6 July 2027	978-1799513728
The Nice House on the Lake	27 July 2027	978-1799513735
Batman '89	3 Aug 2027	978-1799513742

== Cancelled ==
Title	ISBN
Death	978-1799502647

== See also ==
- DC Finest
- DC Omnibus
- DC Compendium
- Marvel Premier Collection
- Marvel Omnibus
- Marvel Epic Collection
- Marvel Complete Collections
