= Barbara Ciardo =

- Born: Barbara Ciardo; October 30, 1983 (age 43) Naples, Italy
- Area: Colourist
- Notable works: Superman: Earth One; Wednesday Comics; Secret Invasion:Front Line; She-Hulk

Barbara Ciardo (born October 30, 1983, Naples) is an Italian illustrator and comic book colorist mainly active in Italian, American and French markets.

== Career ==
In 2004 she started working on some series of the Italian publisher GG Studio: Route Des Maisons Rouges, P'n'P, Mediterranea and The Bodysnatchers. Some of them have also been published in the United States.

In 2006 she was hired by Wildstorm to color the first two covers of a miniseries based on the movie The Texas Chainsaw Massacre, both penciled by artist Lee Bermejo. In 2007 for The Walt Disney Company she worked on the coloring of the series based on the movie High School Musical published on the official HSM magazine that was translated and distributed in about 30 countries. A year later Ciardo got in touch with Marvel Comics during the "Chester Quest" an international talent search done by C. B. Cebulski and she was chosen to be the colorist on two miniseries, She-Hulk and Secret Invasion: Front Line. After that for Top Cow she colored Witchblade #125 Augury a backup story penciled by Marco Castiello and written by Rob Levin.

During 2009 she joined Lee Bermejo coloring a Superman story by John Arcudi published on DC Comics' Wednesday Comics. The book including 15 stories from various artists gave Mark Chiarello, the editor responsible, a Harvey Award for Best Anthology 2010. The single Superman story was chosen to be weekly published on the USA Today website. In 2009 she worked as an assistant colorist for publisher Soleil on some pages of "Cixi De Troy: Le Secret De Cixi" issue #1, book related to the series Lanfeust of Troy.

Between 2009 and 2010 she colored for Marvel Comics the short story "Head Space" penciled by Emma Rios, written by Devin K. Grayson and published on Girl Comics#1. In 2010 she was called to be the colorist on the graphic novel Superman: Earth One written by J. Michael Straczynski, penciled by Shane Davis and inked by Sandra Hope. The first printing of the book published in October 2010, quickly sold out and the book gained the first position on The New York Times Best Sellers list in the "Hardcover Graphic Books" section.

== Bibliography ==
Color work includes:

=== DC ===
- Before Watchmen: Rorschach #1-2-3-4 (2012)
- Superman: Earth One vol.2 (2012)
- The Authority, vol. 4, #23-24 (covers, 2010)
- Batman #700 (colors on internal image by Shane Davis) (2010)
- Batman: Noël, graphic novel (2011)
- Brightest Day Aftermath: The Search For Swamp Thing, miniseries, #1-3 (2011)
- Bruce Wayne: The Road Home: Batman and Robin, Red Robin, Batgirl, Outsiders, Catwoman, Commissioner Gordon, Oracle, Ra's al Ghul (covers, 2010)
- Green Arrow, vol. 4, #9 (variant cover, 2010)
- Green Lantern, vol. 4, #52, 54 (covers only, 2010)
- Jonah Hex, vol. 2, #64 (cover, 2010)
- Justice League of America 80-Page Giant (2011)
- Justice Society of America #43-47 (covers only, 2010)
- Superman: Earth One vol.1 (2010)
- The Texas Chainsaw Massacre #1-2 (covers, 2006)
- Wednesday Comics, limited series, #1-12 (2009)

=== GG Studio ===
- Route Des Maisons Rouges #1-3 (2006)
- P'n'P #0-2 (2006)
- Mediterranea #1 (2008)
- The Bodysnatchers #1 (2008)

=== Marvel ===
- Secret Invasion Front Line, miniseries, #1-5 (2008)
- She-Hulk, vol. 2, #31-36 (2008)
- Girl Comics ("Cyclops, Jean Grey & Wolverine") #1 (2010)

=== Other publishers ===
- Dylan Dog Color Fest #7 (cover) (Sergio Bonelli)
- High School Musical: Lasting impressions (Disney, 2008)
- Speciale Einstein (Wired, 2010)
- Witchblade #125 (Image, 2009)
