= Batman: Damned =

American comic book

- Cover art of Batman: Damned #1 (November 2018), art by Lee Bermejo.

Publication information
- Publisher: DC Comics
- Format: Limited series
- Genre: Superhero, horror
- Publication date: September 2018 – June 2019
- No. of issues: 3
- Main character(s): Batman; John Constantine

Creative team
- Written by: Brian Azzarello
- Artist: Lee Bermejo

Batman: Damned is an American comic book series published by DC Comics. The three-issue limited series, written by Brian Azzarello and illustrated by Lee Bermejo, began on September 19, 2018 and concluded on June 26, 2019. The series experienced numerous delays throughout its run, with the third issue being rescheduled a total of five times. Damned was the first series published under the DC Black Label, an imprint allowing writers to present unique takes on DC characters for a mature audience, and Azzarello and Bermejo described it as a loose sequel to their 2008 graphic novel Joker.

A supernatural horror story, Damned is set in Gotham City outside the continuity of the mainstream DC Universe. The series begins shortly after the events of Joker, when the criminal Joker seemingly dies during a fight with his archenemy, the superhero Batman, who has no recollection of the event. Batman enlists the help of blue-collar exorcist John Constantine, and the two delve into Gotham's supernatural underworld to solve the mystery. During their investigation, they meet many of DC's magic-based characters, including the Spectre, Etrigan, Deadman, Zatanna, the Swamp Thing, and the Enchantress. Damned sold well and received positive reviews. Critics praised Bermejo's art, though opinions regarding the story were mixed. The series also became subject to controversy due to a scene in the first issue featuring male full frontal nudity, the allowance of which led to editorial shakeups at DC.

== Publication history ==
=== Development ===
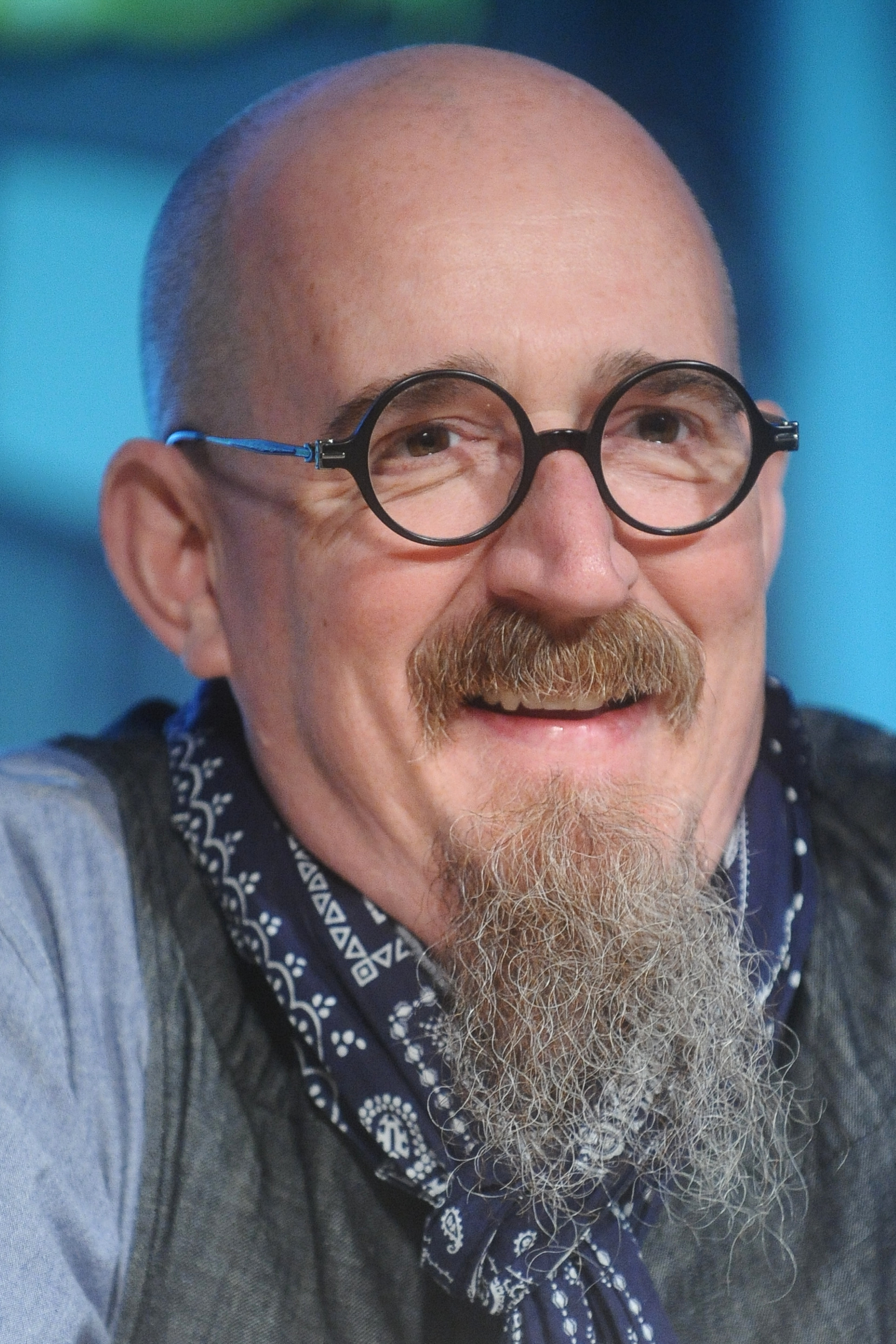
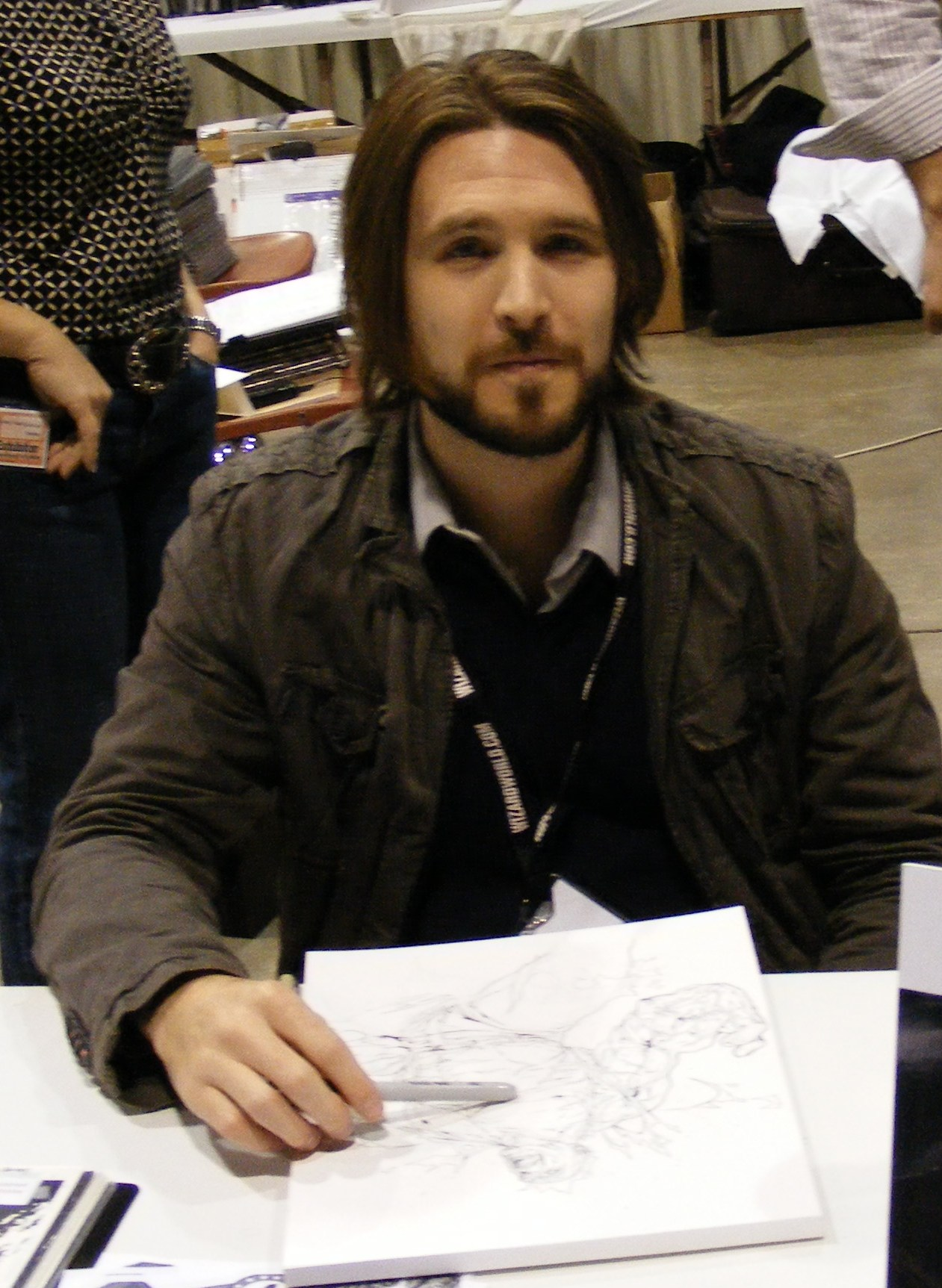
Brian Azzarello and Lee Bermejo, the writer and illustrator of Batman: Damned.

Batman: Damned was written by Brian Azzarello and illustrated by Lee Bermejo, who had previously collaborated to produce the villain-centric comics Lex Luthor: Man of Steel (2005) and Joker (2008). It was the first title of publisher DC Comics' Black Label—an imprint designed to allow writers to present unique takes on traditional DC Universe (DCU) characters for a mature audience—and was announced alongside the line in March 2018. Bermejo and Jim Lee contributed cover art. Bermejo said the project came about as a result of Joker: "Every time we do a project, that project leads us to the next project we're going to do together. Even if we don't know it right away". Similarly, Azzarello described Damned as a quasi-sequel to Joker. He said one did not have to read Joker to understand Damned, but if they read both they would see connections. The series' narrative is a reverse of Joker's. In Joker, Batman was not physically present until the final pages but nonetheless plays a significant role; conversely, in Damned, the Joker only appears at the beginning but remains a narrative driving force.

Talks of a Joker sequel began after the graphic novel's release in 2008. According to Azzarello, Joker sold significantly better than DC expected. This caught the company off-guard, as it "had nothing like it to follow it with". Editors Will Dennis and Mark Doyle discussed ideas for a potential follow-up with Azzarello, which soon developed into "Jokerverse" and eventually Black Label, but after the R-rated DC film Watchmen (2009) underperformed at the box office, DC's corporate sibling Warner Bros. became opposed to producing superhero fiction for a mature audience, and development halted. The project was revived as Azzarello and Bermejo were working on a crossover featuring Batman and the Justice League Dark. Azzarello struggled to write a story when Lee suggested to launch Black Label with it. Damned was Azzarello's second Batman story that took over a decade to produce, following Batman: Europa (2016).

Azzarello and Bermejo sought to restore a sense of vulnerability to Batman in Damned. Bermejo noted that modern interpretations of the character depict him as someone who is always ready, which renders his human side absent. They had grown tired of this and wanted to reverse what Bermejo called "'Robocop'-ification". Azzarello described Damned's Batman as a fish out of water; while the story is about him, he has no control over it. The duo wanted Batman to be in a new, unusual situation within the story. He also thought that "if ... someone else has the upper hand on [Batman], it completely changes the dynamic of the story... he's suddenly a way more interesting character". Azzarello realized during the initial discussions for Damned that John Constantine needed to be part of the story, and chose him as narrator because he would leave Batman confused. The series' depiction of Constantine is more in line with his original portrayal in the DC Vertigo series Hellblazer (1988—2020), in which he was depicted as a foul-mouthed conman, than his recent, family-friendly appearances in the DC Universe. Azzarello, who wrote many issues of Hellblazer, believed the maturity was an essential part of the character.

DC set up this imprint. 'Take our characters, do something mature'. When that opportunity was given to us, we decided, let's not half-ass this. Let's go all the way. We'll either go down in a blaze of glory or we hit the ball.

— Brian Azzarello

Damned allowed Azzarello and Bermejo to showcase their interpretations of DC's supernatural characters, such as the Spectre, Etrigan, Deadman, Zatanna, and Swamp Thing. Azzarello said Deadman in particular was fun to write. He changed Deadman's abilities so he could only possess bodies for a short time and, similar to a person suffering from addiction, constantly searches for a new host. With Etrigan, the duo replaced his iambic pentameter speech rhythm with one inspired by hip-hop music. Azzarello and Bermejo named Logic, Nas, Kool Keith, Camp Lo, and Run the Jewels as inspiration. The characters have their own "visual language" to make it clear when they are present; for instance, in the second issue the color palette changes when Etrigan is present. The duo said their approach to magic in the story was like 1970s horror or a Dario Argento film such as Suspiria (1977), rather than an effects-driven film.

Each page took Bermejo around three or four days to complete. Because he colored it himself, it made production longer than the average comic. Bermejo was inspired by photography, such as the book Uncle Charlie by Marc Asnin, and said that while the art is in his traditional style, he thought it was more colorful than people would expect. Azzarello waited to see the finished page so he could write the script, as Bermejo's art sometimes inspired dialogue changes. Damned was printed on wide paper with a matte texture cover, which Bermejo thought was ideal for his style. The letterer, Jared K. Fletcher, "came up with really, really interesting font" featuring free-floating captions and changing sizes, which Azzarello said helped the series stand out.

=== Publication ===
The physical editions of Damned were published as prestige format comics, which are square-bound, larger than normal comics, and have higher-quality paper. DC published the first issue of Damned on September 19, 2018, with a cover date of November. The following issues experienced numerous delays. The second issue was initially scheduled to be released on November 21, but was delayed to December 5 that September so Bermejo could redraw four pages. In November, it was delayed again to December 12. Meanwhile, the third issue was rescheduled a total of five times. It was initially slated for release in January 2019, before being pushed to March 13. In February, DC canceled all orders of the issue before announcing it would release on May 22, but was later delayed to June 19, then again until June 26. A hardcover collected edition was released on September 4, 2019.

== Synopsis ==
=== Setting and characters ===
A supernatural horror story, Batman: Damned is set in Gotham City in a grim, darker version of the DCU. The series' protagonist is Bruce Wayne, who witnessed the murder of his parents, Thomas and Martha Wayne, as a child. This inspired him to become Batman, a masked superhero, to fight crime. Damned's depiction of Batman is similar to his canon DCU counterpart, but he is tormented by the demonic witch the Enchantress, who visits him as a child and continues to speak to him as an adult. At the beginning of the story, Batman engages in a violent fight with his archenemy, the sadistic Joker, that ends with Joker's death, and is unable to remember what happened. Batman is guided by John Constantine, a foul-mouthed con man, exorcist and magician. Constantine is the narrator and Batman's foil, serving as the bridge between what Batman knows and what he does not.

In addition to traditional Batman supporting characters cast members James Gordon and Harley Quinn, Damned features many of DC's supernatural characters, such as the Spectre, Etrigan, Deadman, Zatanna, and the Swamp Thing. While remaining faithful to their DCU counterparts, some characters have key differences; Jim Johnson of Comic Book Resources wrote that the series takes "unfamiliar approaches to otherwise familiar characters". Recent incarnations of Harley have depicted her as heroic, but Damned depicts her as villainous. Out of grief over the Joker's death, she adopts aspects of his appearance, including dying her hair green, adorning makeup resembling him and wearing his traditional purple suit. Meanwhile, in the world of Damned, Etrigan is a rapper named J. Blood who performs at a nightclub called the Cavern, and Deadman, the ghost of a man named Boston Brand, communicates by temporarily possessing individuals, leaving them terribly ill when he vacates their bodies. The Spectre, an agent of Heaven, is represented by a rambling homeless man in a green hood, who appears as a figure of judgment.

=== Plot ===
During a fight (immediately following the finale of Joker), Batman and the Joker fall off the Gotham Gate Bridge. The Joker seemingly dies, while Batman is knocked unconscious and awakens in an ambulance. Batman fights the emergency medical technicians and runs off, only to collapse in a street. Constantine rescues Batman and brings him to a hotel room. There, Batman learns of the situation from the news. He fears he may have murdered the Joker and Constantine offers to form an alliance. Batman returns to the bridge to investigate, where a homeless man claims to have seen the devil kill the Joker. The man disappears before Batman can question him.

Flashbacks reveal that when Bruce was a child, his mother, Martha, discovered that his father, Thomas, had had an affair with another woman. While Bruce played outside, Thomas and Martha got in a fight, resulting in Thomas driving away. Bruce fired a cap gun at Martha's face and she made Bruce promise to never point a gun at anyone. Batman's memories of these events become plagued by the Enchantress, who implies that he had a hand in the Joker's death and offers to make a deal to rid him of fear. In the present, Batman goes to the Batcave and hallucinates that his suit is attacking him. While Batman observes Gotham street activity, Deadman appears and warns him of dark forces that plan to oppose him.

Batman and Constantine meet at a church, where a statue of Jesus has been desecrated with a painting of the Joker's smile. Batman begins to doubt that the Joker really died, while Constantine encourages him to seek out Etrigan for information. Batman finds Etrigan at the Cavern and fights through the crowd to confront him. Etrigan, angry for being interrupted during a performance, orders the crowd to point firearms at Batman. Suddenly, an explosion destroys the building and the Bat-Signal, desecrated with the Joker's smile, lights up the sky. Etrigan saves Batman, but tells Constantine that he only did so in order for Batman to experience more suffering.

It is revealed that the bombing was orchestrated by Harley Quinn, who is unable to cope with the Joker's death. Batman confronts Harley, who beats him with a baseball bat, injects him with a drug that paralyzes him and attempts to rape him. Batman, however, manages to gain the upper hand and, possessed by the Enchantress, strangles her against the Bat-Signal. Later, Batman awakens trapped inside a coffin underground, but is rescued by the Swamp Thing. Constantine arrives and talks to the Swamp Thing before the Enchantress appears and Batman defeats her.

Constantine takes Batman to meet Zatanna at a club for magic-based patrons and she uses a spell to send them into a vision of the night when Bruce's parents were murdered by Joe Chill, where it appears that the young Bruce was also shot in the alley. He seemingly sold his soul to the Enchantress to become the Batman. The Enchantress attempts to seal her deal with Bruce, but Constantine shoots and kills the witch with Chill's pistol. Constantine explains that the dead Bruce represents Batman's past, of which he implores Batman to let go. Batman and Constantine part ways as Batman goes to the morgue, where the homeless man, an incarnation of the heavenly judgment figure known as the Spectre, reveals the truth of the incident on the bridge; Batman was fatally stabbed by the Joker and consciously allowed the Joker to fall to his death, fearing what would become of Gotham if he was not there to stop the Joker. Batman, realising he has been dead this whole time, exchanges places with the body in the morgue and dissipates. A living Joker then emerges from the river underneath the bridge, while Constantine implies that this is the start of a new chapter.

== Reception ==
Batman: Damned received positive reviews from critics. On Comic Book Roundup, a comic book review aggregator, the series holds an average rating of 7.5/10 based on 81 reviews. The series sold well; the initial print run of the first issue sold out and the second issue received more preorders than the first, a rarity in the comics industry. The third issue, despite delays and a lack of publicity, was also a bestseller.

=== Nudity controversy ===
The first issue of Damned features a scene in which Batman goes to the Batcave to analyze injuries he suffered earlier in the story. The scene generated controversy because some panels depict Batman's penis for the first time. The nudity is only present in physical printings and was censored in the digital version. Around 115,000 uncensored copies were published. DC co-publishers Jim Lee and Dan DiDio attributed the lack of censorship to production errors; the colors had to be brightened to make the scene more visible, which, in turn, caused Batman's penis to become noticeable. According to Noah Dominguez of Comic Book Resources, while some readers accepted the scene for humanizing Batman, it left others uncomfortable. The scene soon became subject to online ridicule, and late night talk show hosts Seth Meyers and Stephen Colbert made jokes about it.

While the controversy caused the issue's initial print run to sell out, it was embarrassing for DC and led to turmoil within the company. DC parent TimeWarner had just merged with AT&T, and as a result, pursued a "family friendly and corporate" product at the time of Damned's release. DiDio said the controversy "really took the attention away from what we thought was quality storytelling". DC decided to remove the nudity from future printings, causing prices of uncensored copies to skyrocket, and "rethink who they are as a company". Editorial changes following the controversy, out of fear of a repeat, led to development on other Black Label titles halting and the cancellation of the religious satire Second Coming. DC also made the second issue of Damned returnable, and the controversy led to the series receiving minimal promotion.

DC's rationale that the nudity was unnecessary for the story was met with criticism from journalists, who felt it conflicted with the mature nature of Black Label comics. For instance, Eric Francisco of Inverse argued that many ignored the context of the scene, while Alex Abad-Santos of Vox said the removal "[brought] to mind some of the egregiously risqué female costumes in mainstream comics that don't seem 'additive' to the story beyond providing titillating thrills". Susana Polo of Polygon criticized the outrage as unjustified and overblown, finding the nudity barely visible. Bermejo called the debacle the biggest non-controversy in comics history. He claimed that DC mistreated him and Azzarello following the controversy, including unusual encounters with other DC employees and Bermejo constantly having to redraw artwork due to editorial interference.
