= Dragon (comics) =

Dragon, in comics, may refer to:

- Dragon, the leading character in the Image Comics title Savage Dragon
- Dragon (DC Comics), a DC Comics character
- Dragon, a member of Gen13
- Dragon Comics, a Japanese comic magazine
- Richard Dragon, a Marvel Comics character
- Dragon Man (character), a Marvel Comics character

It may also refer to:

- Dragon Ball (manga), a Japanese manga series
- Dragon's Claws, a Marvel UK title
- Dragon Lady Press, a comics publisher
- Dragon Lord (character), a number of Marvel Comics characters
- Dragonmage, a DC Comics character
- Dragon Prince (comics)
- Dragon Shiryū, a Saint Seiya character
- Black Dragon Society (comics)
- Crouching Tiger, Hidden Dragon (comics)
- Red Dragon (comics), a number of characters
- Savage Dragon, an Image Comics character
- She-Dragon, an Image Comics character
- Malcolm Dragon, an Image Comics character

== See also ==
- Dragon (disambiguation)
