= Broken City (disambiguation) =

Broken City is a 2013 American crime film starring Mark Wahlberg and Russell Crowe.

Broken City may also refer to:

- "Broken City" (comics), a 2003–2004 Batman storyline
- "Broken City", a song by Audioslave from Revelations
- Broken City, a competitive indoor percussion group from Lake Elsinore, CA that competes in Percussion Independent World (PIW) class in WGI competition.

== See also ==
- This Broken City, an EP by Vedera
