= Brian Azzarello =

American comic book writer

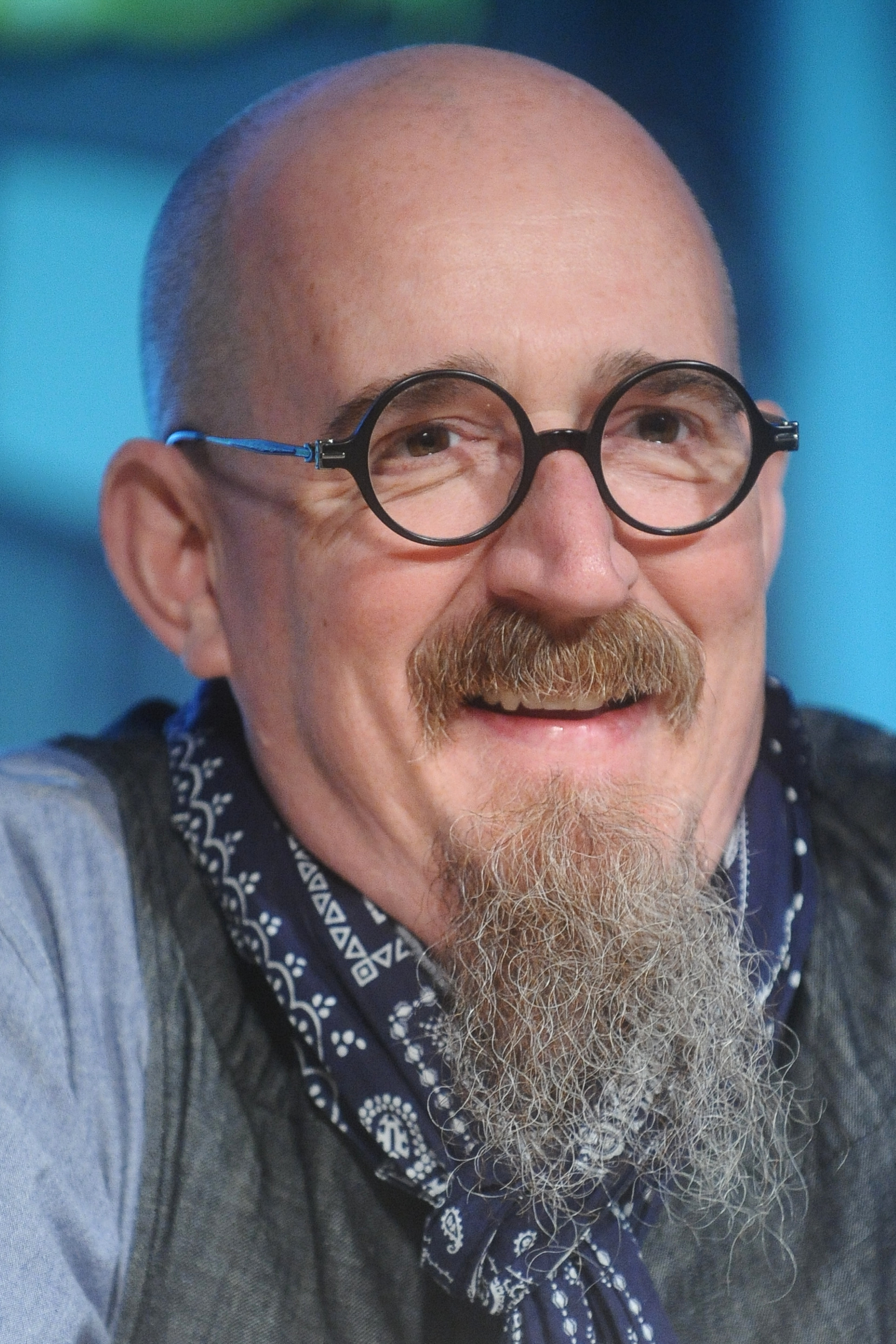
- Azzarello at Lucca Comics & Games 2016
- Born: August 11, 1962 (age 64) Cleveland, Ohio, U.S.
- Area: Writer
- Notable works: 100 Bullets; Before Watchmen: Comedian / Rorschach; Hellblazer; Joker; Lex Luthor: Man of Steel; Loveless; Wonder Woman
- Awards: Eisner Award (2001)

Brian Azzarello (born August 11, 1962) is an American comic book writer and screenwriter who first came to prominence with the hardboiled crime series 100 Bullets, published by DC Comics' mature-audience imprint Vertigo. Azzarello is best known for his numerous collaborations with artists Eduardo Risso (100 Bullets, Batman: Broken City, Spaceman, Moonshine) and Lee Bermejo (Batman/Deathblow, Luthor, Joker, Batman: Damned), his contributions to the Watchmen prequel project Before Watchmen and The Dark Knight Returns sequel series DK III: The Master Race, as well as for his stints on the long-running Vertigo series Hellblazer and The New 52 relaunch of the Wonder Woman title.

== Early life ==
Azzarello grew up in Cleveland Heights, Ohio, where his mother managed a restaurant and his father was a salesman. As a child, he read monster and war comic books, but avoided the superhero genre. He attended the Cleveland Institute of Art, studying painting and printmaking. In 1989, after several years of working various blue-collar jobs, Azzarello moved to Chicago, where he became interested in the work of Black Lizard Press, a small publishing house which reprinted hardboiled detective and noir fiction. He also met his future wife Jill Thompson, a comic book artist who was working for DC Comics's imprint Vertigo.

== Career ==
Azzarello began working in comics in 1992, joining Comico as the production coordinator. He was soon promoted to managing editor, before becoming Editor-in-Chief—or, as he was often credited, "line editor"—the position he held from 1993 until the company's demise in 1997. During this period, Azzarello's wife Jill Thompson introduced him to Lou Stathis, an editor at DC Comics' Vertigo who wanted to move away from the light fantasy stories the imprint was known for at the time, and Azzarello was eventually hired as a writer. He contributed short stories to a number of Vertigo's anthology titles and penned Jonny Double, a 4-issue limited series which marked his first collaboration with Argentine artist Eduardo Risso. In August 1999, Azzarello and Risso launched 100 Bullets, a hardboiled noir series for Vertigo. The series ran for one hundred issues, from 1999 to 2009, and was noted for Azzarello's use of regional and local accents, as well as the frequent use of slang and oblique, metaphorical language in his characters' dialogue. Azzarello's other work for Vertigo includes a run on Hellblazer, the 2005 western series Loveless with artist Marcelo Frusin and an original graphic novel Filthy Rich, one of the two titles that launched the Vertigo Crime line in 2009.

In 2003, Azzarello was assigned to write arcs for DC Comics' Batman and Superman, commenting to Chicago Tribune, "DC is giving me the keys to both cars in the garage, the Maserati and the Ferrari... Somebody told me, 'Don't drive drunk.'" The results were the 6-issue Batman: Broken City and the 12-issue "Superman: For Tomorrow", which was supposed to be the centerpiece of a larger storyline consisting of several interconnected mini-series, including one written by Azzarello, Lex Luthor: Man of Steel. The initiative, unofficially dubbed "Superstorm" due to the fact that the mini-series were edited by the team of DC's Wildstorm imprint, experienced production problems and delays, causing Luthor to become a standalone work only loosely connected to "For Tomorrow". In the following years, Azzarello continued to write more Batman-related stories such as the 2008 graphic novel Joker, a serial for Wednesday Comics in 2009 and Flashpoint: Batman — Knight of Vengeance. In April 2015, Azzarello was announced as the co-writer of an eight-issue sequel to The Dark Knight Returns, titled The Dark Knight III: The Master Race, with Frank Miller and artist Andy Kubert. The series, released bi-monthly, was launched in late 2015. Azzarello's most recent Batman work was the Batman: Damned three-issue series for the DC Black Label imprint with artist Lee Bermejo.

Azzarello was one of the architects of First Wave, a new publishing line for pulp characters then-recently acquired by DC Comics, set outside the main DC continuity. He wrote the opening one-shot for the line, Batman/Doc Savage, continuing with the First Wave limited series. In 2011, Azzarello spearheaded The New 52 relaunch of the Wonder Woman series with artist Cliff Chiang. The pair stayed on the title until issue #35 (Dec. 2014). In 2012, Azzarello wrote two limited series for the Before Watchmen project, focusing on Comedian and Rorschach. In 2014, Azzarello became the co-writer of the weekly series The New 52: Futures End along with Jeff Lemire, Keith Giffen and Dan Jurgens.

In 2016, Azzarello launched the 12-issue maxi-series Moonshine with frequent collaborator Eduardo Risso at Image. In 2019, the series resumed publication with issue #13 as an ongoing title. The series lasted for 28 issues, ending in 2021.

== Awards ==
Azzarello and Risso won the 2001 Eisner Award for Best Serialized Story in 100 Bullets #15–18: "Hang Up on the Hang Low".

== Influences ==
Azzarello cites Jim Thompson and David Goodis among his influences.

== Personal life ==
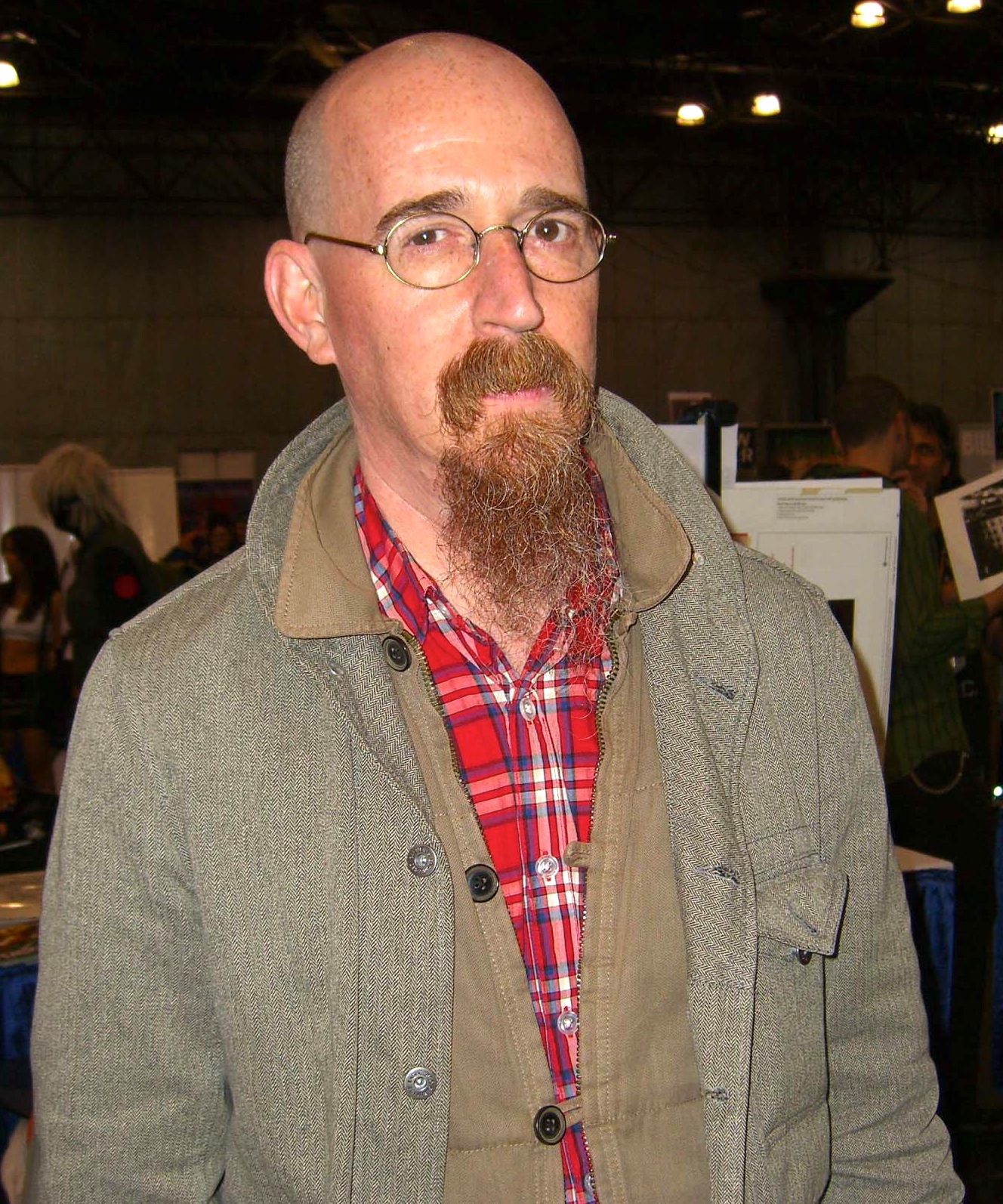
Azzarello in 2011

Azzarello was married to fellow comic book creator Jill Thompson. The couple resided in Chicago. In a 2021 interview on the Word Balloon podcast, Azzarello mentioned that he was no longer married to Thompson.

The character "666" from Mark Waid and Alex Ross' 1996 mini-series Kingdom Come is physically modeled after Azzarello.

== Bibliography ==
=== Early work ===
- Northstar:
  - Slash #1: "Mega Mounds and the All-Nighter" (with Nathan Loggins, anthology, 1992)
  - Cold Blooded #1: "An Undead Evolution" (1-page prose story illustrated by Kyle Hotz, 1993)
- Comico:
  - Lady Bathory:
    - Overstreet's Fan #7–9: "Thicker Than Water" (with Jim Callahan, co-feature, Gemstone, 1995–1996)
    - Primer vol. 2 #1: "The Assassin's Song" (with Vincent Proce, anthology — cancelled after one issue, 1996)
  - Red Dragon #1: "Enter Red Dragon" (with Tony Akins, cancelled after one issue, 1996)

=== DC Comics ===
==== Vertigo ====
- Weird War Tales vol. 2 #1: "Ares" (with James Romberger, anthology, 1997)
- Gangland #1: "Clean House" (with Tim Bradstreet, anthology, 1998) collected in Gangland (tpb, 112 pages, 2000, ISBN 1-56389-608-7)
- Jonny Double #1–4 (with Eduardo Risso, 1998) collected as Jonny Double: Two-Finger Discount (tpb, 104 pages, 2002, ISBN 1-56389-815-2)
- Heart Throbs vol. 2 #2: "The Other Side of Town" (with Tim Bradstreet, anthology, 1999)
- Flinch (anthology):
  - Book One (tpb, 192 pages, 2015, ISBN 1-4012-5812-3) includes:
    - "Food Chain" (with Eduardo Risso, in #2, 1999)
  - Book Two (tpb, 192 pages, 2016, ISBN 1-4012-6139-6) includes:
    - "Last Call" (with Danijel Žeželj, in #10, 2000)
    - "The Shaft" (with Javier Pulido, in #13, 2000)
- 100 Bullets (with Eduardo Risso):
  - 100 Bullets (1999–2009) collected as:
    - Book One (collects #1–19, hc, 456 pages, 2011, ISBN 1-4012-3201-9; tpb, 2014, ISBN 1-4012-5056-4)
      - Includes the "Silencer Night" short story (art by Eduardo Risso) from Vertigo: Winter's Edge #3 (anthology, 2000)
    - Book Two (collects #20–36, hc, 416 pages, 2012, ISBN 1-4012-3372-4; tpb, 2015, ISBN 1-4012-5431-4)
    - Book Three (collects #37–58, hc, 512 pages, 2012, ISBN 1-4012-3729-0; tpb, 2015, ISBN 1-4012-5795-X)
    - Book Four (collects #59–80, hc, 512 pages, 2013, ISBN 1-4012-3807-6; tpb, 2016, ISBN 1-4012-5794-1)
    - Book Five (collects #81–100, hc, 512 pages, 2013, ISBN 1-4012-4271-5; tpb, 2016, ISBN 1-4012-6133-7)
  - 100 Bullets: Brother Lono #1–8 (2013–2014) collected as 100 Bullets: Brother Lono (tpb, 192 pages, 2014, ISBN 1-4012-4506-4)
- Strange Adventures vol. 2 #4: "Native Tongue" (with Esad Ribić, anthology, 2000)
- Hellblazer (with Richard Corben, Marcelo Frusin, Steve Dillon (#157), Guy Davis (#162–163) and Giuseppe Camuncoli (#168–169), 2000–2002; with Rafael Grampá, 2009) collected as:
  - John Constantine, Hellblazer Volume 14 (collects #146–161, tpb, 384 pages, 2016, ISBN 1-4012-6373-9)
    - Includes "The First Time" short story (art by Dave Taylor) from the Vertigo Secret Files & Origins: Hellblazer one-shot (2000)
  - John Constantine, Hellblazer Volume 15 (collects #162–174, tpb, 320 pages, 2017, ISBN 1-4012-6579-0)
  - John Constantine, Hellblazer Volume 22 (includes the co-feature from #250, tpb, 392 pages, 2020, ISBN 1-4012-9568-1)
- El Diablo vol. 2 #1–4 (with Danijel Žeželj, 2001) collected as El Diablo (tpb, 104 pages, 2008, ISBN 1-4012-1625-0)
- Sgt. Rock: Between Hell and a Hard Place (with Joe Kubert, graphic novel, hc, 144 pages, 2003, ISBN 1-4012-0053-2; sc, 2004, ISBN 1-4012-0054-0)
- Loveless (with Marcelo Frusin (#1–5, 9–10), Danijel Žeželj (#6–8, 13–15, 22–24) and Werther Dell'Edera, 2005–2008) collected as:
  - A Kin of Homecoming (collects #1–5, tpb, 128 pages, 2006, ISBN 1-4012-1061-9)
  - Thicker Than Blackwater (collects #6–12, tpb, 168 pages, 2007, ISBN 1-4012-1250-6)
  - Blackwater Falls (collects #13–24, tpb, 288 pages, 2008, ISBN 1-4012-1495-9)
- Vertigo Crime: Filthy Rich (with Victor Santos, graphic novel, hc, 200 pages, 2009, ISBN 1-4012-1184-4; sc, 2010, ISBN 1-4012-1185-2)
- The Bat-Man (with Cliff Chiang, unproduced series intended for publication under the First Wave imprint, then under Vertigo, c. 2010–2011)
- Spaceman (hc, 224 pages, 2012, ISBN 1-4012-3552-2; tpb, 2014, ISBN 1-4012-4270-7) collects:
  - Strange Adventures (with Eduardo Risso, untitled 8-page prelude in the anthology one-shot, 2011)
  - Spaceman #1–9 (with Eduardo Risso, 2011–2012)

==== DC Universe ====
- Batman:
  - Batman by Brian Azzarello and Eduardo Risso (hc, 240 pages, 2017, ISBN 1-4012-7101-4) collects:
    - Batman: Gotham Knights #8: "Black and White" (with Eduardo Risso, co-feature, 2000) also collected in Batman: Black and White Volume 2 (hc, 176 pages, 2002, ISBN 1-56389-828-4; tpb, 2003, ISBN 1-56389-917-5)
    - Batman #620–625: "Broken City" (with Eduardo Risso, 2003–2004) also collected as Batman: Broken City (hc, 144 pages, 2004, ISBN 1-4012-0133-4; tpb, 2005, ISBN 1-4012-0214-4)
    - Wednesday Comics #1–12: "Batman" (with Eduardo Risso, anthology, 2009) also collected in Wednesday Comics (hc, 200 pages, 2009, ISBN 1-4012-2747-3)
    - Flashpoint: Batman — Knight of Vengeance #1–3 (with Eduardo Risso, 2011) also collected in Flashpoint: The World of Flashpoint Featuring Batman (tpb, 272 pages, 2012, ISBN 1-4012-3405-4)
  - Batman: Gotham Knights #35: "Cornered" (with Jim Mahfood, co-feature, 2003) collected in Batman: Black and White Volume 3 (hc, 288 pages, 2007, ISBN 1-4012-1531-9; tpb, 2008, ISBN 1-4012-1354-5)
  - Solo #6: "Poison" (with Jordi Bernet, anthology, 2005) collected in Solo (hc, 608 pages, 2013, ISBN 1-4012-3889-0)
  - Joker (with Lee Bermejo, graphic novel, 128 pages, 2008, ISBN 1-4012-1581-5)
  - Batman vol. 2 #44: "A Simple Case" (co-written by Azzarello and Scott Snyder, art by Jock, 2015) collected in Batman: Superheavy (hc, 176 pages, 2016, ISBN 1-4012-5969-3; tpb, 2016, ISBN 1-4012-6630-4)
  - Batman: Europa #1–4 (co-written by Azzarello and Matteo Casali, art by Jim Lee (#1), Giuseppe Camuncoli (#2), Diego Latorre (#3) and Gerald Parel (#4) from layouts by Camuncoli, 2016)
    - The series was initially announced in 2004 with Gabriele Dell'Otto slated to draw issue #4; it was first solicited for a 2011 release with Jock as the fourth issue's artist.
    - Collected as Batman: Europa (hc, 144 pages, 2016, ISBN 1-4012-5970-7; tpb, 2018, ISBN 1-4012-8555-4)
  - The Dark Knight III (co-written by Azzarello and Frank Miller):
    - Batman: The Dark Knight — The Master Race (hc, 392 pages, 2017, ISBN 1-4012-6513-8; tpb, 2018, ISBN 1-4012-8431-0) collects:
      - The Dark Knight III: The Master Race #1–9 (art by Andy Kubert, 2016–2017)
      - Dark Knight Universe Presents (series of 12-page mini-comics):
        - The Atom (art by Frank Miller, originally published as an insert in issue #1, 2016)
        - Wonder Woman (art by Eduardo Risso, originally published as an insert in issue #2, 2016)
        - Green Lantern (art by John Romita, Jr., originally published as an insert in issue #3, 2016)
        - Batgirl (art by Frank Miller, originally published as an insert in issue #4, 2016)
        - Lara (art by Frank Miller, originally published as an insert in issue #5, 2016)
        - World's Finest (art by Frank Miller, originally published as an insert in issue #6, 2016)
        - Strange Adventures (art by Frank Miller, originally published as an insert in issue #7, 2017)
        - Detective Comics (art by Frank Miller, originally published as an insert in issue #8, 2017)
        - Action Comics (art by Frank Miller, originally published as an insert in issue #9, 2017)
    - The Dark Knight Returns: The Last Crusade (art by John Romita, Jr., one-shot, 2016)
  - Joker: 80th Anniversary 100-Page Super Spectacular: "Two Fell into the Hornet's Nest" (with Lee Bermejo, anthology one-shot, 2020)
    - Collected in Joker: The Deluxe Edition (hc, 152 pages, 2020, ISBN 1-4012-9428-6)
    - Collected in Batman: 80 Years of the Bat Family (tpb, 400 pages, 2020, ISBN 1-77950-658-9)
  - Batman: The World: "Global City" (with Lee Bermejo, anthology graphic novel, 184 pages, 2021, ISBN 1-77951-227-9)
- 9-11 Volume 2: "America's Pastime" (with Eduardo Risso, anthology graphic novel, 224 pages, 2002, ISBN 1-56389-878-0)
- JSA All-Stars #6: "Blind Spot" (with Eduardo Risso, co-feature, 2003) collected in JSA: All-Stars (tpb, 208 pages, 2004, ISBN 1-4012-0219-5)
- Superman:
  - Superman vol. 2 (with Jim Lee, 2004–2005) collected as:
    - For Tomorrow Volume 1 (collects #204–209, hc, 160 pages, 2005, ISBN 1-4012-0351-5; tpb, 2006, ISBN 1-4012-0352-3)
    - For Tomorrow Volume 2 (collects #210–215, hc, 160 pages, 2005, ISBN 1-4012-0715-4; tpb, 2006, ISBN 1-4012-0448-1)
    - For Tomorrow (collects #204–215, Absolute Edition, 328 pages, 2009, ISBN 1-4012-2198-X; tpb, 2013, ISBN 1-4012-3780-0)
  - Lex Luthor: Man of Steel #1–5 (with Lee Bermejo, 2005) collected as Lex Luthor: Man of Steel (tpb, 120 pages, 2006, ISBN 1-4012-0454-6)
    - Following the success of Joker, DC reprinted the series with newly created story pages as Luthor (hc, 144 pages, 2010, ISBN 1-4012-2930-1; tpb, 2015, ISBN 1-4012-5818-2)
    - The "enhanced" version of the book was re-released as part of the two-volume set Absolute Luthor/Joker (hc, 384 pages, 2013, ISBN 1-4012-4504-8)
  - Superman/Batman #75: "Joker and Lex" (with Lee Bermejo, co-feature, 2010) collected in Superman/Batman Volume 6 (tpb, 328 pages, 2017, ISBN 1-4012-7503-6)
- DC Comics Presents: Green Lantern: "Penny for Your Thoughts, Dollar for Your Destiny!" (with Norm Breyfogle, co-feature in one-shot, 2004)
- Solo #1: "Low Card in the Hole" (with Tim Sale, anthology, 2004) collected in Solo (hc, 608 pages, 2013, ISBN 1-4012-3889-0)
- Tales of the Unexpected vol. 2 #1–8: "Architecture and Mortality" (with Cliff Chiang, anthology, 2006–2007) collected as Doctor 13: Architecture and Mortality (tpb, 144 pages, 2007, ISBN 1-4012-1552-1)
- Wonder Woman vol. 4 (with Cliff Chiang, Tony Akins (#5–6, 9–10, 13–14, 17–19), Kano (#10), Amilcar Pinna (#17), Goran Sudžuka (#18–20, 24–26, 28, 30–32) and Aco (#23.2), 2011–2014) collected as:
  - Blood (collects #1–6, hc, 160 pages, 2012, ISBN 1-4012-3563-8; tpb, 2013, ISBN 1-4012-3562-X)
  - Guts (collects #7–12, hc, 144 pages, 2013, ISBN 1-4012-3809-2; tpb, 2013, ISBN 1-4012-3810-6)
  - Iron (collects #0 and #13–17, hc, 176 pages, 2013, ISBN 1-4012-4261-8; tpb, 2014, ISBN 1-4012-4607-9)
  - War (collects #19–23, hc, 144 pages, 2014, ISBN 1-4012-4608-7; tpb, 2014, ISBN 1-4012-4954-X)
  - Flesh (collects #23.2 and 24–29, hc, 176 pages, 2014, ISBN 1-4012-5097-1; tpb, 2015, ISBN 1-4012-5349-0)
  - Bones (collects #30–35, hc, 160 pages, 2015, ISBN 1-4012-5350-4; tpb, 2015, ISBN 1-4012-5775-5)
    - Includes the Wonder Woman short story (co-written by Azzarello and Cliff Chiang, art by Goran Sudžuka) from Secret Origins vol. 3 #6 (anthology, 2014)
  - Wonder Woman by Brian Azzarello and Cliff Chiang: The Absolute Edition Volume 1 (collects #0–18, hc, 484 pages, 2017, ISBN 1-4012-6848-X)
  - Wonder Woman by Brian Azzarello and Cliff Chiang: The Absolute Edition Volume 2 (collects #19–35, 23.2 and the short story from Secret Origins vol. 3 #6, hc, 456 pages, 2018, ISBN 1-4012-7749-7)
  - Wonder Woman by Brian Azzarello and Cliff Chiang Omnibus (collects #0–35, 23.2 and the short story from Secret Origins vol. 3 #6, hc, 928 pages, 2019, ISBN 1-4012-9109-0)
- Before Watchmen: Comedian / Rorschach (hc, 256 pages, 2013, ISBN 1-4012-3893-9, tpb, 2014, ISBN 1-4012-4513-7) collects:
  - Before Watchmen: Comedian #1–6 (with J. G. Jones, 2012–2013)
  - Before Watchmen: Rorschach #1–4 (with Lee Bermejo, 2012–2013)
- The New 52: Futures End (co-written by Azzarello, Jeff Lemire, Dan Jurgens and Keith Giffen, art by various artists, 2014–2015) collected as:
  - Volume 1 (collects #0–17, tpb, 416 pages, 2014, ISBN 1-4012-5244-3)
  - Volume 2 (collects #18–30, tpb, 304 pages, 2015, ISBN 1-4012-5602-3)
  - Volume 3 (collects #31–48, tpb, 408 pages, 2015, ISBN 1-4012-5878-6)
- DC 100-Page Comic Giant: Swamp Thing — Halloween Horror: "Hollow" (with Greg Capullo, co-feature in one-shot, 2018)
  - Collected in Swamp Thing: Roots of Terror (hc, 168 pages, 2019, ISBN 1-4012-9587-8)
  - Collected in Swamp Thing: Tales from the Bayou (tpb, 168 pages, 2020, ISBN 1-77950-115-3)

==== Other imprints ====
- Wildstorm:
  - Wildstorm Summer Special: "Apple Read" (with Brian Stelfreeze, anthology one-shot, 2001)
  - The Authority vol. 2 (with Steve Dillon, cancelled relaunch of the series intended for publication under the Eye of the Storm imprint — initially announced for April 2002)
  - Batman/Deathblow #1–3 (with Lee Bermejo, 2003) collected as Batman/Deathblow: After the Fire (tpb, 160 pages, 2003, ISBN 1-4012-0034-6; hc, 2013, ISBN 1-4012-3772-X)
  - Deathblow vol. 2 #1–9 (with Carlos D'Anda, 2006–2008) collected as Deathblow: And Then You Live! (tpb, 224 pages, 2008, ISBN 1-4012-1515-7)
- First Wave:
  - First Wave (hc, 256 pages, 2011, ISBN 1-4012-3135-7; tpb, 2012, ISBN 1-4012-3136-5) collects:
    - Batman/Doc Savage Special (with Phil Noto, 2009)
    - First Wave #1–6 (with Rags Morales, 2010–2011)
  - The Spirit vol. 7 #6: "The Man I Love" (with Eduardo Risso, co-feature, 2010)
  - Doc Savage vol. 5 #6–12 (co-written by Azzarello and Ivan Brandon, art by Nic Klein, James Harren (#8–9) and Phil Winslade (#10), 2010–2011)
- DC Black Label:
  - Batman: Damned #1–3 (with Lee Bermejo, 2018–2019) collected as Batman: Damned (hc, 176 pages, 2019, ISBN 1-4012-9140-6; tpb, 2021, ISBN 1-77950-947-2)
  - Birds of Prey (with Emanuela Lupacchino, one-shot, 2020)
    - The project was initially announced as an ongoing series set in the main DC continuity with an October 2019 launch date.
    - Two issues were solicited before the series was postponed until the release of the Birds of Prey film and relegated to the Black Label imprint.
  - Suicide Squad: Get Joker! #1–3 (with Alex Maleev, 2021–2022) collected as Suicide Squad: Get Joker! (hc, 160 pages, 2022, ISBN 1-77951-425-5)

=== Other publishers ===
- Marvel:
  - Startling Stories: Banner #1–4 (with Richard Corben, 2001)
    - Collected as Startling Stories: Banner (tpb, 112 pages, 2001, ISBN 0-7851-0853-X)
    - Collected in The Incredible Hulk Volume 1 (hc, 352 pages, 2002, ISBN 0-7851-1022-4)
  - Cage #1–5 (with Richard Corben, Marvel MAX, 2002) collected as Cage (hc, 128 pages, 2002, ISBN 0-7851-0966-8; tpb, 2003, ISBN 0-7851-1301-0)
  - Spider-Man's Tangled Web #14: "The Last Shoot" (co-written by Azzarello and Scott Levy, art by Giuseppe Camuncoli, anthology, 2002)
    - Collected in Spider-Man's Tangled Web Volume 3 (tpb, 160 pages, 2002, ISBN 0-7851-0951-X)
    - Collected in Spider-Man's Tangled Web Omnibus (hc, 560 pages, 2017, ISBN 1-302-90682-8)
- Noir: A Collection of Crime Comics: "The Bad Night" (with Gabriel Bá and Fábio Moon, anthology graphic novel, sc, 104 pages, Dark Horse, 2009, ISBN 1-59582-358-1; hc, 2020, ISBN 1-5067-1686-5)
- Aftershock:
  - American Monster #1–6 (with Juan Doe, 2016–2017)
    - Issues #1–5 are collected as American Monster: Sweetland (tpb, 120 pages, 2016, ISBN 1-935002-93-7)
  - Shock Volume 1: "Based on a True Story" (with Toni Fejzula, anthology graphic novel, 160 pages, 2018, ISBN 1-935002-65-1)
- Image:
  - 3 Floyds: Alpha King #1–5 (co-written by Azzarello and Nick Floyd, art by Simon Bisley, 2016–2017) collected as 3 Floyds: Alpha King (tpb, 128 pages, 2018, ISBN 1-63215-867-1)
    - Initially announced as a 4-issue limited series titled 3 Floyds: Rise of the Alpha King, to be written by Azzarello solo and intended for publication by Heavy Metal Media.
  - Moonshine (with Eduardo Risso, 2016–2021) collected as:
    - Damn Near Perfect (collects #1–6, tpb, 144 pages, 2017, ISBN 1-5343-0064-3)
    - Misery Train (collects #7–12, tpb, 144 pages, 2018, ISBN 1-5343-0827-X)
    - Rue Le Jour (collects #13–17, tpb, 120 pages, 2020, ISBN 1-5343-1514-4)
    - The Angels Share (collects #18–22, tpb, 120 pages, 2020, ISBN 1-5343-1724-4)
    - The Well (collects #23–28, tpb, 144 pages, 2021, ISBN 1-5343-1986-7)
- Mine! (A Celebration of Liberty and Freedom for All Benefiting Planned Parenthood): "Fright of the Morning Dread" (with Cliff Chiang, anthology graphic novel, hc, 304 pages, ComicMix, 2018, ISBN 1-939888-66-2; sc, 2018, ISBN 1-939888-65-4)
- Faithless (with María Llovet, Boom! Studios):
  - Faithless #1–6 (2019) collected as Faithless (tpb, 128 pages, 2020, ISBN 1-68415-432-4)
  - Faithless II #1–6 (2020) collected as Faithless II (tpb, 160 pages, 2021, ISBN 1-68415-658-0)
  - Faithless III #1–6 (2022) collected as Faithless III (tpb, 160 pages, 2023, ISBN 1-68415-850-8)
- Anthrax: Among the Living: "A.D.I. / Horror of It All" (with Dave Johnson, anthology graphic novel, 120 pages, Z2 Comics, 2021, ISBN 1-940878-59-4)
- The Most Important Comic Book on Earth (anthology graphic novel, 352 pages, DK, 2021, ISBN 0-7440-4282-8) featured two stories written by Azzarello:
  - "The Shepherd and the Thunder" (script by Azzarello based on the concept by Peter Hammarstedt, art by Danijel Žeželj)
  - "Ohno" (with Cliff Chiang)

== Filmography ==
- Batman: Gotham Knight (2008), segment "Working Through Pain"
- Batman: The Killing Joke (2016), based on the eponymous graphic novel

| Preceded by Warren Ellis | Hellblazer writer 2000–2002 | Succeeded by Mike Carey |
| Preceded by Jeph Loeb | Batman writer 2003–2004 | Succeeded by Judd Winick |
| Preceded by Steven T. Seagle | Superman writer 2004–2005 | Succeeded by Mark Verheiden |
| Preceded by Paul Malmont | Doc Savage writer 2010–2011 (with Ivan Brandon) | Succeeded by J. G. Jones |
| Preceded by Phil Hester | Wonder Woman writer 2011–2014 | Succeeded by Meredith Finch |
| Preceded by Julie and Shawna Benson (Batgirl and the Birds of Prey) | Birds of Prey writer 2020 | Succeeded by Jimmy Palmiotti; Amanda Conner (Harley Quinn and the Birds of Prey) |
