= Batman: Noël =

2011 graphic novel by Lee Bermejo

- Date: November 2, 2011
- Main characters: Batman; Superman; Bob Crachit; Tim; Joker; Alfred Pennyworth; Catwoman; Jim Gordon; Robin
- Page count: 112 pages
- Publisher: DC Comics

Creative team
- Writers: Lee Bermejo
- Artists: Lee Bermejo
- Inkers: Lee Bermejo
- Letterers: Todd Klein
- Colourists: Barbara Ciardo

Original publication
- Language: English
- ISBN: 1401232132

Batman: Noël is a 2011 original graphic novel written and illustrated by Lee Bermejo and published by DC, featuring the superhero Batman. It is an analogous adaptation of Charles Dickens' 1843 novella A Christmas Carol. In Batman: Noël, Bruce Wayne uses a poverty-stricken parent as bait for his nemesis, the Joker, on Christmas Eve.

== Structure ==
The standalone story features a framing device in the form of a second-hand retelling of A Christmas Carol, which informs the story through metaphors and synchronicity; Scrooge is represented by Batman (and the Joker, to a lesser degree), who is depicted as lonely, cynical and joyless, before gaining a festive optimism. The various ghosts of A Christmas Carol are alluded to by familiar DC Universe characters; Jason Todd/Robin, having died under Batman's employ, fills the role of Scrooge's late friend Jacob Marley via a pneumonia-induced hallucination. Selina Kyle/Catwoman, Clark Kent/Superman and the Joker represent the Ghosts of Christmas Past, Present and Future, respectively. Jim Gordon bears similarities to Scrooge's unnamed nephew and Bob Cratchitt appears in the story as a debtor to the Joker. Tiny Tim is likewise featured. While not explicitly connected, Batman: Noel features similar character designs from Joker, another graphic novel illustrated by Bermejo.

== Plot ==
On Christmas Eve in Gotham City, a financially struggling man named Bob launders cash for the Joker. Batman (Bruce Wayne) intercepts him and demands to know where the Joker is. Batman secretly attaches a tracer to Bob as he runs home to his cheery but sickly son, Tim, who lives with him in a shabby apartment. Batman intends to use the two as bait to capture the Joker.

Back at the Batcave, Batman begins to become sick with a virus, but continues his work at the objection of Alfred Pennyworth. He briefly hallucinates about his deceased sidekick Robin, which makes him disturbed and nostalgic for the colourful adventures they once had. Batman responds to the Bat-Signal, where Commissioner Gordon tells Batman that Catwoman has tipped off the GCPD that she has information about the Joker, but demands that she only talk to Batman. Confronting Catwoman, Batman discovers, as he suspected, that she was lying and only called him so she could "play with [him]", prompting nostalgia of their conflicts together. Batman rudely dismisses her, and falls from the rooftop attempting to catch her.

Batman is met by his exhuberant friend Superman, who uses X-ray vision to determine Batman is coming down with pneumonia, though Batman shrugs it off. Superman then takes Batman into the skies to watch ordinary Gothamites preparing for Christmas; Batman remains cynical. They then stop to watch Bob and Tim, then Commissioner Gordon talking with an officer about their differing opinions of Batman. Advising Batman to take time off and recover his health, Superman drops Batman off at the Batmobile, then flies away.

Batman attempts to enter the Batmobile, which explodes upon activation and knocks him out. The Joker drags the unconscious Batman to a graveyard to be thrown alive into an open grave. While buried, Batman has a vision where Gotham is plunged into chaos after his death, with Gordon tried and convicted for cooperating with Batman's extra-legal activities, and vigilantes killing criminals in Batman's name. With a new determination, Batman wakes and digs himself free from the grave. At Bob's apartment, Bob and the Joker have a scuffle which ends with Bob holding Joker at gunpoint. The Joker goads Bob to pull the trigger, but Batman convinces him to lower the gun for his son's sake.

The Joker is returned to Arkham Asylum and Bruce Wayne gives Bob a job, as well as a generous donation. With a newfound sense of optimism, Bruce finally heeds advice and rests. Bob tells the story of A Christmas Carol to Tim and wonders if there is any truth to the tale.

== Reception ==
Rob Patey of Ain't It Cool News called Batman: Noël "an instant classic", complimenting Bermejo's "kinetic artwork" and his ability to keep the story grounded while deftly transcending reality.

== Video games ==
- In Batman: Arkham Origins, which is similarly set at Christmas, the Batman: Noël batsuit is an alternate outfit which can be used in challenge mode, online multiplayer, and in Story mode after beating the main story on Normal or Hard. The skin can also be purchased as part of the "New Millennium Skin Pack".
- The 2015 video game Batman: Arkham Knight also offers the Noël batsuit as free DLC which was released for Christmas time.

== See also ==
- Adaptations of A Christmas Carol
