= Dark Entries (comics) =

2009 graphic novel by Ian Rankin

- Cover to Dark Entries by Lee Bermejo.
- Date: 2009
- Main characters: John Constantine
- Series: Hellblazer
- Page count: 216 pages
- Publisher: Vertigo Crime (DC Comics)

Creative team
- Writers: Ian Rankin
- Artists: Werther Dell'Edera
- Letterers: Clem Robins
- Editors: Karen Berger; Will Dennis; Mark Doyle
- ISBN: 1-4012-1386-3

Dark Entries is a 2009 original graphic novel written by Ian Rankin. The author's earliest work in the comic field, it was one of two books to launch Vertigo's new sub-imprint Vertigo Crime, along with Brian Azzarello's Filthy Rich. Italian artist Werther Dell'Edera created the interior art and Lee Bermejo painted the cover for the book.

The story involves DC Comics character John Constantine, best known from the Vertigo series Hellblazer. Dark Entries is the only publication in the Vertigo Crime imprint to feature an established DC Universe character.

== Plot ==
The plot of the novel involves John Constantine being convinced to enter a reality television program which has suffered several strange hauntings, a thinly veiled satire of British programmes Most Haunted and Big Brother.

This turns out to be not a television programme made for humanity, but for the denizens of Hell, and John must work out a way to escape from this.

== Publication history ==
Rankin has explained how the project came about:

I got an email out of the blue from Titan asking me whether I had ever thought about writing something like this. My first love when I was a kid was comics. I had been waiting 40 years for this opportunity. I just pitched ideas at them; eventually we both agreed on one that would work.

== Release details ==
- Dark Entries (by Ian Rankin and Werther Dell'Edera, 216 pages, hardcover, Vertigo, August 2009, ISBN 1-4012-1386-3, Titan Books, October 2009, ISBN 1-84856-342-6)

== Reception ==
Paul Gravett has said that "Ian's story was a bit hackneyed; it reminded me of the 1959 horror film House on Haunted Hill; this old thing of whether you will survive the night". Craig Taylor reviewed the book for The Guardian and says the graphic novel "does offer a few clever ideas and some rough, energetic black and white artwork", but felt the plot was slack and the setting as dated and unworthy. Also at The Guardian Ned Beauman suggested that Dark Entries "does at least overcome most of the limitations of its own suicidally unpromising premise" and "despite some lapses in characterisation ... Rankin does seem to have a basic feel for his adopted hero. But beyond that, there's very little to praise, particularly not the clumsy dialogue".
