= Filthy Rich (comics) =

- Cover by Lee Bermejo
- Date: 2009
- Page count: 200 pages
- Publisher: Vertigo Crime (DC Comics)

Creative team
- Writers: Brian Azzarello
- Artists: Víctor Santos
- Letterers: Clem Robins
- Editors: Will Dennis
- ISBN: 1-4012-1184-4

Filthy Rich is a 2009 original graphic novel written by Brian Azzarello. It was one of two books to launch Vertigo's Vertigo Crime line along with Ian Rankin's Dark Entries. The interior art was created by Victor Santos and cover was done by Lee Bermejo.

== Plot ==
The story centres on Richard "Junk" Junkin, a former professional football star whose career was prematurely ended by injury and who now is employed as a car salesman. When Junk's boss at the car showroom asks him to become his daughter's personal bodyguard during her nights out on the New York club scene he cannot believe his luck. Junk has been lusting after his boss's daughter for a long-time and sees this as an excellent opportunity get close to her. Junk soon realises that his boss's daughter Victoria wants a lot more than just a bodyguard and she will use all her power over Junk and her money to make sure he does exactly what she wants, including murder.

== Release details ==
- Filthy Rich (by Brian Azzarello and Victor Santos, 200 pages, Vertigo, August 2009, ISBN 1-4012-1184-4)
