= Jonny Double (Vertigo) =

Comic series

- Cover of Jonny Double #1 (September 1998), art by Mark Chiarello.

Publication information
- Publisher: Vertigo
- Schedule: Monthly
- Format: Miniseries
- Genre: Crime
- Publication date: September - December 1998
- No. of issues: 4

Creative team
- Written by: Brian Azzarello
- Penciller(s): Eduardo Risso
- Inker(s): Eduardo Risso
- Letterer(s): Clem Robins
- Colorist(s): Grant Goleash
- Editor(s): Axel Alonso

Collected editions
- Jonny Double: ISBN 1-56389-815-2

Jonny Double is a comic series written by Brian Azzarello and published by the Vertigo imprint of DC Comics. The series was based on the Jonny Double character, created in 1968 by Len Wein and Marv Wolfman. It was the first collaboration of Azzarello and artist Eduardo Risso, which subsequently led to a successful and longstanding pairing on 100 Bullets.

== Publication history ==
Jonny Double was published in four issues, from September to December 1998.

== Plot ==
Jonny Double, an aging private investigator in San Francisco with a peculiar fascination with the 1960s counterculture, is contracted by a concerned father to investigate his daughter, a girl named Faith, and report on the character of her associates. Through a series of twists and turns, Faith introduces Jonny to a seemingly fool-proof scheme to make money without hurting anyone: emptying a long-forgotten bank account once held by Al Capone. Unbeknownst to Double, the money in the account belongs to a local gangster named Vic Dalenozzo, who starts to murder and maim Faith and Jonny's associates. Jonny eventually discovers that Faith has been manipulating both sides all along.

Jonny decides to cut to the chase, and he brings all the money straight to Dalenozzo, where Jonny discovers that the man who originally hired him to investigate Faith was not her father at all, but Dalenozzo's main hitman. As Dalenozzo is about to have Jonny tortured to death, Jonny tells them all he knows about Faith, and Dalenozzo sends his killers after her. Dalenozzo then reveals to Jonny that he and Jonny were acquaintances during the 1960s, when Jonny knew him as "The Wave". He tells Jonny that he wants to repay him for a favor Jonny did him in the old days, but there is a catch.

== Collected editions ==
The limited series was collected into a trade paperback in 2002 (ISBN 1-56389-815-2). It is now out of print. The series was later collected under the Vertigo Resurrected line in October 2011 (OCLC 703225439).
