= Werther Dell'Edera =

Italian comic book artist

- Born: 1975 (age 50–51); Bari, Italy
- Occupation: comic book artist
- Years active: 2003-present
- Notable work: Something Is Killing the Children

Werther Dell'Edera is an Italian comic book artist who is best known for Something Is Killing the Children, which he provided art for and co-created, and its spin-offs House of Slaughter and Book of Butcher.

== Biography ==
Werther Dell'Edera was born in Bari, Italy in 1975. He currently lives in Rome, Italy. After finishing high school in Bari, he decided that university did not interest him and chose to move to Rome to attend the Roman School of Comics. His first job in the comics industry was in 2003 working as a draftsman on Road's End, published by Magic Press. Followed by working for Eura Editorial on projects Detective Dante and John Doe. He then started working with American publishers his first being Vertigo working on Loveless, then Dark Entries. He has also worked with Marvel Comics on many occasions, his main comic being The Amazing Spider-Man: Family Business. They have collaborated with Sergio Bonelli Editore creating comics; Orfani, Dylan Dog, and Le Storie. He worked with Tiziano Sclavi creating The Voices of Water in 2019. In 2019 he co-created Something Is Killing the Children with James Tynion IV published by BOOM! Studios.

== Bibliography ==
Work	Year	Role
Road's End	2003	Draftsman
Detective Dante	2005-2007	Drawings
John Doe	2006-2008	Drawings
Loveless	2005-2008	Illustrator
Punisher War Journal Annual	2008	Penciller
X-Force Special: Ain't No Dog	2008	Penciller
Dark Entries	2009	Illustrator
Orfani	2013-2018	Illustrator
G.I. Joe: The Cobra Files	2013-2014	Illustrator
Amazing Spider-Man: Family Business	2014	Illustrator
Le Storie #49	2016	Drawings
Nancy Drew & The Hardy Boys: The Big Lie	2017	Illustrator
Briggs Land (Vol 2)	2018	Illustrator
The Crow: Momento Mori	2018	Illustrator
Something Is Killing the Children	2019-Present	Co-Creator; Illustrator
Aliens: Colonial Marines - Rising Threat (cancelled)	2019-2020 (planned)	Illustrator
Batman/Dylan Dog	2019, 2023	Illustrator
Razorblades	2020	Illustrator (Guest?)
He Who Fights With Monsters	2021	Illustrator
House of Slaughter	2022-2025	Co-Creator; Illustrator
The Voices of Water	2022	Illustrator
Book of Slaughter	2022	Illustrator
Bloodborne: The Bleak Dominion	2023	Cover Artist (#1 Issue)
Knight Terrors: The Flash	2023	Cover Artist
Book of Butcher	2023	Illustrator
The Flash #6	2024	1:25 Variant Cover
Green Lantern Dark	2024-2025	Illustrator
Book of Cutter	2025	Illustrator

== Awards ==
Year	Organization	Work	Award	Result
2018	Treviso Comic Book Festival	The Crow: Memento Mori	Best Italian Cover Artist	Won
2019	Etna Comics	Not Applicable	Best Italian Designer	Won
2020	Eisner Awards	Something Is Killing the Children	Best New Series	Nominated
2020	Harvey Awards	Something Is Killing the Children	Book of the Year	Nominated
2021	Lucca Comics & Games	Something Is Killing the Children	Best Design	Won
2022	Eisner Awards	Something Is Killing the Children	Best Continuing Series	Won
2022	Ringo Awards	Something Is Killing the Children	Best Series	Won
2022	Ringo Awards	Something Is Killing the Children	Best Single Issue (#20)	Won
