= Lex Luthor: Man of Steel =

American comic book series

- Cover of Lex Luthor: Man of Steel #1 (March 2005), art by Lee Bermejo.

Publication information
- Publisher: DC Comics
- Schedule: Monthly
- Format: Limited series
- Publication date: March–September 2005
- No. of issues: 5
- Main character(s): Lex Luthor; Superman; Batman

Creative team
- Written by: Brian Azzarello
- Artist(s): Lee Bermejo
- Colorist(s): Dave Stewart

Collected editions
- Softcover: ISBN 1-4012-0454-6

Lex Luthor: Man of Steel (later collected as simply Luthor) is a five-issue monthly American comic book limited series written by Brian Azzarello and illustrated by Lee Bermejo, which features Superman's nemesis Lex Luthor as the protagonist.

The story explores Luthor's motivations behind being a constant foe to the Man of Steel inside a city that has largely embraced him. Luthor views Superman as a demigod who looks down on humanity and believes that in order to "save" the human race from extraterrestrial threats, Superman must be stopped.

== Plot ==
The story is narrated from Lex Luthor's point of view, depicting him much differently than the ruthless, corrupt killer that readers are accustomed to. Luthor charitably invites a loyal employee to the grand opening of his Science Spire, a new Metropolis attraction under construction. Luthor watches footage of Superman engaging criminals with heat vision and wonders to himself why the public invests so much trust in an alien simply because he looks human. In Chechnya, Elias Orr, one of Lex's operatives, leads a group of mercenaries in a raid to free a Russian scientist named Sasha Federov, whom Luthor enlists in a new project.

During a business meeting, Luthor learns the Science Spire has gone over budget. He stuns LexCorp executives by tossing out his previous business plan and undercutting union demands by making the project non-profit. In a LexCorp lab, he meets with Federov and speaks with a woman named Hope, who is inside a vat. Federov tells Luthor that the project is coming along well but Hope requires something they can not provide. Sometime later, Orr beats and threatens the union leader into complying with his demands while Lex flies to Gotham City to arrange a deal with Bruce Wayne. Luthor requests access to an Alzheimer's breakthrough from Wayne Enterprises. After Luthor urges Wayne to consider the potential threat that Superman poses due to his vast power, Luthor presents Wayne with kryptonite. As Batman examines the kryptonite that night, Superman attacks him and crushes the sample. Wayne calls Lex and gives him the research.

At the opening for the Science Spire, Lex introduces a new, corporate-sponsored superhero, Hope, who is the culmination of the research of Wayne and Federov. Over time, Hope becomes immensely popular. Luthor tells her how proud he is of her and that she is more than that he had ever dreamed she would be, much to the chagrin of his secretary Mona. Orr recruits Winslow Schott (Toyman) with an offer on behalf of Luthor. Hope and Luthor are in bed together when a news bulletin breaks that Schott is wanted for a bombing at the Metropolis Daycare Center (in which over seventy adults and children, including, coincidentally, Federov and his family are killed). Orr and Schott panic when they realize they have been manipulated and set up. Lex urges Hope to bring Schott to justice.

As Superman battles Schott's robot soldiers, Hope grabs Schott and soars into the sky. At LexCorp, Luthor activates a control that forces Hope to drop Schott – an action that confuses Hope but is popular with the public. At the last minute, Superman saves Schott. Superman confronts her, and they fight at the Science Spire. When Superman uses his heat vision on her, she is revealed to be an android. Despite having professed his love for her, Luthor causes Hope to self-destruct, destroying both the Science Spire and the evidence that she was an android. Superman, who now looks like he has murdered Hope, silently confronts Luthor at LexCorp. Luthor defiantly says he has sacrificed everything, but it was worth it to have the possibility of turning the public against Superman. As Superman leaves, Luthor considers the morality of his actions.

== Reception ==
IGN called it a "brilliant series" and praised its ability to reshape fans' impressions of Luthor. Digital Spy recommended the story be used as an origin story in the DC Extended Universe (DCEU). The miniseries garnered attention to the team of Azzarello and Bermejo, who had previously worked together on Batman/Deathblow: After the Fire. The team reunited in 2008 for the hardcover graphic novel simply entitled Joker, sparking fan speculation about a possible "villain spotlight" trend due to their works with Superman and Batman's greatest foes.

== Collected editions ==
=== Paperback ===
Title	Material collected	Publication date	ISBN
Lex Luthor: Man of Steel	Lex Luthor: Man of Steel #1-5	December 28, 2005	978-1-4012-0454-9
Luthor	Lex Luthor: Man of Steel #1-5	November 4, 2015	978-1-4012-5818-4
Luthor 10th Anniversary Edition (DC Black Label Edition)	Lex Luthor: Man of Steel #1-5	July 9, 2019	1-4012-9199-6/978-1-4012-9199-0

=== Hardcover ===
Title	Material collected	Publication date	ISBN
Luthor	Lex Luthor: Man of Steel #1-5	October 20, 2010	978-1-4012-4504-7
Luthor (Polish)	Lex Luthor: Man of Steel #1-5	?	832811095-4/978-832811095-3
Absolute Luthor/Joker	Lex Luthor: Man of Steel #1-5, Joker graphic novel, along with sketchbook section	October 23, 2013	978-1-4012-4504-7
