= Wednesday Comics =

Comic book by DC Comics

- Cover for Wednesday Comics #1.

Publication information
- Publisher: DC Comics
- Schedule: Weekly
- Format: Limited series
- Genre: Superhero
- Publication date: July 2009
- No. of issues: 12
- Editor: Mark Chiarello

Collected editions
- Hardcover: ISBN 1-4012-2747-3

Wednesday Comics was a weekly anthology comic book launched by DC Comics on July 8, 2009. The twelve issues of the title were published in 14" x 20" broadsheet format, deliberately similar to Sunday newspaper comics sections. Each edition featured 15 pages, each from a different story by a different creative team.

== Publication history ==
Spearheaded by DCU Editorial Art Director Mark Chiarello, creators were approached and asked to develop stories for the characters they would most like to write. Each issue was 16 pages, with each story taking up one full page when folded out.

The first Superman story was printed in USA Today and subsequent installments were posted online at the USA Today website.

== Stories ==
Each issue printed the strips in the following sequence:

- Batman – story by Brian Azzarello with art by Eduardo Risso. Batman becomes entangled in a battle over who should inherit a murdered man's estate.
- Kamandi – story by Dave Gibbons with art by Ryan Sook. Kamandi rides to the City of the Apes in an attempt to aid the Tiger Army.
- Superman – story by John Arcudi with art by Lee Bermejo. An alien attack provokes feelings of unease within the Man of Steel.
- Deadman – story by Dave Bullock/Vinton Heuck with art by Dave Bullock. While attempting to stop a serial killer, Deadman is pulled into a mystical demonic dimension where he is still alive.
- Green Lantern – story by Kurt Busiek with art by Joe Quiñones. Hal must help an astronaut and former friend who has been transformed into an alien monster.
- Metamorpho – story by Neil Gaiman with art by Mike Allred. Metamorpho accompanies Simon Stagg to an expedition for a rare diamond in a lost temple in Antarctica.
- Teen Titans – story by Eddie Berganza with art by Sean Galloway. The Titans face a dangerous enemy, Trident, hell-bent on destroying the team.
- Strange Adventures – story and art by Paul Pope and José Villarrubia. The warlord Lord Korgo besieges the city of Ranagar intent on acquiring the secret of Adam Strange's zeta beams.
- Supergirl – story by Jimmy Palmiotti with art by Amanda Conner. The Girl of Steel has trouble looking after the irrationally behaving Superpets Streaky and Krypto.
- Metal Men – story by Dan DiDio with art by José Luis García-López and Kevin Nowlan. The Metal Men foil a bank robbery only to discover a more sinister motivation behind it.
- Wonder Woman – story and art by Ben Caldwell.
- Sgt. Rock – story by Adam Kubert with art by Joe Kubert Rock is captured by Nazis and tortured into giving up the whereabouts of the Easy Company.
- The Flash – story by Karl Kerschl and Brenden Fletcher with art by Karl Kerschl. Using his superspeed while attempting to foil Gorilla Grodd's plans, the Flash finds himself dealing with a multitude of problems - Iris West's estrangement from him not being the least of them.
- The Demon and Catwoman – story by Walt Simonson with art by Brian Stelfreeze. Catwoman is hired to steal an artifact from Jason Blood, not knowing that it is all a ploy of Morgaine le Fey to regain her youth.
- Hawkman – story and art by Kyle Baker. Katar Hol fights off airplane hijackers who are really aliens and ends up landing on Dinosaur Island.

== Awards ==
Wednesday Comics won the 2010 Harvey Award in the category Best Anthology.

== Collected editions ==
The series has been collected into an individual volume:

- Wednesday Comics (200 pages, DC Comics, June 2010, ISBN 1-4012-2747-3; Titan Books, July 2010, ISBN 1-84856-755-3)

The collected edition contains two stories not printed in the monthly released newsprint:

- Plastic Man – story by Evan Dorkin with art by Stephen DeStefano. Plastic Man and Woozy battle Professor Grushenko at the museum over a magic elixir with resultant hijinks.
- Beware the Creeper – story by Keith Giffen with art by Eric Canete. A man in squalor disposes of a dead body, but is met with a surprise.
