= Lee Bermejo =

American comic book writer and artist

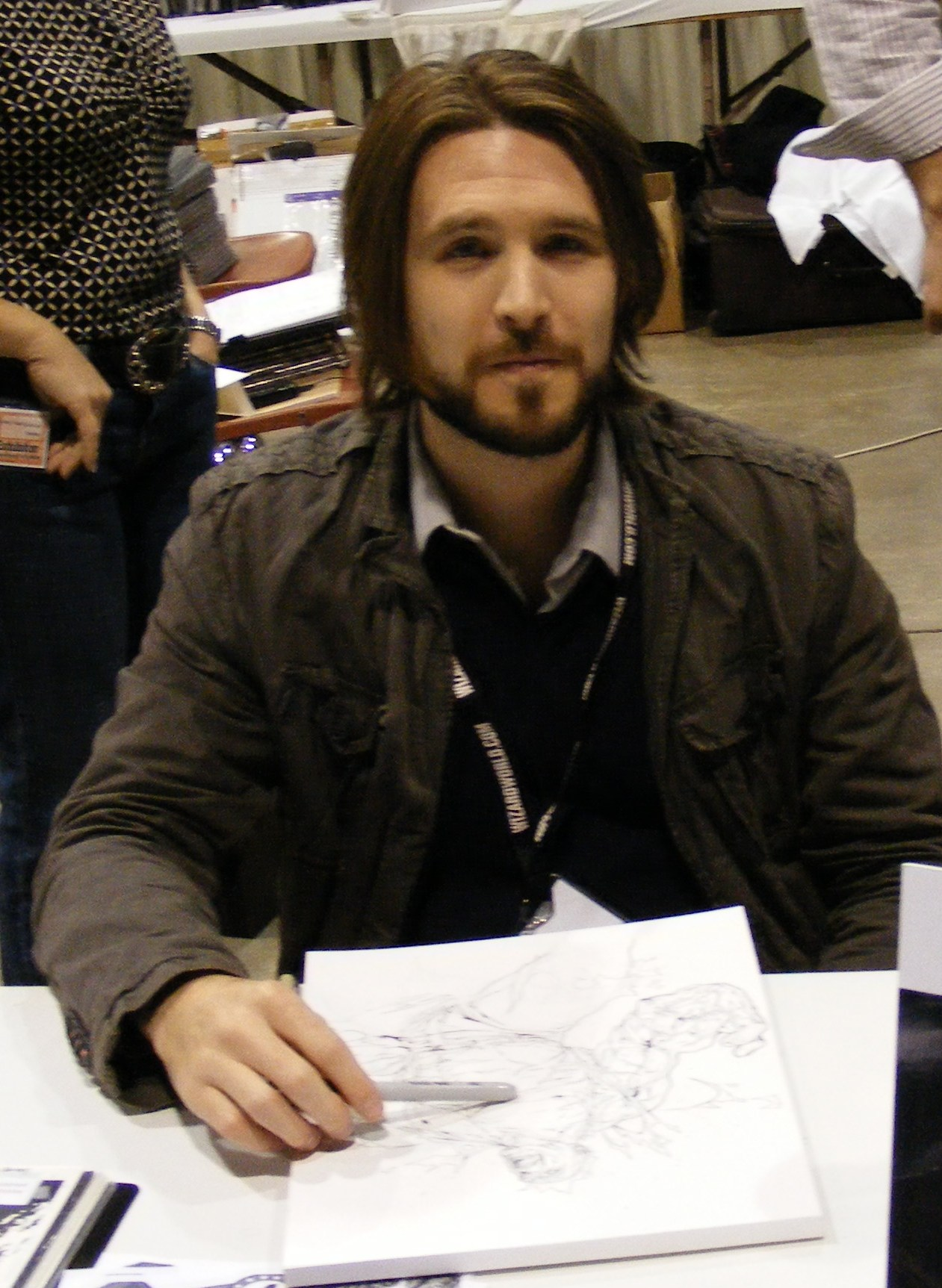
- Areas: Writer, artist
- Notable works: Batman: Noël; Before Watchmen: Rorschach; Joker; Lex Luthor: Man of Steel; Wednesday Comics
- Awards: IGN Comics Award Best Graphic Novel (2008); 2015 Eisner Awards Best Short Story (nominated)

Lee Bermejo is an American comic book writer and artist whose published work includes interior illustrations and cover art. He is best known for his collaborations with writer Brian Azzarello including Lex Luthor: Man of Steel, the Joker graphic novel, and Before Watchmen: Rorschach.

== Career ==
Lee Bermejo's career began in 1997 as an intern at WildStorm. He is self-taught, with little formal art training. His first credited comics work appeared in Gen^{13} #43 (Sept. 1999) Together with writer Joe Kelly and co-artist Doug Mahnke, Bermejo crafted the "What's So Funny About Truth, Justice & the American Way?" story in Action Comics #775 (March 2001). He and writer Brian Azzarello collaborated on the Lex Luthor: Man of Steel limited series in 2005 and the Joker graphic novel in 2008. In 2009, Bermejo drew the Superman story in the Wednesday Comics limited series. Bermejo both wrote and drew the Batman: Noël graphic novel in 2011. He and Azzarello worked together again on the Before Watchmen: Rorschach limited series in 2012–2013.

In 2015, Bermejo launched the Suiciders series for Vertigo and We Are Robin for the main DC Comics line. Bermejo drew the 2000s variant cover for Action Comics #1000 (June 2018).

== Bibliography ==
=== Interior art ===
==== BOOM! Studios ====
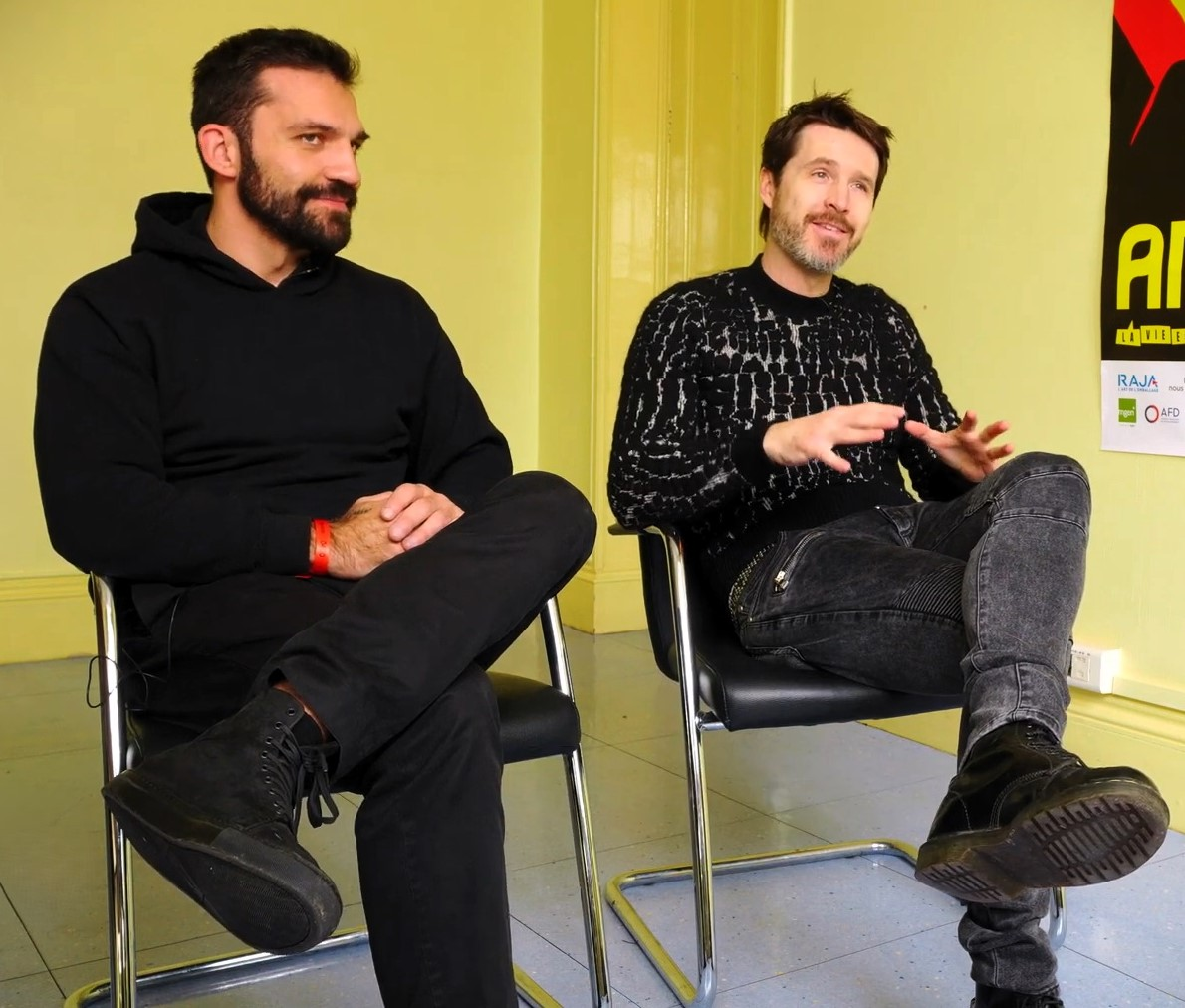
Bermejo (r) with Mattson Tomlin in 2024

- A Vicious Circle #1-3 (with Mattson Tomlin), (2022–present)

==== DC Comics ====
- Action Comics #775 (with Doug Mahnke), #800, 836 (among other artists) (2001–2006)
- Batman Black and White vol. 2 #3 ("Rule Number One'") (2014)
- Batman: Damned #1–3 (2018–2019)
- Batman / Deathblow: After the Fire #1–3 (2002)
- Batman: Dear Detective graphic novel (2022)
- Batman: Noël graphic novel (2011)
- Before Watchmen: Rorschach miniseries, #1–4 (2012–2013)
- Joker graphic novel (2008)
- Lex Luthor: Man of Steel miniseries #1–5 (2005)
- Mad Max: Fury Road: Inspired Artists (among other artists) (2015)
- Superman vol. 2 #202 (Lex Luthor preview) (2004)
- Superman/Batman #75 (two pages) (2010)
- Superman/Gen 13 #1–3 (2000)
- Wednesday Comics #1–12 (Superman (one-page each issue)(2009)

===== Vertigo =====
- 100 Bullets #26 (among other artists) (2001)
- Hellblazer #182–183 (2003)
- Suiciders #1–6 (2015)
- Suiciders: Kings of Hell.A. #1–6 (2016)

===== WildStorm =====
- Gen^{13} #43–44; #66 (among other artists) (1999–2001)
- Gen^{13}: Carny Folk #1 (2000)
- Global Frequency #9 (2003)
- Resident Evil: Fire & Ice miniseries #1–4 (2000–2001)
- Robotech #0 (among other artists) (2003)
- Wildcats Annual #1 (2000)

==== Image Comics ====
- Resident Evil #1–3 (1998)

==== Marvel Comics ====
- All-New X-Men #25 (among other artists) (2014)
- Daredevil vol. 2 #100 (among other artists) (2007)
- Marvel #6 (among other artists) (2020)

=== Cover work ===
- Action Comics #1000 variant
- Adventures of Superman #575, 617–618
- Area 10 graphic novel (2010)
- Batman: Dear Detective one-shot (2022)
- Batman: Gotham Knights #50–55
- The Bronx Kill graphic novel (2010)
- Checkmate #1–5
- The Chill graphic novel (2010)
- Daredevil #88–93, 100
- Dark Entries graphic novel (2009)
- Dark Reign Elektra #1–5
- Fear Itself Captain America #7.2 variant
- Fight Club 2 #1 variant
- Filthy Rich graphic novel (2009)
- Hellblazer #218, 221–238, 243–255
- Rumble #6 variant
- The Stand: Captain Trips #1–5
- The Stand: American Nightmares #1–5
- Stranger Things #1 (variant cover)
- X-Men: Legacy #220–224

== Awards ==
- IGN Comics Award - Best Graphic Novel 2008 Joker (DC Comics)
- 2015 Eisner Awards - Best Short Story for "Rule Number One" (nominated)
- 2023 Eisner Awards - Best Painter/Multimedia Artist (Interior Art) for A Vicious Circle (nominated)
- 2023 Eisner Awards - Best Single Issue/One-Shot for A Vicious Circle Book 1 (nominated) (shared with Mattson Tomlin)
