= Batman: Broken City =

DC Comics storyline

- Cover of Broken City #1 (Batman #620).
- Publisher: DC Comics
- Publication date: December 2003 – May 2004
- Genre: MysterySuperhero
- Title(s): Batman #620–625
- Main character(s): Batman; Killer Croc; Ventriloquist

Creative team
- Writer(s): Brian Azzarello
- Artist(s): Eduardo Risso
- Letterer(s): Clem Robins
- Colorist(s): Patricia Mulvihill
- Editor(s): Will Dennis; Bob Schreck
- Hardcover: ISBN 1-4012-0133-4
- Softcover: ISBN 1401202144

"Batman: Broken City" is a DC Comics storyline that appeared in Batman #620–625, written by Brian Azzarello and illustrated by Eduardo Risso.

== Storyline ==
Batman investigates the murder of Elizabeth Lupo, believed to have been killed by Killer Croc. Batman deduces that Lupo's brother Angel hired Croc to murder his sister. While chasing Angel down an alley, it appears the fleeing suspect murdered a father and mother leaving their son an orphan. Infuriated by the similarity of this murder to his own parents' murder, Batman interrogates various people, such as Margo Farr (Angel Lupo's lover), the Penguin and the Ventriloquist, in mad pursuit of Angel. At last Batman learns that Angel was innocent, Margo Farr hired Croc to murder Elizabeth and the newly orphaned boy murdered his own parents. All this time the Joker has been monitoring Batman's movements.

Following this story in the Batman comic book series are the events of As the Crow Flies.

== Collected editions ==
- Batman: Broken City (144 pages, hardcover, 2004, Titan Books, ISBN 1-84023-829-1, DC Comics, ISBN 1-4012-0133-4, softcover, 2005, Titan Books, ISBN 1-84023-922-0, DC Comics, ISBN 1-4012-0214-4)
