= Before Watchmen =

2012 comic book series published by DC Comics

Before Watchmen: Ozymandias artwork by Jae Lee

Before Watchmen is a series of comic books published by DC Comics in 2012. Acting as a prequel to the 1986 12-issue Watchmen limited series by writer Alan Moore and artist Dave Gibbons, the project consists of eight limited series and one one-shot (though two were planned) for a total of 37 issues.

== Publication history ==
Moore stated in 1985 that if the Watchmen limited series was well-received, he and Gibbons would possibly create a 12-issue prequel series called Minutemen featuring the 1940s superhero group from the story. DC offered Moore and Gibbons chances to publish prequels to the series, such as Rorschach's Journal or The Comedian's Vietnam War Diary, as well as hinting at the possibility of other authors using the same universe. Tales of the Comedian's Vietnam War experiences were floated because The 'Nam was popular at the time, while another suggestion was, according to Gibbons, for a "Nite Owl/Rorschach team" (in the manner of Randall and Hopkirk (Deceased), and also in the sense that the original Charlton characters Blue Beetle and The Question had worked together as a team from time-to-time). Neither man felt the stories would have gone anywhere, with Moore particularly adamant that DC not go forward with stories by other individuals. Gibbons was more attracted to the idea of a Minutemen series, because it would have "[paid] homage to the simplicity and unsophisticated nature of Golden Age comic books—with the added dramatic interest that it would be a story whose conclusion is already known. It would be, perhaps, interesting to see how we got to the conclusion."

In 2010, Moore told Wired that DC offered him the rights to Watchmen back earlier that week, if he would agree to prequel and sequel projects. Moore said that "if they said that 10 years ago, when I asked them for that, then yeah it might have worked ... But these days I don't want Watchmen back. Certainly, I don't want it back under those kinds of terms." DC Comics co-publishers Dan DiDio and Jim Lee responded, "DC Comics would only revisit these iconic characters if the creative vision of any proposed new stories matched the quality set by Alan Moore and Dave Gibbons nearly 25 years ago, and our first discussion on any of this would naturally be with the creators themselves."

Following months of rumors about a potential Watchmen follow-up project, in February 2012, DC announced seven prequel limited series under the "Before Watchmen" banner: Rorschach, Minutemen, Dr. Manhattan, Comedian, Silk Spectre, Nite Owl, and Ozymandias. The books were written by J. Michael Straczynski, Brian Azzarello, Darwyn Cooke, and Len Wein, and drawn by Lee Bermejo, J. G. Jones, Adam Hughes, Andy Kubert, Joe Kubert, and Amanda Conner. Every issue featured a two-page installment of the backup series "Curse of the Crimson Corsair" written by Len Wein and drawn by original Watchmen colorist John Higgins. The backup was inspired by the Tales of the Black Freighter story within a story from the original Watchmen. A Before Watchmen: Epilogue one-shot was announced but never published.

Gibbons stated,

The original series of Watchmen is the complete story that Alan Moore and I wanted to tell. However, I appreciate DC's reasons for this initiative and the wish of the artists and writers involved to pay tribute to our work. May these new additions have the success they desire.

Moore criticized the project, calling it "completely shameless", and stated he was not interested in monetary compensation, but rather “What I want is for this not to happen.” Moore elaborated,

What the comics industry has effectively said is, 'Yes, this was the only book that made us briefly special and that was because it wasn't like all the other books.' Watchmen was something that stood on its own and it had the integrity of a literary work. What they've decided now is, 'So, let's change it to a regular comic that can run indefinitely and have spin-offs.' and 'Let's make it as unexceptional as possible.' Like I say, they're doing this because they haven't got any other choices left, evidently.

== Titles ==
=== Before Watchmen: Minutemen (six issues) ===
Writer/Artist: Darwyn Cooke

Hollis Mason, the original Nite Owl, recounts his exploits with The Minutemen during the 1940s, while in the midst of his retirement, he faces opposition to the publication of his tell-all autobiography, Under the Hood in the early 1960s. Although it heavily retconned certain characters' backstories by suggesting that a large part of Under the Hood was dirty lies and cover ups, it debuted to positive reviews.

=== Before Watchmen: Silk Spectre (four issues) ===
Writers: Darwyn Cooke and Amanda Conner. Artist: Amanda Conner

The story follows Laurie Jupiter as she rebels against her mother Sally's efforts for Laurie to replace her as the Silk Spectre. Laurie runs away with her boyfriend to discover herself in the San Francisco counterculture of the 1960s. The story debuted to mixed reviews.

=== Before Watchmen: Comedian (six issues) ===
Writer: Brian Azzarello. Artist: J. G. Jones

The story reveals the Comedian's history with the Kennedy family during his exploits in the violent Vietnam Era. It debuted to mostly negative reviews.

=== Before Watchmen: Nite Owl (four issues) ===
Writer: J. Michael Straczynski. Artists: Andy and Joe Kubert

The plot takes place in the early 1960s, where 17-year-old Daniel Dreiberg is trained by Hollis Mason, the Nite Owl who led the vigilante team The Minutemen, as he narrates his first adventures as the second Nite Owl. Dreiberg and Rorschach did not get along, but they started an early partnership when they begin looking at a series of prostitute murders. Each recalled the abuse their mother suffered when they were children. Nite Owl inadvertently allows seduction into his world of vigilantism, courtesy of the dominatrix madam The Twilight Lady, while Rorschach turns toward religion, bringing the duo back together to solve the case. The story debuted to mostly positive reviews.

=== Before Watchmen: Ozymandias (six issues) ===
Writer: Len Wein. Artist: Jae Lee

As he awaits the final moment for his master plan to come together, Ozymandias reflects on what brought him there and makes an autobiographical recording of his life that spans 1939-1985 (when the story of Watchmen takes place). We see his early studies and adventures, the beginnings of his financial empire and his crime-fighting career, and his first unnerving encounters with The Comedian and Doctor Manhattan—the latter of which prompted him to build his Antarctic fortress of Karnak, aid in resolving the Cuban Missile Crisis, and retire from crime-fighting to concentrate on saving the world at any cost. The story debuted to mostly positive reviews.

=== Before Watchmen: Rorschach (four issues) ===
Writer: Brian Azzarello. Artist: Lee Bermejo

The story follows Rorschach in New York City, 1977, where his crime-fighting activities cause him to be targeted by a crime lord running drugs and prostitution in the sordid Times Square. While focused on the gang, Rorschach makes the mistake of allowing another predator to operate unchallenged. The story debuted to mixed reviews.

=== Before Watchmen: Dr. Manhattan (four issues) ===
Writer: J. Michael Straczynski. Artist: Adam Hughes

The story explores the different universes that Doctor Manhattan alias Jon Osterman simultaneously perceives. It also adds a notable new element to Osterman's backstory by revealing him to be a half-Jewish German immigrant who escaped with his father from the Third Reich to America; in the original Watchmen series, he was not implied to be anything other than American. It debuted to positive reviews.

=== Before Watchmen: Moloch (two issues) ===
Writer: J. Michael Straczynski. Artist: Eduardo Risso

Moloch, alias Edgar William Jacobi, was an ex-nemesis of the Minutemen. This story reveals information about Moloch's childhood, his turn to villainy, and new details surrounding his death. According to review aggregation website Comic Book Roundup, the series received an average score of 5.8/10 based on 12 critic reviews.

=== Before Watchmen: Dollar Bill (one-shot) ===
Writer: Len Wein. Artist: Steve Rude

The story explores Bill Brady, the corporate-sponsored superhero and Minutemen team member known as Dollar Bill.

=== Unpublished ===
==== Before Watchmen: Curse of the Crimson Corsair ====
Writers: Len Wein. Artists: John Higgins.

A series focused on Crimson Corsair was planned but Wein left to work on Before Watchmen: Epilogue. Higgins had also written and drawn the Crimson Corsair back-up features that appear in many of the Before Watchmen publications.

==== Before Watchmen: Epilogue (one-shot) ====
Writers: Various. Artists: Various

The planned Epilogue one-shot was cancelled. It would have featured a Crimson Corsair story written by Len Wein and drawn by John Higgins.

== Collected editions ==
Title	Material collected	Published date	ISBN
Before Watchmen: Minutemen/Silk Spectre	Before Watchmen: Minutemen #1-6 and Before Watchmen: Silk Spectre #1-4	July 2013	978-1401238926
Before Watchmen: Comedian/Rorschach	Before Watchmen: Comedian #1-6 and Before Watchmen: Rorschach #1-4	July 2013	978-1401245139
Before Watchmen: Nite Owl/Dr. Manhattan	Before Watchmen: Nite Owl #1-4, Before Watchmen: Dr. Manhattan #1-4 and Before Watchmen: Moloch #1-2	July 2013	978-1401238940
Before Watchmen: Ozymandias/Crimson Corsair	Before Watchmen: Ozymandias #1-6, Before Watchmen: Dollar Bill #1 and Before Watchmen: Crimson Corsair #1	July 2013	978-1401238957
Before Watchmen Omnibus	Before Watchmen: Comedian #1-6, Before Watchmen: Rorschach #1-4, Before Watchmen: Minutemen #1-6, Before Watchmen: Silk Spectre #1-4, Before Watchmen: Nite Owl #1-4, Before Watchmen: Dr. Manhattan #1-4, Before Watchmen: Moloch #1-2, Before Watchmen: Ozymandias #1-6, Before Watchmen: Crimson Corsair #1 and Before Watchmen: Dollar Bill #1	December 2018	978-1401285517

== In other media ==
The television series Watchmen is set 34 years after the original comic, and includes several events from Before Watchmen adapted in-universe as a television series titled American Hero Story: Minutemen.
