= Eduardo Risso =

Argentine comics artist (born 1959)

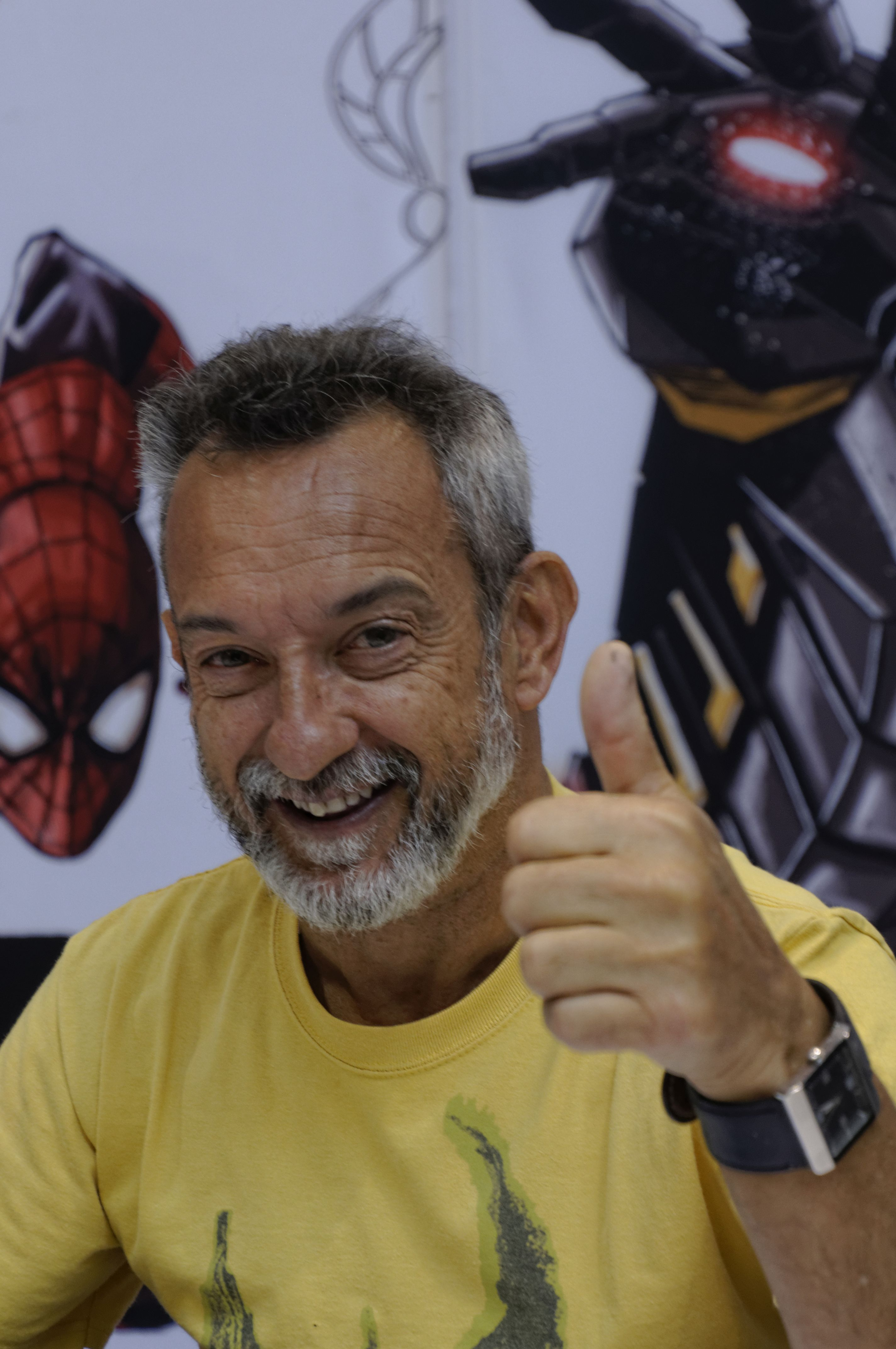
- Risso at the 2019 Comic Con Germany, in Stuttgart
- Born: 23 November 1959 (age 66) Leones, Córdoba Province, Argentina
- Area: Artist
- Notable works: 100 Bullets; Parque Chas; Fulù; Simon; Boy Vampiro
- Awards: Eisner Award, 2002; Harvey Award, 2002 and 2003; Inkpot Award, 2017

Eduardo Risso (born 23 November 1959) is an Argentine comics artist. In the United States he is best known for his work with writer Brian Azzarello on the Vertigo title 100 Bullets, while in Argentina and Europe he is noted for his collaborations with Ricardo Barreiro and Carlos Trillo. He has received much acclaim for his work.

He is the main creator of the popular Argentine comic convention Crack Bang Boom; a massive event which is held annually in the city of Rosario and is considered as the most important of its type in South America.

== Biography ==
Risso was born in Leones in Córdoba Province, Argentina, and started as a cartoonist in 1981, drawing his first collaborations for the morning newspaper La Nación and the magazines Eroticón and Satiricón, all published by Editorial Columba. In 1986, he worked for Eura Editoriale of Rome, Italy, and in 1987 he drew Parque Chas, scripted by Ricardo Barreiro. The series was first published by Fierro in Argentina and then by Totem in Spain, Comic Art in Italy and finally the complete series as an album in France, Germany, Denmark, Belgium, the Netherlands, Poland and the United States. In 1988, he drew Cain, again scripted by Barreiro.

Later that same year, Risso drew Fulù, scripted by Carlos Trillo, published in Italy, France, Germany, Portugal, the Netherlands, and in Argentina in the Puertitas magazine. The Trillo-Risso duo also created Simon: An American Tale, published in Italy and France, Borderline, published in Italy and Chicanos, published in Italy and France.

Risso and writer Brian Azzarello launched the 100 Bullets series for Vertigo in August 1999. Azzarello and Risso collaborated on several Batman stories as well including "Broken City" in Batman #620–625 (December 2003 – May 2004); a Batman serial for Wednesday Comics #1–12 (2009); and the Flashpoint: Batman Knight of Vengeance limited series in 2011. Other projects from the team include Spaceman and the 100 Bullets: Brother Lono limited series. Risso and writer J. Michael Straczynski produced the Before Watchmen: Moloch two-issue limited series in 2013. Paul Dini's Dark Night: A True Batman Story graphic novel was drawn by Risso in 2016. He also started work on the Image Comics series Moonshine.

In 2010 he created the Argentine event Crack Bang Boom, a comics/Argentine comics, cartoon, cosplay, fantasy and science-fiction convention, which is annually held in the city of Rosario. Hosted and organized by Risso with a group of collaborators and with support from the Municipality of Rosario, Crack Bang Boom has become the most famous convention of its type in Argentina, as well as one of the most important events for the comics world in South America.

== Awards ==
Risso has won five Eisner Awards for his work on "100 Bullets" and "Blood Brother's Mother" with Brian Azzarello. He won for the "Best Serialized Story" in 2001; for "Best Continuing Series" in 2002 and 2004; and for "Best Artist" in 2002. He won the Harvey Award for "Best Artist" in 2002 and 2003. Risso received an Inkpot Award in 2017.

== Bibliography ==
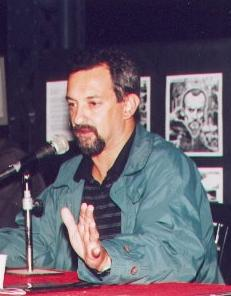
Eduardo Risso at the comic convention Leyendas, in Rosario, Argentina, 2001.

1980s (Argentine years)

- 1987 – Parque Chas (written by Ricardo Barreiro, serialized in Heavy Metal as Park Charles, 1997–2001)
- 1988 – Cain (written by Ricardo Barreiro, U.S. edition 2003 Strip Art Features)
- 1989 – Fulù (written by Carlos Trillo)

1990s (European years)

- 1992 – Simon, Una Aventura Americana (written by Carlos Trillo)
- 1994 – Video Nocturno (written by Carlos Trillo, U.S. edition 2001 Dark Horse/SAF "Vidéo Noire")
- 1995 – Boy Vampiro (written by Carlos Trillo, U.S. edition 2003–2004 Strip Art Features Boy Vampire)
- 1996 – Borderline (written by Carlos Trillo, U.S. edition 2005 announced by Dynamite Entertainment)
- 1996 – Horror Revisitado (written by Carlos Trillo, serialized in Heavy Metal)
- 1997 – Chicanos (written by Carlos Trillo, U.S. edition 2005–2006 IDW Publishing eight issues)

1997 (U.S. debut)

- 1997/07 – Aliens Wraith, Dark Horse Comics
- 1997/09 and 11 – Alien: Resurrection, Dark Horse Comics
- 1997/09 – "Slippery Woman" (in Heavy Metal)
- 1998 – Los Misterios de la Luna Roja, (U.S. edition 2005–2006, Strip Art Features, four volumes)
- 1998/03 – "Indecision" (in Heavy Metal)
- 1998/05 – "Incompatibility" (in Heavy Metal)
- 1998/09-12 – Jonny Double (four issue miniseries), DC Comics
- 1998/11 – "Costume Party" (in Heavy Metal)

1999 (100 Bullets begins)

- 1999 – 100 Bullets (issues #1–5), DC Comics
- 1999/03 – "The Death of a Romantic" (in Heartthrobs #3), DC Comics
- 1999/08 – "Food Chain" (in Flinch #2), DC Comics

2000

- 2000 – 100 Bullets (issues #6–17), DC Comics
- 2000/01 – 100 Bullets Vol. 1: First Shot, Last Call, DC Comics
- 2000/01 – Vertigo: Winter's Edge #3: "Silencer Night", DC Comics
- 2000/03 – Transmetropolitan #31, DC Comics
- 2000/04 – Transmetropolitan: I Hate it Here #1, DC Comics
- 2000/05 – "Spring Fever" (in Heavy Metal)
- 2000/08 – "Batman: Scars" (Batman Black and White back-up story in Batman: Gotham Knights #8), DC Comics

2001

- 2001 – 100 Bullets (issues #18–29), DC Comics
- 2001/02 – 100 Bullets Vol. 2: Split Second Chance, DC Comics
- 2001/03 – "The Swamp Monster Strikes Again" (in Heavy Metal)
- 2001/04 – "Once Upon a Time in the Future" (in Weird Western Tales #3), DC Comics
- 2001/07 – Spider-Man's Tangled Web #4: "Severance Package", Marvel Comics
- 2001/11 – 100 Bullets Vol.3: Hang Up on the Hang Low, DC Comics

2002

- 2002 – 100 Bullets (issues #30–39), DC Comics
- 2002/01- "911: America's Pastime" (in 9-11: The World's Finest Comic Book Writers & Artists Tell Stories to Remember, Volume Two)
- 2002/01- Superman pinup (in The Adventures of Superman #600), DC Comics
- 2002/05 – Alan Moore – Monographie
- 2002/06 – 100 Bullets Vol. 4: A Foregone Tomorrow, DC Comics
- 2002/07 – Green Lantern pinup (in Green Lantern Secret Files and Origins #3), DC Comics

2003

- 2003 – 100 Bullets (issues #40–47), DC Comics
- 2003 – Bernet (pinup in Art Book)
- 2003/03 – 100 Bullets Vol. 5: The Counterfifth Detective, DC Comics
- 2003/04 – Vertigo X Preview (pinup), DC Comics
- 2003/09 – 100 Bullets Vol. 6: Six Feet Under the Gun, DC Comics
- 2003/10 – 2004/03 – Batman #620–625 (2003–2004), collected in Batman: Broken City, DC Comics
- 2003/10 – JSA All-Stars #6

(Doctor Mid-Nite story), DC Comics

2004

- 2005 – 100 Bullets (#48–54), DC Comics
- 2004/03 – Wonder Woman vol. 2 #200 (pinup), DC Comics
- 2004/07 – 100 Bullets Vol. 7: Samurai, DC Comics
- 2004/09 – Eduardo Risso: Black. White

2005

- 2005 – 100 Bullets (#55–65), DC Comics
- 2005/02 – Batman Black and White statue, DC Comics
- 2005/04 – Vertigo: First Taste
- 2005/07 – 100 Bullets Vol. 8: The Hard Way, DC Comics

2006

- 2006 – 100 Bullets (issues #66–77), DC Comics
- 2006/04 – 100 Bullets Vol. 9: Strychnine Lives, DC Comics

2007

- 2007 – 100 Bullets (issues #78–85), DC Comics

2008

- 2008 – 100 Bullets (issues #86–96), DC Comics
- 2008 – Logan #1–3, Marvel Comics
- 2008 – The Spirit #13, DC Comics

2009

- 2008 – 100 Bullets (issues #97–100), DC Comics
- 2009 – Wednesday Comics #1–12 (Batman serial), DC Comics

2010

- 2010 – DMZ #50 (pinup), DC Comics
- 2010 – Vampire Boy, Dark Horse Comics

2011

- 2011 – Jonah Hex #62, DC Comics
- 2011 – Strange Adventures vol. 4 #1, DC Comics
- 2011 – Flashpoint: Batman Knight of Vengeance #1–3, DC Comics
- 2011 – Spaceman #1, DC Comics

2012

- 2012 – Spaceman #2–9, DC Comics

2013

- 2013 – Before Watchmen: Moloch #1–2, DC Comics
- 2013 – 100 Bullets: Brother Lono #1–5, DC Comics

2014

- 2014 – 100 Bullets: Brother Lono #6–8, DC Comics

2016

- 2016 – Dark Night: A True Batman Story, DC Comics
- 2016 – Moonshine #1–3, Image Comics
- 2016 – The Dark Knight III: The Master Race #2 (Wonder Woman story), DC Comics

2017

- 2017 – Moonshine #4–6, Image Comics

2018

- 2018 – Moonshine #7–12, Image Comics

2019

- 2019 – The Batman Who Laughs: The Grim Knight #1, DC Comics
- 2019 – Batman Secret Files #2, DC Comics
- 2019 – Moonshine #13–14, Image Comics

2020

- 2020 – Detective Comics Annual #3, DC Comics
- 2020 – Moonshine #15–22, Image Comics

2021

- 2021 – Moonshine #23–28, Image Comics

2022

- 2022 – Flashpoint Beyond #0, DC Comics
- 2022 – DC Horror Presents: Sgt. Rock vs. The Army of the Dead #1–4, DC Comics

2023

- 2023 – DC Horror Presents: Sgt. Rock vs. The Army of the Dead #5–6, DC Comics

=== Covers only ===
- Red Sonja #5 (Dynamite Entertainment, 2006)
- Superman #700 (DC Comics, 2010)
- First Wave #5 (DC Comics, 2011)
- Before Watchmen: Comedian #1 (DC Comics, 2012)
- Order #1 (Chispa Comics, 2025)

Preceded by Jim Lee	Batman penciller 2003–2004	Succeeded by Dustin Nguyen
