= Red Dragon (comics) =

Red Dragon, in comics, may refer to:

- Red Dragon, a DC Comics supervillain
- Red Dragon, a character from Grant Morrison's series Zenith
- Red Dragon, a Comico Comics character who was connected to the Elementals
- Red Dragon, the personification of the symbol of Wales who appeared in the Marvel MAX limited series Wisdom
- Red Dragon, a Tower Comics character who appeared in T.H.U.N.D.E.R. Agents

== See also ==
- Red dragon (disambiguation)
- Dragon (disambiguation)
