= Joker (graphic novel) =

2008 graphic novel by DC Comics

- Date: October 17, 2008
- Main characters: Joker; Jonny Frost; Batman; Killer Croc; Riddler; Two-Face; Harley Quinn; Penguin
- Page count: 128 pages
- Publisher: DC Comics

Creative team
- Writers: Brian Azzarello
- Artists: Lee Bermejo
- Inkers: Mick Gray
- Letterers: Robert Clark
- Colourists: Patricia Mulvihill
- ISBN: 1401215815

Joker is an American graphic novel published by DC Comics in 2008. Written by Brian Azzarello and illustrated by Lee Bermejo, it is based on characters from DC's Batman series, focusing primarily on the title character. It is a unique take on the Batman mythos, set outside regular continuity and narrated by one of the Joker's henchmen. The miniseries Batman: Damned is a stand-alone sequel to the graphic novel, with the miniseries incorporating certain details, settings, and designs that hint at the two stories sharing a connected narrative.

== Publication history ==
Azzarello and Bermejo had previously worked on a similar take on Superman's archenemy in Lex Luthor: Man of Steel, and Joker grew out of a discussion following completion of that project. DC Editor Dan DiDio approved the new project the following day. The initial plan was to reflect this connection with a title sharing the same structure, Joker: The Dark Knight but was felt to be too similar to the film The Dark Knight, and so the name was shortened. When the writer was asked if he preferred writing villains he said: "I relate to them. [Laughs] I don't relate to the heroes. The Man, tryin' to keep you down!"

== Plot ==
Jonny Frost, a low-level thug, is sent to Arkham Asylum to pick up the newly released Joker, who immediately takes a liking to Frost, using him as a chauffeur. Frost drives Joker to the lair of Killer Croc. The three go to a strip bar called the Grin and Bare It. With the help of Harley Quinn, Joker kills one of his former henchmen and claims his intention to make Gotham City his again. Joker robs a bank and coaxes the Penguin to invest the stolen money. Joker embarks on a killing spree, murdering many thugs who stole his money, turf, and bizarre sense of reputation. He is then informed by Penguin that Harvey Dent, his chief rival for control of Gotham, is avoiding him, enraging Joker. Frost is detained by Dent, who warns him that Joker will kill him, but Frost delusionally believes he is an equal partner to Joker. Subsequently, Frost is late to Joker's meeting with the Riddler, a disabled weapons dealer. They exchange a briefcase, and Joker and his crew leave. Once on the road, they are attacked by crooked off-duty cops hired by Dent, and Frost saves Joker's life in the scuffle.

Joker embarks on a turf war against Dent, prompting him to meet with Joker at the city zoo. Bringing the briefcase he received from Riddler, Joker says he has learned Dent has two wives, and threatens to use the contents of the briefcase as leverage against him. Joker slashes Dent's wrist and Harley ambushes and executes his men. After helping Frost get his ex-wife Shelly back from Dent, Joker rapes her in front of Frost, saying this makes them "even", since Frost "cheated" on Joker by not revealing his own meeting with Dent. Later, Harvey paints a bat on a spotlight to get Batman's attention, and pleads with him to stop Joker. Joker and Frost flee from Batman, who subdues Harley and Croc in the process, and pursues them to a nearby bridge. While Joker is "screaming through tears", Frost inexplicably finds himself laughing, unable to stop. They find Batman in wait, and Joker demands to know why Batman disguises himself as a monster but spoils the illusion by leaving his mouth exposed. Batman replies, "To mock you". Joker goes berserk and shoots Frost in the chin, leaving him with a Glasgow smile. Joker and Batman fight as Frost climbs over the edge of the bridge and falls into the river, narrating that he has finally realized how ruinous his relationship with Joker was.

== Reception ==
The graphic novel generally received positive reviews. IGN commented that "Brian Azzarello and Lee Bermejo's Joker is a deeply disturbing and completely unnerving work, a literary achievement that takes its place right alongside Alan Moore's The Killing Joke as one of the few successful attempts to scratch beneath the surface of the Joker's impenetrable psyche". AICN noted that "the story is compelling, especially the gut-wrenching showdown at the end of the book, and the art is mouth-wateringly good".

== In other media ==
=== Film ===
- Jonny Frost appears as one of Joker's henchmen in the 2016 film Suicide Squad, portrayed by Jim Parrack. Harley Quinn is also depicted as a nightclub stripper similar to what was showcased in the graphic novel.
- In 2016, Brian Azzarello said that he would like to adapt his novel into an animated film.
