= Batman: Gotham Knights =

American comic book series

- Cover to Batman: Gotham Knights #43 (2003), featuring Batman and two of his allies: Batgirl and Robin. The cover mirrors the first appearance of Barbara Gordon's Batgirl; art by Brian Bolland.

Publication information
- Publisher: DC Comics
- Schedule: Monthly
- Format: Ongoing series
- Genre: Superhero
- Publication date: March 2000 – April 2006
- No. of issues: 74
- Main character: Batman

Creative team
- Written by: Devin Grayson; Scott Beatty; A. J. Lieberman
- Penciller(s): Dale Eaglesham; Paul Ryan; Roger Robinson; Al Barrionuevo; Dick Giordano; Javier Pina; Leonardo Manco
- Inker(s): John Floyd; Bit
- Letterer(s): Bill Oakley; Clem Robins
- Colorist(s): Wildstorm FX; Pamela Rambo
- Editor(s): Joseph Illidge; Dennis O'Neil

Collected editions
- Batman Black and White Volume 2: ISBN 1-56389-828-4
- Batman Black and White Volume 3: ISBN 978-1-4012-1531-6

Batman: Gotham Knights is a monthly American comic book series that was published by DC Comics. The original intent of this book was to feature the exploits of Batman and his extended family, such as Alfred Pennyworth, Batgirl, Nightwing, Robin, Oracle, and Catwoman, among others. The latter section of the run, however, came to focus much more upon his enemies.

The series also featured the popular "Batman: Black and White" back-up strip, which allowed various artists with widely varying styles to do their take on the Dark Knight in a black and white format. These back-up strips are also collected in trade paperback form. Contributors to this section include Jim Lee, John Byrne, John Buscema, Eduardo Risso, Jordi Bernet, José Luis García-López, Kyle Baker, Harlan Ellison, Dave Gibbons, Gene Ha, Gene Colan, Enrique Breccia, Claudio Castellini, Dick Giordano, Christian Alamy, Jason Pearson, Mike Wieringo, Alan Davis, Chris Bachalo, Denys Cowan, John Watkiss, Mike Kaluta, and Whilce Portacio.

== Publication history ==
Batman: Gotham Knights began in the wake of the Batman: No Man's Land event, a year-long crossover event that had involved all main Batman titles. No Man's Land was followed by a soft relaunch of the main Batman titles, with new creative teams and new editorial direction; as part of this shakeup, the series Batman: Shadow of the Bat was cancelled and replaced with Batman: Gotham Knights. The original creative team consisted of writer Devin Grayson, the first ongoing female writer on a main Batman title, and alternating pencillers Dale Eaglesham and Paul Ryan. Meanwhile, the eight-page black-and-white backup stories were each written and drawn by different writers and artists. Issue #1, titled "Constraints", was published on January 19, 2000 (with a cover date of March). Ongoing penciller Roger Robinson began working on the series from issue #8, "Transference Part 1".

Issues #25–31 were integrated into the Bruce Wayne – Murderer? and Bruce Wayne – Fugitive crossover storylines. Grayson's run as writer ended at issue #32 with the critically-acclaimed one-issue story "24/7" showing a full day in the life of Batman. Scott Beatty then took over as writer from issue #33, with Robinson remaining as penciller. Beatty departed the series after issue #49, at which point the "Batman: Black and White" backup stories also ended.

The series was reinvented from issue #50 under the new creative team of writer A.J. Lieberman and penciller Al Barrionuevo: where previously the series had focused on Batman and the wider Bat-family of superheroes, the series shifted focus to examine Batman's relationships with his villains. Batman: Gotham Knights ultimately ran for a total of 74 issues with the last issue cover-dated April 2006. This title was among several which were cancelled at the conclusion of the Infinite Crisis storyline, before DC's "One Year Later" line-wide relaunch. The final story arc was left unresolved but was closed with Paul Dini's Detective Comics arc Heart of Hush.

== Collected editions ==
Although Batman: Gotham Knights was originally uncollected at the time of publication, the majority of Devin Grayson's run as writer of the series has since been collected into two trade paperback volumes. The first story arc written by A.J. Lieberman was also collected in trade paperback form around the time of its original publication.

Title	Material collected	Publication date	ISBN
Batman: Gotham Knights – Transference	Batman: Gotham Knights #1–12	January 1, 2020	978-1-4012-9407-6
Batman: Gotham Knights – Contested	Batman: Gotham Knights #14–24 and #32	February 23, 2021	978-1-77950-306-0
Batman: Hush Returns	Batman: Gotham Knights #50–55 and 66	January 11, 2006	978-1-4012-0900-1

Issues of Batman: Gotham Knights have also been included in collections of crossover events involving multiple Batman-related titles:

- Issue #13 was included in the paperback collection Batman: Officer Down, published August 2001.
- Issues #25–32 were included in the original collections of Batman: Bruce Wayne – Murderer? and Batman: Bruce Wayne – Fugitive, published 2002 to 2003, and the new editions published in 2014.
- Issues #56–58 were included in the original collected editions of Batman: War Games, published in 2005, and the new editions published 2015 to 2016.

Additionally, individual stories from Batman: Gotham Knights have been included in other collected editions. Issue #10, "Guardian", was included in Legends of the Dark Knight: José Luis García-López, published in November 2021. Issue #23, "Fear of Success", was included in Batman: Scarecrow Tales, published April 2005. Issue #32, "24/7", was included in the first volume of Batman: The Greatest Stories Ever Told, also published April 2005. Several stories were also included in the Batman: Arkham trade paperback collections, published 2017 to present:

- Batman: Arkham – Hugo Strange included the four-part story "Transference" from issues #8-11.
- Batman: Arkham – Mister Freeze included "Fire & Ice" from issue #59.
- Batman: Arkham – Clayface included the four-part story "The Shape of Things to Come" from issues #68-71.

The "Batman: Black and White" backup stories published in issues #1-49 have been collected in their own series of hardcover and paperback collections. The stories from issues #1-16 were included alongside five never-before-published stories in Batman: Black and White Volume 2, initially published in September 2002 as a hardcover book and republished in October 2003 as an oversized softcover. The backup stories from issues #17-49 Batman: Black and White Volume 3 were published as a comics-sized hardcover in May 2007, while a softcover edition was released in 2008.

== See also ==
- Detective Comics
- The New Batman Adventures
