= The Unbelievables (comics) =

Ghost Machine comics publishing line

- Created by: Geoff Johns; Peter J. Tomasi; Francis Manapul

Publication information
- Publisher: Ghost Machine Productions / Image Comics
- Genre: Comedy, fantasy, science fiction
- Publication date: May 2026

The Unbelievables (originally named Family Odysseys) is a line of American comic books published by Ghost Machine Productions through Image Comics. The comic line centers on characters with extraordinary origins who attempt to live ordinary lives, including a time-traveling family living in the present, two teenagers connected to Heaven and Hell, and a thirteen-year-old trillionaire who searches for those people.

In 2026, the line was rebranded after debuting a crossover event titled "Who Are the Unbelievables?" between June and August 2026.

== Premise ==
The Unbelievables is a shared universe published by Ghost Machine through Image Comics, co-created primarily by Peter J. Tomasi, Geoff Johns, Francis Manapul, and Peter Snejbjerg. In contrast to dark post-apocalyptic or horror imprints within the publisher's lineup (such as The Unnamed and Hyde Street), The Unbelievables focuses on lighthearted, high-concept urban fantasy, science fiction, and coming-of-age stories centered on extraordinary teenagers and families hiding in plain sight in everyday contemporary society.

== Titles ==
=== Ongoing series ===
Title	Writer	Artist	Colorist	Debut date
The Rocketfellers	Peter Tomasi	Francis Manapul	John Kalisz	November 20, 2024
Hornsby & Halo	Peter Tomasi	Peter Snejbjerg		November 27, 2024
Jean Genie	Maytal Zchut	Leila Leisz	TBA	TBA 2026

=== Limited series ===
Title	Issues	Writer	Artist	Colorist	Debut date	Conclusion date
The Trillion Dollar Kid	2	Geoff Johns and Peter Tomasi	Stefano Simeone		June 17, 2026	August 12, 2026

=== One-shots ===
Title	Writer	Artist	Colorist	Debut date
Ghost Machine	Geoff Johns, Lamont Magee, Peter Tomasi and Maytal Zchut	Gary Frank, Bryan Hitch, Jason Fabok, Francis Manapul, Peter Snejbjerg and Ivan Reis	Brad Anderson, Francis Manapul and Bjarne Hansen	January 24, 2024
The Rocketfellers #0	Peter Tomasi and Francis Manapul	Francis Manapul		May 20, 2026
Hornsby & Halo #0	Peter Tomasi	Peter Snejbjerg	John Kalisz	May 27, 2026

=== Tie-in material ===
- Ghost Machine: The Official Guidebook #3

=== Crossover event ===
Part	Issue	Release date
Who Are the Unbelievables?
1	The Rocketfellers #0	May 20, 2026
2	Hornsby & Halo #0	May 27, 2026
3	The Trillion Dollar Kid #1	May 17, 2026
4	Hornsby & Halo #14	June 24, 2026
5	The Rocketfellers #13	July 15, 2026
6	The Trillion Dollar Kid #2	August 12, 2025

== Reception ==
The comic line received generally positive reviews, with The Rocketfellers being praised for its world-building, high-concept premise, and the collaborative artwork between writer Peter J. Tomasi and artist Francis Manapul. Critical reception for Hornsby & Halo emphasized its character-driven narrative, tone, and urban fantasy elements. The Trillion Dollar Kid received favorable reviews from comic critics, who highlighted its central protagonist, emotional themes, and visual design.

== Collected editions ==
Title	Material collected	Pages	Release date	ISBN
Hornsby & Halo
Nature vs Nurture	Hornsby & Halo #1–6	176	September 3, 2025	ISBN 9781534330351
Volume 2	Hornsby & Halo #7–12	184	May 6, 2026	ISBN 9781534335455
The Rocketfellers
First Family of the Future	The Rocketfellers #1–6	176	September 10, 2025	ISBN 9781534333529
Volume 2	The Rocketfellers #7–12	152	August 5, 2026	ISBN 9781534334205
The Trillion Dollar Kid
Who Are the Unbelievables?	Hornsby & Halo #0, #14; The Rocketfellers #0, #13; The Trillion Dollar Kid #1–2	160	September 30, 2026	ISBN 9781534332706
