= The Unnamed (comics) =

American comic book franchise

- Created by: Geoff Johns, Gary Frank

Publication information
- Publisher: Image Comics
- Schedule: Monthly
- Formats: Ongoing series, limited series, and graphic novels
- Genre: Historical fantasy, science fiction, post-apocalyptic fiction
- Publication date: 2021–present

The Unnamed is an American comic book franchise published by Image Comics and Ghost Machine. It is one of Ghost Machine's shared fictional universes and includes the series Geiger, Junkyard Joe, and Redcoat.

The franchise centers on a group of genre characters connected across an alternate secret history, including the post-apocalyptic figure Geiger, the robotic soldier Junkyard Joe, and the immortal soldier Simon Pure, also known as Redcoat.

== Publication history ==
Characters and stories later associated with The Unnamed began with Geiger, a six-issue series by writer Geoff Johns, artist Gary Frank, colorist Brad Anderson, and letterer Rob Leigh, published by Image Comics in 2021. It was followed by Junkyard Joe in 2022 and Geiger: Ground Zero in 2023.

Ghost Machine was announced at New York Comic Con in October 2023 as a creator-owned media company publishing through Image Comics. Its first official release, Ghost Machine #1, introduced several of the company's shared universes, including The Unnamed.

In 2024, the franchise expanded with the ongoing series Geiger and Redcoat, both launched in April, and the graphic novel Tales of the Unnamed: The Blizzard, written by Johns and illustrated by Andrea Mutti. In 2025, Ghost Machine announced First Ghost, written by Brad Meltzer and Johns with art by Gene Ha, as another entry in The Unnamed universe.

== Premise ==
The Unnamed is set in an alternate timeline in which unusual figures appear across American history and into a post-apocalyptic future. Redcoat begins during the American Revolutionary War, Junkyard Joe is connected to the Vietnam War, and Geiger is set after a nuclear conflict known as the Unknown War.

== Characters ==
- Geiger (Tariq Geiger)
- Junkyard Joe
- Redcoat (Simon Pure)
- The Northerner (Malcolm North)
- Widow X (Sylvia Hollow)

== Publications ==
=== Ongoing series ===
Title	Writer	Artist	Colorist	Debut date
Geiger (vol. 2)	Geoff Johns	Gary Frank	Brad Anderson	April 3, 2024
Redcoat	Geoff Johns	Bryan Hitch and Andrew Currie	Brad Anderson	April 3, 2024

=== Limited series ===
Title	Issues	Writer	Artist	Colorist	Debut date	Finale date
Geiger (vol. 1)	6	Geoff Johns	Gary Frank	Brad Anderson	April 7, 2021	September 1st, 2021
Junkyard Joe	6	Geoff Johns	Gary Frank	Brad Anderson	October 5, 2022	May 10, 2023
Geiger: Ground Zero	2	Geoff Johns	Gary Frank	Brad Anderson	November 15, 2023	December 20, 2023
First Ghost	TBA	Brad Meltzer and Geoff Johns	Gene Ha	TBA	TBA 2027	TBA

=== One-shots ===
Title	Writer	Artist	Colorist	Debut date
Geiger 80-Page Giant	Jay Faerber, Sterling Gates, Janet Harvey, Leon Hendrix III, Pornsak Pichetshote and Peter Tomasi	Gary Frank, Sean Galloway, Kelley Jones, Staz Johnson, Megan Levens, Paul Pelletier & Tony Kordos and Joe Prado	Brad Anderson, Anderson Cabral, Sean Galloway, Hi-Fi, John Kalisz, Charlie Kirchoff, and Dijjo Lima	February 2, 2022
Ghost Machine	Geoff Johns, Lamont Magee, Peter Tomasi and Maytal Zchut	Gary Frank, Bryan Hitch, Jason Fabok, Francis Manapul, Peter Snejbjerg and Ivan Reis	Brad Anderson, Francis Manapul and Bjarne Hansen	January 24, 2024
Radioactive Revolution	Geoff Johns	Gary Frank and Bryan Hitch	TBA	February 10, 2027

=== Graphic novel ===
Title	Writer	Artist	Colorist	Debut date
Tales of the Unnamed: The Blizzard	Geoff Johns	Andrea Mutti		July 24, 2024

=== Tie-in material ===
- Ghost Machine. The Official Guidebook #1–2

=== Crossover event ===
Part	Issue	Release date
Radioactive Revolution
1	Geiger (vol. 2) #25	September 9, 2026
2	Radioactive Revolution #1	February 10, 2027
3	Geiger (vol. 2) #26	March 2027
4	Redcoat #23	March 2027
5	Geiger (vol. 2) #27	April 2027
6	Redcoat #24	April 2027
7	Geiger (vol. 2) #28	May 2027

== Collected editions ==
=== Trade paperbacks ===
#	Title	Material collected	Pages	Released	ISBN
Geiger
1	Geiger, Volume 1	Geiger (Vol. 1) #1-6	160	November 30, 2021	978-1534320024
2	The Nuclear Knight	Geiger (Vol. 2) #1-6; Material from Geiger: 80-Page Giant #1	160	February 18, 2025	978-1534380202
3	Geiger, Volume 3	Geiger (Vol. 2) #7-9; Geiger: Ground Zero #1-2	160	June 18, 2025	978-1534332256
4	Geiger, Volume 4	Geiger (Vol. 2) #10-15	152	November 18, 2025	978-1534335202
5	Geiger, Volume 5	Geiger (Vol. 2) #16-21	192	July 14, 2026	978-1534335868
Junkyard Joe
	Junkyard Joe	Junkyard Joe #1-6	208	June 7, 2023	978-1534325890
Tales of the Unnamed
	The Blizzard	Material from Image! 30th Anniversary Anthology #1-12	112	July 24, 2024	978-1534397132
Redcoat
1	Einstein and the Immortal	Redcoat #1-7; Material from Geiger: 80-Page Giant #1	192	March 18, 2025	978-1534373181
2	American Icons	Redcoat #8-14	152	November 18, 2025	978-1534331242
3	Readcoat, Volume 3	Redcoat #15-22	232	April 27, 2027	978-1534333567

=== Hardcover editions ===
Title	Material collected	Pages	Release date
Geiger
Geiger: Deluxe Edition Vol. 1	Geiger vol. 1 #1–6 and material from Geiger 80-Page Giant #1	272	June 4, 2024
Geiger: Deluxe Edition Vol. 2	Geiger vol. 2 #1–9	256	December 3, 2025
Geiger: Deluxe Edition Vol. 3	Geiger: Ground Zero #1-2, Geiger vol. 2 #10–23	480	January 5, 2027
Junkyard Joe
Junkyard Joe: Deluxe Edition	Junkyard Joe #1–6	208	November 27, 2024
Redcoat
Redcoat: Deluxe Edition Vol. 1	Redcoat #1–14	472	May 6, 2026

== Reception ==
Library Journal reviewed positively the first volume of the series (Geiger), calling it "a sparkling gem in this genre", while the first volume of Redcoat received a four-star review from the French Zoo magazine.

== Other media ==
In October 2022, it was announced that a television adaptation of Geiger was in development at Paramount Television Studios, with Geoff Johns developing the series alongside Justin Simien. Johns would serve as showrunner, write the pilot script, and serve as executive producer alongside Simien and Gary Frank.

In November 2025, it was announced that Ghost Machine had partnered with Atlas Entertainment to develop a feature film based on Redcoat. Charles Roven and Alex Gartner serve as producers of the film, with Johns penning the screenplay based on a story by him and Bryan Hitch.
