= Rook (comics) =

American comic book series

Publication information
- Publisher: Image Comics / Ghost Machine
- Schedule: Monthly
- Format: Ongoing series
- Genre: Science fiction, post-apocalyptic fiction
- Publication date: April 2024–present
- Main character: Rook

Creative team
- Created by: Geoff Johns; Jason Fabok
- Written by: Geoff Johns
- Artist: Jason Fabok
- Letterer(s): Rob Leigh; Dire Wolf
- Colorist: Brad Anderson

Rook is an American science fiction comic book franchise created by writer Geoff Johns and artist Jason Fabok, published by Image Comics through the creator-owned company Ghost Machine. The series debuted on April 3, 2024.

The story follows a farmer known as Rook, who leaves a collapsing Earth for the terraformed planet Exodus. On Exodus, humans called Wardens control aspects of nature and imported animal life through specialized helmets, but the planet falls into chaos after its world engine fails.

== Publication history ==
Rook was launched as one of Ghost Machine's creator-owned titles published through Image Comics. The first issue was released on April 3, 2024.

The series titled Rook: Exodus is written by Geoff Johns, illustrated by Jason Fabok, colored by Brad Anderson, and lettered by Rob Leigh.

In 2025, Image Comics and Ghost Machine announced that the series would return with a second story arc beginning in Rook: Exodus #7. The arc introduced new Wardens and focused on Rook and Dire Wolf searching for Bloodhound, who may be able to restore Exodus's failing world engine.

== Premise ==
Hundreds of years in the future, Rook is a former farmer who fled Earth for Exodus, a terraformed world where every part of nature is managed by humans known as Wardens. After the world engine fails, the Wardens' control over nature collapses, and Exodus becomes a dying planet. Rook, an avian Warden, must decide whether to flee or fight for the planet's survival.

== Titles ==
=== Ongoing series ===
| Title | Writer | Artist | Colorist | Debut date |
|---|---|---|---|---|
| Rook: Exodus | Geoff Johns | Jason Fabok | Brad Anderson | April 3, 2024 |

=== Limited series ===
| Title | Writer | Artist | Colorist | Debut date |
|---|---|---|---|---|
| Rook: Wardens — Dire Wolf | Geoff Johns | Ed Benes | TBA | TBA 2026 |

=== One-shot ===
| Title | Writer(s) | Artist(s) | Colourist(s) | Debut date |
|---|---|---|---|---|
| Ghost Machine | Geoff Johns, Lamont Magee, Peter Tomasi and Maytal Zchut | Gary Frank, Bryan Hitch, Jason Fabok, Francis Manapul, Peter Snejbjerg and Ivan Reis | Brad Anderson, Francis Manapul and Bjarne Hansen | January 24, 2024 |

=== Tie-in material ===
- Ghost Machine. The Official Guidebook #4

== Reception ==
The series received generally positive reviews from comics critics. Comic Book Roundup reported an average critic rating of 8.9 out of 10 for Rook: Exodus, based on 49 reviews.

Matt Fischer of Impulse Gamer praised the first issue as a strong opening act for a science fiction epic, highlighting the artwork and characters. Mariano Abrach of Zona Negativa described the series as a post-apocalyptic science fiction epic, while noting that some of its genre elements were familiar.

Reviewing Rook: Exodus #8 for AIPT, Collier Jennings wrote that the series shifted further into horror while continuing its science fiction adventure elements, praising Fabok's post-apocalyptic imagery and the character dynamics written by Johns.

== Collected editions ==
| Title | Material collected | Publication date | ISBN |
|---|---|---|---|
| Rook: Exodus, Volume One: Fight or Flight | Rook: Exodus #1–6 | April 22, 2025 | ISBN 9781534367364 |
| Rook: Exodus, Volume Two | Rook: Exodus #7–12 | February 2, 2027 | ISBN 9781534331181 |
