= Hyde Street (comics) =

American horror comic book series

Publication information
- Publisher: Image Comics / Ghost Machine
- Schedule: Monthly
- Format: Ongoing series
- Genre: Horror
- Publication date: October 2024 – present

Creative team
- Created by: Geoff Johns; Ivan Reis
- Written by: Geoff Johns
- Artist: Ivan Reis
- Inker: Danny Miki
- Letterer: Rob Leigh
- Colorist: Brad Anderson

Hyde Street is an American horror comic book series written by Geoff Johns and illustrated by Ivan Reis. It is published by Image Comics through the creator-owned company Ghost Machine. The series began publication on October 2, 2024.

The series follows the supernatural location known as Hyde Street (based on the city of the same name in San Francisco), a cursed dimension that can appear in different towns and cities. The Residents of the street have been trapped there by the mysterious Scorekeeper and must deliver him 10,000 souls in order to be freed. Each issue explores the backstory of one of the Residents.

== Publication history ==
Hyde Street was launched as one of Ghost Machine's horror titles. The first issue was released by Image Comics on October 2, 2024. The main creative team consists of writer Geoff Johns, artist Ivan Reis, inker Danny Miki, colorist Brad Anderson, and letterer Rob Leigh.

The series was preceded by material in Ghost Machine #1, the company's introductory one-shot, and was followed by related titles including It Happened on Hyde Street: Devour and Sisterhood: A Hyde Street Story.

== Premise ==
The series is structured around Hyde Street, a mysterious and dangerous place where morally corrupt people may be trapped or punished. The stories use recurring supernatural hosts and residents, including Mr. X-Ray and Pranky, while individual issues focus on different characters and moral consequences.

== Characters ==
- The Scorekeeper, the enigmatic, godlike supreme ruler of Hyde Street who oversees the Residents with dark and absolute authority. Once every decade, he selects a morally corrupt individual who has been lured to the Street and offers them a contract: deliver him 10,000 souls and be set free with their deepest desires becoming a reality, or remain on Hyde Street forever.

=== Residents ===
- Mr. X-Ray (Frederick Xavier Ray), a manipulative salesman and former advertising executive who targeted children with his flashy novelty items as a way to drain their parent's wallets. When a young girl, Judy, arrived at his office one day claiming to be his daughter, he dismissed her but changed his mind after feeling a sense of guilt. Before he could find Judy, he was captured by Pranky and condemned to Hyde Street. Mr X-Ray became a Resident in 1966.
- Pranky (Philip "Pip" Peabody), a rage-filled and devious eleven year-old boy born into cruelty, hardship, and isolation. Hoping to find camaraderie, he joined a local Scout troop, only to be met with ridicule, leading his once playful pranks to escalate into acts of revenge. It is unknown how he became trapped on Hyde Street, but Pranky quickly became one of the most notorious Residents, preferring to target those who harm children, and easily surpassed the 10,000 soul prerequisite but refused to leave, much to the chagrin of the other Residents, whom he delights in outwitting by claiming souls before they can. Pranky became a Resident in 1955.
- Miss Goodbody (Glee Goodbody), when her father left during her childhood, Glee's mother became convinced it was due to her appearance and became obsessed with beauty and weight control, relentlessly scrutinising her daughter at every turn. Eventually becoming an aerobics teacher, Glee's own obsession with fitness metastasised, resulting in the death of one of her clients, who had a heart attack as Glee was berating her. Making a deal with Sister Hood, Glee poisoned the client's sister and sealed her fate, condemning her to Hyde Street, where she works at a health store promising deadly shortcuts to vulnerable people. Glee suffers from agoraphobia and has not left her store since arriving on the Street, terrified of the judgement of others. Miss Goodbody became a Resident in 1983.
- Doctor Ego (Eugene Ego), a gifted but reviled surgeon who became fascinated watching his father, an army medic dishonourably discharged following the Great War, secretly operate on desperate patients at his home in the dead of night. Despite being expelled from a prestigious medical school for excessive practices, Eugene built a successful Beverley Hills practice promising to "fix" the wealthy. When malpractice lawsuits threatened to strip away his license, Eugene accepted the Scorekeeper's bargain, which freed him of consequences and allowed him to continue operating at a surgery on Hyde Street. Doctor Ego became a Resident in 1997.
- Nurse Dee & Nurse Doe, beauty-obsessed patients of Doctor Ego who now work for him as his gossiping assistants. It is unknown how Ego managed to convince the Scorekeeper to spare them, but in doing so, he earned their eternal loyalty. Dee and Doe became Residents in 1998.
- Sister Hood (Clarissa Hood), a conwoman who offered fake seances, psychic readings, and opportunities for her grief-stricken targets to talk to the dead alongside her sister Lucinda. When recruited, the Scorekeeper offered the sisters a choice: one of them would collect souls while the other would be counted among them. Lucinda sacrificed herself and was transformed into a while dove, bound to Clarissa's side with the understanding that, once Clarissa delivers her 10,000th soul, she will die. Clarissa became one of Hyde Street's most efficient and Residents, though her pace has slowed as she nears her goal, with some theorising that she fears the cost of finishing. Sister Hood became a Resident in 1920.
- The Butcher of Hyde Street, a mysterious and violent serial killer who hunts his fellow Residents instead of the living, and is gifted with the ability to permanently destroy them. He was imprisoned by Sister Hood, The Matinee Monster, The Demon Within, and Nanny Nursey in 1953. The Butcher became a Resident in 1906.
- The Demon Within (General Arthur Whitlock), a once-decorated general in the British army celebrated for his discipline, intelligence, and calmness under fire. After leaving service, Whitlock became an author whose novels were grim accounts of war and guilt. When he found his way to Hyde Street, a demon unsuccessfully attempted to possess him, with Whitlock bending the fiend to his will and gaining the ability to draw upon its power at will. Preferring to keep to himself, Whitlock writes of every soul he delivers, treating them with a respect that is not shared by the other Residents of the Street. The Demon Within became a Resident in 1888.
- The Matinee Monster (Oscar Oddman), a wannabe actor who arrived in Hollywood in his early twenties but was confined to minor roles due to his towering and imposing build. When he landed a role in a monster movie, he felt his luck was changing, but became paranoid when the director brought in an established, well-known veteran performer and inadvertently killed him. Though he was able to hide his guilt from the public, he was ultimately drawn to Hyde Street, where he made a deal with the Scorekeeper to deliver 10,000 souls in exchange for the fame and fortune he long craved. When he attempted to kill his first victim, Oscar was moved by her innocence and refused to deliver her, enraging the Scorekeeper, who blinded him and ripped out his tongue as punishment. Now a pariah on the Street, Oscar continues to defy the Scorekeeper, rescuing victims where he can, much to the ire of the other Residents. The Matinee Monster became a Resident in 1949.

== List of works ==
=== Ongoing series ===
Title	Issues	Writer(s)	Artist(s)	Colourist(s)	Debut date	Finale date
Hyde Street	#1–	Geoff Johns	Ivan Reis	Brad Anderson	October 2, 2024	Present

=== Limited series ===
Title	Issues	Writer(s)	Artist(s)	Colourist(s)	Debut date	Finale date
Sisterhood: A Hyde Street Story	5	Maytal Zchut	Leila Leiz	Alex Sinclair	July 2, 2025	December 24, 2025
The Soulless: A Hyde Street Story	TBA	Lamont Magee	Francis Portela	Brad Anderson	TBA 2026	TBA

=== One-shots ===
Title	Writer(s)	Artist(s)	Colourist(s)	Debut date
Ghost Machine	Geoff Johns, Lamont Magee, Peter Tomasi and Maytal Zchut	Gary Frank, Bryan Hitch, Jason Fabok, Francis Manapul, Peter Snejbjerg and Ivan Reis	Brad Anderson, Francis Manapul and Bjarne Hansen	January 24, 2024
It Happened on Hyde Street: Devour	Maytal Zchut	Leila Leiz	Alex Sinclair	October 30, 2024

=== Tie-in material ===
- Ghost Machine. The Official Guidebook #5

== Reception ==
Mariano Abrach of Zona Negativa described Hyde Street as a horror anthology with a connecting setting and compared its structure to works such as Tales from the Crypt and The Twilight Zone. Reviewing Hyde Street #5 for AIPT, Crooker praised the issue's focus on Miss Goodbody and described it as a critique of 1980s diet culture.

== Collected editions ==
Vol.	Title	Material collected	Publication date	ISBN
1	Keeping Score	Hyde Street #1–7	October 1, 2025	ISBN 9781534335363
2	Volume 2	Hyde Street #8–13	July 29, 2026	ISBN 9781534333628
	Sisterhood: A Hyde Street Story	Sisterhood: A Hyde Street Story #1–5; It Happened on Hyde Street: Devour	April 22, 2026	ISBN 9781534335363
