= The Unbelievables =

The Unbelievables may refer to:

- D'Unbelievables, Irish comedy duo
- The Unbelievables (comics), American comic series
