= Keith Champagne =

American comic artist

- Born: August 4, 1970 (age 56) Providence, Rhode Island
- Areas: Writer, Artist, Inker

Keith Champagne (born August 4, 1970) is an American comic artist, who has also moved into writing, and is known for his work at DC Comics.

== Biography ==
Champagne graduated from Montville High School in Oakdale, Connecticut in 1988, and from the Kubert School in 1994. Champagne began working professionally as a comic book inker during his second year at the Kubert School.

Titles he has contributed to (as writer) include: JSA, Green Lantern Corps, and World War III. As an artist/inker, his work has appeared in many titles, most notably JSA, Firestorm, and Superboy.

Champagne also wrote Adolescent Radioactive Black Belt Hamsters, when the license was acquired by Dynamite Entertainment. His other work includes Ghostbusters for IDW Publishing and The Mighty, a creator-owned title for DC Comics, co-written with Peter Tomasi.

Champagne currently lives in Mansfield Center, Connecticut.

== Bibliography ==
Comics work includes:

- Aztek (pencils (1) and inks (2-10), with authors Grant Morrison/Mark Millar, DC Comics, 1996, tpb, collects Aztek, the Ultimate Man #1-10, 240 pages, April 30, 2008, ISBN 1-4012-1688-9)
- World War III #1-2 (script, with pencils by Pat Olliffe and inks by Drew Geraci, 4-issue mini-series, DC Comics, 2007)
- Countdown: Arena (script, with art by Scott McDaniel, 4-issue mini-series, DC Comics, December 2007)
- Adolescent Radioactive Black Belt Hamsters (script, with Tom Nguyen, 4-issue mini-series, Dynamite Entertainment, January 2008)
- Ghostbusters (script, with art by Tom Nguyen, IDW Publishing)
- The Mighty (with co-author Peter Tomasi and art by Peter Snejbjerg, 12-issue limited series, DC Comics)
- WWE Heroes, 7 issue series, Titan Publishing
- Stranger Things (all published by Dark Horse)
  - Stranger Things (a.k.a. Stranger Things: The Other Side) (inks, with author Jody Houser and penciler Stefano Martino; 4-issue miniseries, 2018-2019)
  - Stranger Things: Six (inks, with author Jody Houser and penciler Stefano Martino; 4-issue miniseries, 2019)
  - Stranger Things: Science Camp (inks, with author Jody Houser and penciler Edgar Salazar; 4-issue miniseries, 2020)
  - Stranger Things Summer Special (script, with artist Caio Filipe; one-shot; 2022)
