= The Necromancer (comics) =

Comic book limited series

Publication information
- Publisher: Top Cow
- Format: Limited series
- Genre: Horror
- Publication date: September 2005 – July 2006
- No. of issues: 6
- Main character: Abigail van Alstine

Creative team
- Written by: Joshua Ortega
- Artist: Jonboy Meyers (Pilot Season)
- Penciller: Francis Manapul
- Inker(s): Rick Basaldua; Kevin Conrad; Rob Hunter; Scott Koblish; Jay Leisten
- Letterer: Troy Peteri
- Colorist: Brian Buccelato

Collected editions
- The Necromancer: ISBN 1-58240-648-0

The Necromancer is a comic book published by the Top Cow imprint of Image Comics.

The comic was written by science fiction author and comic writer Joshua Ortega, with art on the first series by Francis Manapul.

== Publication history ==
Necromancer was originally announced back in 2001 with Top Cow president Matt Hawkins as the writer and Brian Ching on art chores.

Necromancer returned in the 2007 "Pilot Season" program from Top Cow. Ortega provided the script and Jonboy Meyers took over on art, as Manapul was on exclusive contract to DC.

== Plot ==
The series follows Abby van Alstine, a teenage girl who discovers that she is part of a mystical subculture among society, possessing several growing powers of her own.

== Collected editions ==
The first series was collected into a trade paperback in April 2007 (ISBN 1582406480).
