= WWE Magazine =

Former professional wrestling magazine

- Founded: 1983
- Final issue: October 2014 (though the special edition issues are still being published)
- Company: WWE
- Country: US
- Based in: Stamford, Connecticut
- Language: English

WWE Magazine was the official professional wrestling magazine of WWE. This incarnation of the magazine contains lifestyle sections, a monthly calendar, entertainment, work out tips, and other information. It was announced in July 2014 that after thirty years, the magazine would cease production, although special issues would continue to be published.

== History ==
WWE Magazine has gone through many incarnations throughout the years. It was originally known as WWF Victory Magazine from its debut issue in 1983 through the third issue of publication.

Starting with the third issue (April – May 1984) it became known as World Wrestling Federation Magazine (or WWF Magazine for short), with newly crowned WWF World Heavyweight Champion Hulk Hogan on the cover.

WWF Magazine would continue to be bi-monthly until June 1987, in which it would become a monthly operation and a staple of the WWF for the next decade. For several years, WWF Magazine operated as a kayfabe magazine; stories included biographies of wrestlers and feuds, as well as previews of upcoming events, editorials, and other features targeted at younger audiences; excerpts from letters to the editor, mainly from fans commenting on the wrestlers and angles, were also published.

In the early 1990s, the World Wide Fund for Nature (also WWF) gained an injunction against the distributor of WWF Magazine in Switzerland due to disputes regarding the WWF trademark in their home country.

In April 1996, the WWF decided to create a second magazine called Raw Magazine, which became a focus on behind the scenes activity, focusing on wrestlers real life profiles. It debuted with the May/June 1996 issue, and was bi-monthly until the January 1998 issue.

In May 2002, the World Wrestling Federation became known as World Wrestling Entertainment (WWE), and therefore the magazine was changed accordingly to WWE Magazine starting with the June 2002 issue.

In 2006, the magazine changed by moving away from being solely a wrestling magazine. Instead the majority of the magazine contained lifestyle tips, product reviews and photos of WWE's superstars and divas outside the ring. The new style was similar to current men's magazines, such as Maxim and Stuff.

On July 31, 2014, it was announced that WWE Magazine would cease production due to budget cuts as well as a decline in circulation. The last issue (October 2014) would be available on September 16, 2014. The final edition of WWE Magazine featured Seth Rollins, Roman Reigns and Dean Ambrose on the cover, former members of The Shield.

== Breaking kayfabe ==
The magazine generally upheld kayfabe but would sometimes refer to news and topics outside WWE programming. Notable examples were the 1990 parasailing accident that injured Brutus "the Barber" Beefcake (at the time, one of the WWF's biggest stars), and the 1992 divorce of Randy Savage and Miss Elizabeth. In neither case did the magazine actually "break" kayfabe, but it was notable to see glimpses of the wrestlers' lives outside of wrestling.

In the September 1993 issue, the magazine was to introduce a semi-regular feature titled "Now It's Our Turn", which was to present the WWF's official (non-kayfabe) explanations/defenses against accusations from former wrestlers and employees. Although one lengthy column focusing on Superstar Billy Graham was published, the feature did not appear again.

== WWE Kids Magazine ==
WWE Kids Magazine was launched in April 2008 (US) / October 2008 (UK) as a monthly magazine aimed at children aged 6–14. It stopped being published in the United States in September 2014, but continued in the United Kingdom under a licensing agreement until December 2023.

== See also ==
- WWE Heroes
