= WWE Heroes =

Publication information
- Publisher: Titan Magazines
- Schedule: Monthly
- Publication date: April – December 2010
- No. of issues: 8

Creative team
- Written by: Keith Champagne
- Artist(s): Andy Smith; Tom Nguyen
- Letterer(s): Comicraft
- Colorist(s): Hi Fi Color Design

WWE Heroes is an American celebrity comics comic book series, published by Titan Magazines. The series is written by Keith Champagne and the artwork is composed by Andy Smith. It stars WWE's most popular wrestlers, such as John Cena, The Undertaker, Randy Orton, Batista and Triple H.

The first issue was released in April 2010 with a continual storyline called Rise of the Firstborn. A different but similar story continues in the Undertaker's 2-part issue.

== Overview ==
#	Title	Writer(s)	Artist(s)	Release Date
1	"Rise of the Firstborn: Part 1"	Keith Champagne	Andy Smith	23 March 2010
2	"Rise of the Firstborn: Part 2"	Keith Champagne	Andy Smith	27 April 2010
3	"Rise of the Firstborn: Part 3"	Keith Champagne	Andy Smith	25 May 2010
4	"Rise of the Firstborn: Part 4"	Keith Champagne	Andy Smith	29 June 2010
5	"Rise of the Firstborn: Part 5"	Keith Champagne	Andy Smith	27 July 2010
6	"Rise of the Firstborn: Part 6"	Keith Champagne	Andy Smith	24 August 2010
7	"Timequake - Undertaker: Part 1"	Keith Champagne	Tom Nguyen	24 November 2010
8	"Timequake - Undertaker: Part 2"	Keith Champagne	Tom Nguyen	29 December 2010

== See also ==
- List of wrestling-based comic books
- WWE Books
- WWE Magazine
