= Joshua Ortega =

American author and journalist (born 1974)

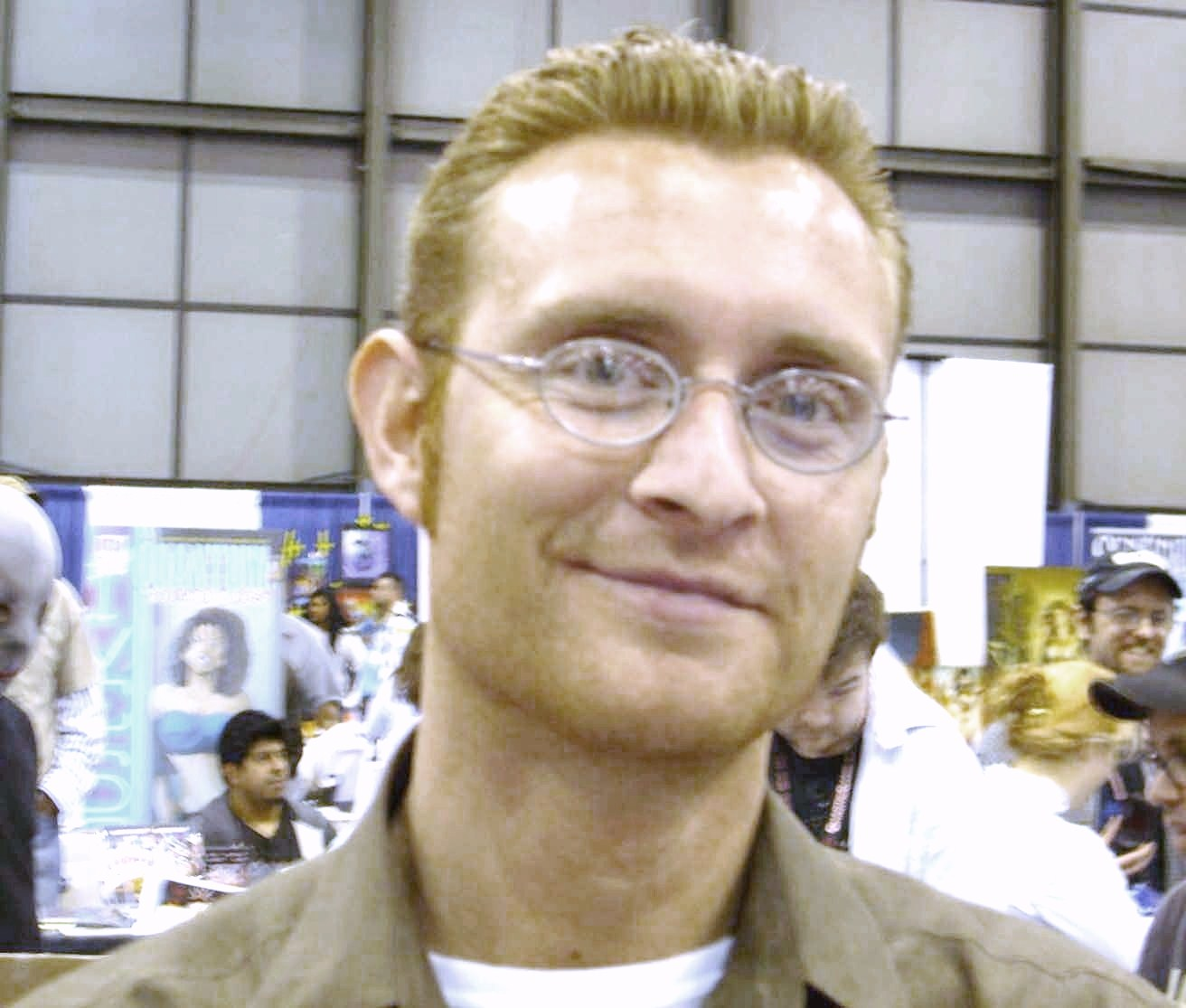
- Joshua Ortega at the April 2008 New York Comic Con.
- Born: 1974 (age 51–52)
- Areas: Writer, novelist
- Notable works: Frequencies, Star Wars, Spider-Man, Batman, Star Trek

Joshua Ortega (born 1974) is an American author and journalist best known for his novel Frequencies, as well as his comic book and graphic novel work on entertainment properties such as Star Wars, Spider-Man, Batman, Star Trek, The Escapist, and The Necromancer.

== Career ==
=== Journalism and poetry ===
Joshua Ortega began his writing career at the University of Washington in Seattle, Washington, working as a reporter and a reviewer for the school's newspaper, The Daily of the University of Washington, covering the booming Seattle music and arts scene of the 1990s.

After college, he worked for the Los Angeles-based USB magazine and The Flavor, a Seattle-based hip-hop magazine. During this time, he not only continued to cover the music and entertainment beat, but also began to write about technology's effects on culture and politics. He soon developed a reputation as an expert in the fields of emerging technology and surveillance issues, and would later contribute feature-length articles for newspapers such as The Seattle Times.

While working as a journalist, one of Ortega's poems, "A Place at the Table", was selected as the lead poem for a poetry anthology, A Place at the Table, which was juried by the publishers of Blue Begonia Press and the Raven Chronicles, and edited by award-winning poet Jody Aliesan. During this time, he also worked for Microsoft, providing original content for a number of the company's online video games.

=== Novels ===
In 1998, Ortega founded his own publishing and entertainment company, Omega Point Productions, and in August 1999, the company published the first edition of his debut novel Frequencies. After two years and multiple printings, the rights to Frequencies were bought by the Jodere Group, publishers of such New York Times Bestsellers as Crossing Over by John Edward and The Power of Kaballah by Yehuda Berg.

Ortega is currently working on the sequel to Frequencies, ~VIBRATIONS~, in addition to another novel, an original screenplay, and numerous comic book and graphic novel projects. He often gives talks to aspiring writers of speculative fiction in the Seattle area.

=== Comics ===
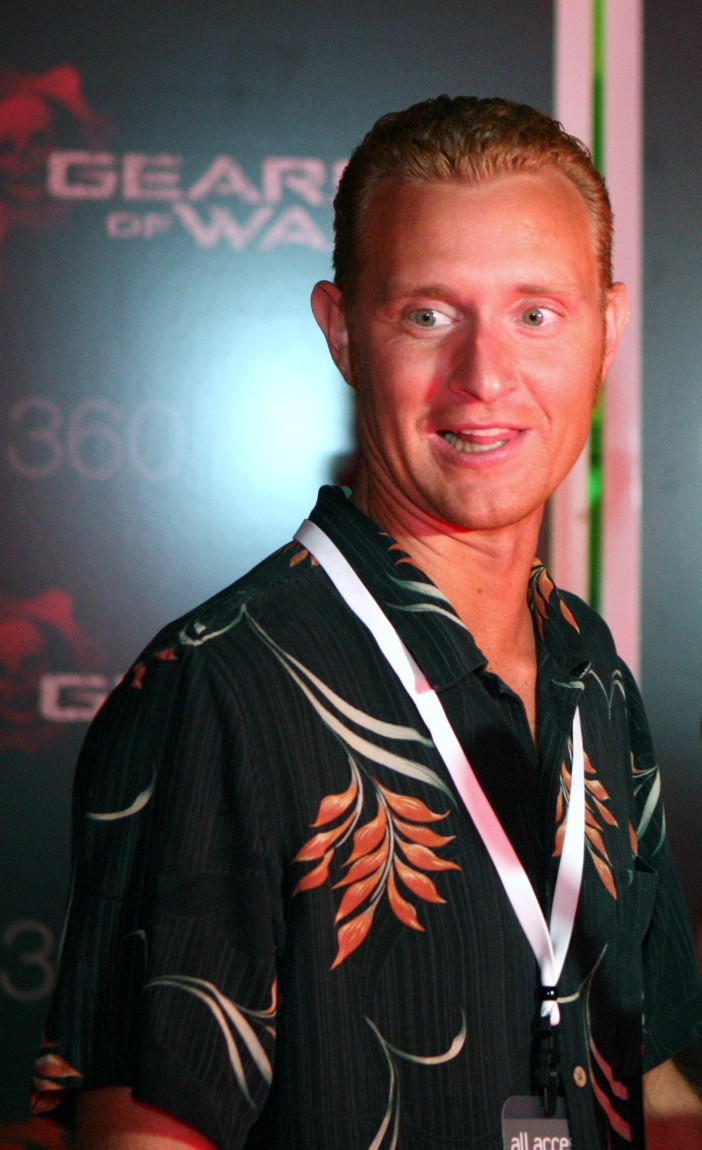
Joshua Ortega at the 2008 Electronic Entertainment Expo

The hardcover edition of Frequencies was released in March 2003, and was promoted with a national book tour that took Ortega to over forty cities during the year. The tour itself became news, since a book tour of this magnitude was unheard of for a first-time author, and Ortega made multiple appearances on major media outlets such as NPR, Fox TV, and Coast to Coast AM.

In 2004, Ortega began negotiations with numerous comic book and graphic novel publishers, and in March 2005, his first comic book story was released: Spider-Man Unlimited No. 8, published by Marvel Comics. The story was entitled "Everything" and featured Ryan Sook on pencils. His next story, “Shadows & Light,” was released by Dark Horse Comics in April 2005 in Star Wars Tales #23. “Shadows & Light” served as a prequel to the bestselling Knights of the Old Republic video games for the Xbox and PC, and featured Dustin Weaver on pencils.

Since then, Ortega has written for several major American comic book publishers, including Marvel Comics, DC Comics, Dark Horse Comics, TOKYOPOP, Image Comics, Top Cow Productions, and Speakeasy Comics, working on characters and properties such as Star Wars, Batman, Spider-Man, Star Trek, Michael Chabon’s The Escapist, Beowulf, and his own co-creation, The Necromancer, penciled and co-created by Francis Manapul.

=== Video games ===
Joshua is also being credited as a writer for Epic Games' Gears of War 2 as well scripting the Gears of War comic books.

== Bibliography ==
=== Novels ===
- Frequencies, Jodere Group (March 2003). ISBN 1-58872-069-1.

=== Comics ===
- Gears of War (with Liam Sharp, Wildstorm, December 2008 – August 2012)
