= Ghost Machine (company) =

American comic book publisher

- Creators you know. Characters you'll love.
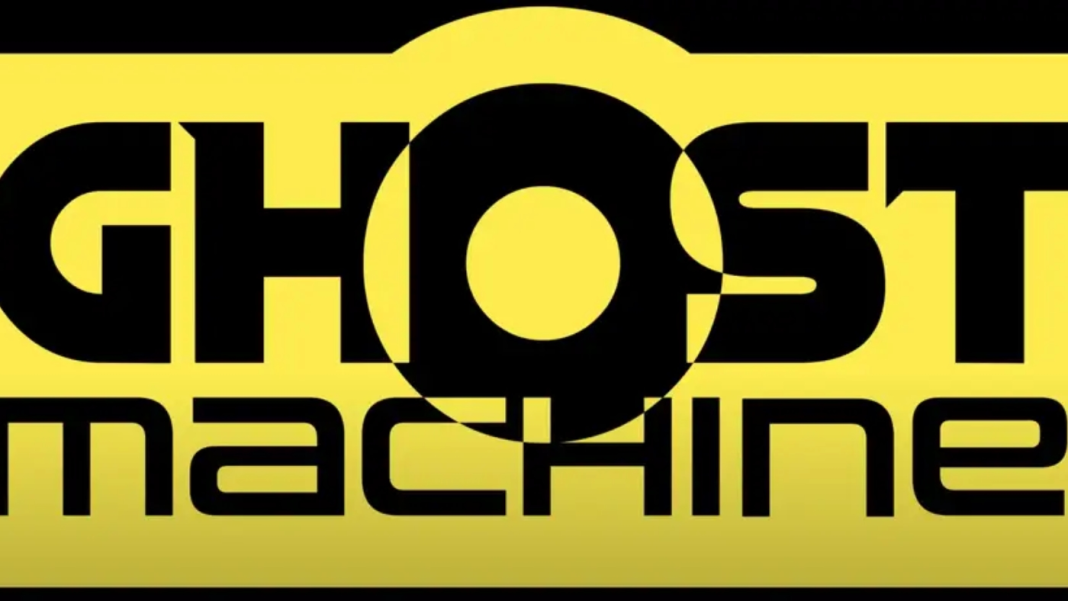
- Status: Active
- Founded: October 12, 2023; 3 years ago
- Country of origin: United States
- Distribution: Image Comics
- Key people: Brad Meltzer, Geoff Johns, Bryan Hitch, Gary Frank, Francis Manapul, Peter Tomasi, Jason Fabok, Ivan Reis, Lamont Magee, Maytal Zchut, Brad Anderson, Rob Leigh
- Publication types: science fiction historical fantasy post-apocalyptic fiction horror
- Fiction genres: Time travel fiction; Post-apocalyptic fiction; Historical fantasy; War; Horror
- Official website: Official website

Ghost Machine (founded and previously known as Mad Ghost Productions) is an American cooperative media company founded in October 2023, which publishes creator-owned comics through Image Comics, and was founded to help the participating creators to benefit from the development of its intellectual properties. The company was announced on October 12, 2023 at the New York Comic Con. Its founding writers and artists, who are exclusive to the company, are Brad Meltzer, Jason Fabok, Gary Frank, Bryan Hitch, Geoff Johns, Francis Manapul, Peter J. Tomasi, Lamont Magee, Maytal Zchut, Brad Anderson and Rob Leigh.

At its launch, the creators stressed that unlike the work they had done in the past for publishers such as DC Comics, the books of the four shared universes established by the company's first official release in January 2024, Ghost Machine #1, would not be set in the superhero genre, but in other genres such as science fiction, historical fantasy, post-apocalyptic fiction, and horror.

== History ==
The launch of Ghost Machine was announced on October 12, 2023 at the New York Comic Con. It was touted as a cooperative media company that would publish creator-owned comics through Image Comics. The company made the announcement at the convention's the Lunar Distribution retailer breakfast, with its first convention panel held on October 13, and produced a Ghost Machine #1 ashcan comic, as a giveway to visitors to the company's booth.

The company's founding writers and artists are: Brad Meltzer, Jason Fabok, Gary Frank, Bryan Hitch, Geoff Johns, Lamont Magee, Francis Manapul, Peter J. Tomasi, Maytal Zchut and Brad Anderson. It was also indicated that other creators would be joining the company after they completed their prior commitments to other publishers. Ghost Machine was conceived with the idea that its founding creators would be exclusive to the company and would jointly own, operate, and profit from their creations. The group ownership of the imprint's properties is reflected in the editorial page of its inaugural publication, Ghost Machine #1, under the headline "Welcome to the First Fully Shared Creator-Owned Universes!" In the accompanying text, the creators state, "We completely co-own our company, characters, and universes together, sharing in publishing, but also in media, merchandise, and beyond." Novelist/television writer Brad Meltzer explained the rationale for the company, pointing to how in the American comics history, historically, writers and artists were not able to control or earn considerable profit from creations that went on to become highly lucrative for publishers, like Superman, saying, "The entertainment industry is an ecosystem, and it is ever changing... When you tell the stories of comics themselves, the creator doesn't always come first."

Pointing to the 2023 Writer's Guild and SAG-AFTRA strikes (the latter of which was still ongoing at the time of Ghost Machine's launch), the company further explained in a press release:

"As the recent Hollywood strikes have shown, creatives are disenfranchised with the traditional industry model – creators seek increased empowerment as a natural progression to an ever-changing entertainment landscape. Ghost Machine's enterprising business model is at the forefront of this evolution with the characters and full company ownership shared by its creators in every way."

"Our ambition for Ghost Machine is to push beyond superheroes, introducing new genres, characters and shared universes, completely co-owned by all the creators involved. We see this as the future of how creatives will work and retain creative control and meaningfully participate in success like never before. Our passion is for the magic of graphic storytelling and the emotional resonance of compelling characters. But we are not just a comic book company – we are the first wholly creator-owned and operated media company of its kind, born out of a desire to create and succeed together."

This was interpreted by Russ Burlingame of ComicBook.com to mean that Ghost Machine would not restrict itself to publishing screen-friendly intellectual properties but would be a media company that would facilitate the development of those properties into media adaptations, and Burlingame noted that several of the company's founding creators had experience producing work for film and television. It was not clear, however, whether all the founders would have an equal stake in all the properties or if each individual creator owned their individual properties, which had been the standard arrangement at Image Comics since its founding.

The company's founders stressed that they would be creating stories set in genres outside the superhero genre in which many of them had already done work, with Johns saying, "We want to create beyond superheroes." Echoing this, Hitch said of the stories, "Heroes yes. Capes no." The company's launch schedule was to commence with Geiger: Ground Zero, a two-issue series by Johns and Frank released in November 2023 that serves as a prequel to their 2021 miniseries of the same name. This would be followed in January 2024 with the company's first "official" release, Ghost Machine #1, a 64-page special, and then that April with a series of books that would comprise "four shared universes of character-centered titles." The Unnamed, whose first ongoing titles would be Geiger and Redcoat; Rook: Exodus, a sprawling science fiction epic set in the future; Family Odysseys, which centers upon a family of time travelers.

At its launch the company also stated that its slate of books would include an as-yet untitled horror-based universe co-created by what the company indicated at its launch was a prominent artist still under contract with another publisher, and whose identity would be announced at a later date. Bleeding Cool reported that the name of that series was The Soulless, but on December 1, 2023, the company announced that the unnamed creator was Brazilian artist Ivan Reis, and that the universe was Hyde Street, which would also be the eponymous title of that universe's central series, which Reis would illustrate with Johns as writer.

On December 6, 2023, media sources reported that Danish artist Peter Snejbjerg would be joining Ghost Machine in an exclusive capacity, as its eleventh creator. Snejbjerg's first work is the book Hornsby and Halo, in collaboration with Tomasi as writer, with whom Snejbjerg previously collaborated on the supernatural DC Comics series The Light Brigade. Hornsby and Halo centers upon a pair of teenagers, one a demon, and the other an angel, who endeavor to maintain the cosmic peace between Heaven and Hell. An installment of the series appears in Ghost Machine #1.

On the aforementioned editorial page of Ghost Machine #1, The company stated that these initial creators represented the imprint's "first wave" of writers and artists. In May 2024, it was announced that colorist Brad Anderson and letterer Rob Leigh had signed exclusivity deals with Ghost Machinewhich included status as equity co-owners of the intellectually properties published by the group, which according to Bleeding Cool, was an unprecedented for a colorist and letterer.

=== Publishing model ===
Ghost Machine operates through a cooperative creator-owned structure in which participating creators share ownership of the company and its publishing universes. Industry commentators compared the model to early creator-owned initiatives associated with Image Comics, while noting Ghost Machine's emphasis on collective ownership rather than individually controlled studios.

=== Fictional universes ===
Intellectual property	Debut year	Creator(s)	Debut issue
The Unnamed	2021	Geoff Johns, Gary Frank, Brad Anderson, Bryan Hitch, Andrew Currie and Andrea Mutti	Geiger (vol. 1) #1
Rook	2024	Geoff Johns, Jason Fabok and Brad Anderson	Ghost Machine #1
The Unbelievables	2024	Peter Tomasi, Francis Manapul, John Kalisz and Peter Snejbjerg	Ghost Machine #1
Hyde Street	2024	Geoff Johns, Ivan Reis, Brad Anderson, Maytal Zchut, Leila Leiz and Alex Sinclair	Ghost Machine #1

== List of publications ==
=== 2021 ===
- Geiger (vol. 1) #1–6

=== 2022 ===
- Geiger 80-Page Giant #1
- Junkyard Joe #1–6

=== 2023 ===
- Geiger: Ground Zero #1–2

=== 2024 ===
- Geiger (vol. 2) #1–
- Ghost Machine #1
- Hornsby & Halo #1–
- Hyde Street #1–
- It Happened on Hyde Street: Devour #1
- Redcoat #1–
- The Rocketfellers #1–
- Rook: Exodus #1–
- Tales of the Unnamed: The Blizzard

=== 2025 ===
- Sisterhood: A Hyde Street Story #1–5

=== 2026 ===
- Ghost Machine 2026 Ashcan #1
- Ghost Machine: The Official Guidebook #1–5
- Hornsby & Halo #0
- The Rocketfellers #0
- The Trillion Dollar Kid #1–2

=== Upcoming ===
- First Ghost #1–
- Jean Genie #1–
- Radioactive Revolution #1
- Rook: Wardens – Dire Wolf #1
- The Soulless: A Hyde Street Story #1–

== Events and crossovers ==
Part	Issue	Release date
Who Are the Unbelievables?
1	The Rocketfellers #0	May 20, 2026
2	Hornsby & Halo #0	May 27, 2026
3	The Trillion Dollar Kid #1	May 17, 2026
4	Hornsby & Halo #14	June 24, 2026
5	The Rocketfellers #13	July 15, 2026
6	The Trillion Dollar Kid #2	August 12, 2026
Radioactive Revolution
1	Geiger (vol. 2) #25	September 9, 2026
2	Radioactive Revolution #1	February 10, 2027
3	Geiger (vol. 2) #26	March 2027
4	Redcoat #23	March 2027
5	Geiger (vol. 2) #27	April 2027
6	Redcoat #24	April 2027
7	Geiger (vol. 2) #28	May 2027
