= Gary Frank =

Gary Frank may refer to:

- Gary Frank (actor) (born 1950), American actor
- Gary Frank (artist) (born 1969), British comics artist
