= The Mighty (comics) =

Superhero comic book

The Mighty is a superhero comic book published by DC Comics. It was written by Peter Tomasi, Keith Champagne, and Chris Samee. The series follows a special task force that aids in the efforts of the world's sole superhuman, an individual known as Alpha One. The series ran for twelve issues and was republished with a new cover by Dave Johnson (comics).
