= Bryan Hitch =

British comics artist and writer (born 1970)

- Born: 22 April 1970 (age 56) Carlisle, England
- Areas: Writer, Penciller, Artist, Inker
- Notable works: Action Force; Death's Head; The Authority; Captain America: Reborn; The Ultimates; The Ultimates 2 JLA; Justice League: Rebirth; Ultimate Invasion
- Awards: National Comics Award for Best Artist in Comics Now (2003)

Bryan Hitch (born 22 April 1970) is a British comics artist and writer. Hitch began his career in the United Kingdom for Marvel UK, working on titles such as Action Force and Death's Head, before gaining prominence on American titles such as Wildstorm's Stormwatch and The Authority, DC Comics' JLA, and Marvel Comics' The Ultimates.

Hitch's artwork and designs have appeared in direct-to-video animated films, television, and major feature films, such as the 2009 film Star Trek, for which he has been praised by director J. J. Abrams.

== Early life ==
Bryan Hitch was born 22 April 1970 in what he described as "in the far northern reaches of England." He began reading comics at an early age, likening them to his "underage drug habit" and the newsagent in northern England where he would buy his books from his "dealer". The newsagent was next door to a cinema, and as Hitch explains, he could go straight from enjoying Christopher Reeve Superman films and other genre films to the store to buy Superman comics drawn by artists such as Curt Swan and José Luis García-López.

Hitch spent much time as a child drawing, which included and copying the art from comics. Although he had envisioned drawing them as a career, he would eventually find himself in seminary, studying to be a priest. When he realized he needed to leave that institution, relating during an interview at the 2008 New York Comic Con, "Apart from wanting to do comics, I also have a fundamental lack of belief in God."

== Career ==
=== 1980s — 1990s ===
Hitch entered the comics industry after submitting "Teeth Like Flint", an Action Force sample story he wrote and drew to Marvel UK, using a style that was fashionable at the time, which resembled that of another Marvel UK artist, Alan Davis. Marvel UK gave him his first professional commission in May or June 1987, approximately a month and a half after his 17th birthday, which was for that very title. Deriding his skills from his early career, Hitch remarked in 2008, "Why they hired me, I have no idea. I assume they were drunk."

Hitch worked with Simon Furman on Transformers and Death's Head. He did some work at Marvel Comics and DC Comics during the late 1980s and early 1990s, in particular his run on The Sensational She-Hulk, and continued drawing for Marvel UK. After that imprint closed, he provided the art for an issue of Teen Titans and a couple of series at Valiant Comics before returning to Marvel where he would work with inker Paul Neary. By the late 1990s that Hitch's pencils were inked primarily by Neary.

Hitch had resolved to leave comics in order to pursue film and commercial work, and when he accepted the assignment of drawing Stormwatch (Vol 2) for Wildstorm, he initially did so specifically to bankroll his transition to a different industry. However, this changed when he met writer Warren Ellis, whose collaboration skills so spurred Hitch's excitement on the book that the artist would later describe his change in attitude as "like a lighting bolt." Hitch would draw issues 3 - 8 and the final two issues, 10 and 11. His work on Stormwatch garnered him greater visibility, and offers from other companies. He remained with Ellis to draw the Stormwatch spinoff book, The Authority, on which Hitch's trademark high level of detail and use of "widescreen" page layouts helped make the book extremely popular, and proved to be highly influential on industry art styles.

This led to a year on JLA with Mark Waid which included the JLA: Heaven's Ladder tabloid format one-shot. The run was marred by fill-in artists, and in Hitch's view, by the fact that he and writer Mark Waid did not enjoy the same compatibility as he and Ellis did.

=== 2000s ===
Amid his disappointment with his Justice League work, Hitch was offered work by CrossGen Comics, but a phone call by Marvel Comics editor in chief Joe Quesada paved the way for his next high-profile assignment, returning to Marvel with Neary, and joining Mark Millar on The Ultimates, a 13-issue maxiseries that debuted in early 2002. It was characterized by naturalistic visuals and a cinematic tone that greatly influenced the Marvel Cinematic Universe, and garnered critical acclaim. By September 2003, Marvel had renewed Hitch's exclusivity contract through 2006. Millar and Hitch continued their collaboration on the sequel series, The Ultimates 2, which premiered in December 2004, and on a 15-issue Fantastic Four run that began in 2009.

By this time Hitch had developed a reputation for slow work and lateness, which began with his work on Ultimates, and continued with his Justice League work. Although Millar and Quesada said that the book's tardiness was due to the high level of detail in Hitch's art, Hitch, who acknowledged in a 2008 interview that he was working to repair his reputation in this regard, explained that the long delays in between issues of The Ultimates, was due to the birth of his child, two house moves, and an office move, though Hitch also conceded that the page count of his art exceeded what was indicated in Millar's scripts, saying, "Mark would write a twenty two page comic and I would take it to thirty eight pages." So burnt out did Hitch feel after the "hard slog" of The Ultimates that it took a considerable effort on Millar's part to convince him to return for the sequel. In the case of Heaven's Ladder, however, DC Comics, which was less supportive of his tardiness than Marvel, scheduled the book according to the day he signed the contract for it, and began advertising it when he still had four or five more issues of The Authority to do. Hitch related:

"I pointed this out, and they said, 'Oh, don’t worry, we'll correct it in-house and adjust the later delivery dates and the ship dates’, but they didn’t do that! So suddenly this book was five months late when I started it, and they’d already started advertising the book and soliciting it. And this was only half of the bad experience. It was 72 pages of artwork which was 50% more work than normal since you drew the pages bigger – which inevitably DC didn’t pay us for: they paid us normal rates. Paul and I lost money doing it; we practically went bankrupt, because we were trying to do this good job and use the space on the pages better since they could be done larger. Otherwise, we could have just done a normal comic book: What was the point of the extra format?"

Hitch found his work drawing Millar's run on Fantastic Four, to be a better experience. He made a point of drawing on illustration board roughly twice the size of the Marvel standard, which allowed him to complete the artwork faster. Hitch provided cover artwork for the November 2006 issue of the British film magazine Empire, for a cover feature on comic book movies. He was a character design artist for the Ultimate Avengers and Ultimate Avengers 2 animated films. He was a character design artist for the video game Incredible Hulk: Ultimate Destruction. He was brought aboard the project due to his rendition of the Hulk in The Ultimates. He was hired by the BBC as the concept artist for the 2005 relaunch of the Doctor Who television series, providing input into the design of the TARDIS interior set. Hitch contributed designs to the starship piloted by Spock in the 2009 feature film Star Trek, for which director J. J. Abrams has praised him.

Hitch's cover to Fantastic Four #554 (April 2008) is featured in the opening title sequence of the 2010 History Channel television series, Stan Lee's Superhumans. That same year, Impact Books published Bryan Hitch's Ultimate Comics Studio, examination of Hitch's approach and techniques toward his craft, as well as practical tips provided by Hitch on various aspects of the visual storytelling process, and how to develop a career in the comics field. Studio, which features a foreword by Joss Whedon, contains both past artworks of Hitch's, as well as original artwork produced specifically for the book.

=== 2010s — present ===
By the end of 2011, Hitch's exclusivity contract with Marvel expired. In 2012, Hitch was one of several artists to illustrate a variant cover for Robert Kirkman's The Walking Dead #100, which was released July 11 at San Diego Comic-Con. The following year, Hitch illustrated the Image Comics series America's Got Powers, with writer Jonathan Ross.

He illustrated six issues of the ten-issue miniseries Age of Ultron, which debuted in 2013. The following year Hitch and writer Brad Meltzer collaborated on a retelling of Batman's first appearance for Detective Comics vol. 2 #27.

March 2014 saw the debut of Hitch's creator-owned series, Real Heroes, which he wrote and illustrated. Hitch described the concept as "the cast of Avengers does Galaxy Quest."

In 2015, Hitch returned DC to write and draw Justice League of America, although DC canceled the last five issues it had solicited, ending Hitch's run with issue 38. He and artist Tony Daniel collaborated on a new Justice League series in 2016 as part of the DC Rebirth relaunch. Hitch finished his work on the series with issue #31 in October 2017. In 2018, he and writer Robert Venditti worked together on a Hawkman ongoing series.

Beginning in 2019, he partnered with Warren Ellis for a twelve-issue DC limited series The Batman's Grave. Hitch commented, "I've wanted to do a proper Batman book since childhood so all the tropes from Batmobile, Batcave, to Wayne Manor have been developing in my mind for decades. I've drawn Batman in Justice League which was nice but getting to fully play with his world has been as 'Batmanny' as I could have hoped for."

In 2021, Hitch became the monthly penciler on Marvel's Venom vol. 5, teaming him with writers Al Ewing and Ram V. In December 2022 it was reported that Hitch would be replaced as the interior artist by Carlos Alberto Fernandez Urbano (CAFU) with issue 17, though he would continue to draw the series' covers up to issue 25.

Hitch drew the 2023 miniseries Ultimate Invasion, with Jonathan Hickman writing and the premise revolving around The Maker attempting to bring back the Ultimate Universe, the aftermath of which will lead to a brand new line of Ultimate Marvel comics, which Hickman is helping to spearhead.

Hitch teamed with Mark Waid for a three issue miniseries for DC Black Label called Superman: The Last Days of Lex Luthor. The first issue was released in July 2023.

On October 12, 2023, Hitch and a group of colleagues announced at the New York Comic Con that they were forming a cooperative media company called Ghost Machine, which would publish creator-owned comics, and allow the participating creators to benefit from the development of their intellectual properties. The company publishes its books through Image Comics, and its other founding creators include Geoff Johns, Brad Meltzer, Jason Fabok, Gary Frank, Francis Manapul, and Peter J. Tomasi, all of whom would produce comics work exclusively through that company. In keeping with this exclusivity, Hitch affirmed that he would no longer work on any project on which he was not an owner or co-owner, and that Superman: The Last Days of Lex Luthor would be his final work for hire project, stating, "Since Superman was the character who first sparked my passion for comics and movies (and orchestral music), I can't think of anything more fitting that a truly brilliant Superman story is my last WFH project." Hitch's inaugural art for Ghost Machine was on Redcoat, a series written by Johns that centers upon a soldier named Simon Pure who, during the American Revolution, is forced to fight for Britain, and who inadvertently gains the power of immortality after stumbling upon the Founding Fathers' secret mystical organization. Described by Hitch as "a bit of a tool", Simon grows jaded over the decades, and becomes an irreverent mercenary who makes a living while fleeing from a litany of deadly enemies, ex-lovers, and bill collectors.

== Influence ==
Film director Josh Trank has described himself as a "huge fan" of Hitch's artwork, and was inspired by Hitch's depiction of Reed Richards working in his garage in The Ultimates to approach focus on Richards as a young man in the 2015 Fantastic Four film.

== Technique and materials ==
Hitch does not consider himself an artist or comic artist, but a storyteller, explaining that illustration for him is simply a medium to tell a story.

Hitch is particular about his studio workspace, which does not contain a TV or sofa, stating that such things belong in the lounge for relaxation. In addition to a large drawing board and extra desk space for his computer equipment and lightbox, he keeps copious book shelves. Despite using a professional drawing board, he emphasises that any inexpensive board large enough to hold the paper is sufficient, as he himself mostly uses a piece of roughly cut chip-board leaning on the edge of his desk. He uses an Apple iMac desktop computer, flatbed scanner and Photoshop to modify his artwork digitally.

Hitch begins with multiple rough sketches employing different camera angles on paper with a blue pencil, which tends to be less visible in photocopies or scans, and then select the desired elements from the rough sketch with a graphite pencil. After picking the initial shapes, he will further emphasise his selections with a red marker pen and other coloured pens, continuing to attempt different variations. He will then, depending on how late in the day it is, either redraw the illustration on a sheet of layout paper or use his lightbox to tighten and clean up the drawing, emphasising that the lightbox should not be a mere exercise in tracing, but an opportunity to refine or change elements in the drawing to make it "clean" enough to be inked. When Hitch transfers the drawing to the final art board, he does initial layouts with a 2H pencil, which feels provides the necessary accuracy and detail, and uses an erasable blue pencil to mark panel frames and vanishing points, which he introduces after the rough stage. He chooses not to put too much time or polish into this stage, preferring to work quickly, lightly and instinctively. He uses a mechanical pencil with 0.9mm 2H lead at this stage for fine outlines and detail work, and a traditional pencil for more organic work, including softer lines, shading large areas and creating more fluid motion. The "best tool of all", according to him, is a traditional pencil cut with a craft knife, which he says can produce a variety of marks, and be used for detail, shading and general sketching. Hitch believes the best results combine both the mechanical and the knife-sharpened traditional pencil.

Regarding inking, Hitch says, "Inking isn't about tracing, or taking someone else's pencil drawing and making it your own. It's about being aware of and respectful about the original artist's intentions. It's also about making your own artistic judgements based on your interpretation of the piece. The skill is then honing your technique to be able to actually deliver a strong, inked piece that is just how the artist wanted it to be." For feathering, Hitch uses a size 0 sable brush, which he says provide a wider range of sensitive marks than synthetic brushes, despite being softer and harder to use. For more free-hand hatching, Hitch uses a Gillott 1960 dip pen, though he prefers to use more solid areas of black to large amounts of rendering.

== Personal life ==
As of September 2003, Hitch, his fiancée Joanne, and their five children lived in England. At the time he stated in an interview that he and Joanne planned to marry when the time was right. As of 2014, the biographical blurb on his Twitter page indicated that he was married.

== Bibliography ==
=== Interior work ===
==== DC Comics ====
- Adventures of Superman Annual #3 (1991)
- The Batman's Grave #1-12 (2019–2020)
- Detective Comics vol. 2 #27 (2014)
- Exciting X-Patrol (Amalgam Comics) (1997)
- Green Lantern vol. 3 #1,000,000 (1998)
- Hawkman vol. 5 #1–12 (2018–2019)
- Hawkman: Found #1 (2018)
- JLA #47–50, 52–55, 57–58 (2000–2001)
- JLA: Heaven's Ladder (2000)
- Justice League vol. 3 #1–11, 14–21, 25–31 (writer; also artist on #14, 20–21; 2016–2017)
- Justice League: Rebirth #1 (writer/artist; 2016)
- Justice League of America, vol. 4, #1–4, 6–9 (writer/artist), #10 (writer only; 2015–2016)
- Martian Manhunter vol. 2 #11 (1999)
- Showcase '93 #4–5 (Geo-Force) (1993)
- Star Trek: The Next Generation: The Killing Shadows #1 (inker) (2000)
- Team Titans #21 (1994)
- Transmetropolitan #31 (2000)
- Young Monsters in Love #1 (Solomon Grundy) (2018)

==== Image Comics ====
- America's Got Powers #1–7 (2012–2013)
- Real Heroes #1-4 (2014)

==== WildStorm ====
- The Authority #1–12 (1999–2000)
- Gen-Active #1 (2000)
- Stormwatch (Vol. 2) #4–11 (1997–1998)
- Wildcats #5 (1999)

==== Impact Books ====
- Bryan Hitch's Ultimate Comics Studio (2010)

==== Marvel Comics ====
- Age of Ultron #1–5, 10 (2013)
- Alpha Flight vol. 2 #6 (1998)
- Avengers vol. 4 #12.1 (2011)
- Captain America: Reborn #1–6 (2009–2010)
- Captain Planet and the Planeteers #11–12 (1992)
- ClanDestine #11 (1995)
- Colossus #1 (1997)
- Excalibur #104–105 (1997)
- Fantastic Four #554–568 (2008–2009)
- Free Comic Book Day 2021: Spider-Man/Venom #1 (Venom's story) (2021)
- Gambit Giant-Size #1 (1998)
- Generation X #28 (1997)
- Marvel Comics Presents #76 (1991)
- New Avengers #50 (among other artists) (2009)
- New Avengers Finale (among other artists) (2010)
- Sensational She-Hulk #9–11, 13–20, 24–26 (1989–1991)
- Thing/She-Hulk: The Long Night one-shot (with Ivan Reis) (2002)
- Ultimate Fallout #2 (Thor) (2011)
- Ultimate Invasion #1–4 (2023)
- The Ultimates #1–13 (2002–2004)
- The Ultimates 2 #1–13 (2004–2007)
- Uncanny X-Men #323, 331 (1995–1996)
- Uncanny X-Men '95 #1 (1995)
- Venom (Vol. 5) #1-16 (2021–2023)
- What If? #59 (Wolverine) (1994)
- X-Factor #105, 118 (1994–1996)
- X-Men Prime #1 (among other artists) (1995)
- X-Men vs. Brood: Day of Wrath #1–2 (1997)

===== Marvel UK =====
- Hell's Angel, miniseries, #1, 3–5 (with Geoff Senior, 1992)
- Death's Head #1–5, 7, 10 (1988–1989)
- Death's Head II #1 (with Liam Sharp, 1992)
- Doctor Who Magazine #139 (1988)
- Dragon's Claws #3 (1988)
- G.I. Joe: European Missions #2, 6 (1988)
- The Incomplete Death's Head #8–9, 11–12 (1993)
- Mys-Tech Wars #1–4 (1993)
- Transformers #151, 172–173 (with Simon Furman, 1988)

==== Valiant Comics ====
- Ninjak: Yearbook #1 (1994)
- The Visitor vs. the Valiant Universe, miniseries, #1–2 (1995)

=== Cover work ===
- Action Force #47 (Marvel UK, 1988)
- The Transformers #154–155, 160–161, 279 (Marvel UK, 1988–1990)
- The Transformers Special #9–10 (Marvel UK, 1988)
- Death's Head #4–5, 8–9 (Marvel UK, 1989)
- Marvel Comics Presents #44 (Marvel, 1990)
- Nick Fury, Agent of S.H.I.E.L.D. #18–19 (Marvel, 1990–1991)
- Hell's Angel #1, 3 (Marvel UK, 1992)
- Dark Angel #6–7 (Marvel UK, 1992–1993)
- Knights of Pendragon #3, 5, 7–8 (Marvel UK, 1992–1993)
- Codename: Genetix #1–2 (Marvel UK, 1993)
- Die Cut #3 (Marvel UK, 1994)
- Mantra #12–14, 23 (Malibu, 1994–1995)
- Prime #23 (Malibu, 1995)
- X-O Manowar #43 (Malibu, 1995)
- X-Men Adventures vol. 3 #7 (Marvel, 1995)
- The Phoenix Resurrection: Genesis #1 (Malibu, 1995)
- The Phoenix Resurrection #0 (Malibu, 1996)
- DCU Heroes Secret Files #1 (DC Comics, 1999)
- DCU Villains Secret Files #1 (DC Comics, 1999)
- JLA 80-Page Giant #2 (DC Comics, 1999)
- JLA Showcase 80-Page Giant #1 (DC Comics, 2000)
- Superman: The Man of Steel #97 (DC Comics, 2000)
- The Titans #14 (DC Comics, 2000)
- Superman: Metropolis Secret Files #1 (DC Comics, 2000)
- Jenny Sparks: The Secret History of the Authority #1 (Wildstorm, 2000)
- Star Trek: The Next Generation – The Killing Shadows #1 (Wildstorm, 2000)
- JLA #51, 56–58 (DC Comics, 2001)
- Ultimate Fantastic Four #1, 3–5 (Marvel, 2004)
- Ultimate Iron Man #1 (Marvel, 2005)
- X-Men: Age of Apocalypse #1 (Marvel, 2005)
- New Avengers #6 (Marvel, 2005)
- Serenity #1 (Dark Horse, 2005)
- The Ultimates 2 Annual #1 (Marvel, 2005)
- The Amazing Spider-Man #529, 546 (Marvel, 2006–2008)
- The Incredible Hulk #92 (Marvel, 2006)
- Fantastic Four #536, 569, 645 (Marvel, 2006–2010)
- Iron Man #7 (Marvel, 2006)
- Wolverine: Origins #2 (Marvel, 2006)
- Annihilation #1 (Marvel, 2006)
- Giant-Size Avengers #1 (Marvel, 2008)
- X-Force #1 (Marvel, 2008)
- Captain Britain and MI13 #1–8 (Marvel, 2008–2009)
- X-Force Special: Ain't No Dog #1 (Marvel, 2008)
- Secret Invasion: Dark Reign #1 (Marvel, 2009)
- Fantastic Force #1–4 (Marvel, 2009)
- Enter the Heroic Age #1 (Marvel, 2010)
- Vengeance of the Moon Knight #8 (Marvel, 2010)
- Captain America: Man Out of Time #1–5 (Marvel, 2011)
- Ultimate Comics: Avengers vs. New Ultimates #1, 6 (Marvel, 2011)
- Ultimate Comics: Doom #1–4 (Marvel, 2011)
- Wolverine: The Best There Is #1–12 (Marvel, 2011–2012)
- Tomb of Dracula Presents: Throne of Blood #1 (Marvel, 2011)
- Moon Knight #1 (Marvel, 2011)
- Ultimate Comics: Fallout #6 (Marvel, 2011)
- Punisher #1–6, 9, 11 (Marvel, 2011–2012)
- Daredevil #4 (Marvel, 2011)
- Kick-Ass 2 #5 (Icon, 2012)
- Avengers: X-Sanction #1 (Marvel, 2012)
- Age of Apocalypse #1 (Marvel, 2012)
- Supercrooks #2 (Icon, 2012)
- The Secret Service #1 (Icon, 2012)
- The Walking Dead #100 (Image, 2012)
- Secret Origins vol. 3 #7–11 (DC Comics, 2014–2015)
- Wonder Woman vol. 5 #31–37 (cover art) (DC Comics, 2017)

Preceded by n/a	The Authority artist 1999–2000	Succeeded by Frank Quitely
Preceded by Steve Scott	JLA artist 2000–2001	Succeeded by Darryl Banks
Preceded by Paul Pelletier	Fantastic Four artist 2008–2009	Succeeded by Stuart Immonen
