= Peter Snejbjerg =

Danish comic book artist

- Born: Peter Snejbjerg Nielsen; 1963 Denmark
- Areas: Penciller, Inker

Peter Snejbjerg is a Danish comic book artist. He was educated at the Kolding Kunsthåndværkerskole from 1983 to 1987. Some of his major works include the DC Comics title Starman, and various Vertigo titles. He has also drawn several issues of Dark Horse Comics' BPRD titles. Snejbjerg has cited Hergé's Tintin, Carl Barks' Donald Duck stories, and Will Eisner's The Spirit as his earliest artistic influences, noting that he began drawing comics before learning to read or write.

== Career ==
In recent years, Snejbjerg joined the creator-owned media company Ghost Machine as a founding co-owner, where he works on titles such as Hornsby & Halo.

== Bibliography ==
Comics work includes:

- "Tarzan: The Scar" (with writer Henning Kure, in Tarzan: Love, Lies and the Lost City, 3-issue mini-series, Malibu Comics, August–October 1992)
- The Lords of Misrule (recoloured hardcover, Radical Comics, 264 pages, June 2009, ISBN 0-9802335-8-5) collects:
  - "Expressway to Your Skull" (art with John Tomlinson, in Monster Massacre, Atomeka Press, 1993)
  - "The Lords of Misrule" (art and script (#121), with writers Steve White (#120) and John Tomlinson, in Dark Horse Presents #120-122, April–June 1997)
  - The Lords of Misrule (art, with co-authors Dan Abnett/John Tomlinson/Steve White, black and white 6-issue limited series, Dark Horse Comics, January–June 1997, black and white softcover, 200 pages, Dark Horse, 1999, ISBN 1-56971-352-9)
- Hellblazer #77 (with Garth Ennis, Vertigo, May 1994)
- Preacher #50, Special: Tall Tales (with Garth Ennis, Vertigo, 1999–2000)
- The Books of Magic #5, 15–17, 30-38 (with John Ney Rieber, Vertigo, September 1994, August–October 1995, November 1996 - July 1997)
- Animal Man #77 (with writer Jamie Delano, DC Comics, November 1994)
- The Dreaming #1-3, 27, 29 (with Terry LaBan (#1-3) and Caitlin R. Kiernan (#27), Vertigo, June–August 1996, August and October 1998)
- Starman vol. 2 #50-80 (with James Robinson, DC Comics, February 1999 - August 2001)
- Adventure Comics vol. 2 #1 (pencils, with writers David Goyer/James Robinson and inks by Keith Champagne, DC Comics, May 1999)
- The Light Brigade (with Peter Tomasi, 4-issue mini-series, DC Comics, 2004)
- Battlefields: Dear Billy (with Garth Ennis, 3-issue mini-series, Dynamite Entertainment, 2009, Dear Billy tpb, 88 pages, November 2009, ISBN 1-60690-075-7, The Complete Battlefields Volume 1, hardcover, 268 pages, December 2009, ISBN 1-60690-079-X)
- The Mighty #1-4 (with Keith Champagne/Peter Tomasi, 12-issue limited series, DC Comics, April–July 2009)
- Abe Sapien: The Abyssal Plain #1-2 (with writers Mike Mignola and John Arcudi)
- A God Somewhere (with John Arcudi, graphic novel, 200 pages, Wildstorm, June 2010, ISBN 1-4012-2683-3)

== Awards ==
Nominated for the 1997 "Best Long Comic Strip" and 2005 "Best Cover" Haxtur Awards.

Awarded The Claus Deleuran Award in 2019 as Best Danish Comic Book Artist.
