= Peter Tomasi =

American comic book editor and writer (born 1967)

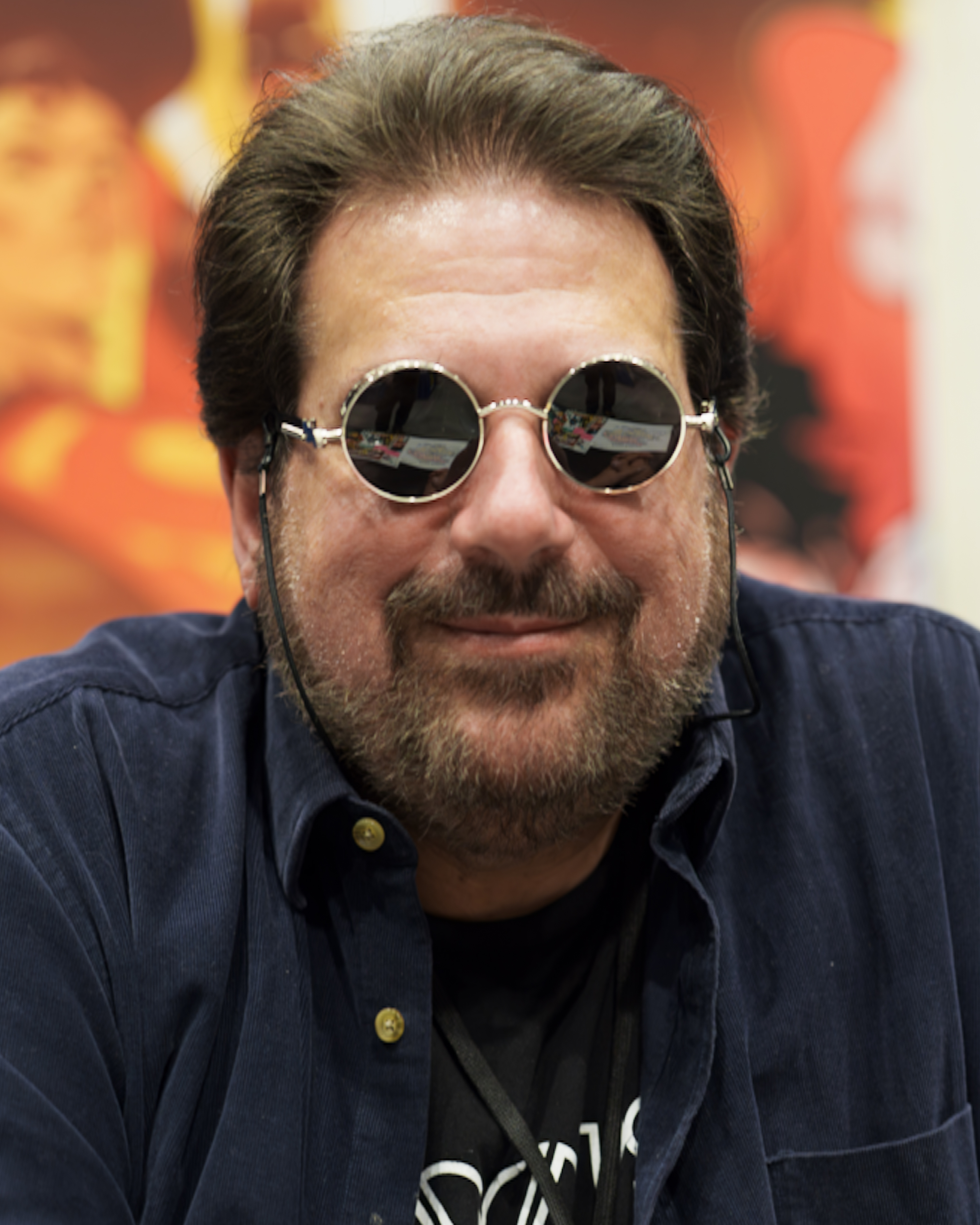
- Tomasi at GalaxyCon Oklahoma City in 2026
- Born: August 18, 1967 (age 59)
- Areas: Writer, Editor
- Notable works: Batman and Robin; Brightest Day; Green Lantern Corps; Nightwing; Superman

Peter J. Tomasi is an American comic book editor and writer, best known for his work for DC Comics. As an editor, he oversaw numerous comic books featuring the Justice League, including series starring various members of that team such as Batman, Aquaman, Martian Manhunter, Green Lantern, and the Flash. As a writer, he has written titles featuring Batman-related characters, such as Batman and Robin and The Outsiders, and Green Lantern-related series such as Blackest Night (alongside Geoff Johns), Brightest Day and Green Lantern: Emerald Warriors. He also wrote the screenplay for the animated movie The Death of Superman.

== Early life ==
Peter Tomasi became a fan of comics at a young age through the Batman comic books his father bought him, and through TV shows such as the Super Friends animated series and the Adam West Batman series. Batman was the first superhero who entered his consciousness, as it was the first character he dressed up as for Halloween, and the first comic book whose creators he recognized. Specifically he cites the work of Dennis O'Neil and Neal Adams as the first to draw him into the character, as well as Bob Haney's work on The Brave and the Bold and that of Jim Aparo.

== Career ==
Starting as an editor at DC Comics in 1993, and working on such titles as Green Lantern, the Batman titles, Aquaman, Hawkman, and JSA, Tomasi was an occasional writer on various titles, including JSA, The Outsiders, Steel, and The Light Brigade. In 2003, DC promoted him to Senior Editor.

In 2007, Tomasi left his 14-year role as an editor and transitioned to writing. He began on the limited series Black Adam: The Dark Age. In 2008, he wrote Requiem, a tie-in to Final Crisis that paid tribute to the fallen Martian Manhunter. Tomasi wrote the Nightwing title for 14 issues until its cancellation in April 2009 due to events in the "Battle for the Cowl" storyline. In 2011, Tomasi took over as writer on Batman and Robin with issue No. 20 from Paul Cornell, writing the three part "Tree of Blood" storyline that ran until issue No. 22.

From 2009 to 2010, Tomasi co-wrote the creator-owned title The Mighty with Keith Champagne, as well as Green Lantern Corps through the "Blackest Night" storyline.

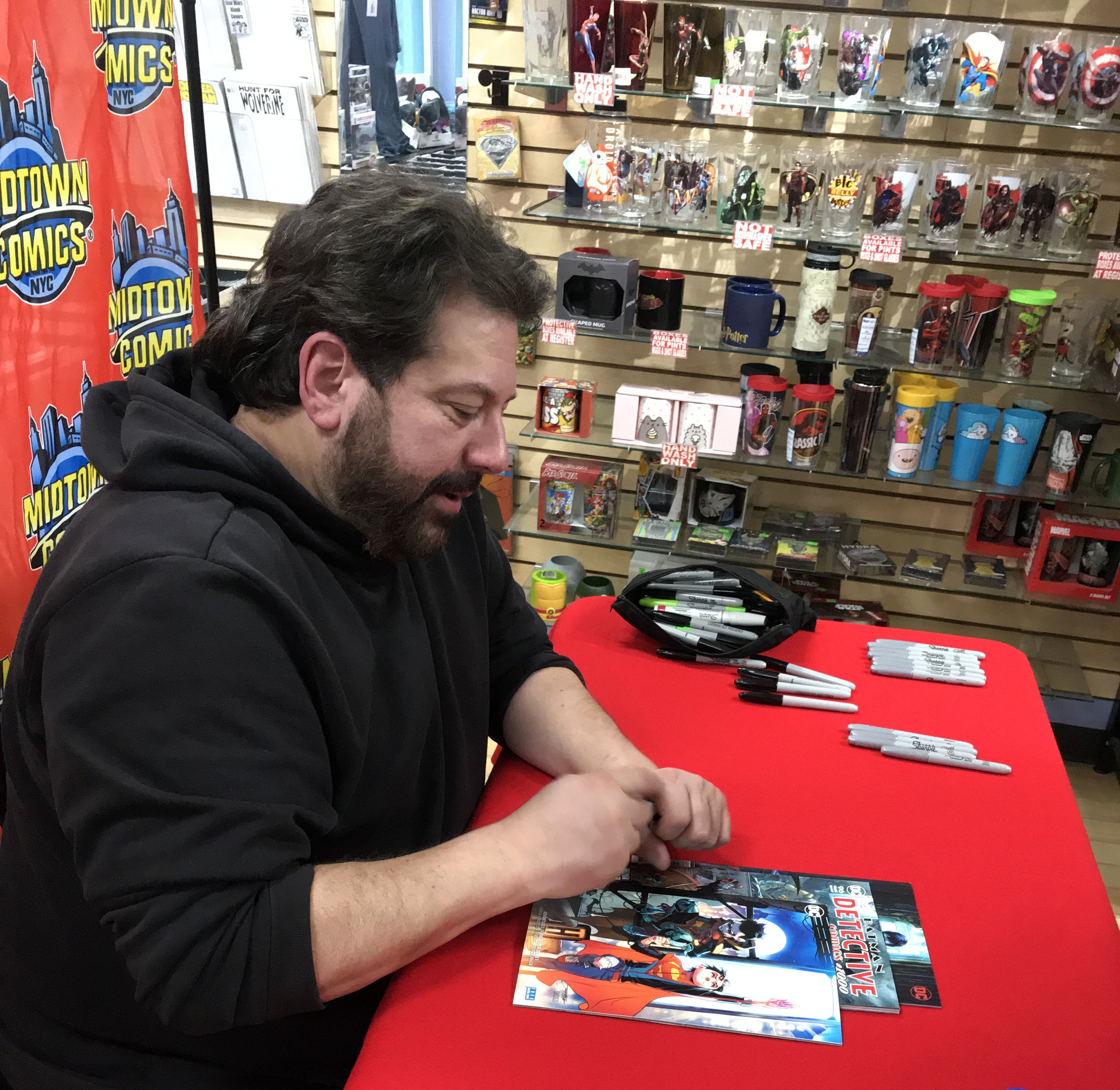
Tomasi autographing an issue of Super Sons during a 2019 signing at Midtown Comics in Manhattan

Tomasi co-wrote the "Blackest Night" follow-up maxiseries Brightest Day in 2010–2011, with Geoff Johns. During that same period, he was the regular writer on the monthly Green Lantern: Emerald Warriors and The Outsiders, which ended in 2011 as part of DC's The New 52 line-wide relaunch. As part of that relaunch, Tomasi became the writer on the relaunched volumes of Batman and Robin and Green Lantern Corps which were released in September 2011. As part of the 2016 DC Rebirth relaunch of DC's titles, Tomasi and artist Patrick Gleason became the creative team on Superman vol. 4 in June 2016. Tomasi and Jorge Jimenez produced a new version of the Super Sons beginning in 2017. The two new super-kids are Damian Wayne, son of Bruce Wayne and Talia al Ghul, and Jonathan Kent, son of Superman and Lois Lane. The series ran for 16 issues and one annual. Tomasi and Gleason crafted the "Never-Ending Battle" chapter in Action Comics #1000 (June 2018). Tomasi launched the Adventures of the Super Sons limited series in August 2018.

Tomasi penned the screenplay for the 2018 animated feature film The Death of Superman. Directed by Jake Castorena and Sam Liu, this is the eleventh film in the shared animated film continuity series: The DC Animated Movie Universe and the first of a two-part animated feature based on the comic book story arc of the same name, with part one released on August 7, 2018.

That same year, Tomasi became the new writer for Detective Comics as of issue No. 994. He concluded his run with Detective Comics issue No. 1033.

On October 12, 2023, Tomasi and a group of colleagues announced at the New York Comic Con that they were forming a cooperative media company called Ghost Machine which would publish creator-owned comics, and allow the participating creators to benefit from the development of their intellectual properties. The company publishes its books through Image Comics, and its founding creators include Geoff Johns, Brad Meltzer, Jason Fabok, Gary Frank, Bryan Hitch, and Francis Manapul, all of whom would produce comics work exclusively through that company. Tomasi's inaugural work for the company would be writing The Rocketfellers, with Manapul providing the art. The series' premise is based on the idea that Manapul explains thus: "The best place to hide when you're in the Witness Protection Program perhaps is through a different time." The story depicts a 26th century dysfunctional family who when threatened, flee by traveling through time to the year 2024, where they to encounter the strange inhabitants and culture of that era, only to find that the threat they thought they had escaped has followed them.

== Personal life ==
Tomasi has a son. In a February 2011 interview with Comic Book Resources, Tomasi discussed how his then-eight-year-old son influenced his approach to writing Damian Wayne in Batman and Robin. Tomasi also spoke about his son's influence on the way he writes Superman's son, Jon.

== Bibliography ==
=== DC Comics ===
- Showcase '95 #7–9, "Exit to Eden", "Deep Down" (with Scot Eaton and Eduardo Barreto, June–August 1995)
- The Lobo Gallery: Portraits of a Bastich, one-shot, "Portraits of a Bastich" (with among other artists, July 1995)
- The Flash Annual vol. 2 No. 9, "Silent Running" (with J. H. Williams III, 1996)
- Steel vol. 2 No. 28, "The Drowning Room", No. 33, "Withdrawal Symptoms" (with Andrew Robinson and Jim Aparo, May–October 1996)
- Showcase '96 No. 9, "Honor Bound" (with Eduardo Barreto, July 1996)
- The Light Brigade (four-issue limited series, with Peter Snejbjerg, December 2003 – March 2004, collected in Light Brigade, hc, 224 pages, 2014, ISBN 1-61655-405-3)
- Outsiders vol. 3 #26–27, "Tick Tock" (with Will Conrad, July–August 2005)
- JSA Classified #8–9, "The Spear and the Dragon" (with Don Kramer, February 2006) collected in JSA Classified: Honor Among Thieves (tpb, 125 pages, 2007, ISBN 1-4012-1218-2)
- Black Adam: The Dark Age (six–issue limited series, with Doug Mahnke, August 2007 – January 2008, collected in Black Adam: The Dark Age, tpb, 144 pages, 2008, ISBN 1-4012-1786-9)
- Infinite Halloween Special, one-shot, "The 13 Stories of Halloween" (with among other artists, October 2007)
- Green Lantern Corps vol. 2 #18–46 (November 2007 – April 2010)
  - "The Sinestro Corps War: Hammer to Fall" (with Patrick Gleason and Jamal Igle, in No. 18, 2007) collected in Green Lantern: The Sinestro Corps War vol. 2 (hc, 192 pages, 2008, ISBN 1-4012-1800-8)
  - Ring Quest (tpb, 144 pages, 2008, ISBN 1-4012-1975-6) collects:
    - "Liberty's Light" (with Patrick Gleason, in #19, 2007)
    - "Ring Quest" (with Patrick Gleason and Carlos Magno, in No. 20, #23–26, 2008)
  - Sins of the Star Sapphire (tpb, 144 pages, 2009, ISBN 1-4012-2273-0) collects:
    - "Eye of the Beholder" (with Luke Ross, in #27–28, 2008)
    - "Sins of the Star Sapphire: Love on the Air" (with Patrick Gleason, in #29, 2008)
    - "Sins of the Star Sapphire: Empty Handed Heart" (with Patrick Gleason, in #30–31, 2008)
    - "Sins of the Star Sapphire: Hearts and Minds" (with Patrick Gleason, in #32, 2009)
  - Emerald Eclipse (hc, 160 pages, 2009, ISBN 1-4012-2528-4) collects:
    - "Emerald Eclipse" (with Patrick Gleason, in #33–38, 2009)
  - Blackest Night (hc, 264 pages, 2010, ISBN 1-4012-2788-0) collects:
    - "Fade to Black" (with Patrick Gleason, in #39, 2009)
    - "Heart of Darkness" (with Patrick Gleason, in #40, 2009)
    - "Hungry Heart" (with Patrick Gleason, in #41–42, 2009)
    - "Red Badge of Rage" (with Patrick Gleason, in #43–44, 2009–2010)
    - "Red Dawn" (with Patrick Gleason, in #45, 2010)
    - "Black Dawn" (with Patrick Gleason, in #46, 2010)
    - "Goodbye Darkness" (with Patrick Gleason, in #47, 2010)
- Nightwing vol. 2 #140–153 (January 2008 – February 2009)
  - Freefall (tpb, 168 pages, 2008, ISBN 1-4012-1965-9) collects:
    - "Freefall" (with Rags Morales and Don Kramer, in #140–146, 2008)
  - The Great Leap (tpb, 192 pages, 2009, ISBN 1-4012-2171-8) collects:
    - "The Great Leap" (with Don Kramer and Rags Morales, in #147–150, 2008)
    - "The Great Leap Epilogue:...And Into the Black" (with Doug Mahnke, in #151, 2008)
    - "Eminence Front" (with Don Kramer, in #152, 2009)
    - "Black Dawn" (with Don Kramer, in #153, 2009)
    - "Origins & Omens" (with Joe Bennet, in No. 153, 2009)
- Final Crisis: Requiem, one-shot (with Doug Mahnke, July 2008)
- Justice Society of America Kingdom Come Special: Magog, one-shot, "Magog: The Real Me" (with Fernando Pasarin, November 2008)
- Outsiders vol. 4 #15–25 (February 2009 – December 2009)
  - The Deep (tpb, 192 pages, 2009, ISBN 1-4012-2502-0) collects:
    - "The Deep" (with Lee Garbett and Fernando Pasarin, in #15–20, 2009)
    - "Origins & Omens" (with Lee Garbett, in No. 15, 2009)
  - The Hunt (tpb, 144 pages, 2010, ISBN 1-4012-2716-3) collects:
    - "The Hunt" (with Fernando Pasarin, in #21–23, 2009)
    - "Matter of Trust" (with Fernando Pasarin, in #24, 2009)
    - "Turn to Stone" (with Fernando Pasarin and Derec Donovan, in No. 25, 2009)
- The Mighty #1–12 (February 2009 – January 2010)
  - The Mighty (tpb, 304 pages, 2014, ISBN 1-61655-502-5) collects:
    - "The New World" (with Keith Champagne and Peter Snejbjerg, in No. 1, 2009)
    - "New Blood" (with Keith Champagne and Peter Snejbjerg, in No. 2, 2009)
    - "Dirge" (with Keith Champagne and Peter Snejbjerg, in No. 3, 2009)
    - "Everybody Pays" (with Keith Champagne and Peter Snejbjerg, in No. 4, 2009)
    - "World Gone Wrong" (with Keith Champagne and Chris Samnee, in No. 5, 2009)
    - "Blue Moon" (with Keith Champagne and Chris Samnee, in No. 6, 2009)
    - "Ring of Fire" (with Keith Champagne and Chris Samnee, in No. 7, 2009)
    - "Wide Awake" (with Keith Champagne and Chris Samnee, in No. 8, 2009)
    - "Chums" (with Keith Champagne and Chris Samnee, in No. 9, 2009)
    - "Gates of Eden" (with Keith Champagne and Chris Samnee, in No. 10, 2009)
    - "Twilight of the God" (with Keith Champagne and Chris Samnee, in No. 11, 2009)
    - "And in the End" (with Keith Champagne and Chris Samnee, in No. 12, 2010)
- Blackest Night: Tales of the Corps limited series (July 2009)
  - Blackest Night: Tales of the Corps (hc, 176 pages, 2010, ISBN 1-4012-2807-0) collects:
    - "Tales of the Sinestro Corps: Mongul – For Your Love" (with Chris Samnee, in #1, 2009)
    - "Tales of the Orange Lanterns: Blume Godhead" (with Tom Mandrake, in No. 2, 2009)
    - "Tales of the Green Lantern Corps: Kilowog in New Blood" (with Chris Samnee, in #3, 2009)
    - "Tales of the Green Lantern Corps: Arisia in Daddy's Girl" (with Mike Mayhew, in No. 3, 2009)
- Blackest Night: Batman limited series (August 2009 – October 2009)
  - Blackest Night: Black Lantern Corps (hc, 256 pages, 2010, ISBN 1-4012-2784-8) collects:
    - "Who Burns Who" (with Ardian Syaf, in #1–3, 2009)
- The Phantom Stranger vol. 2 No. 42, "Deadman Walking" (with Ardian Syaf, January 2010)
- Brightest Day #0–24 (April 2010 – April 2011)
  - Volume 1 (hc, 256 pages, 2010, ISBN 1-4012-2966-2) collects:
    - "Carpe Diem" (with Geoff Johns and Fernando Pasarin, in No. 0, 2010)
    - "Second Chances" (with among other artists, in No. 1, 2010)
    - "Nuclear Options" (with among other artists, in No. 2, 2010)
    - "Revelations" (with among other artists, in No. 3, 2010)
    - "Thresholds" (with among other artists, in No. 4, 2010)
    - "Under Pressure" (with among other artists, in No. 5, 2010)
    - "Dead Zone" (with among other artists, in No. 6, 2010)
    - "The Secret of Life, Part One" (with among other artists, in No. 7, 2010)
  - Volume 2 (hc, 240 pages, 2011, ISBN 1-4012-3083-0) collects:
    - "The Secret of Life, Part Two" (with among other artists, in #8, 2010)
    - "Lost & Found" (with among other artists, in #9, 2010)
    - "A Change is Gonna Come" (with among other artists, in #10, 2010)
    - "Father's Day" (with among other artists, in #11, 2010)
    - "All This Useless Beauty" (with among other artists, in #12, 2010)
    - "Under a Blood Red Sky" (with among other artists, in #13, 2010)
    - "Acrobats" (with Geoff Johns, Ivan Reis and Joe Prado, in No. 14, 2010)
    - "Whatever Happened to the Manhunter from Mars?" (with Geoff Johns, Patrick Gleason and Scott Clark, in No. 15, 2010)
    - "Short Fuse" (with among other artists, in No. 16, 2010)
  - Volume 3 (hc, 280 pages, 2012, ISBN 1-4012-3216-7) collects:
    - "Homecoming" (with among other artists, in #17, 2011)
    - "Easy Come Easy Go" (with among other artists, in #18, 2011)
    - "Aquawar, Part One" (with among other artists, in #19, 2011)
    - "Aquawar, Part Two" (with Geoff Johns, Ivan Reis and Joe Prado, in #20, 2011)
    - "Mars Attacks" (with among other artists, in #21, 2011)
    - "The End and The Beginning" (with among other artists, in #22, 2011)
    - "Rise and Fall" (with among other artists, in #23, 2011)
    - "Brightest Day" (with among other artists, in #24, 2011)
- Green Lantern: Emerald Warriors #1–13 (August 2010 – August 2011)
  - Volume 1 (hc, 176 pages, 2011, ISBN 1-4012-3079-2) collects:
    - "Last Will" (with Fernando Pasarin, in #1, 2010)
    - "Last Will: Lie of the Mind" (with Fernando Pasarin, in #2–3, 2010)
    - "Last Will: No Mercy" (with Fernando Pasarin, in #4, 2010)
    - "Last Will" (with Fernando Pasarin, in #5–6, 2010–2011)
    - "Last Will: Seeing Red" (with Fernando Pasarin, in #7, 2011)
  - Green Lantern: War of the Green Lanterns (hc, 272 pages, 2011, ISBN 1-4012-3234-5) collects:
    - "War of the Green Lanterns: Part 3" (with Fernando Pasarin, in #8, 2011)
    - "War of the Green Lanterns: Part 6" (with Fernando Pasarin, in #9, 2011)
    - "War of the Green Lanterns: Part 9" (with Fernando Pasarin, in #10, 2011)
  - War of the Green Lanterns: Aftermath
    - "Rest and Relaxation" (with Bernard Chang, in No. 11, 2011)
    - "The Beast" (with Chris Batista, in No. 12, 2011)
    - "2011: A Space Oddity" (with Ron Frenz, in No. 13, 2011)
- Superman/Batman #75, "We can be Heroes" (with Gene Ha, August 2010)
- Batman and Robin #20–22 (February–April 2011)
  - "Dark Knight vs. White Knight: Tree of Blood" (with Patrick Gleason, in #20–22, 2011) collected in Dark Knight Vs. White Knight (hc, 208 pages, 2012, ISBN 1-4012-3373-2)
- Green Lantern Super Spectacular, "New Blood" (with Chris Samnee, May 2011)
- Green Lantern Movie Prequel: Kilowog, one-shot, "To Build a Better Lantern" (with Carlos Ferreira, July 2011)
- Green Lantern Corps vol. 3 #1–20 (September 2011 – May 2013)
  - Volume 1: Fearsome (hc, 160 pages, 2012, ISBN 1-4012-3701-0) collects:
    - "Triumph of the Will" (with Fernando Pasarin, in #1, 2011)
    - "Willful" (with Fernando Pasarin, in #2, 2011)
    - "Force of Will" (with Geraldo Borges, in No. 3, 2011)
    - "Prisoners of War" (with Fernando Pasarin, in No. 4, 2011)
    - "Mean Machine" (with Fernando Pasarin, in No. 5, 2012)
    - "Fearsome" (with Fernando Pasarin, in No. 6, 2012)
    - "Rendering Honor" (with Claude St. Aubin, in No. 7, 2012)
  - Volume 2: Alpha War (hc, 192 pages, 2013, ISBN 1-4012-4012-7) collects:
    - "Alpha War" (with Fernando Pasarin, in #8, 2012)
    - "Alpha War: Tried and True" (with Fernando Pasarin, in #9, 2012)
    - "Alpha War: Executioner's Song" (with Fernando Pasarin, in #10, 2012)
    - "Alpha-War: Brilliant Mistakes" (with Fernando Pasarin, in #11, 2012)
    - "The Conclusion of Alpha Wars: Meditations in Green" (with Fernando Pasarin, in #12, 2012)
    - "Freshman" (with Fernando Pasarin, in #0, 2012)
  - Volume 3: Willpower (hc, 256 pages, 2013, ISBN 1-4012-4407-6) collects:
    - "Rise of the Third Army: Torn" (with Carlos Urbano, in No. 13, 2012)
    - "Rise of the Third Army: Nothing Man" (with Fernando Pasarin, in #14, 2012)
    - "Rise of the Third Army: Falling Star" (with Fernando Pasarin, in #15, 2012)
    - "Rise of the Third Army: Bad Guys" (with Fernando Pasarin, in #16, 2013)
    - "Rise of the Third Army: Rise of the First Lantern" (with ChrisCross, in Annual No. 1, 2013)
    - "Wrath of the First Lantern Part 2: Decimated" (with Fernando Pasarin, in No. 17, 2013)
    - "Wrath of the First Lantern Part 6: Pieces of You" (with ChrisCross, in No. 18, 2013)
    - "Wrath of the First Lantern Part 10: Willing" (with Fernando Pasarin, in No. 19, 2013)
    - "Wrath of the First Lantern Epiligue: Coda" (with Fernando Pasarin, in #20, 2013)
- Batman and Robin vol. 2 #1–40, 23.1, Annual #1–2 (September 2011 – March 2015)
  - Volume 1: Born to Kill (hc, 192 pages, 2012, ISBN 1-4012-3487-9) collects:
    - "Born to Kill" (with Patrick Gleason, in #1, 2011)
    - "Bad Blood" (with Patrick Gleason, in #2, 2011)
    - "Knightmoves" (with Patrick Gleason, in #3, 2011)
    - "Matter of Trust" (with Patrick Gleason, in #4, 2011)
    - "Mutineer" (with Patrick Gleason, in #5, 2012)
    - "The Real Me" (with Patrick Gleason, in #6, 2012)
    - "Driven" (with Patrick Gleason, in #7, 2013)
    - "Born to Kill: Black Dawn" (with Patrick Gleason, in #8, 2013)
  - Volume 2: Pearl (hc, 176 pages, 2013, ISBN 1-4012-4089-5) collects:
    - "Someday Never Comes" (with Patrick Gleason, in #0, 2012)
    - "Night of the Owls: Robin Hears a Hoo" (with Lee Garbett and Andy Clarke, in No. 9, 2012)
    - "Terminus: Scar of the Bat" (with Patrick Gleason, in #10, 2012)
    - "Terminus Branded" (with Patrick Gleason, in #11, 2012)
    - "Terminus: Last Gasp" (with Patrick Gleason, in #12, 2012)
    - "Eclipsed" (with Patrick Gleason and Tomás Giorello, in No. 13, 2012)
    - "Devoured" (with Patrick Gleason and Tomás Giorello, in No. 14, 2012)
  - Volume 3: Death of the Family (hc, 160 pages, 2013, ISBN 1-4012-4268-5) collects:
    - "Little Big Man" (with Patrick Gleason, in #15, 2012)
    - "Cast a Giant Shadow" (with Patrick Gleason, in #16, 2013)
    - "Life Is But A Dream" (with Patrick Gleason, in #17, 2013)
    - "The Punchline" (by Scott Snyder and Greg Capullo, in Batman No. 17, 2013)
    - "Batman Impossible" (with Ardian Syaf, in Annual No. 1, 2013)
  - Volume 4: Requiem for Damian (hc, 176 pages, 2014, ISBN 1-4012-4618-4) collects:
    - "Undone" (with Patrick Gleason, in #18, 2013)
    - "Denial" (with Patrick Gleason, in #19, 2013)
    - "Rage" (with Patrick Gleason and Cliff Richards, in No. 20, 2013)
    - "The Bargain" (with Cliff Richards, in No. 21, 2013)
    - "Despair" (with Patrick Gleason, in No. 22, 2013)
    - "Acceptance" (with Patrick Gleason, in No. 23, 2013)
  - Volume 5: The Big Burn (hc, 176 pages, 2014, ISBN 1-4012-5059-9) collects:
    - "A Tale of Two Faces" (with Guillem March, in #23.1: Two-Face, 2013)
    - "The Big Burn: First Strike" (with Patrick Gleason, in #24, 2013)
    - "The Big Burn: Sparks" (with Patrick Gleason, in #25, 2013)
    - "The Big Burn: Ignition" (with Patrick Gleason, in #26, 2013)
    - "The Big Burn: Ablaze" (with Patrick Gleason, in #27, 2014)
    - "The Big Burn: Inferno" (with Patrick Gleason, in #28, 2014)
  - "Batman and Robin: Week One" (with Doug Mahnke, in Annual #2, 2014)
  - Volume 6: The Hunt for Robin (hc, 256 pages, 2015, ISBN 1-4012-5334-2) collects:
    - "Devil and the Deep Blue Sea" (with Patrick Gleason, in #29, 2014)
    - "Paradise and Wonder" (with Patrick Gleason, in #30, 2014)
    - "City of Cold" (with Doug Mahnke, in #31, 2014)
    - "Dark of the Son" (with Patrick Gleason, in #32, 2014)
    - "Red Dawn Omega" (with Andy Kubert, in Robin Rises: Omega, 2014)
    - "Robin Rises: Cold Justice" (with Patrick Gleason, in #33, 2014)
    - "Robin Rises: Ties That Bind" (with Patrick Gleason, in #34, 2014)
  - Volume 7: Robin Rises (hc, 240 pages, 2015, ISBN 1-4012-5677-5) collects:
    - "Robin Rises: Hellbound" (with Patrick Gleason, in #35, 2014)
    - "Robin Rises: Chaos" (with Patrick Gleason, in #36, 2014)
    - "Black Hole Son" (with Patrick Gleason, in #37, 2014)
    - "Robin Rises: Alpha" (with Andy Kubert, in Robin Rises: Alpha, 2014)
    - "Superpower: Fly Robin Fly" (with Patrick Gleason, in #38, 2015)
    - "Superpower: Boy Wonder" (with Patrick Gleason, in #39, 2015)
    - "Superpower: The Dynamic Duo" (with Patrick Gleason, in #40, 2015)
    - "Moonshot" (with Juan José Ryp, in Annual No. 3, 2015)
    - "A Boy's Life" (with Ian Bertram, in Secret Origins vol. 3 No. 4, 2014)
- G.I. Combat vol. 2 #5–7, "Mettle" (with Howard Chaykin, October–December 2012) collected in Volume 1: The War That Time Forgot (tpb, 256 pages, 2013, ISBN 1-4012-3853-X)
- Batman vol. 2 #23.4: Bane, "Dark Destiny" (with Graham Nolan, September 2013)
- Detective Comics vol. 2 #23.3, 27, 45–46, 48–52 (September 2013 – July 2016)
  - "City of Fear" (with Szymon Kudranski, in #23.3: The Scarecrow, 2013)
  - "Better Days" (with Ian Bertram, in No. 27, 2014) collected in Volume 5: Gothtopia (tpb, 208 pages, 2008, ISBN 1-4012-5466-7)
  - Volume 8: Blood of Heroes (hc, 192 pages, 2016, ISBN 1-4012-6355-0) collects:
    - "Of Giants and Men" (with Marcio Takara, in No. 45, 2015)
    - "Blood on Blood" (with Marcio Takara, in No. 46, 2015)
  - Volume 9: Gordon at War (hc, 176 pages, 2016, ISBN 1-4012-6923-0) collects:
    - "The Bronze Age – Blood of Heroes" (with Fernando Pasarin, in #48, 2016)
    - "The Bronze Age – Salt of the Earth" (with Fernando Pasarin, in #49, 2016)
    - "The Bronze Age – Martyrs and Madmen" (with Fernando Pasarin and Scot Eaton, in No. 50, 2016)
    - "Our Gordon at War" (with Fernando Pasarin, in No. 51, 2016)
    - "Untitled" (with Fernando Pasarin, in No. 52, 2016)
- Forever Evil: Arkham War #1–6 (limited series) (October 2013 – April 2014)
  - Forever Evil: Arkham War (tpb, 200 pages, 2014, ISBN 1-4012-4940-X) collects:
    - "Arkham War: Batman Death March" (Scot Eaton, in #1, 2013)
    - "Arkham War: The Bane Mutiny" (Scot Eaton, in #2, 2013)
    - "Arkham War: Das Bat!" (Scot Eaton, in #3, 2013)
    - "Arkham War: Empire of the Bat" (Scot Eaton, in #4, 2014)
    - "Arkham War: Evolution" (Scot Eaton, in #5, 2014)
    - "Arkham War: World War Gotham" (Scot Eaton, in #6, 2014)
    - "Batman vs. Bane: Black Dawn" (Scot Eaton, in Forever Evil Aftermath: Batman vs. Bane, 2014)
- Superman/Wonder Woman #13–29 (November 2014 – July 2016)
  - Volume 3: Casualties of War (hc, 144 pages, 2015, ISBN 1-4012-5768-2) collects:
    - "Battlefield of Love" (with Doug Mahnke, in #13, 2014)
    - "All that Burns" (with Doug Mahnke, in #14, 2014)
    - "Dark Testament" (with Dough Mahnke and Ed Benes, in No. 15, 2015)
    - "Vengeance So Dear" (with Dough Mahnke and Ed Benes, in No. 16, 2015)
    - "Casualties of War" (with Dough Mahnke and Ed Benes, in No. 17, 2015)
  - Volume 4: Dark Truth (hc, 192 pages, 2016, ISBN 1-4012-6322-4) collects:
    - "Dark Truth" (with Dough Mahnke, in #18–20, 2015)
    - "Lies" (with Dough Mahnke, in #21, 2015)
    - "Heart of the Sun" (with Dough Mahnke, in #22, 2015)
    - "Ravenous" (with Dough Mahnke, in #23, 2015)
    - "Power Hungry" (with Dough Mahnke, Ardian Syaf and Tom Derenick in No. 24, 2015)
  - Volume 5: A Savege End (hc, 208 pages, 2016, ISBN 1-4012-6545-6) collects:
    - "A God Somewhere" (with Dough Mahnke, in #25, 2016)
    - "Skyfall" (with Dough Mahnke, in #26, 2016)
    - "Slam Bang" (with Cliff Richards, in #27, 2016)
    - "The Final Days of Superman, Part 4: Last Kiss" (with Ed Benes, in #28, 2016)
    - "The Final Days of Superman, Part 7: Fire Line" (with Jorge Jiménez, in No. 29, 2016)
- Batman: Arkham Knight #1–12, Annual No. 1 (March 2015 – December 2015)
  - Volume 1 (hc, 144 pages, 2015, ISBN 1-4012-5804-2) collects:
    - "Death of a Rival" (with Viktor Bogdanovic, in No. 1, 2015)
    - "The Last Will and Testament of the Joker" (with Viktor Bogdanovic, in No. 2, 2015)
    - "You Can Fight City Hall" (with Ig Guara, in No. 3, 2015)
    - "Need for Speed" (with Robson Rocha, in No. 4, 2015)
    - "Roadkill" (with Viktor Bogdanovic, in No. 4, 2015)
    - "Bane of Existence" (with Viktor Bogdanovic and Ig Guara, in #5–6, 2015)
  - Volume 2 (hc, 144 pages, 2016, ISBN 1-4012-6067-5) collects:
    - "Who Wants To Kill A Billionaire?" (with Viktor Bogdanovic and Ig Guara, in #7–8, 2015)
    - "Suicide Blues" (with Ig Guara and Viktor Bogdanovic, in #9, 2015)
    - "Burning the Days" (with Ig Guara and Viktor Bogdanovic, in #10, 2015)
    - "Scare Tactics" (with Ig Guara and Viktor Bogdanovic, in #11–12, 2015–2016)
  - "Fear City" (with Stephen Segovia, in Annual No. 1, September 2015)
  - "The Apprentice" (with Robson Rocha, in Robin Special, November 2015)
- Batman: Arkham Knight Genesis (six-issue limited series, with Alisson Borges and Dexter Soy, August 2015 – January 2016, collected in Batman: Arkham Knight Genesis, hc, 144 pages, 2016, ISBN 1-4012-6066-7)
- Justice League: Darkseid War: Batman, one-shot, "God Only Knows" (with Fernando Pasarin, October 2015)
- Superman Annual No. 3, "Savage Dawn" (with various artists, December 2015) collected in Superman: Savage Dawn (hc, 200 pages, 2016, ISBN 1-4012-7004-2)
- Superman vol. 3 #51–52 (with Mikel Janín and Miguel Sepulveda, June–July 2016)
- Action Comics vol. 2 #51–52 (with Paul Pelletier, Dale Eaglesham and Scot Eaton, June–July 2016)
- Batman/Superman #31–32 (with Doug Mahnke, June–July 2016)
- Superman: Rebirth #1 (co-written with Patrick Gleason, August 2016)
- Superman vol. 4 #1–25, 27-28, 33-39, 42-45, Annual #1, Special #1 (co-written with Patrick Gleason, August 2016 – July 2018)
- Super Sons #1–16, Annual #1 (with Jorge Jimenez, April 2017 – July 2018)
- Batman:The Merciless #1 (with Francis Manapul, December 2017)
- Action Comics #1000 (with Patrick Gleason, June 2018)
- Super Sons / Dynomutt Special No. 1 (with Fernando Pasarin, July 2018)
- Superman Special No. 1 (with Patrick Gleason, July 2018)
- Adventures of the Super Sons #1–12 (with Carlo Barberi, October 2018 – September 2019)
- Detective Comics #994–1033, Annual #2–3 (with Doug Mahnke among other artists, February 2019 - February 2021)

=== Dark Horse Comics ===
- House of Penance (with Ian Bertram and Dave Stewart, 2017)

Preceded by Judd Winick	The Outsiders writer 2005	Succeeded by Judd Winick
Preceded by Bob Schreck	Batman group editor 2006–2007	Succeeded by Mike Marts
Preceded by Dave Gibbons	Green Lantern Corps writer 2007–2008	Succeeded by Sterling Gates
Preceded by Sterling Gates	Green Lantern Corps writer 2008–2010	Succeeded by Tony Bedard
Preceded by Fabian Nicieza	Nightwing writer 2008–2009	Succeeded by Kyle Higgins
Preceded by Frank Tieri	The Outsiders writer 2009–2010	Succeeded by Dan DiDio
Preceded by Paul Cornell	Batman and Robin writer 2011	Succeeded by Judd Winick
Preceded by Scott Kolins	Green Lantern Corps writer 2011–2013	Succeeded by Van Jensen and Robert Venditti
Preceded by Judd Winick	Batman and Robin vol. 2 writer 2011–2015	Succeeded by n/a
Preceded by Francis Manapul and Brian Buccellato	Detective Comics vol. 2 writer 2015–2016	Succeeded by James Tynion IV
