= Francis Manapul =

Filipino Canadian comic book artist and writer

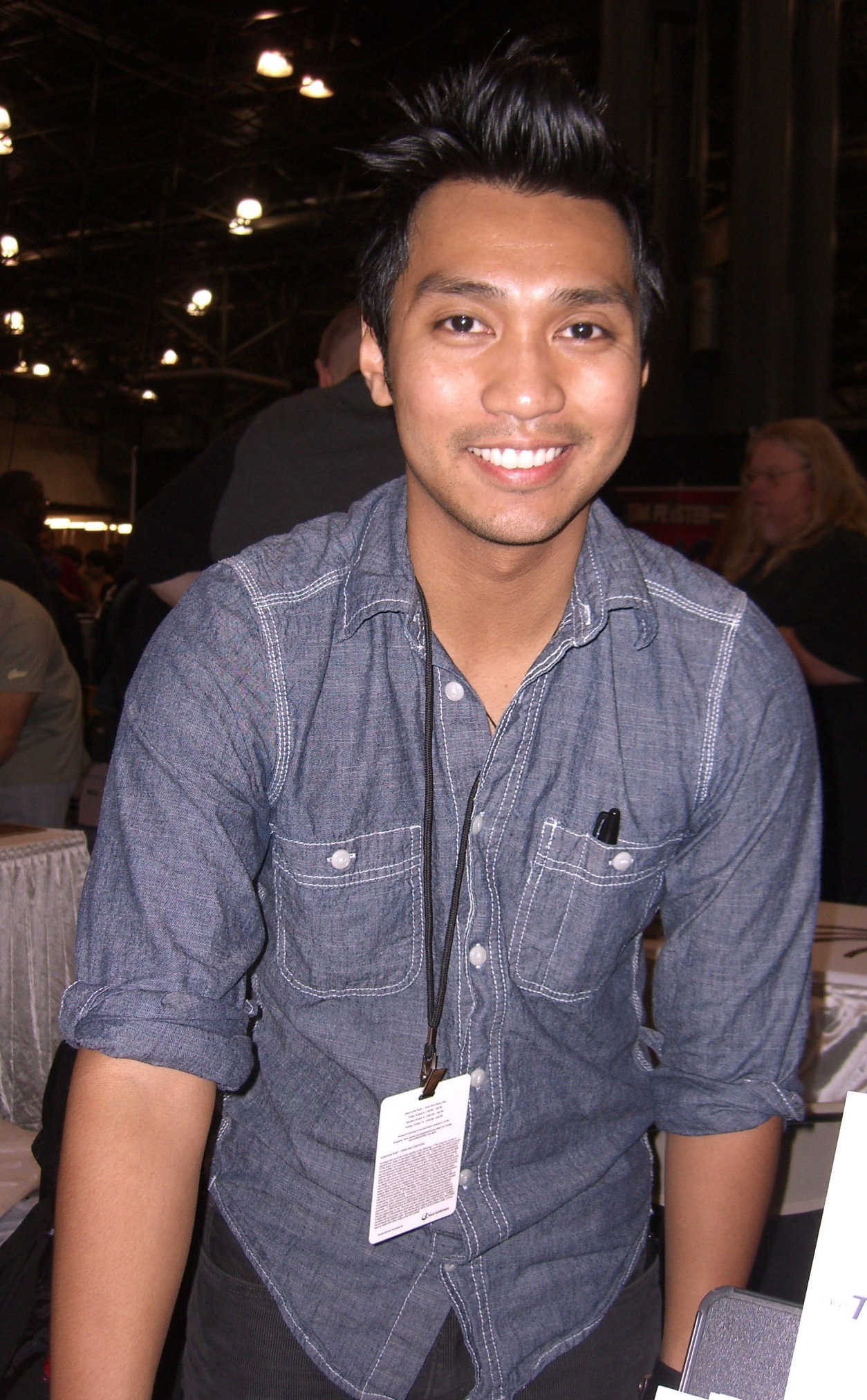
- Manapul at the New York Comic Con in Manhattan, October 10, 2010
- Born: August 26, 1979 (age 47) Manila, Philippines
- Area: Artist
- Notable works: Witchblade; The Necromancer; The Flash
- Awards: Joe Shuster Award for Outstanding Artist (2011); Inkwell Award for The All-in-One Award (2011)

Francis Manapul (born August 26, 1979) is a Canadian-Filipino comic book artist and writer.

== Career ==
Manapul is known for his work on Witchblade and The Necromancer for Top Cow, working on the former for three years, off and on, returning for the tenth anniversary issue in 2005. He has provided covers for various titles, most notably for some G.I. Joe comics from Devil's Due Publishing.

In 2007, he signed an exclusive contract to work with DC Comics. Manapul served as a guest judge in the fourth week round of the third season of Comic Book Idol, a comic book art competition sponsored by Comic Book Resources.

In 2008 Francis became the artist for DC's Legion of Superheroes with Jim Shooter as the writer. Francis co-created the character Gazelle with Shooter before leaving the title. In January 2010, Newsarama named Manapul one of ten creators to watch for the coming year. In 2009, he was named to be the artist in DC's new Flash series written by Geoff Johns which stars Barry Allen in the lead role.

He was also one of the TV presenters on Beast Legends from Yap films, which currently airs Wednesday nights at 10pm EST on History Television Canada. Its premiere in the US was on September 9, Thursday at 10pm EST on SyFy.

In 2011 Manapul was awarded the Joe Shuster Award for Outstanding Artist and the All-in-One Award (Favorite artist known for almost-exclusively inking his/her own interior comic book pencil work and rarely the work of others in '10) from the Inkwell Awards. That May, DC Comics announced a massive revamp and relaunch of their entire superhero line, as part of this Francis was named writer/artist on the Flash, with his longtime colorist/collaborator, Brian Buccellato co-writing with him.

In April 2014, Manapul and Buccellato moved from The Flash to Detective Comics. That August, Manapul created Batman poster for New York Comic Con. In 2016, Manapul became the writer and artist for the DC Rebirth comic book series Trinity.

On October 12, 2023, Manapul and a group of colleagues announced at the New York Comic Con that they were forming a cooperative media company called Ghost Machine which would publish creator-owned comics, and allow the participating creators to benefit from the development of their intellectual properties. The company publishes its books through Image Comics, and its founding creators include Geoff Johns, Brad Meltzer, Jason Fabok, Gary Frank, Bryan Hitch, and Peter J. Tomasi, all of whom would produce comics work exclusively through that company. Manapul's inaugural work for Ghost Machine would be drawing The Rocketfellers, which is written by Tomasi. The series' premise is based on the idea that Manapul explains thus: "The best place to hide when you're in the Witness Protection Program perhaps is through a different time." The story depicts a 26th century dysfunctional family who when threatened, flee by traveling through time to the year 2024, where they to encounter the strange inhabitants and culture of that era, only to find that the threat they thought they had escaped has followed them.

== Bibliography ==
=== Interior work ===
- Love in Tights #1 (with J. Torres, Slave Labor Graphics, 1998)
- Monster Fighters, Inc. (with J. Torres, Image):
  - The Ghosts of Christmas (one-shot, 1999)
  - The Black Book (one-shot, 2000)
- Fear Effect: Retro Helix (with Frank Mastromauro and David Wohl, one-shot, Top Cow, 2001)
- Witchblade (Top Cow):
  - "XLVIII" (with Paul Jenkins, in #48, 2001)
  - Witchblade/Lady Death (with David Wohl and Joel Gomez, one-shot, 2001)
  - "LIII" (with Paul Jenkins, David Wohl and Brian Ching, in #53, 2002)
  - "The Return of Tora No Shi" (with David Wohl and Joel Gomez, in #54-57, 2002)
  - "Endgame, Part Two" (with David Wohl, Joel Gomez and Eric Basaldua, in #60, 2002)
  - "LXII-LXV" (with David Wohl, Joel Gomez, Mike Choi and Romano Molenaar, in #62-65, 2003)
  - "Road Trip" (with David Wohl, Joel Gomez and Mike Choi, in #68-69, 2003)
  - "Death Pool" (with David Wohl, Joel Gomez, Mike Choi and David Nakayama, in #70 & 72-75, 2003–2004)
  - "10th Anniversary" (with Ron Marz and various artists, in #92, 2005)
- Tomb Raider: The Series (Top Cow):
  - "Without Limit" (with Dan Jurgens, in #15, 2001)
  - "Alpha Omega" (with Dan Slott, in #50, 2005)
- Image Comics FCBD '04: "First Strike" (with Robert Place Napton, Image, 2004)
- Magdalena/Vampirella (with Robert Kirkman, one-shot, Top Cow, 2004)
- The Darkness #21: "The Reckoning" (with Brian Buccelato, Top Cow, 2005)
- Necromancer #1-6 (with Joshua Ortega, Top Cow, 2006)
- The Iron Saint (with Jason Rubin, Aspen):
  - Iron and the Maiden #0-4 (with Joel Gomez, 2007)
  - Iron and the Maiden: Brutes, Bims and the City (with various artists, one-shot, 2008)
- Sept Guerrières (7 Warriors) (with Michaël Le Galli, graphic novel, Delcourt, 2008)
- Legion of Superheroes (Vol. 5) #37-46, 48-49 (2008–2009)
- Adventure Comics #0-3, 5-6 (with Geoff Johns, DC Comics, 2009–2010)
- Superman/Batman #60-61 (2009), #75 (2010)
- The Flash (Vol. 3) #1-6, 9-10, 12 (2010–2011)
- The Flash (Vol. 4) #1-25 (writer/artist, with Brian Buccellato, 2011–2013)
- Detective Comics (Vol. 2) #30-34, 37-44 (writer/artist, with Brian Buccellato, DC Comics, 2014-2015)
- Flash Special Edition #1 (2014)
- Batman and Robin Eternal #5 (2015)
- Justice League (Vol. 2) #45-46 (2015)
- Trinity (Vol. 2) #1-2 (2016), #5-6 (2017), #9-11 (2017)
- Batman: The Merciless #1 (2017)
- Justice League: No Justice #1-4 (2018)
- Justice League (Vol. 4) #10-11 (2018), #22 (2019)
- Aquaman/Justice League Drowned Earth #1 (2018)
- Clear (with Scott Snyder, independent, released as ComiXology Original, 2021)

=== Cover work ===
==== Aspen MLT ====
- Soulfire: Chaos Reign #2 (Aspen, 2006)
- Aspen Showcase: Benoist #1 (Aspen, 2008)
- Executive Assistant Iris #2 (Aspen, 2009)
- Soulfire #2 (Aspen, 2010)

==== DC Comics ====
- Legion of Superheroes #47, 50 (2008–2009)
- Wonder Woman #32 (2009)
- Red Robin #1-5 (2009)
- Green Lantern (Vol. 4) #45 (variant cover) (2009)
- Blackest Night: The Flash #1-3 (variant covers) (2009-2010)
- The Shield (Vol. 2) #1-3 (2009–2010)
- Justice League of America (Vol. 2) #46 (variant cover) (2010), #49 (variant cover) (2010)
- Adventure Comics #4 (2010)
- Superboy (Vol. 4) #5 (variant cover) (2011)
- T.H.U.N.D.E.R. Agents (Vol. 3) #5 (2011)
- The Flash (Vol. 3) #7, #11 (2011)
- Flashpoint: Grodd of War #1 (2011)
- Flashpoint: Kid Flash Lost #1-3 (2011)
- Green Lantern Corps (Vol. 2) #62 (variant cover) (2011)
- Green Lantern (Vol. 5) #4 (variant cover) (2012)
- Sword of Sorcery Featuring Amethyst (Vol. 2) #2 (variant cover) (2012)
- Superman Unchained #5 (Superman 75th Anniversary 1930s variant cover) (2013)
- Flash Season Zero #1 (variant cover) (2014)
- Lobo (Vol. 3) #3 (variant cover) (2014)
- Superman (Vol. 4) #36 (variant cover) (2014)
- Superman/Wonder Woman #16 (variant cover) (2015)
- Justice League of America (Vol. 4) #2 (variant cover) (2015)
- Aquaman (Vol. 5) #44 (variant cover) (2015)
- Convergence #4 (variant cover) (2015)
- Multiversity #2 (variant cover) (2015)
- Batman/Superman #25 (2015)
- Justice League: The Darkseid War Superman #1 (2015)
- Justice League: The Darkseid War Lex Luthor #1 (2015)
- Justice League: The Darkseid War Flash #1 (2015)
- Justice League: The Darkseid War SHAZAM #1 (2015)
- Justice League: The Darkseid War Batman #1 (2015)
- Justice League: The Darkseid War Green Lantern #1 (2015)
- Batgirl (Vol. 5) #1-12 (variant covers) (2016-2017), #34-36 (2019)
- Superman: American Alien #5 (variant cover) (2016)
- Scooby Apocalypse #5 (variant cover) (2016)
- Flash Omnibus By Francis Manapul & Brian Buccellato (new cover) (2016)
- Kamandi Challenge #10 (2017)
- Hal Jordan And The Green Lantern Corps #33-36 (2017-2018)
- Action Comics (Vol. 3) #992 (2017), #993-994 (variant covers) (2017), #1001-1006 (variant covers) (2018-2019), #1009-1011 (2019)
- Teen Titans (Vol. 6) #15 (2017)
- Super Sons #11 (2017)
- Justice League/Aquaman: Drowned Earth #1 (variant cover) (2018)
- Flash Starting Line DC Essential Edition (new cover) (2018)
- Titans (Vol. 3) #36 (variant cover) (2019)
- Green Arrow (Vol. 7) #49 (variant cover) (2019)
- Justice League (Vol. 4) #18 (2019), #26 (2019)
- Flash (Vol. 5) #75 (Year of the Villain variant cover) (2019)

==== Devil's Due Publishing ====
- G.I. Joe #16 (Devil's Due, 2003)
- G.I. Joe: Reborn #1 (Devil's Due, 2004)
- G.I. Joe Declassified #1-3 (Devil's Due, 2006)
- G.I. Joe Dreadnoks: Declassified #1-3 (Devil's Due, 2006–2007)
- G.I. Joe Special Missions: Antarctica #1 (Devil's Due, 2006)

==== Image Comics ====
- Witchblade #43, 55-56, 61, 62-65, 68-70, 73, 84 (Top Cow, 2000–2005)
- The Darkness #2 (Top Cow, 2003)
- Masters of the Universe (Vol. 3) #2 (variant cover) (2002)
- G.I. Joe: Frontline #9-14 (2003)
- Pilot Season: The Necromancer #1 (Top Cow, 2007)
- Sons Of The Devil #5 (variant cover) (2015)

=== Writer ===
==== DC Comics ====
- Detective Comics: Futures End #1 (2014)
- Justice League: The Darkseid War Superman #1 (2015)
- Justice League: The Darkseid War Lex Luthor #1 (2015)
- Trinity (Vol. 2) #1-6 (2016-2017), #9-11 (2017)

Preceded by John Layman	Detective Comics writer 2014 (with Brian Buccellato)	Succeeded by Benjamin Percy
Preceded by Benjamin Percy	Detective Comics writer 2014–2015 (with Brian Buccellato)	Succeeded by Peter Tomasi
