= Jason Fabok =

Canadian comic-book artist

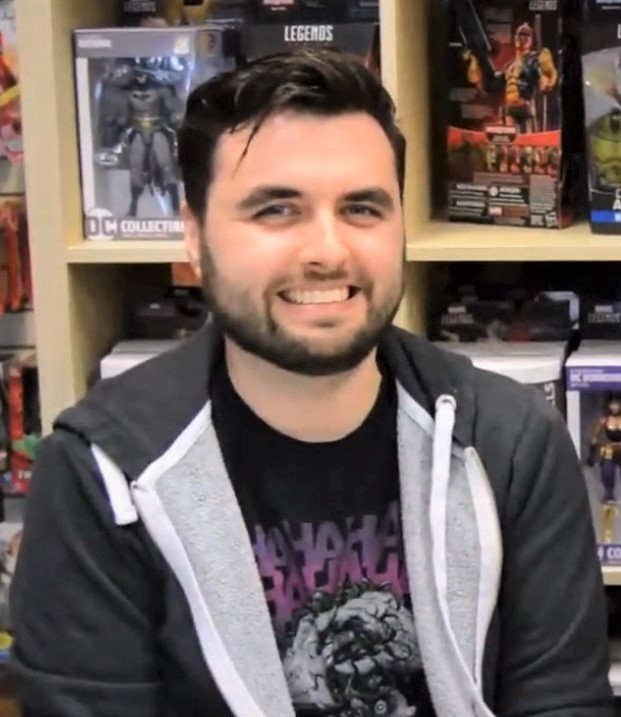
- Fabok in 2018
- Born: April 14, 1985 (age 41) Windsor, Ontario, Canada
- Areas: Penciller, Inker
- Notable works: Batman, Justice League, Detective Comics
- Awards: Eisner Award for Best Short Story

Jason Fabok (born April 14, 1985) is a Canadian comic-book artist. He has worked almost exclusively for DC Comics for the entirety of his career. His work has been featured in acclaimed series such as Batman, Detective Comics, Justice League, and the Eisner Award-winning Swamp Thing: The Talk of the Saints short story.

== Career ==
Fabok graduated from St. Clair College's Tradigital Animation program in 2007. He then attended the Word of Life Bible College in Owen Sound for a year, an experience that furthered his interest to pursue a career as a comic artist. After becoming aware that illustrator David Finch lived in his same town, Fabok sent him his portfolio. Finch agreed to mentor him and put him through a six-month-long "boot camp", teaching him everything from anatomy, to backgrounds and buildings. After six months Finch suggested Fabok sending his new portfolio to DC Comics.

His first published work were issues #70 and #71 of Superman/Batman. He subsequently penciled the full 2011 series of Aspen Comics's Soulfire, his only work outside of DC Comics to date. Fabok's big break in the industry happened when David Finch asked him if he was available to pencil issues #4 and #5 of Finch's own mini-series Batman: The Dark Knight. Within two weeks DC had offered Fabok a two-year exclusive contract.

After drawing the first annual for Scott Snyder's Batman, Fabok became the regular artist of the freshly relaunched New 52 run of Detective Comics with issue #13. He ended his stint on the book with oversized anniversary issue #27.

Fabok went on to draw several issues of weekly limited series Batman Eternal, among a team of pencilers.

Following a one-off drawing the annual for Justice League International, in 2014 he succeeded Doug Mahnke as main artist for Geoff Johns' Justice League, from issue #36 to issue #50. In 2016 he also penciled the first issue of Justice League vs. Suicide Squad.

The following year he illustrated both the Batman issues of the Batman/Flash crossover The Button, which served as a teaser for Geoff Johns' Watchmen sequel Doomsday Clock.

In 2018 Fabok provided art for Tom King's Swamp Thing one-shot The Talk of the Saints, featured in the Swamp Thing Winter Special, which went on to win an Eisner Award for Best Short Story. The same year he collaborated with other top DC artists on Brian Michael Bendis's The Man of Steel mini-series, which served as the prelude for Bendis's Superman relaunch. He reunited with writer Geoff Johns for the three-issue prestige-format mini-series Batman: Three Jokers, released in August 2020.

On October 12, 2023, Fabok and a group of colleagues announced at the New York Comic Con that they were forming a cooperative media company called Ghost Machine, which would publish creator-owned comics, and allow the participating creators to benefit from the development of their intellectual properties. The company publishes its books through Image Comics, and its other founding creators include Geoff Johns, Brad Meltzer, Gary Frank, Bryan Hitch, Francis Manapul, and Peter J. Tomasi, all of whom would produce comics work exclusively through that company. Fabok's inaugural work for the company would be Rook: Exodus, a series written by Johns, which is described by Ghost Machine as a "sprawling sci-fi epic which takes place in the far future, on a world where every aspect of nature is controlled by humanity". The story centers upon a struggling farmer who must deal with problems that include winged scavengers who plague his crops. The farmer is given a second chance when he becomes one of the "Wardens", for which he takes on the name Rook, and must decide whether to flee the planet before its destruction or fight to save it. A conceit of the book's premise is the helmet donned by the farmer, whose face resembles that of a bird, and gives him the ability to "connect" with birds, which he can employ as his spies and as a weapon.

== Bibliography ==
Image comics

-Ghost machine

=== DC Comics ===
- Superman/Batman #70–71 (art, with writer Joe Casey, 2010)
- Batman: The Dark Knight #4–5 (art, with writer David Finch, 2011)
- Batman (Vol. 2) Annual #1 (art, with writers Scott Snyder and James Tynion IV, 2012)
- Justice League International (Vol. 3) Annual #1 (art, with writers Geoff Johns and Dan DiDio, 2012)
- Detective Comics #13–20, 22–25, 27 (art, with writer John Layman, 2012–14)
- Batman Eternal #1–3, 14, 21, 32–33 (art, with various writers, 2014)
- Justice League (Vol. 2) #36–44, 47–50 (art, with writer Geoff Johns, 2014–16)
- Justice League vs. Suicide Squad #1 (art, with writer Joshua Williamson, 2016)
- Batman (Vol. 3) #21–22 (art, with writers Tom King and Joshua Williamson, 2017)
- Swamp Thing Winter Special #1 (art, with writer Tom King, 2018)
- The Man of Steel #1–6 (art, among other artists, with writer Brian Michael Bendis, 2018)
- Batman: Three Jokers #1–3 (art, with writer Geoff Johns, 2020)

=== Aspen Comics ===
- Soulfire (Vol. 3) #0–8 (art, with writer J.T. Krul, 2011–12)
