= Ivan Reis =

Brazilian comics artist (born 1976)

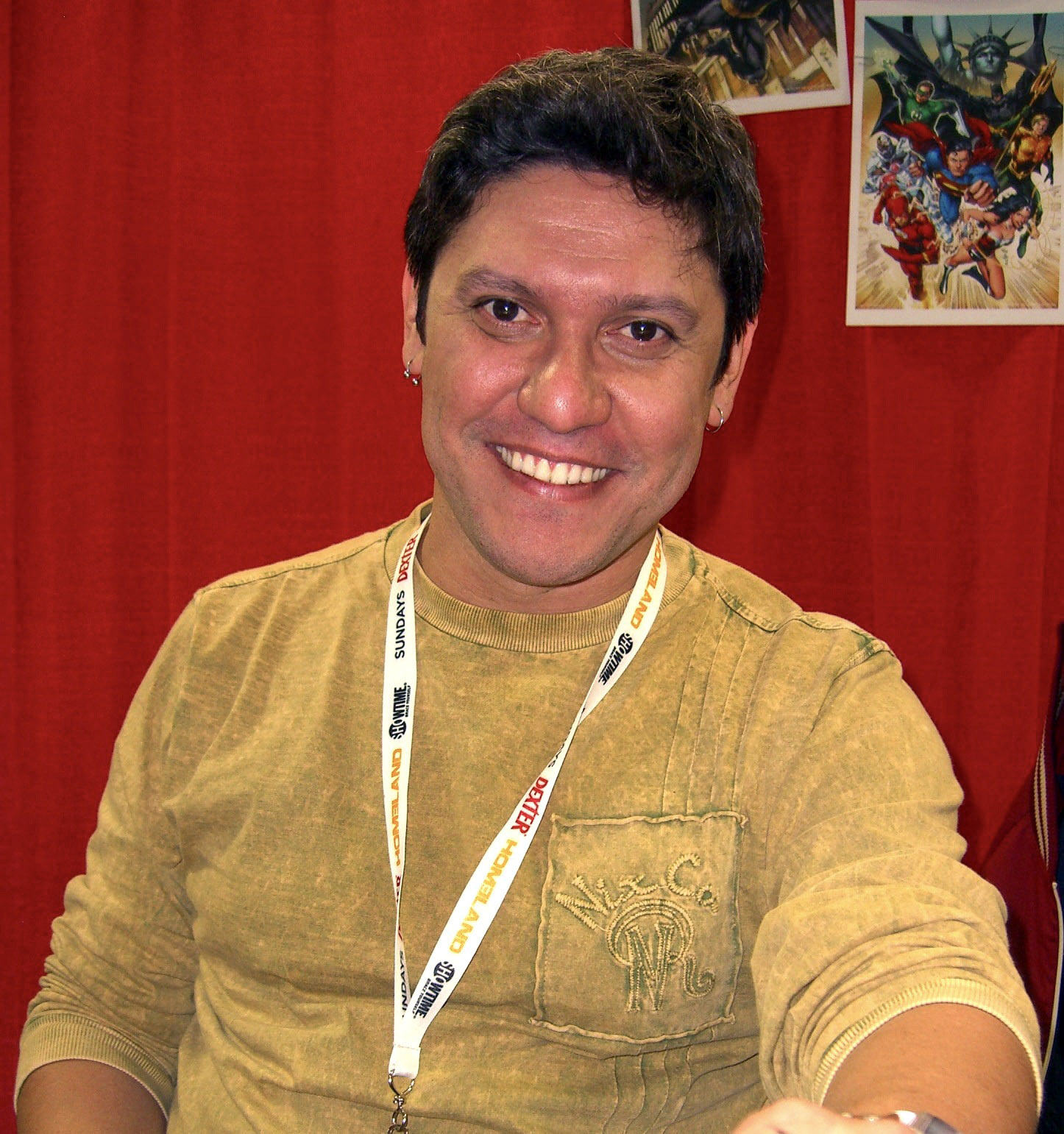
- Reis at the 2012 New York Comic Con
- Born: 1976 (age 49–50)
- Area: Penciller
- Notable works: Action Comics; Aquaman vol. 7 Blackest Night; Brightest Day; Ghost; Green Lantern vol. 4 Justice League; Rann–Thanagar War; Avengers Icons: The Vision; Captain Marvel

Ivan Reis (born 1976) is a Brazilian comics artist. He is known for his work on comic books such as Dark Horse Comics' Ghost, Marvel Comics' Captain Marvel and Avengers Icons: The Vision and DC Comics' Action Comics, Green Lantern and Aquaman series. According to collaborator Geoff Johns, Reis's drawing style resembles those of Alan Davis and Neal Adams.

== Career ==
For three years, Reis worked for Maurício de Sousa in Brazil. He began his international career for Dark Horse Comics working on Ghost, starting with issue #17 and acting as regular artist until the series concluded with issue #36. Other work for Dark Horse included The Mask, Time Cop, and Xena. He later worked for Lightning Comics.

At Vertigo, he pencilled an issue of Grant Morrison's The Invisibles. He became better known for Lady Death at Chaos! and CrossGen. At Marvel Comics, Reis worked on The Thing & She-Hulk: The Long Night, Avengers Icons: Vision, Captain Marvel, Iron Man, Defenders, and The Avengers.

Since 2004, Reis has worked for DC Comics on Action Comics, Teen Titans, Rann–Thanagar War, Superman, and Infinite Crisis. Reis started pencilling Green Lantern vol. 4 with issue #10 (May 2006). Reis left Green Lantern after issue #38 (March 2009) to draw the Blackest Night limited series (June 2009 – May 2010) and its follow-up limited series Brightest Day (July 2010 – June 2011). Reis was the regular penciller of writer Geoff Johns's run on Aquaman vol. 7, which premiered in September 2011. Reis drew it for the first 13 issues before moving to Justice League where he replaced Jim Lee. Johns and Reis introduced the Crime Syndicate of America into the New 52 continuity in Justice League #23 (Oct. 2013). Reis drew the first issue of Grant Morrison's The Multiversity in 2014. Reis drew the first issue of Brian Michael Bendis's The Man of Steel limited series and collaborated with Bendis on the relaunched Superman ongoing series in 2018.

On 1 December 2023, Reis was announced to be the tenth creator to join Ghost Machine, a cooperative media company, whose formation had been announced in October at the New York Comic Con, which would publish creator-owned comics through Image Comics. Reis would reunite with Johns on the horror title Hyde Street, which Image Comics described as combining "Blackest Night's fantastic scope with Twilight Zone's thought-provoking drama." Reis illustrated variant covers for Ghost Machine #1, an anthology ashcan comic published in January 2024, that would introduce Ghost Machine's four shared universes, including Hyde Street. The Hyde Street series would debut later that year. On 3 December, Reis confirmed on his Instagram page that he was leaving DC Comics, after a 20 year stint with the publisher.

== Bibliography ==
=== Chaos! Comics ===
- Lady Death:
  - Alive #2 (with Brian Pulido, 2001)
  - Dark Alliance #1–3 (with writer John Ostrander, 2002)
  - Jade #1 (with writer Brian Augustyn, 2002)
  - Judgement War #3 (with writers Brian Pulido and Len Kaminski, 2000)
  - Last Rites #4 (with writer John Ostrander, 2002)
  - The Rapture #2–3 (with writers Brian Pulido and Len Kaminski, 1999)

=== CrossGen ===
- Crux #21 (2003)
- Lady Death: A Medieval Tale #1–6 (with writer Brian Pulido, 2003)

=== Dark Horse Comics ===
- Ghost #17–25, 28–31, 33–36 (1996–98)
- Xena: Warrior Princess #3 (with Mike Deodato) (1999)

=== DC Comics ===
- Action Comics (Lana Lang) #812; (Superman) #813–819, 822–825 (with writer Chuck Austen, 2004–05)
- Aquaman, vol. 7, #1–13, #0 (with writer Geoff Johns, 2011–12)
- Batman, vol. 3, #6 (2016)
- Blackest Night, miniseries, #0–8 (with writer Geoff Johns, 2009–10)
- Blackest Night: Tales of the Corps, miniseries, #3 (with writer Geoff Johns, 2009)
- Brightest Day #1–14, 16–24 (with writers Geoff Johns and Peter Tomasi, among other artists, 2010–11)
- Countdown to Infinite Crisis #1 (with writer Geoff Johns, 2005)
- Cyborg #1–6 (with writer David F. Walker, 2015–16)
- DC Comics – The New 52 FCBD Special Edition #1 (among other artists, 2012)
- DC Comics: The New 52 Zero Omnibus (cover art, 2012)
- DC Universe #0 (among other artists) (2008)
- DC Universe: Rebirth #1 (among other artists; and variant cover artist first printing, 2016)
- DCU Holiday Special #1 (among other artists) (2009)
- 52 #22 (Green Lantern backup story, with writer Mark Waid, 2006); #51 (Justice League backup story, with writer Mark Waid, 2007)
- Detective Comics, vol. 2, #1047–1050, 1059–1061, 1966–1068 (2022–23)
- Green Lantern, vol. 4, #10–17, 21–25, 29–38, Super Spectacular (with writer Geoff Johns, 2006–11)
- Infinite Crisis, miniseries, #4–7 (among other artists) (2005–06)
- Infinite Crisis Special: Rann–Thanagar War #1 (with writer Dave Gibbons, 2006)
- Justice League, vol. 2, #8, 12, 15–17, 19, 22–24, 26–28, 30, 35 (with writer Geoff Johns, 2012–14)
- Justice League of America, vol. 4, #25 (with writer Dwayne McDuffie, among other artists, 2008)
- Justice League of America, vol. 5, #1, 4, 12–14, 17 (2017)
- Justice League of America: Rebirth #1 (2017)
- Justice League of America: The Atom - Rebirth #1 (cover art, 2017)
- Justice League of America: Vixen - Rebirth #1 (cover art, 2017)
- Justice League of America: The Ray - Rebirth #1 (cover art, 2017)
- Justice League of America: Killer Frost- Rebirth #1 (cover art, 2017)
- Kamandi Challenge #5 (with writer Bill Willingham, 2017)
- The Man of Steel, miniseries, #1 (with writer Brian Michael Bendis, 2018)
- The Multiversity #1–2 (with writer Grant Morrison, 2014–15)
- Rann–Thanagar War miniseries, #1–6, Special #1 (with writer Dave Gibbons, 2005–06)
- Superman, vol. 2, #223 (with writer Mark Verheiden, 2006)
- Superman, vol. 4, #14 (2017)
- Superman, vol. 5, #1–15, 18-21, 25-28 (2018-2020)
- Superman/Batman: Secret Files 2003 (with writer Geoff Johns)
- Teen Titans/Outsiders Secret Files 2003 (with writer Geoff Johns)
- Teen Titans/Legion Special #1 (with writers Geoff Johns and Mark Waid, 2004)
- Untold Tales of Blackest Night #1 (among other artists) (2010)

==== Vertigo ====
- The Invisibles, vol. 2, #18 (with writer Grant Morrison, 2000)

==== WildStorm ====
- The Authority vol. 3 #9 (backup story, with writer Christos Gage, 2009)
- WildCATS, vol. 2, #9 (backup story, with writer Christos Cage, 2009)

=== Image Comics ===
- Ghost Machine #1 (2024)

=== Marvel Comics ===
- The Avengers vol. 3 #52, 64 (with writer Geoff Johns, 2003), Annual 2001 (with writer Kurt Busiek, 2001)
- Avengers Icons: The Vision, miniseries, #1–4 (with writer Geoff Johns, 2002)
- Captain Marvel vol. 3 #4, 9–12 (with writer Peter David, 2003)
- Defenders vol. 2 #12 (backup story, with writers Kurt Busiek and Jo Duffy, 2002)
- Quicksilver #7, 9 (1998)
- The Supernaturals (with writer Marc Andreyko), five-issue limited series, 1998)
- The Thing/She-Hulk: The Long Night #1 (with writer Todd DeZago, 2002)

Preceded by Karl Kerschl	Action Comics artist 2004–2005	Succeeded by Ian Churchill
Preceded by Ethan Van Sciver	Green Lantern vol. 4 artist 2006–2009	Succeeded by Philip Tan
Preceded by n/a	Aquaman vol. 7 artist 2011–2012	Succeeded by Pere Perez
Preceded by n/a	Justice League of America vol. 5 artist 2017	Succeeded by Stefan Petrucha
