= Romics =

Coordinates: 41.806179°N 12.326409°E

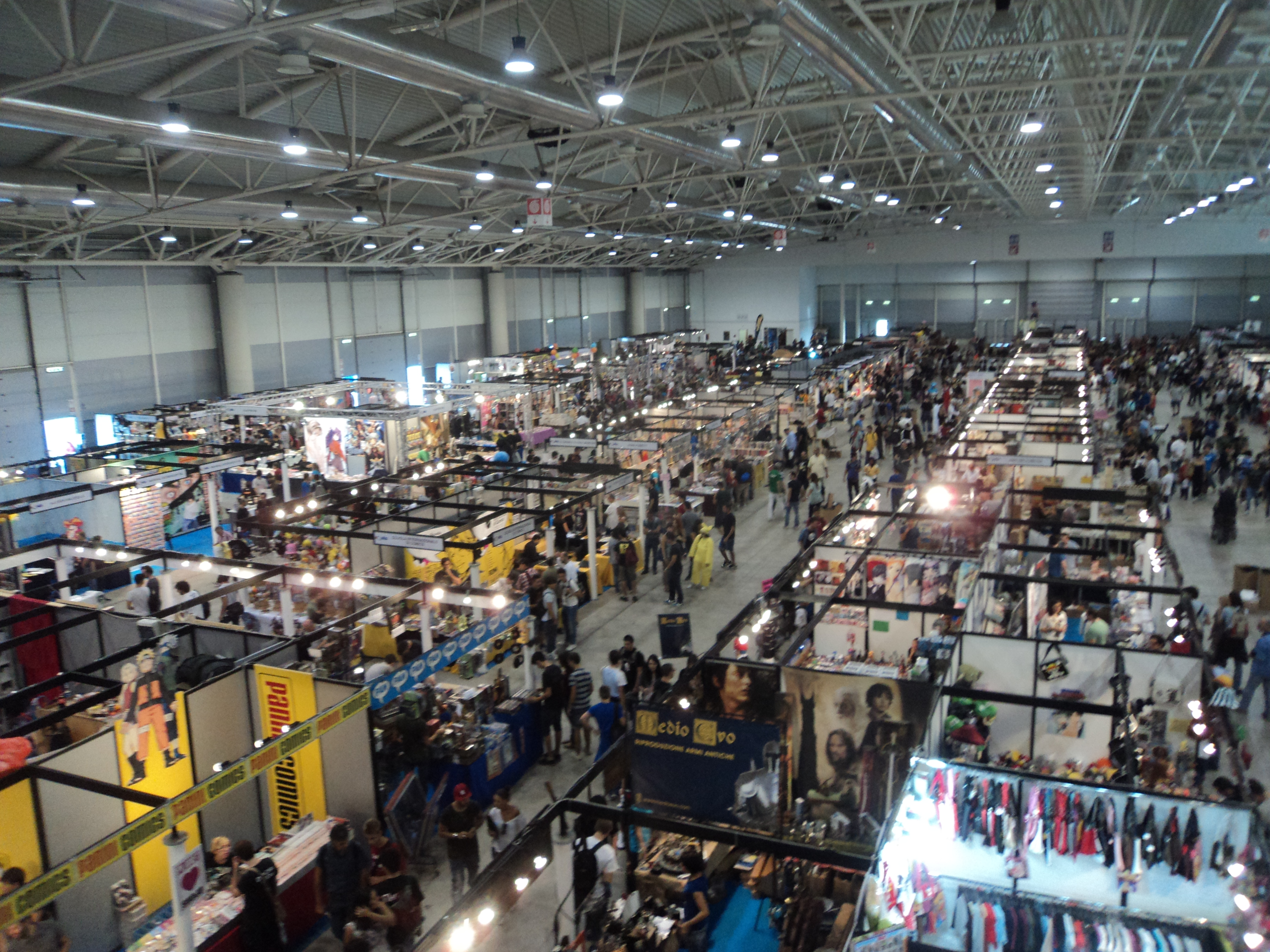
- Stands during Romics 2012
- Status: active
- Genre: Comics, Animation, Games, Movies, Role-playing games, Entertainment
- Dates: April (spring edition) and October (autumn edition)
- Venue: Fiera di Roma
- Location: Rome
- Country: Italy
- Inaugurated: 2001
- Attendance: 400,000
- Organizer: Fiera di Roma, Castelli Animati
- Website: romics.it

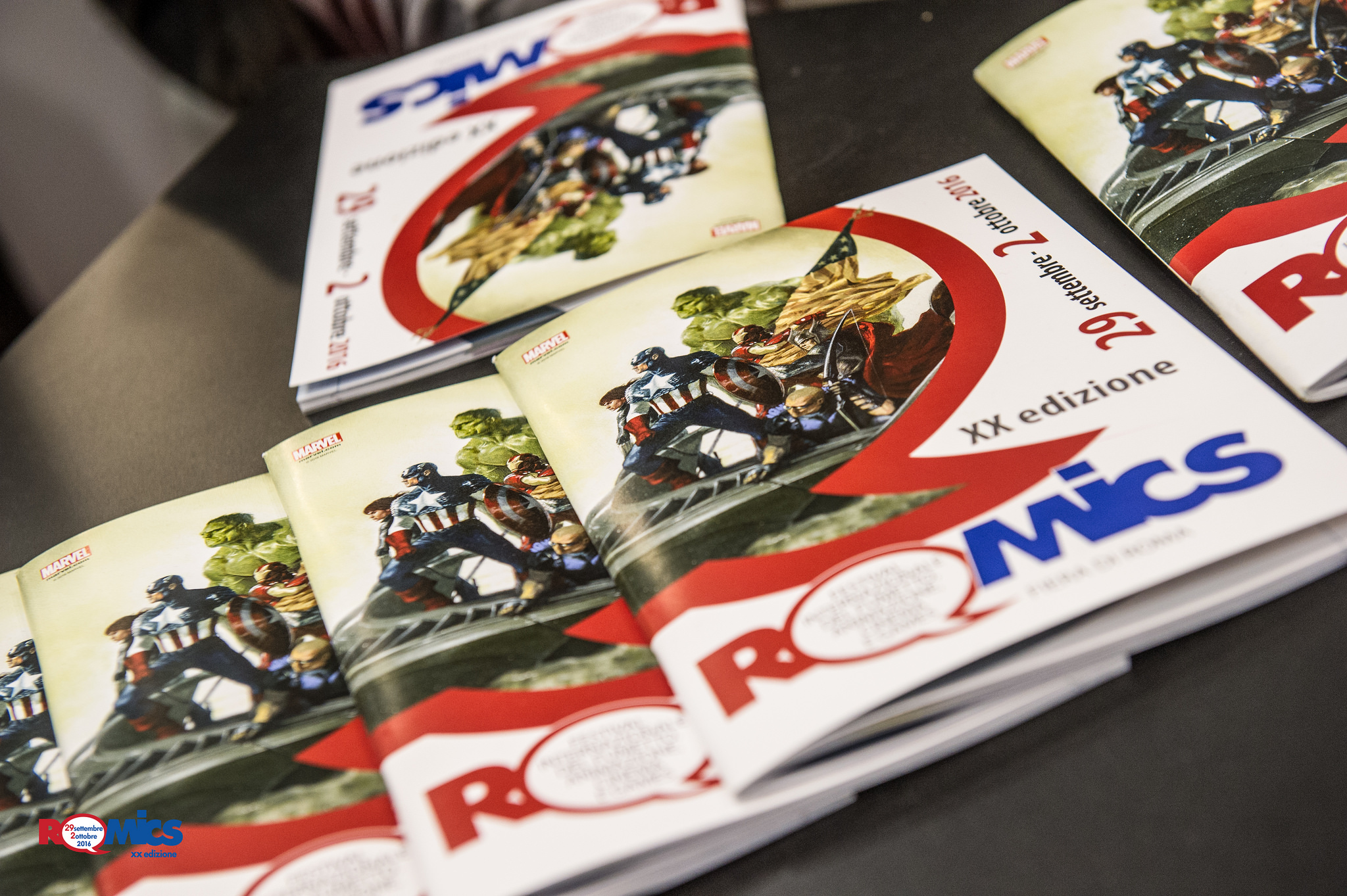
Event Catalog • 20th Edition

Romics is an international semiannual comic book, animation, and gaming convention in Rome, Italy. The event takes place over four days, usually during April for the spring edition, and October for the autumn one. Until the twelfth edition in 2012, it was held annually, most often in October. The event is held, for both its editions, in the Rome trade fair district.

Its annual attendance is generally around 400,000 visitors, the program is divided into over 100 presentations, simultaneously in the 5 pavilions and with over 250 exhibitors in an area of 70,000 m2.

As part of the event, the Grand Gala of Dubbing (Romics DD) is being held, an event dedicated to dubbing into Italian language. The Gala includes awards for dubbing in several categories.

== History ==
In 2001 was born in Rome, in the old exhibition center, in Via Cristoforo Colombo, the festival of comics, animation, and video games under the artistic direction of Luca Raffaelli who, after the tenth anniversary edition, abandoned the project due to differences with the production on the cultural identity of the event.

Both the 2020 and spring 2021 editions were canceled due to the COVID-19 pandemic.

== Golden Romics ==
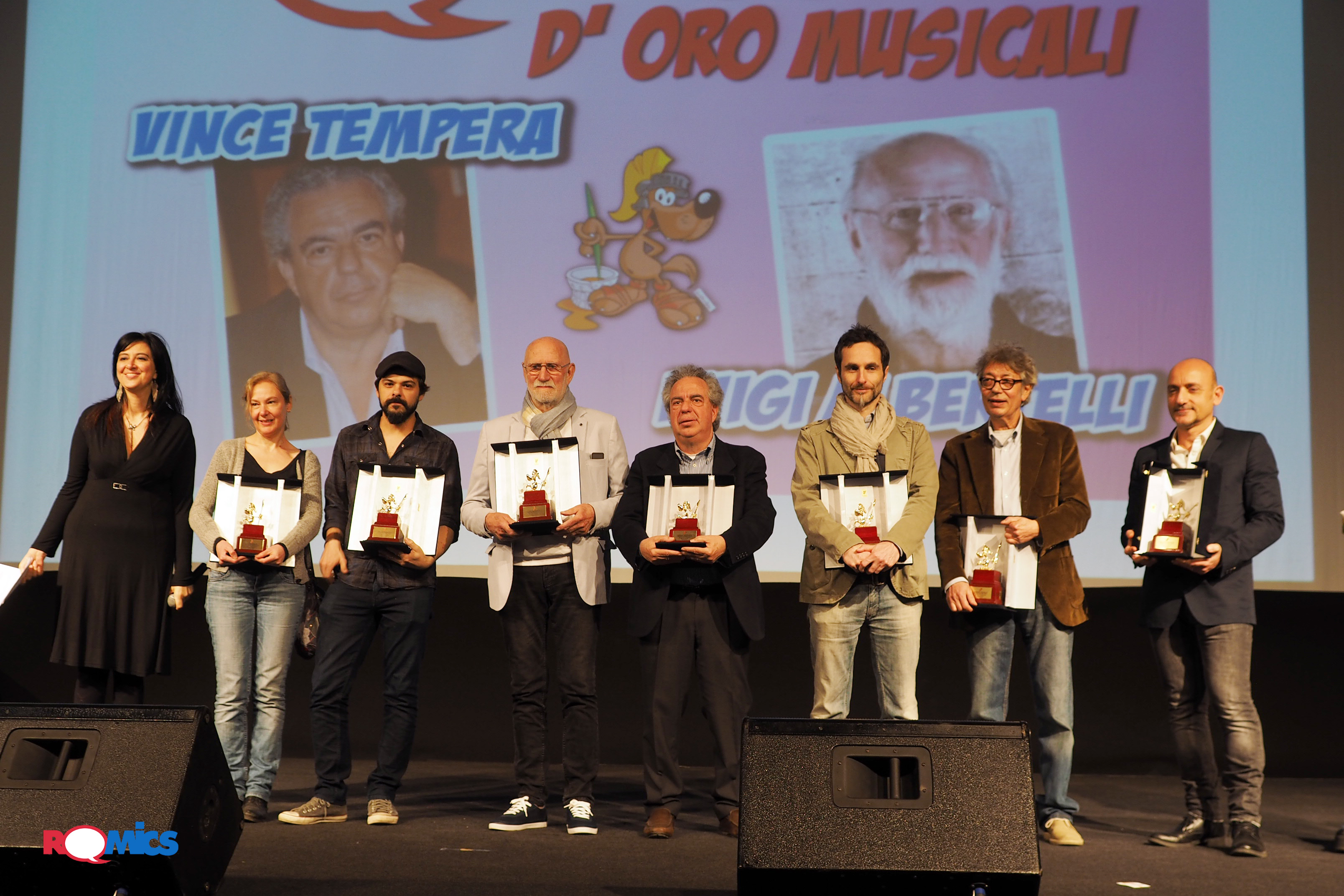
The Golden Romics of the 17th edition of the Festival

Every year, famous cartoonists are guests of the event and are awarded the "Romics d’Oro" (Golden Romics). Among the guests who attended: Albert Uderzo (Asterix), Milo Manara, Monkey Punch, creator of the comic Lupin the Third , Yoichi Takahashi, author of Captain Tsubasa; Sergio Bonelli, historic editor of Italian comics and screenwriter; Giancarlo Berardi, (Ken Parker, Julia); Eddie Campbell (From Hell); Alfredo Castelli (Martin Mystère); Vittorio Giardino (No Pasaran, Jonas Fink, Max Fridman); Carlos Gomez (Dago); Francisco Solano López, author of L'Eternauta; Giovanni Ticci (Tex); Robin Wood (Dago, Nippur de Lagash, Merlin, Savarese); Leo Ortolani (Rat-Man); Giorgio Cavazzano (Paperinika); Tsukasa Hōjō (Cat's Eyes, City Hunter); Massimo Rotundo (Tex).

== Editions ==
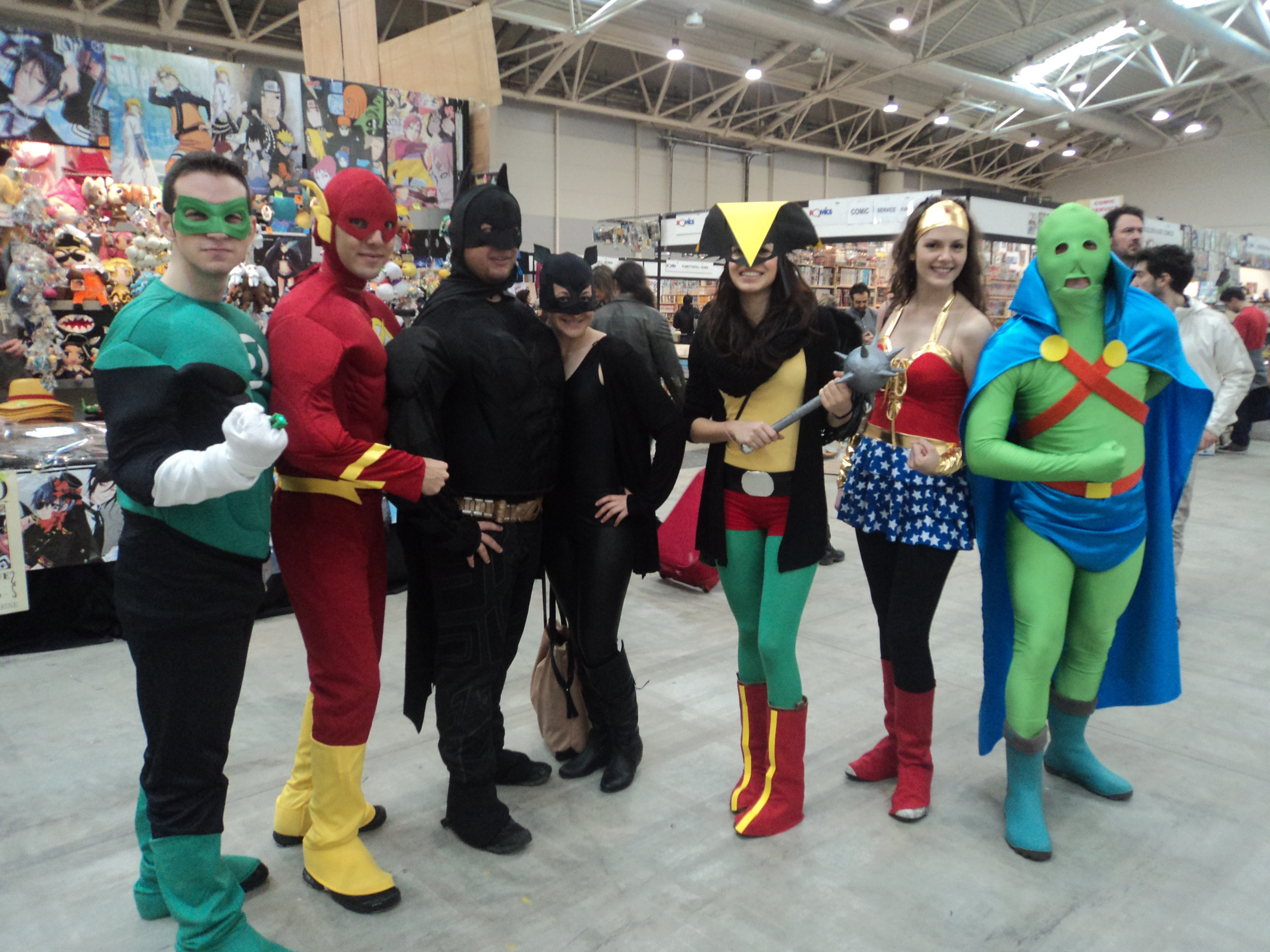
Cosplayers at Romics 2013

- First edition (22-23-24-25 November 2001)
- Second edition (3-4-5-6 October 2002)
- Third edition (2-3-4-5 October 2003)
- Fourth edition (7-8-9-10 October 2004)
- Fifth edition (2-3-4-5 October 2005)
- Sixth edition (5-6-7-8 October 2006)
- Seventh edition (4-5-6-7 October 2007)
- Eighth edition (2-3-4-5 October 2008)
- Ninth edition (8-9-10-11 October 2009)
- Tenth edition (30 September, 1-2-3 October 2010)
- Eleventh edition (29-30 September, 1–2 October 2011)
- Twelfth edition (27-28-29-30 September 2012)
- Thirteenth edition (4-5-6-7 April 2013)
- Fourteenth edition (3-4-5-6 October 2013)
- Fifteenth edition (3-4-5-6 April 2014)
- Sixteenth edition (2-3-4-5 October 2014)
- Seventeenth edition (9-10-11-12 April 2015)
- Eighteenth edition (1-2-3-4 October 2015)
- Nineteenth edition (7-8-9-10 April 2016)
- Twentieth edition (29-30 September, 1–2 October 2016)
- Twenty-first edition (2017)
- Twenty-second edition (2017)
- Twenty-third edition (2018)
- Twenty-fourth edition (2018)

== Gallery ==
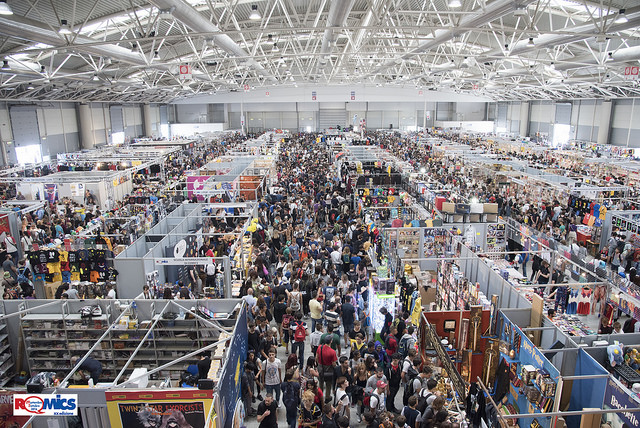
The Pala Comics

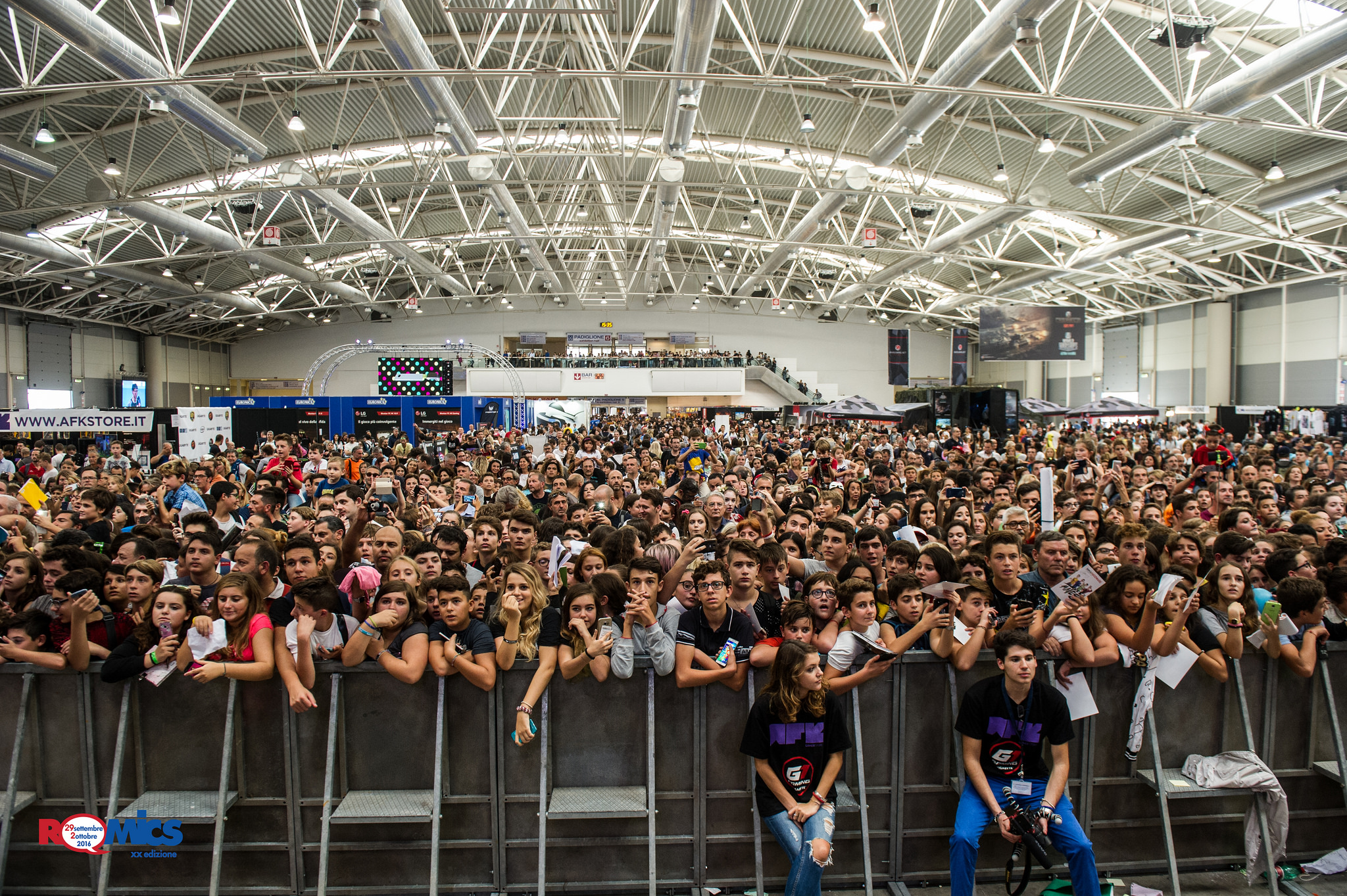
The Pala Games Romics

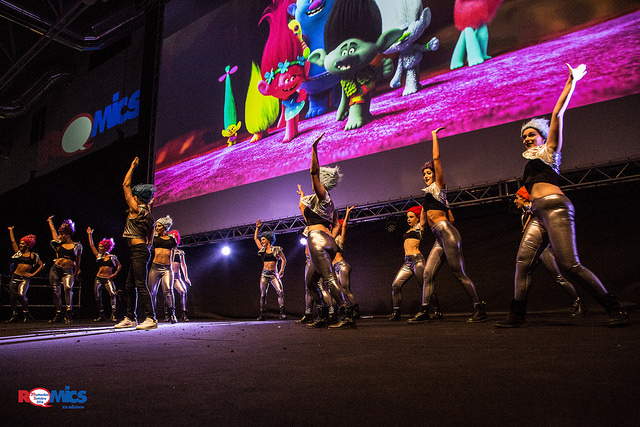

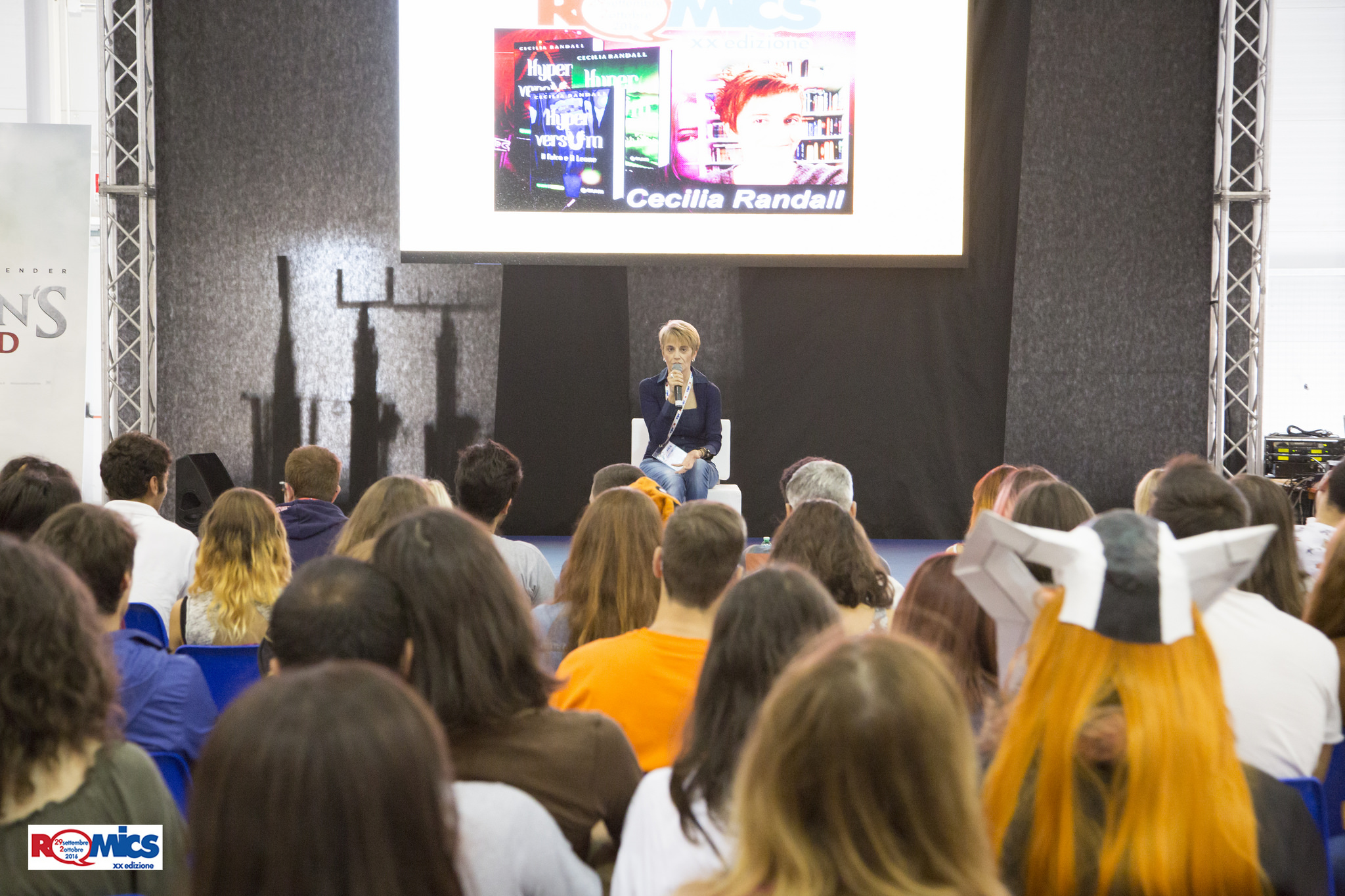
