= Bjarne Hansen (art director) =

Danish art director (born 1966)

Bjarne Hansen is a Danish art director, painter and colorist. He has worked as a freelance illustrator for magazines, commercials and books. He graduated from the Art and Craft School in Kolding in 1991. He has also worked in preproduction on the TV shows Troll Tales, Benjamin Blümchen, among other TV specials.

Bjarne has been a background painter for A-Film on the features Quest For Camelot and JungleJack 1 and 2. He also worked on a small primary color-script for the CGI animated feature Jungo Goes Bananas, another in the JungleJack series. He also worked as head of backgrounds on feature film Asterix and the Vikings.

He also worked in the American comics industry. He was nominated for a Wizard Fan Award in 1998. He has written and drawn graphic novels, illustrated a story by Morten Remar, and has worked coloring DC Comics including House of Secrets, The Light Brigade, Superman for All Seasons and A God Somewhere.

Bjarne recently has worked as art director on Sylvain Chomet’s film The Illusionist, focusing on color-script and background-painting. The film was nominated for an Academy Award for Best Animated Feature.

== Partial bibliography ==
=== Comics ===
- Superman for All Seasons (with writer Jeph Loeb and artist Tim Sale, 4-issue mini-series, DC Comics, September–December 1998)
- A God Somewhere (with writer John Arcudi and artist Peter Snejbjerg, OGN, Wildstorm, 2010)

== Awards and nominations ==
=== 1999 ===
Nominated for Best Colorist in the Eisner Award, for Superman For All Seasons.
