= Daniele Kong =

Daniele Kong (born 1982 in Macerata, Italy), pseudonym of Daniele Marzo, is an Italian comic book artist and illustrator. He gained recognition for his debut graphic novel Bestie in fuga (2024), which received critical acclaim and several prestigious awards.

== Early life and education ==
Kong grew up in the Roma 70 district of Rome. From a young age, he developed an interest in punk music and drawing. He graduated with a degree in architecture and, in 2013, moved to Berlin, where he worked as an architect while continuing to pursue his passion for illustration. In 2019, he returned to Rome and began working on his first graphic novel.

== Career ==
In 2024, Kong published Bestie in fuga through Coconino Press. The graphic novel is set in the 1950s on the fictional island of Dieci in the Tyrrhenian Sea. It narrates the story of a film crew arriving to shoot a movie about the life of Jesus, an event that disrupts the lives of local fishermen and reflects the tensions of Italy's post-war economic boom. The work was praised for its ensemble storytelling, use of various dialects, and black-and-white graphic style reminiscent of cinematic neorealism.

Bestie in fuga was selected from over 300 submissions by Coconino Press and became the only graphic novel among 80 titles proposed for the 2025 Premio Strega. That same year, it won the award for Best Italian Comic at Romics in Rome and the Micheluzzi Prize for Best Debut Work at the Naples Comicon.

== Works ==
- Bestie in fuga (2024), Coconino Press
