= Mark Chiarello =

American illustrator, art director and comic book editor

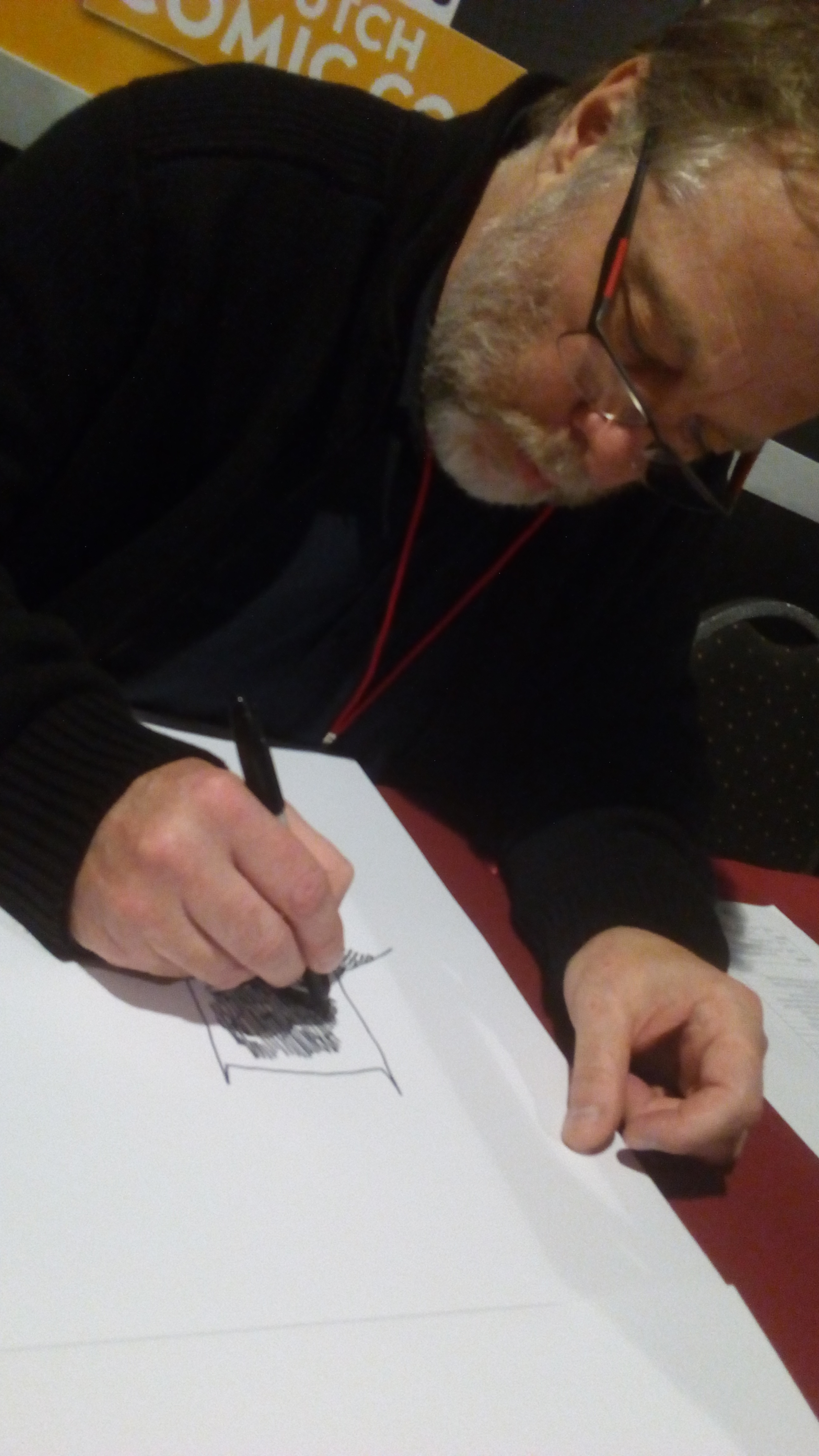
- Areas: Penciller, Editor

Mark Chiarello (born October 31, 1960) is an American illustrator, art director and comic book artist/editor/colorist.

== Career ==
After attending the Pratt Institute in the 1980's, Chiarello moved into the comic book industry.

As a comic book illustrator, Chiarello painted the Batman graphic novel Batman/Houdini: The Devil's Workshop, which earned him the 1993 National Cartoonists Society Award for Best Comic Book. He was the first colorist on Mike Mignola's creator-owned comic book, Hellboy (on Seed of Destruction).

Chiarello served as SVP, Art & Design Director for DC Comics for 27 years, before leaving the company in 2019.

As an editor for DC Comics, he created the Batman: Black and White, Solo, and Wednesday Comics, and was the editor of Darwyn Cooke’s series New Frontier. Chiarello was responsible for teaming up comics superstars Jim Lee and Jeph Loeb for their extremely successful run on the Batman series "Hush". Previously, Chiarello worked at Marvel Comics where he was assistant to Archie Goodwin.

As a book author and artist, Chiarello illustrated Star Wars: The New Essential Chronology and co-authored the book The DC Comics Guide to Coloring and Lettering Comics with Todd Klein.

In 2007 Chiarello painted sixty portraits for "Heroes of the Negro Leagues," a book on the history of Negro league baseball, written by Jack Morelli and published by Abrams Books. An article and interview featuring Chiarello's Negro league paintings appeared in the April 2008 issue of Juxtapoz Magazine.

In 2009 Chiarello painted the Spring/Summer advertising campaign for Carhartt fashion, and in 2015, he created a limited edition Mad Monster Party? poster/print for Mondo. In 2016, he also created artwork for Paul Simon’s 13th studio album Stranger to Stranger.

Chiarello illustrated the cover for the Blu-ray and DVD of Charlie Chaplin's The Circus, (2019 release) and Nicholas Ray’s They Live by Night, (2017 release), for the Criterion Collection.

In 2020, Chiarello self-published the book Baseball 100 with author Nel Yomtov, and in 2021, he illustrated his first children’s book, Alien to Zombie with author Kevin Somers.
