= Sergio Mulko =

Argentine comic artist

- Born: June 3, 1946; General Roca, Río Negro, Argentina
- Died: June 14, 2014
- Known for: Comic artist
- Notable work: Nippur de Lagash, Gilgamesh, el inmortal

Sergio Mulko (born June 3, 1946 - June 14, 2014) was an Argentine comic artist.

Mulko was born in General Roca, Río Negro. At a young age, he moved to Mar del Plata, from where he began publishing for the Columba Publishing house of Buenos Aires. He alternated the drawing of Nippur de Lagash with his creator, Lucho Olivera. Around the time of this cooperation was born Mulko's pseudonym Leo Gioser, who would write a series of scripts for Gilgamesh, el inmortal, also created by Olivera.

Mulko is the artist who has drawn more episodes of Nippur; more than 150 in two stages: between 1972 and 1976, and between 1988 and 1994. For many, he is the one who has given greater graphical quality to the series, after his creator, Olivera.

Also for Columba, he has drawn other series such as The Samurai, Espartaco, etc. With script of Morahín, he made one remembered version of Planet of the Apes. He has also collaborated with Editorial Record and Editorial García Ferré; as well as with a publishing house from Italy. Mulko had one short stage at TV animation for layoutman, in the Jaime Díaz Studios; but today he continues being an action comics artist.
