= Lucho Olivera =

Argentine comic book artist and writer

- Born: Ricardo Luis Olivera; 25 May 1942 Corrientes, Argentina
- Died: 11 November 2005 (aged 63) Buenos Aires
- Areas: Writer, penciller, inker
- Notable works: Nippur de Lagash; Gilgamesh the immortal

Ricardo Luis Olivera, better known as Lucho Olivera (1942–2005), was an Argentine comic book artist and writer. Olivera made himself a recognised name in his country, working many years in important Argentine comics, like the classic Nippur de Lagash, which he co-created with Robin Wood, and Gilgamesh the immortal, which he also created and is widely considered his "magnum opus".

== Biography ==
Olivera was born in Corrientes (capital city of Corrientes Province), where he studied drawing and painting with Rubén Vispo. At age 20 he moved to Buenos Aires City, where he published his first drawings in the magazines Vea y Lea and Leoplán while he studied at the Escuela Panamericana de Arte with Hugo Pratt and Alberto Breccia. His loaded and detailed style was influenced by Breccia but is also reminiscent of the work of John Buscema and Frank Frazetta. He soon attracted the attention of comics writer and publisher Héctor Germán Oesterheld, for whose magazines Frontera and Hora Cero Olivera would illustrate several covers during the late 1950s and early 60s. Soon he would also join the team for the magazine Misterix, where in 1964 Olivera published his first written work, Legión Extranjera ("Foreign Legion").

The jump to fame would come with Olivera's collaborations for the magazines of Editorial Columba, specifically in the main publication of Columba, the comics anthology magazine D'Artagnan, where in 1967 the first issue of the classic Nippur de Lagash ("Nippur from Lagash") would see the light and have an unexpected and overwhelming success; centered on the adventures of Nippur, a surly but all together wise and kind Sumerian exiled warrior (known in his time as "The Incorruptible"), Nippur... was loosely based on Mesopotamian mythological canon, and it was mainly the result of Olivera's friendship with the (at the time) young Paraguayan comics writer Robin Wood, with whom Olivera shared his fondness for sumerology, which contributed a narrative density to the story, incorporating historical material and developing a characteristic continuity to what was narrated, a feature uncommon for most of Argentine comics in that period. Nippur was a resounding success from the first chapters, which appeared in May 1967. The first seven episodes were unitary/self-contained stories, which narrated the exile of Nippur from his native city, Lagash, and the adoption of his new life as a wandering adventurer.

From 1972 Nippur de Lagash appeared in an independent comic-book format (instead of anthologies), where Olivera and Wood explored the character's youth and love stories, while the artist Sergio Mulko (an admirer of Olivera) relieved Olivera in the pages for the D'Artagnan separate stories of the adult Nippur. Of that comic book 27 episodes would appear; at the end of these, Olivera again alternated with Mulko in the drawing for D'Artagnan. Meanwhile, and since June 1969, Olivera had begun to draw and write his taking in a story about Sumerian mythological figure Gilgamesh. The result was Gilgamesh the immortal, which narrates the initial history of the Sumerian hero and then quickly veers to an environment of science fiction post-apocalyptic tales. Olivera's script, which carries a greater fantasy and moral ambiguity than that of Nippur de Lagash, allowed the artist to develop an uncharacteristically tenebrist style, which turned it into a cult comic.

In the following years, and after the retirement of José Luis Salinas, he would draw the scripts of Alfredo Julio Grassi for Dick el artillero ("Dick the artillery man"), a series of syndicated sports' themed comics for the King Features Syndicate, also published internationally in several newspapers. Since the 80s Nippur de Lagash panels would be at the hands of other cartoonists, especially Ricardo Villagrán. He also developed for the publishing house Ediciones Récord several science fiction stories during the 1970s (Galaxia Cero, Yo Ciborg, Planeta Rojo) and heroic adventure (Ronar). In all of them Olivera's use of black and shadows would again be the coprotagonist for every story, giving them a dye of noirish style, which was quite atypical for that genre. For a newspaper of Río Negro he also drew and wrote the comic Pepe Moreno in the late 90s, which tells of the adventures of a paleontologist concerned about the depredations of the national archaeological heritage.

Besides his work in comics, Olivera was always fond of painting and produced many artworks in his last years. Olivera became ill with cancer but continued working until before his death, which occurred in Buenos Aires on 11 November 2005.
