= Jorge Zaffino =

Argentinian comic book artist (1959–2002)

- Born: Jorge Rubén Zaffino; 13 June 1959
- Died: July 12, 2002 (aged 43)
- Areas: Penciller, Inker
- Notable works: Nippur de Lagash; Punisher; Batman: Black and White

Jorge Rubén Zaffino (1959–2002) was a comic book artist born in Argentina.

== Biography ==
Zaffino spent a lifetime working as an artist in and out of comics. At the age of 16, he began working as an unpaid apprentice at the comics studios of Ricardo and Enrique Villagran in Buenos Aires, where his father had requested that they take him on. Zaffino made himself a recognised name in his country, working many years in important Argentine comics, like Nippur de Lagash.

In the mid-1980s, Zaffino made a trip to the U.S. with Ricardo Villagran, who was working for Comico at the time. On that trip, Zaffino met comics writer Chuck Dixon, and together they produced Winter World, a three part series for Eclipse. They continued to collaborate on comics, producing the seminal Punisher graphic novels Kingdom Gone and Assassin's Guild, and a Savage Sword of Conan story titled The Horned God. During this time, Zaffino worked regularly with comics writer Dan Chichester on various comics, including Critical Mass, and Terror Inc.. He did relatively little work in the U.S. comics industry, where he is mostly known for his art in Punisher, Clive Barker's Hellraiser and The 'Nam for Marvel Comics. Zaffino’s last work in the US was a story written by Dixon for the 1996 Batman Black and White mini series. He continued working for the Argentine comic market, but focused on his work as a painter.

A follow-up to Winter World called Winter Sea was entirely written and drawn for Marvel Comics, but was never published due to changes of Marvel's policy on creator-owned books at the time. A third chapter of the Winter World saga was also planned, titled Winter War. In January 2010, a hardcover edition containing Winter World and Winter Sea was published through IDW Publishing.

Zaffino died on July 12, 2002, at the age of 43 of a heart attack in Buenos Aires, Argentina.

== Bibliography ==
Comics work includes:

- Nippur de Lagash: Los guiones continúan (The scripts continue), 1976 contribution to the storyline El Incorruptible (The Incorruptible) (1974/1978)
- Nippur de Lagash: Contributions to the storyline La saga de los hermanos tatuados (The tattooed brothers saga) (1980/1985)
- Gorak
- Kayan
- Wolf
- Troels
- The Punisher
- Punisher: War Zone
- The 'Nam 1986
- Punisher: Assassin's Guild 1988
- Winter World 1988
- Clive Barker's Hellraiser 1988
- "The Horned God", from The Savage Sword of Conan #162, 1989
- Seven Block 1990/2004
- Critical Mass 1990
- Punisher; Kingdom Gone 1990
- Hoover 1991/1998
- Terror Inc. 1992
- Batman: Black & White 1996
- Shadow Line Sage
