= Major Bummer =

Comic book series by DC Comics

- The cover of issue #11.

Publication information
- Publisher: DC Comics
- Schedule: Monthly
- Format: Ongoing series
- Genre: Humor/comedy, superhero
- Publication date: August 1997 – October 1998
- No. of issues: 15

Creative team
- Created by: John Arcudi; Doug Mahnke
- Written by: John Arcudi
- Penciller: Doug Mahnke
- Inker: Tom Nguyen
- Letterer: Willie Schubert
- Colorist(s): Carla Feeny; Allen Jamison
- Editor: Peter Tomasi

Major Bummer is a humorous comic book produced by DC Comics in the late 1990s. It was created by writer John Arcudi and artist Doug Mahnke. For the series's brief run, the main character was 19-year-old Lou Martin, who Arcudi described as "smart enough that he might be able to cure cancer if he applied himself, but he'd rather use his brain to try and steal cable".

Major Bummer was cancelled after issue #15 - "Sales were bad and there was just no way to keep this book going", wrote editor Peter Tomasi in the letter pages of the last issue.

== Concept and development ==
Creator John Arcudi developed the concept of the series in 1992 and pitched it to DC Comics under the title "Captain Slack-Ass". DC rejected this title and also insisted that the series be set in the mainstream DC Universe.

Arcudi and penciler Doug Mahnke, both of whom were in their 30s when the series was produced, admitted that they found it hard to empathize with a teenage slacker. Mahnke went so far as to visit malls and sketch passing teenagers just "to get reference".

== Plot synopsis ==
Two alien college students, Zinnak and Yoof, are doing their thesis on heroes in Earth culture. To further their study, they send through the mail EEMs or Extreme Enhancement Modules that, when opened, endow the recipient with superpowers.

Due to the incompetence of Yoof, an EEM is sent to Lou Martin, a slacker, instead of Martin Louis, an upwardly mobile young lawyer and philanthropist. Lou receives superhuman strength and intelligence. Unfortunately, because Lou is so lazy, he is only able to use his intelligence either subconsciously or during moments of extreme concentration. Despite this flaw, Lou was an erudite and intelligent individual already. Gaining powers is actually an inconvenience to him. Lou's EEM is designed to attract trouble and the other superhumans whom Martin would have chosen to lead.

The other "superheroes" are Val Andrist, the environmentalist daughter of an Ice Cream magnate who can fly; Francis Dutton, an aromatherapist hippie with a sonic scream; Lauren Isley, an elderly woman who can predict the future (but is so absent-minded she got confused with the past); a cat that became a giant when scared; and "Gecko", a nerdish man who can stick to walls.

EEMs were also gifted to a group of supervillains and attracted to one another in order to ensure battles would occur (e.g. the loser-turned-monster Nunzio, whom Lou brain-damaged via unintentional electrocution). Other stories involved a Nazi dinosaur from a parallel universe named Tyrannosaurus Reich, a demon-possessed toddler, carnivorous alien worms, an overly adoring fan of Lou's that tried to kill him to make him more famous, and an alien time traveler that destroyed time.

== Supervillains ==
- Tyrannosaurus Reich is a supervillain who was featured in Major Bummer #5. T. Reich was pulled to earth through a dimensional portal from a dimension inhabited by Nazi dinosaurs.
