= A God Somewhere =

2010 graphic novel by John Arcudi

- Cover to the first edition.
- Date: June 2010
- Page count: 194 pages
- Publisher: Wildstorm

Creative team
- Writer: John Arcudi
- Penciller: Peter Snejbjerg
- Letterer: Wes Abbott
- Colourist: Bjarne Hansen

Original publication
- Language: English
- ISBN: 978-1-4012-2683-1 (First ed); 978-1-4012-3246-7 (Second ed)

A God Somewhere is a 2010 graphic novel created by writer John Arcudi, artist Peter Snejbjerg, and colorist Bjarne Hansen. The novel was first published in one paperback volume by DC Comics' Wildstorm imprint. It tells the story of Eric Forster, the first human to develop superhuman abilities, through the eyes of his friends and family. Over time, Eric's powers cause him to become disconnected from and ruthless toward humanity, leading to a conflict with the US military. The story emphasizes violence and focuses on the ways people are affected by it. Critics gave the story generally positive reviews, but noted that the subject matter was cliché and sometimes found the use of flashbacks confusing.

== Development and publication ==
The concept began to develop when John Arcudi read Kenneth Brower's 1978 book The Starship and the Canoe, which documents the divergent lives of physicist Freeman Dyson and his son George. Arcudi applied ideas from it to superheroes, a staple of comic books for which he has little affection. He then pitched his story to DC Comics as "this is not the story about a god-like superman. This is the story about everybody else". He wanted to offer a counterpoint to most comics and action films that avoid showing how violence changes both the victim and the victimizer. He also wanted address certain racial, religious and cultural issues he felt were underrepresented in comics. Arcudi drew inspiration from the works of theologians St. Augustine, St. Thomas Aquinas, and Friedrich Nietzsche, and some elements of the plot were inspired by the story of King Saul.

The time from Arcudi's inception of the story to his final draft was about 18 months. It was initially crafted as a miniseries with editor Peter Tomasi for release through DC, but when Tomasi left the project it was repackaged as a graphic novel to be released through DC's Wildstorm imprint. The content itself was unchanged.

From the beginning, Arcudi wanted to work with artist Peter Snejbjerg and colorist Bjarne Hansen after seeing their work in DC's 2004 miniseries The Light Brigade, which was written by Tomasi. They had to decline the project when they were first asked because of other commitments, so other artists were considered. However, issues unrelated to the artwork caused production on the comic to be delayed until their schedules were clear. When discussing the story with them, Arcudi had specific ideas about Eric's appearance.

A God Somewhere was released to comic specialty shops and the book market on June 3, 2010. It was an unusual release for Wildstorm at the time, as the imprint had not released an original graphic novel in five years. It was advertised in the Diamond Distribution catalog with a three-page preview.

Critics typically praised the story, but sales were average at best. Initial orders were estimated to be around 2,600 copies, and reorders only raised the total sales to 3,500 by the end of the year. The lackluster performance may have been due in part to the $24.99 retail price, which was higher than average for a softcover graphic novel at the time. A second edition was released in late 2011, this time as part of DC's Vertigo imprint. A German language edition was later made available in Europe through Panini Comics.

In an interview given prior to publication, Arcudi said it was "hard to imagine revisiting" the story in a second volume or a prequel.

== Plot ==
In 1992, Sam Knowles is a new black student in a predominantly white high school. When he is attacked by other students, brothers Eric and Hugh Forster come to his rescue. The three form a strong, lasting friendship that is strained when Hugh marries Alma, a girl all three boys find attractive.

Years later, Eric's apartment building mysteriously explodes, but Eric is unharmed. Sam takes Eric to a hospital where they are found by Alma. She and Hugh had split up to search for Eric, but Eric does not hear her explanation and is hurt by Hugh's absence. They see on TV that people are still trapped in the apartment rubble, and Eric rushes out of the hospital to help them. Sam follows him but is left behind when Eric leaps into the air and flies away. Eric returns to his apartment and rescues multiple survivors using superhuman strength and senses. He is caught on film by news crews, becoming an overnight sensation.

Over the next few weeks, Eric uses his abilities to protect various people. He also becomes more religious, believing God is speaking through him. Sam uses his relationship with Eric to garner girls and career success in journalism. Hugh and Alma are upset by the sudden public attention and wish things would return to normal. They are also slightly afraid of what Eric has become. After a tense meeting with the President of the United States, Eric attacks his brother and rapes his sister-in-law. Hugh survives as a quadriplegic. The police arrive and Eric allows himself to be arrested.

When Sam visits Eric in jail, Eric claims to have been a god in another universe. Sam wants an explanation for Eric's actions, but Eric says Sam can never understand. Eric then escapes from his cell, murdering many guards and innocent bystanders.

During the next year, Eric leaves a path of destruction across the United States, killing any soldier or civilian he encounters. Sam is hired by a national magazine to travel with the military and document the effort to capture Eric. The military discovers Eric is vulnerable to lasers and is able to give him a mortal wound. Eric kills all the soldiers present and has a brief talk with Sam. Eric tries to explain his actions, but Sam does not understand. The Air Force arrives to bomb Eric, and Eric saves Sam's life by throwing him from the blast area. Eric mentally controls Sam's flight path, giving Sam a taste of what superpowers were like. Eric is killed by the bombs.

Sam becomes famous for the articles he writes about Eric, and his agent pushes him to write a book. Because his articles inspired a cult devoted to Eric, Sam declines to write anymore. He visits Hugh and Alma, learning Alma still suffers from posttraumatic stress disorder. Sam leaves, deciding to move on with his life.

== Reception ==
A God Somewhere debuted to mostly positive reviews from critics. Many of them noted that the premise and themes were common to the comic medium, and others drew specific comparisons to Doctor Manhattan from Watchmen, Miracleman and Kid Miracleman, and Superman: Secret Identity. Despite the "well-worn" premise, Multiversity Comics felt A God Somewhere excelled in the presentation of its "complex, layered, and dialogic" themes. One theme was how different people are changed by violence, which involved emphasizing violence without sensationalizing it. Another theme was the cultural definition of heroism, which is common across Arcudi's oeuvre. Comic Book Resources liked that Arcudi left Eric's motivations ambiguous, letting readers draw their own conclusions.

The relationships between the characters were frequently touched on by critics. The story is narrated in the past-tense by Sam, and Publishers Weekly felt this made Eric's development tragic rather than exciting. Comic Book Resources agreed, saying the changes he went through are surprising as they happen but seem inevitable afterward. Der Spiegel thought Arcudi handled the relationship between "unequal brothers" well, and cited A God Somewhere as proof that Arcudi is among the best writers in comics. That sentiment was shared by Seattle PI, who felt the believable characters set the work apart from other contemporary comics. The story includes a subplot focused on the racial tension caused by Sam's friendship with Eric, but it does not build to a conflict or affect the climax. Critics were torn on its inclusion, with Pop Matters and Multiversity Comics saying it gave the characters additional depth and The Outhousers seeing it as an odd choice to increase tension. The characterization of Alma was criticized by Pop Matters, who noted that her role is limited to an object of sexual desire.

Arcudi used minimal dialogue throughout the book, relying on Snejbjerg to convey important parts of the story through body language and facial expressions. This tactic was cause for criticism at certain points of the story, particularly flashbacks. The primary indication that the narrative has moved between time periods is the length of Eric's hair. The transitions were described as "jarring" but effective by The Outhousers and "confusing" by Multiversity Comics, who went on to call it "a novel idea that is ineffective in practice" because Eric does not appear in every flashback scene.
