= Batman Black and White =

Comic book limited series published by DC Comics

- Cover of Batman Black and White #1 (June 1996) by Jim Lee and Scott Williams.

Publication information
- Publisher: DC Comics
- Schedule: Monthly
- Title(s): Batman Black and White
- Formats: Limited series
- Genre: Superhero
- Number of issues: List: (vol. 1): 4 (vol. 4): 6 (vol. 5): 6
- Main character(s): Batman

Creative team
- Writer(s): List: (vol. 1) Ted McKeever Archie Goodwin Jan Strnad Chuck Dixon Neil Gaiman Andrew Helfer Denny O'Neil (vol. 4) Chip Kidd Maris Wicks John Arcudi Howard Mackie Dan Didio Jeff Lemire Michael Uslan Marv Wolfman Paul Dini Nathan Edmondson David Macho Ivan Brandon Keith Giffen Blair Butler Len Wein Jimmy Palmiotti Olly Moss
- Artist(s): List: (vol. 1) Ted McKeever Bruce Timm Joe Kubert Howard Chaykin José Muñoz Walt Simonson Richard Corben Kent Williams Jorge Zaffino Simon Bisley Klaus Janson Tanino Liberatore Matt Wagner Bill Sienkiewicz Teddy Kristiansen Brian Bolland Kevin Nowlan Gary Gianni Brian Stelfreeze Katsuhiro Otomo (vol. 4) Michael Cho Neal Adams Joe Quinones Sean Murphy Chris Samnee J. G. Jones Rafael Grampa Rafael Albuquerque Alex Niño Dave Bullock Lee Bermejo Damion Scott Riccardo Burchielli Rian Hughes Stéphane Roux Kenneth Rocafort Michael Allred Dustin Nguyen Rubén Pellejero Sean Galloway Paolo Rivera Javier Pulido Chris Weston Víctor Ibáñez Andrew Robinson Cliff Chiang Becky Cloonan Dave Taylor Adam Hughes Dave Johnson
- Editor(s): List: (vol. 1) Mark Chiarello Scott Peterson Darren Vincenzo (vol. 4) Mark Chiarello Camilla Zhang

Reprints
- Collected editions
- Volume 1: ISBN 1-4012-1589-0

Batman Black and White is a comic book limited series published by the comic book publishing company DC Comics featuring 8-page black and white Batman stories. Volumes 1, 4 and 5 of the series feature all-new stories (published in 1996, 2013–14, and 2020–21, respectively), while Vol. 2 and 3 contain stories from the back-up feature of the Batman: Gotham Knights comic book.

The series represents the first DC Comics work for future co-publisher Jim Lee, who drew the debut issue's cover, and the final DC work for Alex Toth, who drew the fourth issue's cover.

== Publication history ==
The origin of the series is told by editor Mark Chiarello in his introduction to the first collection, in which he writes about a dinner table-discussion with "a few famous comic-book artists", where they pondered the "desert island" question in terms of a single complete run of comics one would be happy to be stranded with. Ultimately, with "half a minute"'s thought, they "amazingly... all agreed, pound for pound, page for page" that the unequivocal choice was Warren Publishing's Creepy, a high point unmatched since "there has never been such a collection of stellar artists assembled under one banner publication" as in Creepy, whose pages were host to (among others) "Toth, Frazetta, Williamson, Torres, Colan, Ditko, Wrightson, Corben etc." Chiarello notes that "most of those stories" were written by one man: Archie Goodwin, described as "probably the very best editor ever to work in comics, probably the very best writer ever to work in comics" (and early mentor to Chiarello when the two worked at Marvel), whose Warren work was itself an "homage to the favorite comics of his youth, the E.C. line".

When Chiarello became a Batman editor "a whole bunch of years" later, he naturally "pitch[ed] the idea of a black and white anthology". Told by many colleagues that it would not sell - both because it was an anthology and because it was a black-and-white title, neither of which were purportedly widely liked by comics readers - the idea was green-lit, and Mike Carlin and Scott Peterson joined Chiarello to "make sure [he] didn't destroy the integrity of [Batman]".

Chiarello's initial thought, which was "to hire the very best artists in the business" led him and Peterson to assemble a wishlist of creators to contact. The series ultimately became "a creative and financial success" when the first four-issue volume was published between June and September 1996. There was also a free preview issued in 1996. Each of the four issues featured several self-contained short-stories, all written and drawn by a diverse group of comic artists and writers, most of whom had previously worked on Batman comics. Each story varied in theme, setting, and tone (depending on the creative team involved), offering multiple interpretations of Batman - and, in some cases, his supporting characters - usually by exploring their inner pathos and relationships. The series was the first DC Comics work for future Co-Publisher Jim Lee, who drew the debut issue's cover, and the final DC work for Alex Toth, who drew the fourth issue's cover.

== Contents and synopses ==
=== Volume 1 ===
This contains all-new material.

==== Issue #1 - June 1996 ====
- "Perpetual Mourning" - by Ted McKeever (this story was nominated for an Eisner Award)
  - Batman conducts an autopsy on a murder victim to help find her killer.
- "Two of a Kind" - by Bruce Timm
  - A Gotham news anchor comments on the biggest story of the year: a brilliant reconstructive surgeon, Marilyn Crane, has been able to repair the damage done to Two-Face, which cures him of his insanity and restores his Harvey Dent identity. Dent plans to marry Marilyn, but becomes nervous when he discovers that she has a twin sister named Madeline who is mentally unbalanced herself (Marilyn explains that she kept the information from him to prevent Two-Face's obsession with duality from resurfacing). Madeline and Harvey begin an affair, but when Dent decides to end the relationship and return to his wife-to-be, she is driven insane with rage and murders Marilyn. Harvey's therapy and surgery prevent him from tapping into his darker side, so he deliberately scars his face with hot coals, travels to Gotham's docks, and kills Madeline. He then waits for Batman to come and take him back to Arkham "with the rest of the crazy people", bitterly resigning himself to a life of madness as Two-Face.
- "The Hunt" - by Joe Kubert
  - A surreal take on Batman.
- "Petty Crimes" - by Howard Chaykin
  - Batman investigates a series of murders that are apparently motivated by rudeness and lack of respect for rules; among the victims are a supermarket cashier who let someone with more than ten items into the express lane and a security guard who locked a bank door at 2:57 as opposed to 3:00 PM. The Caped Crusader eventually tracks down the culprit—an undistinguished Gothamite who believes that he is doing the world a service by making people pay closer attention to their behavior. After Batman apprehends the criminal, he assures the Dark Knight that the two of them are actually performing the same work to save the city, and even offers to be a "sidekick" to the hero when he gets out of jail.
- "The Devil's Trumpet" - written by Archie Goodwin, art by José Antonio Muñoz
  - A jazz musician's search for a legendary trumpet leads him into the path of Batman.

==== Issue #2 - July 1996 ====
- "Legend" - by Walter Simonson
  - A mother tucking her son into bed tells the child an exciting story about a time long ago, when a masked man dressed as a bat fought criminals, villains, and all forms of evil to defend Gotham City. As her boy drifts off to sleep, the woman murmurs that the mysterious Batman swore to always be Gotham's protector, and hopes that he might resurface soon. It is then revealed that the story takes place in an Orwellian dystopia, with Gotham transformed into a police state—but the final panel depicts a familiar, bat-shaped shadow descending on an officer, suggesting that Batman has not abandoned his quest to save Gotham.
- "Monster Maker" - written by Jan Strnad, art by Richard Corben
  - Batman has a violent run-in with several 11-year-old black children, who he deems "monsters", before launching into an extended criticism of urban society.
- "Dead Boys Eyes" - by Kent Williams
  - Batman reaches out to the soul of Gotham during a near-death experience.
- "The Devil's Children" - written by Chuck Dixon, art by Jorge Zaffino
  - Batman investigates a series of mysterious gangland murders.
- "A Black & White World" - written by Neil Gaiman, art by Simon Bisley
  - Batman arrives at a strange office building, where a secretary tells him that they are "running behind" on scenes. It is revealed that all of Batman's comic book adventures are a staged affair much like a film, and that the characters are simply actors. The Caped Crusader enters the green room to prepare for his own work that day, where he chats with the Joker about the low quality of the writing. After finishing shooting for the day, Batman and the Joker head off to get lunch together, proving that their endless rivalry is simply an act for the audience.

==== Issue #3 - August 1996 ====
- "Good Evening, Midnight" - by Klaus Janson
  - Alfred reads a note Thomas Wayne had written long ago for his son.
- "In Dreams" - written by Andrew Helfer, art by Tanino Liberatore
  - A woman seeks help for her recurring nightmares involving Batman.
- "Heist" - by Matt Wagner
  - A gang of thieves are hunted by Batman during a botched home robbery.
- "Bent Twigs" - by Bill Sienkiewicz
  - Batman tries to mend the relationship between a single dad and his son.
- "A Slaying Song Tonight" - written by Dennis O'Neil, art by Teddy Kristiansen
  - Batman must protect a family from an unknown assassin during the holidays.

==== Issue #4 - September 1996 ====
- "An Innocent Guy" - by Brian Bolland
  - A young man in Gotham records a video describing his seemingly mundane life. However, he explains that in order to know he is truly a good person, he needs to perform a single horrific act and thus prove that he does not want to pursue a life of evil. The young man has decided that the only appropriate crime is murdering Batman, and outlines his plot to do so, explaining that, rather than Batman's many themed villains and rogues, he will simply shoot Batman in the head and vanish. After asserting his status as an "innocent guy", the young man swears that the Caped Crusader's murder will be his only villainous deed, and imagines his life going to back to its regular banality (this story would later be packaged with the 2008 re-release of Batman: The Killing Joke, with full coloring).
- "Monsters in the Closet" - written by Jan Strnad, art by Kevin Nowlan
  - Batman uncovers a mad scientist in Gotham and his abominable creations.
- "Heroes" - written by Archie Goodwin, art by Gary Gianni (this story won an Eisner Award)
  - A boy in World War II-era Gotham has a run-in with Batman and learns something about his own father in the process.
- "Leavetaking" - written by Dennis O'Neil, art by Brian Stelfreeze
  - During a near-death experience, Batman relives the night his family was murdered.
- "The Third Mask" - by Katsuhiro Otomo
  - Batman hunts a killer with multiple personalities and finds himself questioning his own identity.

==== Pin-ups ====
The first volume also included single-page pin-up renditions of the Caped Crusader by:

- Michael Allred
- Moebius
- Michael Wm. Kaluta
- Tony Salmons
- P. Craig Russell
- Marc Silvestri and Batt
- Alex Ross
- Neal Adams

=== Volume 2 ===
Collects back-up stories from Batman: Gotham Knights #1-16 with five new stories.

Contents

- "Case Study" - written by Paul Dini, art by Alex Ross (new material)
  - When the Joker is once again captured and sent back to Arkham Asylum, a doctor laments that all of his work has not pierced the Clown Prince of Crime's insanity. Another doctor offers up a report written years ago, which suggests that the Joker cannot be cured because he is not insane. The report outlines the Joker's history before his accident, and suggests that his "revenge" against Gotham for ruining him is to commit perfectly sane crimes under the guise of madness. The doctors are at first convinced, but Harleen Quinzel is then escorted past, commenting that she was the one who wrote the report prior to her personal sessions with the Joker. The doctors then wearily put the document away, realizing that though it is plausible, its origin renders it worthless - it is just another one of the Joker's sadistic jokes, left where it would someday be found, examined, and ultimately dismissed; a spot of hope that is crushed just as it shines brightest.
- "Bats, Man: Swarming Scourge of the Underworld" - written by Ty Templeton, art by Marie Severin (new material)
  - A parody.
- "A Matter of Trust" - written by Chris Claremont, art by Steve Rude and Mark Buckingham
- "Night After Night" - written by Kelley Puckett, art by Tim Sale (new material)
  - Bruce recalls the murder of his parents every night, and uses it as his drive for Batman to stop the Joker.
- "Fortunes" - written by Steven T. Seagle, art by Daniel Torres (new material)
- "To Become the Bat" - written by Warren Ellis, art by Jim Lee (originally published in Gotham Knights #1)
  - A great many experiences prepared Batman for his role as Gotham's protector: he has learned what sort of wounds different bullets make, he knows the distinctive aroma of every brand of aftershave, and he has discovered how every gadget he came in contact with in his youth works. All of it is essential to some cases, such as tracking down a pregnant prostitute's murderer - a political candidate.
- Untitled - by John Byrne (originally published in Gotham Knights #2)
  - Batman and Robin capture Thick and Thin Lyman and their gang, but neither they nor the police can get them to reveal any further information about a major shipment of drugs due in the city. The Lymans suddenly get bailed surprisingly easily, but find their every move dogged by either Batman or Robin, night and day. When they finally find themselves alone, Thick and Thin get to a meeting place as quickly as possible. However, once there, Thick reveals himself as Batman, but refuses to tell Thin when the switch took place.
- "Broken Nose" - by Paul Pope (originally published in Gotham Knights #3)
  - Alfred treats Bruce Wayne for the first broken nose he has sustained in his career as a crimefighter. It was given him by Mabuse, a criminal who designed a metallic suit of armor for himself (the Dark Knight derisively calls Mabuse a "geek in a trashcan"). After Alfred reassures him that a broken nose is something of a rite of passage for people who fight, Batman tracks Mabuse down to the scene of his next crime, fights him, and emerges victorious. Though Mabuse surrenders, Batman makes sure to provide a final bit of revenge against the villain by breaking his nose.
- "Greetings from Gotham City" - written by John Arcudi, art by Tony Salmons (originally published in Gotham Knights #4)
  - Ivan writes a postcard to his mother from Gotham City, detailing the amazing exploits of Batman in breaking up a gang of bank robbers. What he does not tell her is that he is one of the robbers and is writing from behind bars.
- "Hide and Seek" - written by Paul Levitz, art by Paul Rivoche (originally published in Gotham Knights #5)
  - At the scene of a train wreck which may well be the result of malice rather than an accident, Batman seizes on the smallest of clues to follow someone's trail through the train system and up into the light. Here he finds a small boy and reassures him that he is now safe, telling him that he knows what it is like to be young and lost.
- "The Riddle" - written by Walter Simonson, art by John Paul Leon (originally published in Gotham Knights #6)
  - A wealthy Gothamite with a huge collection of Lewis Carroll memorabilia has died. It is rumoured that in his possession he has Carroll's answer to the riddle "Why is a raven like a writing desk?"; This proves an irresistible target for the Riddler. He breaks into the house and negotiates his way through a maze of Alice's Adventures in Wonderland and Through the Looking-Glass-related animatronics, until he finds himself at the Mad Hatter's Tea Party, where the answer is tucked into the Hatter's hatband. The Riddler declares his triumph, but Batman then appears; to add insult to injury, he tells the Riddler that the "solution" he found is one that the Caped Crusader himself made up after discovering the real answer and taking it.
- "A Game of Bat and Rat" - written by John Arcudi, art by John Buscema (originally published in Gotham Knights #7)
  - A bunch of low-lifes think they witness the death of Batman, but a derelict claims that he saw Batman climb out of Gotham River and make his way to a warehouse, badly injured. They decide to make his death a reality, and find themselves under attack from an uninjured Batman. When their leader confronts the derelict, claiming that he deliberately set them up, the derelict admits it is true - he is Batman in disguise, after all.
- "Untitled" - written by Brian Azzarello, art by Eduardo Risso (originally published in Gotham Knights #8)
  - Batman confronts the serial killer Mr. Zsasz at the scene of his latest massacre, and the two exchange their views on power before Batman trusses Zsasz up and leaves him for the police.
- "Blackout" - written by Howard Chaykin, art by Jordi Bernet (an Elseworlds tale, occurring in 1943) (originally published in Gotham Knights #9)
  - Batman encounters Catwoman stealing from Albion Price, who, she claims, is a Nazi spy. Incredulous, Batman stakes Price out and discovers that she was telling the truth. They take him down together, but Batman still does not allow her to get away with the Nazi's stash of diamonds.
- "Guardian" - written by Alan Brennert, art by José Luis García-López (originally published in Gotham Knights #10)
  - While pursuing some arsonists, Batman encounters Green Lantern, who protected Gotham City during the 1940s and 1950s. He expresses concern at Batman's violent methods, warning him that he could go the way of the Reaper, but recognises the good he is doing. Batman is angry with Green Lantern for having turned his back on Gotham, but Green Lantern explains it is because he is afraid of the seemingly limitless potential of his power ring. The two of them come to a semi-understanding, and Green Lantern leaves Gotham in Batman's care.
- "Snow Job" - written by Bob Kanigher, art by Kyle Baker (originally published in Gotham Knights #11)
  - Batman dreams of going skiing with his son and rescuing a rich girl from her evil twin sister and assorted hired assassins.
- "The Black and White Bandit" - by Dave Gibbons (originally published in Gotham Knights #12)
  - A painter who has lost his sense of colour due to toxic paint fumes exacts his revenge in a series of black-and-white themed crimes. However, he is soon fooled by Batman and the police who set up the possibility of stealing the Milan Shroud. Despite disguising himself as a nun, he is apprehended and taken away in a panda car, a concept which reduces him to helpless laughter.
- "Funny Money" - written by Harlan Ellison, art by Gene Ha (originally published in Gotham Knights #13)
  - Commissioner Gordon asks Batman to have a few words in his office. Here he meets U.S. Treasury agents who inform him that not only has a consignment of "the paper from Dalton" (used to manufacture U.S. currency) been stolen, but a master engraver from Switzerland has just been arrested at Gotham Airport. Batman pays the engraver, Kaes Poppinger, a visit in his cell, and persuades him to assist the police. Some time later, Batman, disguised as engraver's assistant Dirks Baekert, accompanies Poppinger and the plates necessary to create money to the arranged meeting point, and from here watches the progress of the plates until they have been used to print the money. He, the police and the treasury crash the scene, but the counterfeiters are confident that as the money they have printed is indistinguishable from the real thing, there is no actual evidence that a crime has been committed. Batman then places one of the bills under a microscope, revealing that Poppinger secretly engraved an error in the plates, a miniature Batman and the words, "YOU*ARE*SO*BUSTED*".
- "The Bet" - written by Paul Dini, art by Ronnie Del Carmen (originally published in Gotham Knights #14)
  - Poison Ivy and Harley Quinn, incarcerated in adjoining cells in Arkham Asylum, challenge each other to a friendly $1.00 wager: which of them can get a kiss from every man in the building first? The competition starts with each kissing a passing guard, who Ivy infects with her pheromones; as the guard wanders the building, every man who smells the chemicals is entranced, and lines up outside of Ivy's cell for a kiss. Things look grim for Harley, and she becomes hysterical when the Joker enters, seemingly under Ivy's spell; however, as the Clown Prince of Crime kisses Ivy, he murmurs under his breath about how much he loves Harley. Ivy decides that Harley has won the bet, and pays her $1.00 - which Harley quickly gives, along with her own cash, to the Ventriloquist, the real power behind the Joker's sweet nothings.
- "Stormy Nether" - written by Tom Peyer, art by Gene Colan and Tom Palmer (originally published in Gotham Knights #15)
  - Batman and Prave (a child kidnapper) battle atop the Gotham rooftops. After falling, Prave finds himself relentlessly pursued by supernaturally invulnerable Batmen everywhere he goes. Elsewhere, Batman and a policeman contemplate Prave's dead body and wonder whether he got what he deserved.
- "The Bat no More...?" - written by Alan Grant, art by Enrique Breccia (originally published in Gotham Knights #16)
  - A derelict tells a tale of Batman in a Gotham City bar. He saw the vigilante confront the Scarecrow and then become increasingly paranoid at the sight of any of his equipment, somehow having developed a fear of bats. The Scarecrow then talks to this man, wanting to know all the details, but is himself sprayed with a gas that gives him a fear of his own books - it is Batman. The two of them then face each other, to see who will give in first in revealing their own anti-toxin - will Batman cave in to a fear of the dark, or the Scarecrow to a fear of words.

=== Volume 3 ===
Collects back-up stories from Batman: Gotham Knights #17-49 (mostly edited by Mark Chiarello, Bob Schreck and Michael Wright).

Contents

- "A Moment in the Light" - written by Joe Kelly, art by Aaron Wiesenfeld (originally published in Gotham Knights #17)
  - Batman encounters Mr. Zsasz in a junkyard, where the serial killer has imprisoned several kidnapped children. As the two battle, the scene begins to fade, revealing it to be a memory that Bruce Wayne is using during a meditation session. Though he claims that these sessions are simply to help him relax, he uses the techniques he learns as Batman to help increase his focus, and puts his skills to the test by analyzing evidence while listening to the laughter of children, driving himself to stop Zsasz and all other criminals.
- "Fat City" - plot and script by Mick McMahon and Dave Gibbons, art by Mick McMahon (originally published in Gotham Knights #18)
  - A monster made of grease is brought to life in a freak accident in Gotham's sewers, and begins to kill people by sucking all of the fat from their bodies. Gotham's citizens begin a fitness craze in an attempt to protect themselves, but the beast is not thwarted, and even the mayor is murdered. Eventually, Batman calls upon an odd ally to help him defeat the monster—Chloe Willow, "Gotham's fattest woman", whose noble self-sacrifice proves that heroes come in all shapes and sizes.
- "The Call" - written by Mark Schultz, art by Claudio Castellini (originally published in Gotham Knights #19)
  - Batman meticulously prepares for a raid on a party being held by a group of Mafia criminals, analyzing every detail and possibility in advance. However, his careful planning is all for naught when a small-time crook reveals a hidden gun, which he blindly fires; the bullet strikes an innocent young woman in the throat, and Batman must halt his crime-stopping to save her. With no time to bring the woman to a hospital, the Caped Crusader uses a special signal to summon Superman. As the Man of Steel uses his incredible powers to save the girl's life, he and Bruce have a discussion about their respective methods of heroism. They eventually realize that while incredibly different, they are both dedicated to helping as many people as possible, and that the world desperately needs each of them.
- "The Lesson" - plot and script by Julius Schwartz and Dan Raspler, art by Christian Alamy (originally published in Gotham Knights #20)
  - Cleverly juxtaposing the stories of Dick Grayson and young Bruce Wayne, the youthful central figure is reassured by the theory of Batman and led to conquer his fears, mask his pain and project a face for the rest of the world to see for the first - but never the last - time.
- "Day & Night in Black & White" - written by Mike Carlin, art by Dan DeCarlo and Terry Austin (originally published in Gotham Knights #21)
  - Day contrasts starkly with night in Gotham City as Barbara Gordon and Pamela Isley's daytime routine is mirrored in twisted fashion by their respective nighttime pursuits as Batgirl defeating Poison Ivy. Note: Listed on the contents page of Black and White Volume 2 as "Day & Nite" in "Black & White".
- The Bottom Line" - written by Michael Golden, art by Jason Pearson (originally published in Gotham Knights #22)
  - In this almost wordless comic, a group of thugs employed by the Joker has been tasked with stealing a small suitcase. Batman pursues them and snatches the bag for himself, leading to an intense game of cat-and-mouse. The struggle ends with Batman throwing the suitcase into the air—where it explodes, revealing that the apparent loot was actually a bomb which the Joker planned to use to kill both his henchmen and the Caped Crusader.
- "Here Be Monsters" - written by Paul Grist, art by Darwyn Cooke (originally published in Gotham Knights #23)
  - A mysterious villain named Madame X attempts to poison Gotham City's water supply with a powerful hallucinogen. When Batman arrives to stop her, she douses him with the toxin, which leads him to have horrific visions and doubt that he is not just as monstrous as the villains he pursues. However, his powerful will manages to shake off the accusation that he himself created the evil he fights, and the Caped Crusader apprehends Madame X while asserting his heroic nature.
- "Urban Legend" - written by Todd Dezago, art by Mike Wieringo (originally published in Gotham Knights #24)
  - A reporter attempts to purchase definite photographic proof of the rumoured vigilante and shed some light on the creature of the night. Batman explains that the mystery is far more powerful than the truth, and convinces the reporter that he is merely an urban legend - and functions better for being in that mysterious grey area. For the opposite suggestion on Batman's status as an urban legend, there is Brian Azzarello's "Cornered". For a less scrupulous journalist's attempts to photograph Batman, there is John Ostrander's "Snap".
- "Last Call at McSurley's" - written by Mike W. Barr, art by Alan Davis and Mark Farmer (originally published in Gotham Knights #25)
  - Matches Malone's local bar McSurley's is threatened with closure due to unpaid debts. This is bad news for Bruce Wayne, who uses various disguises to eavesdrop on the criminals who frequent the bar and thus solve a crime a night. He eventually devises a solution, which he puts into action when Matches passes a hat to collect cash to save McSurley's. To the bartender's surprise, someone places $10,000 into the collection, ensuring the bar's continued existence. Back in the Batcave, Alfred asks how he should list the withdrawal of $10,000 from petty cash. Recalling McSurley's earlier complaint the flies in the bar, Bruce says, "Flypaper", explaining that he will understand what it means.
- "Bruce Wayne is Batman!" - written by Cyrus Voris, art by Chris Bachalo (originally published in Gotham Knights #26)
  - An Arkham Asylum inmate conjures a demon and discovers that Batman is Bruce Wayne. Two cleaners discuss her story, and conclude that this "fact" is not worthy of further thought, coming from such a deranged and damaged mind. The more compassionate of the cleaners does a disappearing act, secure in the knowledge that his secret remains safe.
- "Never Say Die" - written by Dwayne McDuffie, art by Denys Cowan (originally published in Gotham Knights #27)
  - A small-time crook nicknamed "Do-Boy", who is in the employ of the Penguin, is determined to prove his worth by standing up to the Batman or die trying. While "just a man", Batman proves he can thwart all manner of plans - even last-ditch, desperate attempts at criminal glory.
- "Thin Edge of a Dime" - written by Don McGregor, art by Dick Giordano (originally published in Gotham Knights #28)
  - The Batman's work is never done, and trying to talk a non-descript Gothamite out of his suicidal tendencies is every bit as important as his regular duties.
- "No Escape" - written by Paul Kupperberg, art by John Watkiss (originally published in Gotham Knights #29)
  - Batman is captured by the Riddler and placed in an amazingly well-constructed death trap. As he struggles to escape the trap, he reflects on his training in the art of escapology, which he received from Max Dodge, a master escape artist. It is then revealed that Dodge himself, now in desperate need of money, designed the mechanism which now holds Batman. As he watches the Caped Crusader try to free himself, Dodge realizes the identity of the man behind the mask, and decides to fight back against the Riddler to help his former student. Though this heroism leads to a fatal heart attack, he is able to die knowing that he refused to give into villainy—a fact which Batman acknowledges as he talks to his old friend in his final moments.
- "Punchline" - written by Doug Alexander, art by Rob Haynes (originally published in Gotham Knights #30)
  - This dialogue-free story opens with a criminal running along the rooftops, carrying bags of cash from a bank heist. He eventually stumbles across some directional signs and the Bat-Signal, and drops the loot in terror to save himself. Harley Quinn then emerges from the shadows, giggling and clutching a flashlight with a miniature Bat-Signal, which she has used to frighten off her accomplice and take all of his ill-gotten gains for herself. However, the flashlight appears to be malfunctioning, as it continues to show a signal on the wall even after Harley turns it off. When she investigates, she discovers that the "signal" is actually the insignia on Batman's costume—he has been watching from the shadows as well, and spoils Harley's joke.
- "Hands" - written by Scott Peterson, art by Danijel Zezelj (originally published in Gotham Knights #31)
  - This story highlights two underexplored sides of Batman, those of forensic investigator and granter of absolution. Batman discovers an old death, and has to decide the path of least heartache when conveying the results of his investigation into the death of a young child to her surviving family.
- "Toyride" - written by Mark Askwith, art by Michael William Kaluta (originally published in Gotham Knights #32)
  - Three little girls write a letter to Bruce Wayne in which they tell a story about their strange classmate, who has a genius-level intellect and a knack for invention. Recently, the boy tried to destroy Batman by planting computer technology in a gigantic dinosaur statue; the boy used a remote control to steer the beast as the Caped Crusader struggled to contain it. The three girls saved the day by attacking their classmate and stealing his remote, defeating him. The letter ends with a "thank you", as Wayne has had the dinosaur filled with concrete and turned into the centerpiece for a playground for Gotham's children, including three small but brave heroes.
- "The Monument" - written by Darwyn Cooke, art by Bill Wray (originally published in Gotham Knights #33)
  - A wealthy philanthropist erects a tribute statue of Gotham's Guardian in Robinson Park. Mixed reactions see the silent statue act as a shrine, a deterrent, a homeless shelter and a graffiti-covered wall. Acting as a focal point for the pro-/anti-Batman camps, Professor Hugo Strange decides to destroy it in a symbolic gesture that emphasises his belief that Batman represents the worst of humanity. While Batman must apprehend Strange, he has more mixed feelings about saving the statue, declaring his aversion to a fan-club.
- "The Delusions of Alfred Pennyworth" - written by Danielle Dwyer, art by Scott Morse (originally published in Gotham Knights #34)
  - Alfred becomes convinced that the benevolent ghost of an old friend is haunting Wayne Manor, but decides not to tell Bruce Wayne, thinking that his master has enough delusions of his own, although Batman knows all about it.
- "Cornered" - written by Brian Azzarello, art by Jim Mahfood (originally published in Gotham Knights #35)
  - A world-weary Gothamite living in a crime-riddled area of the city witnesses Batman's just-too-late attempts to stop street hoods engaging in a gunfight, and questions Batman's methods, putting a question about whether a real threat will more likely to inspire the younger generation to be law-abiding than an urban legend. For the opposite suggestion, there is Todd Dezago's story "Urban Legend".
- "Fear is the Key" - written by Mike Carey, art by Steve Mannion and Hilary Barta (originally published in Gotham Knights #37)
  - A medieval sorcerer conjures a Bat-demon, but is revealed to be the Scarecrow, who has inadvertently absorbed a high dosage of an experimental hallucinogen and his own fear toxin. Triumphing over impossible odds, Batman returns the Scarecrow to Arkham Asylum, where he ponders the incredible resilience of Batman, who must similarly have been hallucinating wildly, and yet managed to maintain a grip on reality.
- 'Untitled' - written by Ann Nocenti, art by John Bolton (originally published in Gotham Knights #38)
  - The seedy underbelly of the Gotham underworld includes a large number of criminals who need the vicarious thrill of seeing Batman - and Catwoman - trussed, tortured and killed. One man runs a small 'business' to provide just such a thrill.
- "Sunrise" - written by Alex Garland, art by Sean Phillips (originally published in Gotham Knights #39)
  - An elderly Gothamite awakens early to capture the sunrise on film, only to tire herself out while climbing the stairs to her tenement's roof and decide that she is too old to spend her time trying to capture life. While musing about her age, she is surprised to discover Batman recovering from his nightly patrol; when he brusquely refuses to answer her questions about what happened, the woman scolds him, and he admits that he injured his shoulder during a raid on a building. The tables turn when Batman asks the woman about her camera, and she also stubbornly refuses to talk about what changed her mind. The Dark Knight smiles as he realizes the two are not so different and makes his exit—but not before taking a picture with his new friend, proving that it is never too late to create lasting memories.
- "Neighbourhood" - written by Robert Rodi, art by Jon Proctor (originally published in Gotham Knights #40)
  - Petty criminal Rico Tagliani lives in perpetual fear of Batman for decades, getting increasingly more paranoid as time passes. Ultimately his paranoiaic delusions lead him to larger crimes, even as it is revealed that there is always truth behind the fears of the Dark Knight Detective. There is also Ed Brubaker's title "I'll Be Watching", a similar story with different actions and results.
- "I'll Be Watching" - written by Ed Brubaker, art by Ryan Sook (originally published in Gotham Knights #41)
  - The janitor at Sprang Hall, Gotham's juvenile correctional facility, recalls the event that set him on his path to redemption and sees the guiding presence of Batman as a perpetual and comforting reminder of his new life. Meanwhile, Batman's inspirational second-chance offer is shown to be neither unique nor forgotten.
- "Gargoyles of Gotham" - by Dean Motter (originally published in Gotham Knights #42)
  - An art exhibition featuring photographs of some of Gotham's gargoyles allows art patron Bruce Wayne to recall his own memories of such omnipresent parts of the city's landscape, including their structural integrity and the secrets some of them hide, including one nicknamed "Clark", who secretly guards the garb of one Bruce Wayne when his alter-ego is on patrol.
- "Snap" - written by John Ostrander, art by Philip Bond (originally published in Gotham Knights #43)
  - A down-on-his-luck photojournalist tries to get photographic proof of Batman's existence. Attempts to bribe Commissioner Gordon fail, and a staged crime scene makes the photographer into a criminal himself. Both Gordon and Batman reiterate the importance of the unreality of the urban legend. For a more understanding photographer's take on the rights and wrongs of photographing Batman, there is Todd Dezago's story "Urban Legend". For the opposite suggestion on Batman's status as an urban legend, there is Brian Azzarello's story "Cornered".
- "The Best of Gotham" - by Jill Thompson (originally published in Gotham Knights #44)
  - A newspaper-style text and 'photos' guide to some of Gotham's "must-see" highlights, including mentions of the philanthropy of Gotham's most famous son, as well as the inspirational activities of the city's protector, which can be seen in the theaters, stand-up clubs, clothes shops, night clubs and a tailored museum: "Hideout" showcasing some of the items confiscated from Batman's rogues gallery, and funded by the Martha Wayne Outreach program.
- "Sidekick" - written by Kimo Temperance, art by Nathan Fox (originally published in Gotham Knights #45)
  - Batman has to carry out his patrol while babysitting a child who has been abandoned on the Batmobile by someone eager for fame.
- "Urban Renewal" - written by Will Pfeifer, art by Brent Anderson (originally published in Gotham Knights #46)
  - Writer/photographer Daniel McKinley notes the changing face of Gotham - and the world - from the kitsch architecture of "buildings shaped like cash registers" to the faceless conformity of the modern era. Turned down by publisher after publisher, he has almost resigned himself to writing a book about "gargoyle-covered skyscrapers", when his proposal is accepted by Signal Publishing, a division of Wayne Enterprises. Bruce Wayne, like McKinley, has a keen sense of nostalgia. A related story - Dean Motter's "Gargoyles of Gotham" - explains more on these iconic structures.
- "Riddle Me This" - written by Judd Winick, art by Whilce Portacio (originally published in Gotham Knights #47)
  - The Riddler, in a series of highlights from across his career, runs through a series of riddles before settling on one which describes his nemesis, as well as indulging in a spot of soul-searching, concluding that he wants to be caught.
- "The Mob is Dead, Long Live the Mob" - by Eric Cherry (originally published in Gotham Knights #48)
  - A former snitch tries to set himself up as a new mob boss, using Batman as a cover by feeding him information about minor drug deals while the major ones are carried out with impunity. The new "boss" is ultimately brought low by another snitch who fears that Batman is now in the employ of the gangs.
- "Fear is the Key" - written by Geoff Johns, art by Tommy Castillo and Rodney Ramos (originally published in Gotham Knights #49)
  - The Scarecrow runs through a litany of phobias, and regrets that his own addiction to fear has been compromised by an increasing immunity to his toxins. There is always something to fear, however, and for the Scarecrow, Batman is both the ultimate fear and the ultimate thrill.
- "The Gasworks" - written by Mike Mignola, art by Troy Nixey (originally published in Gotham Knights #36)
  - Two villains attempt to use a powerful hallucinogenic compound to incapacitate Batman and kill him. In an ironic twist of events, they manage to disable him enough that he cannot subsequently come to their rescue.

Note: "The Gasworks" is the only Black and White story to include color. Red permeates the story, the color of both the hallucinogen and the blood. This is likely the reason this story was moved to the end of the volume.

- DC Direct Gallery - showcasing the first dozen DC Direct-produced statues in the Batman: Black and White series.
  - Eduardo Risso's statue (sculpted by Tony Cipriano) and Simon Bisley's statue (sculpted by William Paquet).
  - Sketches by Alex Ross.
  - Sketches by Paul Pope (designs for his Batman: Year 100 Batman).
  - Brian Bolland's statue (sculpted by Jack Mathews).
  - Small rough sketches and statue by Tim Sale (statue sculpted by Jonathan Matthews).
  - Steve Rude's statue (sculpted by Jonathan Matthews).
  - Sketches by Steve Rude.
  - Rough sketches by Jim Lee.
  - Sketch and statue by Jim Lee (statue sculpted by Erick Sosa).
  - Individual cowl and close-up sketches by Kelley Jones.
  - Kelley Jones' statue (sculpted by Ray Villafane).
  - Matt Wagner's statue and sketches (statue sculpted by Paul Harding).

=== Volume 4 ===
This contains all-new material.

==== Issue #1 - November 2013 ====
- "Don't Know Where, Don't Know When" - written by Chip Kidd, art by Michael Cho
- "Batman Zombie" - by Neal Adams
  - The Caped Crusader has seemingly been turned into a ghoulish zombie, but still attempts to pursue his rogues gallery. As he does, he encounters various Gotham citizens who are suffering from unjust laws and cruel practices, including a woman being evicted from her home because of a bank's miscommunication and a man serving a life sentence for breaking a "three strikes" policy. The story's events are then revealed to be a nightmare Batman is having; when he awakens, he decides that is time to use his Bruce Wayne identity to help in the fight against a less dramatic, but still oppressive, evil.
- "Justice is Served" - written by Maris Wicks, art by Joe Quinones
  - Harley Quinn robs Gotham Burger, a new fast food restaurant, only to discover that anyone who eats its products bloats into a spherical ball covered in leaves. Harley suspects Poison Ivy of tainting the meals, but Ivy claims innocence and realizes that Max Glyson, a rival scientist who studied with her under Jason Woodrue, is trying to frame her. The women team up to defeat Glyson and expose his crimes, with Batman providing support and a means for Ivy to cure the citizens suffering from Gotham Burger's effects—including the Joker, who inadvertently ate some of the food that Harley brought to his lair.
- "Driven" - written by John Arcudi, art by Sean Murphy
  - Batman works on repairing the Batmobile after a chase with Roxy Rocket, a daredevil stuntwoman-turned-supervillain. As he works on the car's amazing technology, he recalls the intense pursuit—which surprisingly ended in the Batmobile not breaking down. Eager for the chance to work on the vehicle further, Batman deliberately sabotaged the engine and claimed that Roxy's actions were to blame; a sharp-eyed Alfred sees through the ruse, but decides to let Bruce have his fun regardless.
- "Head Games" - written by Howard Mackie, art by Chris Samnee

==== Issue #2 - December 2013 ====
- "Manbat Out of Hell" - written by Dan Didio, art by J. G. Jones
  - Batman pursues Dr. Kirk Langstrom, who has broken out of Arkham Asylum to attack an orphanage. The Caped Crusader fears that Man-Bat is after the children staying in the building, but discovers them unharmed in a bedroom upstairs. Closer investigation reveals that the orphans are being abused by their caretaker, who is Man-Bat's actual target. Batman helps Dr. Langstrom apprehend the criminal, and Man-Bat takes a few moments to spend time with two of the orphans, who are revealed to be his own children that, despite his monstrous transformation, he remembers and swears to protect.
- "Into the Circle" - by Rafael Grampá
- "A Place in Between" - by Rafael Albuquerque
  - Batman finds himself in a boat with Charon, crossing the River Styx. Charon tells him that he has died; to determine where he spends the afterlife, he must stay in the boat while witnessing horrific scenes from his own past. Batman struggles to contain himself and eventually breaks the rule by rushing to rescue Jason Todd. As he succumbs to grief, Charon inadvertently mentions that the Caped Crusader now understands fear—at which point Batman realizes that he is in another of the Scarecrow's toxin-induced hallucinations. He overpowers Scarecrow and congratulates him on a nearly-perfect ruse.
- "Winter's End" - written by Jeff Lemire, art by Alex Niño
- "Silent Knight…Unholy Knight!" - written by Michael Uslan, art by Dave Bullock

==== Issue #3 - January 2014 ====
- "Rule Number One" - by Lee Bermejo
- "Hall of Mirrors" - by Damion Scott
- "An Innocent Man" - written by Marv Wolfman, art by Riccardo Burchielli
  - A criminal condemned for murder is set to be executed in twenty-four hours, but new evidence makes Batman believe that he might be innocent. He works against the clock to explore the new leads and discovers that the true killer was the victim's wife, who discovered her husband's infidelity and murdered him in a rage. Batman returns to release the condemned man, who is revealed to be none other than the Joker. The Caped Crusader further remarks that he knows the entire situation is one of the Clown Prince of Crime's trademark jokes—he arranged everything, including telling the victim's wife about her husband's affair, just to force Batman to rescue him. The Joker gloats that his release means that Batman shares culpability for his future crimes, but the Dark Knight responds that the villain now owes him his life, and that when he does defeat him, it will be in the name of justice, not revenge.
- "Namtab: Babel Comes to Gotham" - by Rian Hughes
- "Role Models" - written by Paul Dini, art by Stéphane Roux
  - Batman and Commissioner Gordon receive a note from "Playground", a child abuser and kidnapper who targets prepubescent girls. Meanwhile, Playground's latest victim manages to escape her bonds and flees to Gotham's streets, hoping to find a superheroine to save her. Instead, the girl stumbles across Poison Ivy and Harley Quinn, who are preparing to rob a bank. Despite their criminal pasts, Ivy and Harley realize the girl's distress and work to defeat Playground, who even they find reprehensible. When Batman arrives on the scene to arrest the kidnapper, he is forced to let Ivy and Harley go at the child's request. The girl praises them as heroes, and Batman cannot help but smile as he agrees that for tonight, at least, the women are on the side of the angels.

==== Issue #4 - February 2014 ====
- "Ghost of Gotham" - written by Nathan Edmondson, art by Kenneth Rocafort
- "Tea-Minus Party" - written by Michael Allred and Lee Allred, art by Michael Allred
- "Long Day" - by Dustin Nguyen
- "Even In The Darknest Moments" - written by David Macho, art by Rubén Pellejero
- "Missing in Action" - by Sean Galloway

==== Issue #5 - March 2014 ====
- "Hell Night" - written by Ivan Brandon, art by Paolo Rivera
- "Cat and Mouse" - written by Keith Giffen, art by Javier Pulido
- "I Killed the Bat" - written by Blair Butler, art by Chris Weston
- "Flip Side!" - written by Len Wein, art by Víctor Ibáñez
- "Hope" - written by Jimmy Palmiotti, art by Andrew Robinson

==== Issue #6 - April 2014 ====
- "Clay" - by Cliff Chiang
- "Bruce" - written by Olly Moss and Becky Cloonan
- "The Batman: Hiding in Plain Sight" - by Dave Taylor
- "She Lies at Midnite" - by Adam Hughes
- "To Beat the Bat" - by Dave Johnson

=== Volume 5 ===
This contains all-new material.

==== Issue #1 - December 2020 ====
- "The Demon's Fist" - written by James Tynion IV, art by Tradd Moore
- "Weight" - by JH Williams III
- "Metamorphosis" - written by G Willow Wilson, art by Greg Smallwood
- "Sisyphus" - by Emma Rios
- "First Flight" - written by Paul Dini, art by Andy Kubert

==== Issue #2 - January 2021 ====
- "The Unjust Judge" - written by Tom King, art by Mitch Gerads
- "All Cats are Grey" - by Sophie Campbell
- "The Spill" - written by Gabriel Hardman and Corinna Bechko, art by Gabriel Hardman
- "Dual" - by Dustin Weaver
- "The Devil is in the Detail" - by David Aja

==== Issue #3 - February 2021 ====
- "The Cavalry" - written by John Ridley, art by Olivier Coipel
- "A Kingdom of Thorns" - by Bilquis Evely
- "I am the Bat" - by Bengal
- "Unquiet Knight" - written by Tim Seeley, art by Kelley Jones
- "Legacy" - by Nick Dragotta

==== Issue #4 - March 2021 ====
- "A Night in the Life of a Bat in Gotham" - written by Joshua Williamson, art by Riley Rossmo
- "Davenport House" - by Karl Kerschl
- "The Green Deal" - written by Chip Zdarsky, art by Nick Bradshaw
- "Checkmate" - by Daniel Warren Johnson

==== Issue #5 - April 2021 ====
- "A Father and Son Outing" - by Jorge Jiminez
- "Signals" - by Lee Weeks
- "Blue" - written by Mariko Tamaki, art by Emanuela Lupacchino and Wade Von Grawbadger
- "The Riddle" - written by Kieron Gillen, art by Jamie McKelvie
- "The Man Who Flies" - by Jamal Campbell

==== Issue #6 - May 2021 ====
- "The Second Signal" - written by Brandon Thomas, art by Khary Randolph
- "The Abyss" - written by Pierrick Colinet and Elsa Charretier, art by Elsa Charretier
- "Opening Moves" - by Nick Derington
- "Like Monsters of the Deep" - written by John Arcudi, art by James Harren
- "A Thousand Words" - written by Scott Snyder, art by John Romita Jr. and Klaus Janson

==== Pin-ups ====
The fifth volume also includes single-page pin-up renditions of Batman by:

- Max Fiumara
- Dexter Soy
- Stjepan Šejić
- Ramon Villalobos
- Ariela Kristantina
- Andie Tong
- Simone Di Meo
- Jen Bartel
- James Stokoe
- Amy Reeder
- Jesus Merino
- Babs Tarr

== Collected editions ==
Title	Material collected	Published date	ISBN
Batman: Black and White Vol. 1	Batman: Black and White (vol. 1) #1-4	December 1998	978-1563893322
Batman: Black And White Vol. 2	Material from Batman Gotham Knights #1-16	September 2002	978-1563899171
Batman: Black and White Vol. 3	Material from Batman Gotham Knights #17-49	August 2007	978-1845765545
Batman: Black and White Vol. 4	Batman: Black and White (vol. 2) #1-6	August 2014	978-1401246433
Batman: Black and White Omnibus	Batman: Black and White (vol. 1) #1-4, Batman: Black and White (vol. 2) #1-6 and material from Batman Gotham Knights #1-49	January 2020	978-1401295738
Batman: Black and White Vol. 5	Batman: Black and White (vol. 3) #1-6	September 2021	978-1779511966

== Motion comics ==
Warner Premiere, Warner Bros Digital Distribution, and DC Comics produced semi-animated adaptations of several of the Black and White short stories and released them as motion comics. The motion comics were produced and directed by Ian Kirby and feature an original musical score by composer Adam Fulton and voice actors, such as Michael Dobson as the voice(s) of Batman, the Joker, Thomas Wayne and Alfred Pennyworth, John Fitzgerald as Commissioner Gordon and Two-Face, Janyse Jaud as Harley Quinn, Catwoman and Martha Wayne and Joseph May as Superman. Ten episodes divided into two seasons are currently available via online streaming off of TheWB's website. The episodes are also available for purchase online via Apple's iTunes Store and other distribution channels, such as Amazon's Video On Demand for $0.99/two-episodes.

Season 1 Episode List (debuted on 12/8/2008):

- 1 - Here Be Monsters
- 2 - Broken Nose
- 3 - Two of a Kind
- 4 - Case Study
- 5 - Black and White Bandit
- 6 - Punchline
- 7 - Good Evening Midnight
- 8 - Hide and Seek
- 9 - Night After Night
- 10 - Perpetual Mourning

Season 2 Episode List (debuted on 7/23/2009):

- 1 - I'll Be Watching
- 2 - The Call
- 3 - Monsters in the Closet
- 4 - A Game of Bat and Rat
- 5 - Hands
- 6 - Sunrise
- 7 - In Dreams
- 8 - Heroes
- 9 - Legend
- 10 - Blackout

== Critical reaction ==
IGN Comics ranked Volume 1 of Batman: Black and White #13 on a list of the 25 greatest Batman graphic novels, saying: "Though having just eight pages to tell a story can certainly be confining, it also proves to be liberating. Forced to scrap complex plots but create something indelible, these tales are often parables, send-ups or unforgettable vignettes surrounding the Batman".

== Merchandise ==
=== Statues ===
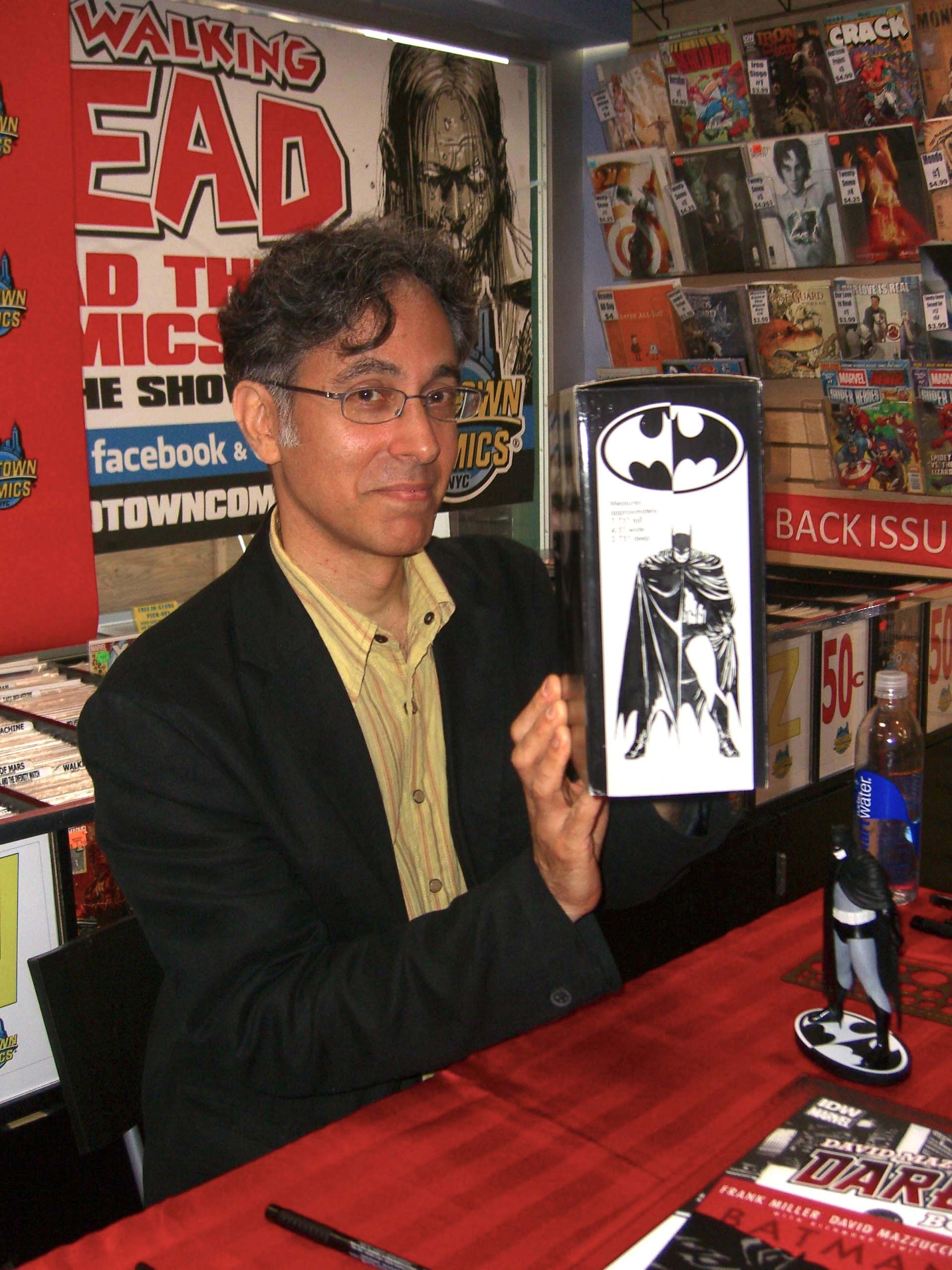
Artist David Mazzucchelli with the statue based on his artwork in the series at a June 28, 2012 book signing at Midtown Comics in Manhattan.

Several Batman: Black and White statues have been released by DC Collectibles. Some of these are based on designs used by various artists for their contributions to the three volumes of Black and White stories, but the line has expanded to include artwork from other titles as well as other characters.

Year	Character	Artist	Sculptor	Edition	Variation
2005	Batman	Eduardo Risso	Tony Cipriano	1st	N/A
2005	Batman	Simon Bisley	William Paquet	1st	N/A
2005	Batman	Tim Sale	Jonathan Matthews	1st	N/A
2005	Batman	Brian Bolland	Jack Mathews	1st	N/A
2005	Batman	Joe Kubert	Jonathan Matthews	1st	N/A
2006	Batman	Mike Mignola	Jonathan Matthews	1st	N/A
2006	Batman	Steve Rude	Jonathan Matthews	1st	N/A
2006	Batman	Kelley Jones	Ray Villafane	1st	N/A
2006	Batman	Paul Pope	Jean St. Jean	1st	N/A
2007	Batman	Matt Wagner	Paul Harding	1st	N/A
2007	Batman	Alex Ross	Karen Palinko	1st	N/A
2007	Batman	Jim Lee	Erick Sosa	1st	N/A
2007	Batman	Andy Kubert	Jonathan Matthews	1st	N/A
2007	Batman	Frank Miller	Alteron Bizarre	1st	N/A
2008	Batman	Bob Kane	Jack Mathews	1st	N/A
2008	Batman - Gotham Knight	N/A	Derek Miller	1st	Custom Gotham Knight base
2008	Batman	Neal Adams	Jason "Spydr" Adams	1st	N/A
2008	Batman	George Perez	Karen Palinko	1st	N/A
2008	Batman	Jim Aparo	Mike Locasio	1st	N/A
2009	Batman	Ethan Van Sciver	Ray Villafane	1st	N/A
2009	The Joker	Jim Lee	James Shoop	1st	N/A
2009	Batman - Gotham Knight	N/A	Derek Miller	1st	Custom Gotham Knight base
2009	Batman	Bruce Timm	James Shoop	1st	N/A
2009	The Penguin	Brian Bolland	Ray Villafane	1st	N/A
2009	Batman	David Mazzucchelli	Jim McPherson	1st	N/A
2009	Batman	Ed McGuinness	James Shoop	1st	N/A
2010	Batman	Lee Bermejo	Jean St. Jean	1st	N/A
2010	Batman	Marshall Rogers	Ray Villafane	1st	N/A
2010	Batman	Frank Quitely	Paul Harding	1st	N/A
2010	Catwoman	Steve Rude	Karen Palinko	1st	N/A
2010	The Man-Bat	Neal Adams	Jason "Spydr" Adams	1st	N/A
2010	Batman	Tony Daniel	James Shoop	1st	N/A
2010	The Joker	Lee Bermejo	Jean St. Jean	1st	N/A
2011	Batman	David Finch	Mike Locasio	1st	N/A
2011	Batman	Dustin Nguyen	Joseph Menna	1st	N/A
2011	Batman - Arkham Asylum	N/A	Dave Cortes	1st	N/A
2011	Batman - The Bat-man (unproduced work)	Cliff Chiang	Paul Harding	1st	N/A
2011	Batman	Patrick Gleason	Phil Ramirez	1st	N/A
2012	Batman - MAD Comics	Sergio Aragones	James Shoop	1st	N/A
2012	Batman	Mike Mignola	Jonathan Matthews	2nd	White base and chest shield changed from 1st ed.; the bat at the end of the rope was reversed; unnumbered
2012	Batman	Sam Kieth	Jonathan Matthews	1st	N/A
2012	Batman	Jim Lee	Paul Harding	1st	Full-color black/grey and blue/grey versions were released in 2018 as part of the Designer Series line
2012	Batman	Darwyn Cooke	Jonathan Matthews	1st	N/A
2012	Batman	Jock	Mike Locascio	1st	N/A
2012	The Joker	Brian Bolland	Brian Fay	1st	N/A
2012	Batman	Kelley Jones	Jonathan Matthews	2nd	White Base
2012	Bane	Kelley Jones	Ray Villafane	1st	N/A
2012	Batman Beyond	Dusten Nguyen	Jonathan Matthews	1st	N/A
2012	Batman	Frank Miller	Alterton Bizarre	2nd	White base and chest shield changed from 1st ed.
2013	Batman	Sean "Cheeks" Galloway	Irene Matar	1st	N/A
2013	Batman	Michael Allred	Jonathan Matthews	1st	N/A
2013	Batman	Rafael Grampá	Jean St. Jean	1st	N/A
2013	Batman	Sean Murphy	Jonathan Matthews	1st	N/A
2013	Batman - New 52	Greg Capullo	Jonathan Matthews	1st	N/A
2013	The Joker - New 52	Greg Capullo	Jonathan Matthews	1st	N/A
2013	Batman - Arkham Origins	N/A	Gentle Giant Studios	1st	N/A
2014	Batman - Earth 2	Nicola Scott	Mat Brouillard	1st	N/A
2014	Batman - Earth 1 GN	Gary Frank	Jean St. Jean	1st	N/A
2014	Harley Quinn	Bruce Timm	Jonathan Matthews	1st	N/A
2014	Batman	Jae Lee	Jonathan Matthews	1st	N/A
2014	Harley Quinn	Bruce Timm	Jonathan Matthews	2nd	White base
2014	Zombie Batman	Neil Adams	Erick Sosa	1st	N/A
2014	Batman	Michael Turner	Clayburn Moore	1st	N/A
2014	Batman	Simon Bisley	William Paquet	2nd	White base and chest shield changed from 1st ed.
2014	Batman	Brian Bolland	Jack Mathews	2nd	White base and chest shield changed from 1st ed.
2014	Batman	Tim Sale	Jonathan Matthews	2nd	White base and chest shield changed from 1st ed. (shield does not match prototype pictured)
2014	Batman	Eduardo Risso	Tony Cipriano	2nd	White base and chest shield changed from 1st ed. (shield does not match prototype pictured)
2014	Batman	Darwyn Cooke	Jonathan Matthews	2nd	White base and chest shield changed from 1st ed.
2014	Batman	Dick Sprang	Tony Cipriano and Josh Sutton	1st	N/A
2014	The Joker	Dick Sprang	Tony Cipriano and Josh Sutton	1st	N/A
2015	Batman	Francis Manapul	Clayburn Moore	1st	N/A
2015	Batman	Dave Johnson	Mat Brouillard	1st	N/A
2015	Batman	Ivan Reis	Mat Brouillard	1st	N/A
2015	Batman	Tony Millionaire	Tony Cipriano	1st	N/A
2015	Batman	Mike Mignola	Jonathan Matthews	3rd	Labeled as "Second Edition" on box, but actually different from the 2012 version; the bat at the end of the rope was fixed; Edition Size = 5,200
2015	Batgirl of Burnside	Cameron Stewart and Babs Tarr	Irene Matar	1st	N/A
2015	Batman	Bryan Hitch	Josh Sutton and Adam Ross	1st	N/A
2015	Batman	Jock	Mike Locascio	2nd	White base and chest shield changed from 1st ed.
2015	Batman	Greg Capullo	Jonathan Matthews	2nd	White base
2015	Batman - Arkham Asylum Prototype Illustration	Carlos D' Anda	Erick Sosa	1st	N/A
2015	The Scarecrow - Arkham Asylum Prototype Illustration	Carlos D' Anda	Erick Sosa	1st	N/A
2015	The Joker	Lee Bermejo	Jean St. Jean	2nd	White base
2015	Batman	Lee Bermejo	Jean St. Jean	2nd	White base
2015	Harley Quinn	Paul Dini	Steve Kiwus	1st	N/A
2015	Batman	David Mazzucchelli	Jim McPherson	2nd	White base and chest shield changed from 1st ed.
2016	The Joker	Jim Lee	James Shoop	2nd	White base
2016	Batman	Carmine Infantino	Tim Bruckner	1st	N/A
2016	Robin	Carmine Infantino	Tim Bruckner	1st	N/A
2016	Harley Quinn	Lee Bermejo	Jean St. Jean	1st	N/A
2016	Batman	Rafael Albuquerque	Jonathan Mathews	1st	N/A
2016	Harley Quinn	Paul Dini	Steve Kiwus	2nd	White base, black changed to dark grey
2016	The Joker	Lee Bermejo	Jean St. Jean	2nd	White base
2016	Robin	Frank Quitely	Paul Harding	1st	N/A
2016	The Joker	Frank Miller	Altertron	1st	N/A
2017	Batman	Jason Fabok	Jonathan Matthews	1st	N/A
2017	Batman	Kim Jung Gi	Jonathan Matthews	1st	N/A
2017	Nightwing	Jim Lee	Majid Esmaeili	1st	NA
2017	Batman	Norm Breyfogle	Chris Dahlberg	1st	NA
2017	Batman	Amanda Conner	Jonathan Matthews	1st	NA
2017	Harley Quinn	Amanda Conner	Jonathan Matthews	1st	NA
2018	Batman	Jonathan Matthews	Jonathan Matthews	1st	NA
2018	Batman	John Romita Jr.	Paul Harding	1st	NA
2018	Spy vs. Spy	Peter Kuper	Irene Matar	1st	NA
2018	Batman	Becky Cloonan	Irene Matar	1st	NA
2018	Batman	Gerard Way	Jonathan Matthews	1st	NA
2018	Batman Hot Topic Exclusive	Gerard Way	Jonathan Matthews	1st	The white paint details are brighter than the regular version; the chest logo is white instead of black; Edition Size = 750
2018	The Joker	Gerard Way	Jonathan Matthews	1st	NA
2018	The Joker Hot Topic Exclusive	Gerard Way	Jonathan Matthews	1st	The jacket is white instead of black; Edition Size = 750
2018	The Batman Who Laughs	Greg Capullo	Jonathan Matthews	1st	NA
2019	Batman	Jiro Kuwata	Jonathan Matthews	1st	NA
2019	Batman	Klaus Janson	Paul Harding	1st	NA
2019	Batman	Sean Murphy	Jonathan Matthews	1st	NA
2019	Batman Hot Topic Exclusive	Sean Murphy	Jonathan Matthews	1st	Color with custom Batman: White Knight base
2019	Batgirl	Bruce Timm	Jack Mathews	1st	N/A
2019	The Joker	Sean Murphy	Karen Palinko and Ziggy Halfpepper	1st	N/A
2019	Batman	Kenneth Rocafort	Paul Harding	1st	N/A
2019	Batman	Marc Silvestri	Neobauhaus	1st	N/A
2019	The Batman Who Laughs	Greg Capullo	Jonathan Matthews	2nd	White base; "chrome" paint highlights
2019	Batman	Joe Madudeiro	N/A	1st	N/A
2020	Batman	Gene Colan	Jean St. Jean	1st	N/A
2020	Batman	Doug Mahnke	Paul Harding	1st	N/A
2020	Batman	Todd McFarlane	Jonathan Matthews	1st	N/A
2020	Batman Armored	Frank Miller	Alterton	1st	N/A
2020	Batman Version 3	Jim Lee	Alejandro Pereira	1st	N/A
2021	Batmonster	Greg Capullo	N/A	1st	Not released
2021	Batman	Brian Bolland	N/A	1st	Not released
2021	Batman	Mike Mignola	N/A	1st	Not released
2021	Batman	Freddie Williams III	N/A	1st	Not released

=== Action figures ===
Starting in June 2018, some Batman action figures were re-released as black-and-white variants. They come with base stands that are similar to the ones used for the statues.

=== Mini PVC sets ===
Starting in May 2019, DC released mini PVC versions of some of the statues. These PVC versions were released in grouped box sets of seven at comics shops and in blind bags/boxes elsewhere.

== Awards ==
- 1997:
  - Won "Best Short Story" Eisner Award, for "Heroes"
  - Won "Best Anthology" Eisner Award
  - Nominated for "Best Limited Series" Eisner Award
  - Nominated for "Best Short Story" Eisner Award, for "Perpetual Mourning"
  - Scott Peterson/Mark Chiarello nominated for "Best Editor" Eisner Award
- 2003: Won "Best Graphic Album--Reprint" Eisner Award, for Batman: Black and White Volume 2
