= Dago (comics) =

Dago is an Argentine comics' character created in 1981 by Paraguayan writer Robin Wood and Argentine artist Alberto Salinas for Argentine magazine Nippur Magnum. It has been published in South America, Spain and Italy, among other places.

== Overview ==
Dago tells the story a 16th-century Venetian nobleman whose real name is Cesare Renzi. Cesare was betrayed and stabbed in the back by his best friend as part of a political plot during which his whole family is simultaneously murdered and framed for treason. Cesare survives the ordeal and is found adrift in the sea, with the dagger still in his back, by an Ottoman ship whose crewmembers save him and enslave him, baptizing him "Dago" in reference to the dagger that, like a mother, gives him a new life as a slave. As he realizes that he is still alive, he swears vengeance on the four men that took part in the conspiracy to destroy his family.

As a slave, he passes through several stages of the slave trade. He eventually becomes a rebel leader fighting for the Arab rebels in the desert against the Empire only to be captured and become a slave once again. He saves Barbarossa's life which leads him to become a janissary and eventually the Vizier's right-hand man. Later he's sent as a special envoy to the French Court, guarding a fortune in gold and jewels to be used as a bribe for King Francis who will use it as funds for his war against Spain. Dago participates in several battles and political plots defending the King from common enemies. This leads to his taking part in the Sack of Rome (1527) first as an invader and, later, as a defender of the city.

He has many romantic and sexual relationships throughout his life, including a fairly passionate affair with the French King's sister Marguerite, but they always end with the woman's death or his parting, moving on with his missions and voyages. He has at least one son, the result of a short-lived relationship with the daughter of a leader of a caravan on the Silk Route, prophesied to be a great warrior and leader in the future but fated never to meet his father.

After obtaining his revenge, he continues to travel around Europe, America, Africa and Asia, meeting several famous characters of history, but always living a solitary life.
