= Robin Wood (writer) =

Paraguayan comic book writer and author (1944–2021)

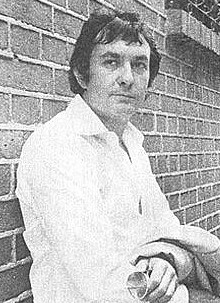
- Wood in 1980
- Born: 24 January 1944 New Australia, Paraguay
- Died: 17 October 2021 (aged 77) Asunción, Paraguay
- Area: Writer
- Notable works: Nippur de Lagash; Dago; Gilgamesh el immortal

Robin Wood (24 January 1944 – 17 October 2021) was a Paraguayan comic book writer and author. He is mostly known for his classical work in Argentine comics and his later work in European comics.

== Biography ==
Born to a family of Australian-Paraguayan origins in 1944, Wood spent his childhood between Paraguay and Argentina with his mother, before leaving to do various jobs, such as dishwasher, truck driver, salesman, wood chopper, journalist and factory worker in those two countries as well as in Brazil. Anne Whitehead's 1997 book on New Australia, Paradise Mislaid, provides a chapter on Robin Wood's childhood with his extended Australian-Paraguayan family.

Wood settled in Buenos Aires while working as a correspondent for Argentine newspaper El Territorio, and worked a series of unqualified jobs before he started writing scripts for popular comic book publishing company Columba. His first published work was Aquí la retirada, illustrated by his friend Lucho Olivera, in the magazine D'artagnan, and would soon become one of the most important comic writers not only of Argentine comics, but that of Latin America.

In the 1980s Wood moved to Europe, where he continued with his writing success, especially in Italy, where he won the Yellow Kid award. Wood settled in Denmark with his Danish wife Anne-Mette and their children.

Wood died on 17 October 2021 at the age of 77 in Asunción, Paraguay.

== Works ==
Among Wood's most important works are Nippur de Lagash (1967, art by Olivera), Dennis Martin (1967), Dago (1980, Alberto Salinas), Savarese (1978, Mandrafina), Mark, Big Norman, Martin Hel, Merlin, Wolf, Gilgamesh el inmortal (Olivera), Morgan, Dax, Los Amigos, El Cosaco, Aquí la Legión, Mojado and Helena, and the humour comics of Pepe Sánchez and Mi novia y yo, both illustrated by Carlos Vogt.
