= Nippur de Lagash =

Comic series

Nippur de Lagash (English: Nippur of Lagash) is an Argentine historical comic series, published between 1967 and 1998. It is set in the 23rd century BC (according to the short chronology), about a fictional homonym warrior of Sumer. The series features scripts by Robin Wood, and illustrations by Lucho Olivera. It was published by Columba Publishing in the magazine D'Artagnan and later Nippur Magnum comic books from 1967 to 1998, and is considered one of the most important Argentine comics.

Authors and artists who worked on this comic include Sergio Mulko, Néstor Barrón, Gustavo Amézaga, Ricardo Villagrán and Jorge Zaffino.

== Plot summary ==
The protagonist's parents name him after the ancient city of Nippur, where they were born. He later gained the epithet "from Lagash" after leaving his home city, Lagash, in forced exile.

Nippur's adventures, loosely framed on actual Ancient History, start when he is a general and military leader of Lagash, who is forced to escape from Mesopotamia after an invasion carried out by the tyrant Lugal-Zage-Si. Nippur then wanders around the Bronze Age known world, the Middle East and the Eastern Mediterranean. He makes friends and enemies, acquires enormous fame, first as "The Errant One" and then as "The Incorruptible", fights many battles and loses one eye.

After some years of living the life of a farmer and raising his son, the wild archer Hiras, Nippur eventually decides to take up the sword once more: he and his allies take part on the Akkadian conquest of the Fertile Crescent. Thus does Nippur become king of Lagash, but after some time he chooses to abdicate and resumes his travels for the rest of his life.

== Publication history ==
The character first appeared in 1967 in issue No. 151 of the magazine D'Artagnan, published by Editorial Columba. The story was originally conceived as a standalone work, but its success and requests from Columba readers for more stories about the protagonist led Robin Wood to continue writing adventures about Nippur.

Twelve years later, on 11 December 1979, the character received his own publication, Nippur Magnum.

Over the course of thirty-one years, the series produced approximately 450 individual episodes.
