= Solo (comics) =

Solo, in comics, may refer to:

- Solo (DC Comics), a DC Comics series
- Solo (Marvel Comics), a Marvel Comics character
- Solo (Dark Horse Comics), a 1996 mini-series from Dark Horse Comics
- Han Solo, a character who has appeared in numerous comic book adaptations of Star Wars
- Sky Solo, a character from Alan Moore's series 1963
- Solo Avengers, a Marvel Comics series

== See also ==
- Solo (disambiguation)
