= John Arcudi =

American comic book writer

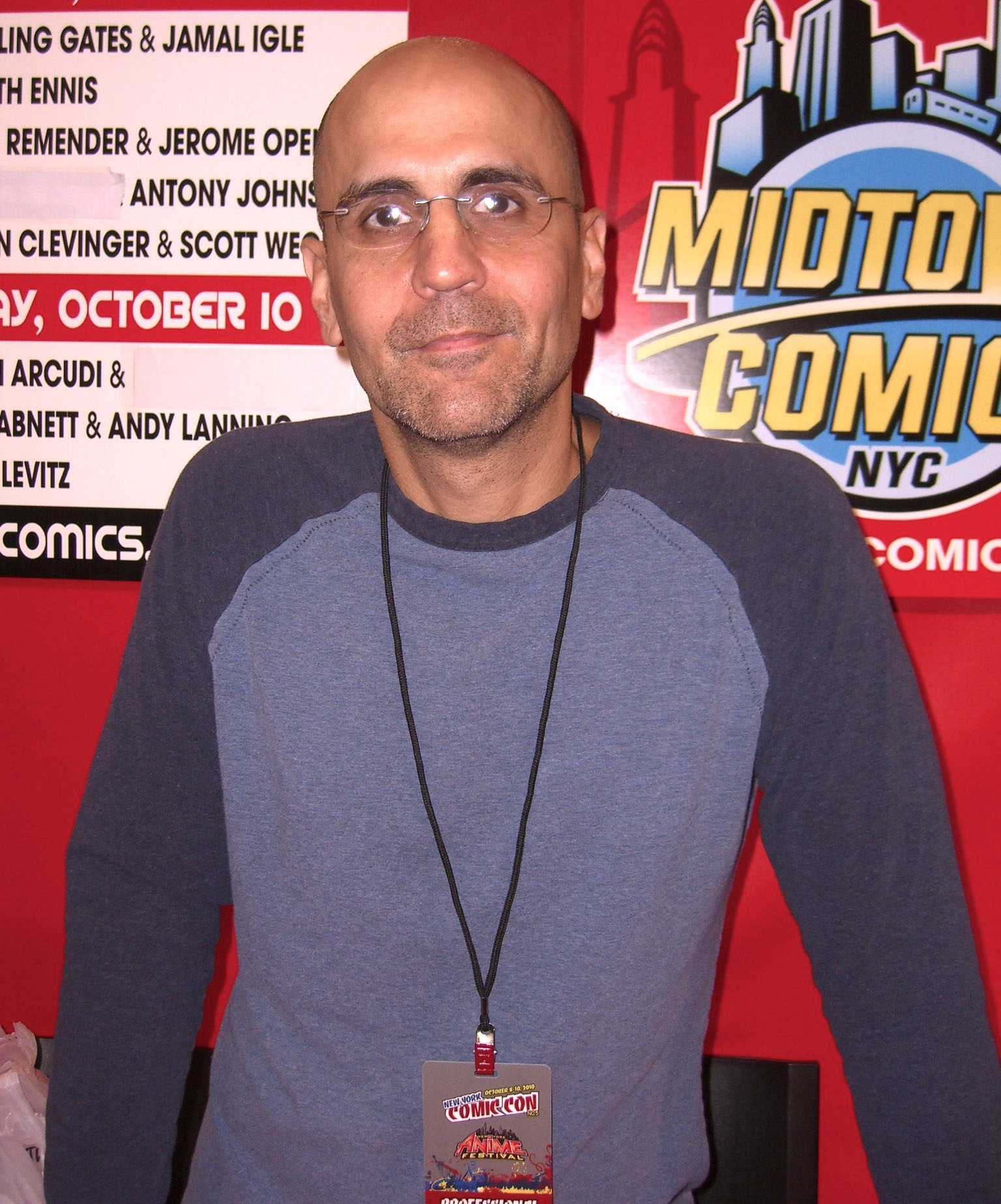
- Arcudi at New York Comic Con 2010
- Born: Norwalk, Connecticut, U.S.
- Area: Writer
- Notable works: The Mask; B.P.R.D.

John Arcudi is an American comic book writer, best known for his work on The Mask and B.P.R.D. and his series Major Bummer.

== Early life ==
Arcudi grew up in Buffalo, New York. He attended Columbia University as an English major and developed an appreciation for the works of Edgar Rice Burroughs and William Faulkner.

== Career ==
Arcudi worked for Malibu Comics upon its founding in 1986, working on its Eternity line. That same year he started writing for comics, making his first sales to Savage Tales and Savage Sword of Conan for Marvel Comics, and becoming a regular contributor to the humor magazine Cracked.

Arcudi worked on a number of comic books based on films, including RoboCop, Terminator, Predator, Alien, and The Thing. Two of these graphic works were subsequently adapted as full-length novels published by Bantam Books. Arcudi's series Barb Wire, featuring bounty hunter and bartendress Barbara Kopetski, was adapted into a film of the same name starring Pamela Anderson.

Arcudi also scripted several stories for Dark Horse Presents, such as the series "The Creep", and the police procedural "Homicide". Arcudi's comics crime fiction also includes several scripts for Batman: The Dark Knight and Batman: Black and White.

For Dark Horse Comics, Arcudi worked on developing the second incarnation of the character The Mask first in Mayhem #1–4, and then in a series of books illustrated by Doug Mahnke. Arcudi's work formed the basis of the 1994 feature film starring Jim Carrey. He later also worked on the spin-off television series. Arcudi and later Mahnke teamed up for several projects following The Mask, including the DC Comics series Major Bummer, which focused on a group of ineffectual superheroes.

Arcudi also served as writer on the Wildstorm Productions series Gen13, illustrated by Gary Frank and Cam Smith, and during a run on DC's Doom Patrol, illustrated by Tan Eng Huat.

Arcudi invented the character Captain Daimio for the series B.P.R.D., which he writes with Mike Mignola. Arcudi had contributed a "B.P.R.D." story to the Hellboy comic issued in conjunction with the film as a premium from Wizard Entertainment. Arcudi later wrote a number of separate B.P.R.D. series.

Arcudi contributed the Superman story to Wednesday Comics. He also created a graphic novel called A God Somewhere with Peter Snejbjerg providing the art.

Aside from working in the comic media, Arcudi has also worked briefly in animation. He has written two episodes of The Mask: Animated Series, and one episode of the motion comics based on the comic Batman Black and White.

== Bibliography ==
=== Comics ===
- Abe Sapien (with Mike Mignola)
  - The Haunted Boy
  - The Abyssal Plain #1–2
  - The Devil Does Not Jest #1–2
  - The New Race of Man #1–2
  - "Subconscious" published in Dark Horse Presents (2014) #11
- Aliens: Alchemy #1–3
- Aliens: Genocide #1–4
- Aliens: Stronghold #1–4
- Aquaman #25–29, 32–39
- Batman Black and White vol. 5 #6 (with James Harren)
- Batman: Gotham Nights #4, 7
- Batman: Legends of the Dark Knight #162-63
- B.P.R.D. (with Mike Mignola)
  - "Born Again" published in Hellboy: Premiere Edition
  - The Dead #1–5
  - The Black Flame #1–6
  - The Universal Machine #1–5
  - Garden of Souls #1–5
  - Killing Ground #1–5
  - "Revival" published in MySpace Dark Horse Presents #8–9
  - War on Frogs #1–4
  - The Ectoplasmic Man
  - "Out of Reach" published in Free Comic Book Day: Hellboy (2008)
  - The Warning #1–5
  - The Black Goddess #1–5
  - King of Fear #1–5
  - Casualties
  - 1948 #1–5
- B.P.R.D.: Hell on Earth (with Mike Mignola)
  - New World #1–5
  - Seattle
  - Gods #1–3
  - Monsters #1–2
  - Russia #1–5
  - "An Unmarked Grave" published in Dark Horse Presents (2011) #8
  - The Long Death #1–3
  - The Devil's Engine #1–3
  - The Return of the Master #1–5
  - A Cold Day in Hell #1–2
  - Wasteland #1–3
  - Lake of Fire #1–5
  - The Reign of the Black Flame #1–5
  - The Devil's Wings #1–2
  - The Broken Equation #1–2
  - Grind
  - Flesh and Stone #1–5
  - Nowhere, Nothing, Never #1–3
  - Modern Prometheus #1–2
  - End of Days #1–5
  - Cometh the Hour #1–5
- Barb Wire #1–8
- Baseball Greats #1: The Jimmy Piersall Story
- Brass #1–6
- The Creep #0–4
- Dark Horse Comics #1–7, 17–19
- Dark Horse Presents (1986) #23–29, 46, 48–49, 53–58, 60–61, 63–64, 115, 122–23, 146–49
- Dark Horse Presents (2011) #8, 11–13
- Dark Horse Presents (2014) #11, 19–21, 26
- Dark Horse Presents Annual 1997
- Dark Horse Presents: Aliens #1
- Doom Patrol, vol. 3, #1–22
- Excalibur #104, 105
- Flinch #12
- Gen 13, #25–40
- Gen 13: Carny Folk #1
- The Goon: Noir #2
- Hellboy and the B.P.R.D.: 1952 #1–5
- Hellboy: Weird Tales #4—"Abe Sapien: Star of the B.P.R.D."
- Homicide #1
- Image+ (2017) #2
- Justice League of America: Destiny #1–4
- Justice League of America: Superpower #1
- Lobo/Mask #1–2 (with Alan Grant)
- Lobster Johnson (with Mike Mignola)
  - The Burning Hand #1–5
  - The Prayer of Neferu
  - Caput Mortuum
  - Satan Smells a Rat
  - A Scent of a Lotus #1–2
  - Get the Lobster #1–5
  - A Chain Forged in Life
  - The Glass Mantis
  - The Forgotten Man
  - Metal Monsters of Midtown #1–3
  - Garden of Bones
  - The Pirate's Ghost #1–3
  - Mangekyō
- The Machine #1–4
- Major Bummer #1–15
- Martian Manhunter, vol. 2 #5
- Mayhem #1–4
- The Mask #0–4
- The Mask Returns #1–4
- The Mask Strikes Back #1–5
- Motorhead #1
- MySpace Dark Horse Presents #6, 8–9, 12, 26
- Predator: Big Game #1–4
- RoboCop: Prime Suspect #1–4
- RoboCop: Roulette #1–4
- Rumble (2014) #1–15
- Rumble (2017) #1–17
- Savage Sword of Conan #150-52, 158, 165, 182
- Savage Tales, second series, #5, 7–8
- Silver Sable #26
- Sledgehammer 44 (with Mike Mignola)
  - Sledgehammer 44 #1–2
  - Lightning War #1–3
- Solo #2, 6
- Teenage Mutant Ninja Turtles #38 (cover image only)
- Terminator #1–4
- The Thing from Another World: Climate of Fear #1–4
- Thunderbolts #76–81
- Total Carnage #1–4, 6–10
- Walter: Campaign of Terror #1–4
- Warlock and the Infinity Watch #34–35, 37–40, 42
- What if...? Vol. 2, #50
- Wednesday Comics #1–12 – Superman (writer), with art by Lee Bermejo. (2009)
- Sir Edward Grey, Witchfinder: Lost and Gone Forever #1–5 (with Mike Mignola)

=== Graphic novels ===
- A God Somewhere with Peter Snejbjerg, published by WildStorm, June 2010, 200 pages, ISBN 978-1401226831 / ISBN 978-1401232467 (New edition)

=== Collections ===
Title	Date	Publisher	ISBN
The Best of Dark Horse Presents – Volume 1	November 1989	Dark Horse Comics	ISBN 978-1569712085
The Terminator: Tempest	September 1991	Dark Horse Comics	ISBN 978-1878574213
Predator: Big Game	August 1992	Dark Horse Comics	ISBN 978-1569711668
Aliens: Genocide	December 1992	Dark Horse Comics	ISBN 978-1569711231
The Best of Dark Horse Presents – Volume 2	January 1993	Dark Horse Comics	ISBN 978-1569710029
The Mask	May 1993	Dark Horse Comics	ISBN 978-1878574503
The Thing from Another World and Climate of Fear	September 1993	Dark Horse Comics	ISBN 978-1878574855
Robocop: Prime Suspect	October 1993	Dark Horse Comics	ISBN 978-1878574879
The Mask Returns	August 1994	Dark Horse Comics	ISBN 978-1569710210
Barb Wire	January 1996	Dark Horse Comics	ISBN 978-1569711392
The Mask Strikes Back	June 1996	Dark Horse Comics	ISBN 978-1569711682
Aliens: Stronghold	July 1996	Dark Horse Comics	ISBN 978-1569711545
Decade	April 1997	Dark Horse Comics	ISBN 9781569711798
Gen 13: I Love New York	September 1999	DC Comics	ISBN 978-1563895432
Scatterbrain	December 2001	Dark Horse Comics	ISBN 978-1569714263
Batman: Black & White – Volume 2	October 2003	DC Comics	ISBN 978-1563899171
Thunderbolts: How to Lose	November 2003	Marvel Comics	ISBN 9780785112488
Hellboy: Weird Tales – Volume 1	December 2003	Dark Horse Comics	ISBN 978-1569716229
B.P.R.D. – Volume 4: The Dead	September 2005	Dark Horse Comics	ISBN 978-1593073800
B.P.R.D. – Volume 5: The Black Flame	July 2006	Dark Horse Comics	ISBN 978-1593075507
B.P.R.D. – Volume 6: The Universal Machine	January 2007	Dark Horse Comics	ISBN 978-1593077105
Dwight T. Albatross's; The Goon: Noir	July 2007	Dark Horse Comics	ISBN 978-1401227470
Aliens Omnibus – Volume 2	December 2007	Dark Horse Comics	ISBN 978-1593078287
B.P.R.D. – Volume 7: Garden of Souls	January 2008	Dark Horse Comics	ISBN 978-1593078829
The Terminator Omnibus – Volume 1	February 2008	Dark Horse Comics	ISBN 978-1593079161
Predator Omnibus – Volume 2	February 2008	Dark Horse Comics	ISBN 978-1593077334
B.P.R.D. – Volume 8: Killing Ground	May 2008	Dark Horse Comics	ISBN 978-1593079567
The Mask Omnibus – Volume 1	August 2008	Dark Horse Comics	ISBN 978-1593079277
Barb Wire Omnibus	August 2008	Dark Horse Comics	ISBN 978-1593079932
MySpace Dark Horse Presents – Volume 1	September 2008	Dark Horse Comics	ISBN 978-1593079987
Aliens Omnibus – Volume 5	October 2008	Dark Horse Comics	ISBN 978-1593079918
MySpace Dark Horse Presents – Volume 2	January 2009	Dark Horse Comics	ISBN 978-1595822482
The Mask Omnibus – Volume 2	March 2009	Dark Horse Comics	ISBN 978-1593079376
B.P.R.D. – Volume 10: The Warning	April 2009	Dark Horse Comics	ISBN 978-1595823045
B.P.R.D. – Volume 11: The Black Flame	October 2009	Dark Horse Comics	ISBN 978-1595824110
B.P.R.D. – Volume 12: War on Frogs	April 2010	Dark Horse Comics	ISBN 978-1595824806
Wednesday Comics	June 2010	DC Comics	ISBN 978-1593077853
B.P.R.D. – Volume 14: King of Fear	November 2010	Dark Horse Comics	ISBN 978-1595825643
B.P.R.D. Plague of Frogs 2 (omnibus)	August 2011	Dark Horse Comics	ISBN 978-1595826725
B.P.R.D. Hell on Earth – Volume 1: New World	August 2011	Dark Horse Comics	ISBN 978-1595827074
B.P.R.D.: Being Human	November 2011	Dark Horse Comics	ISBN 978-1595827562
Witchfinder – Volume 2: Lost and Gone Forever	January 2012	Dark Horse Comics	ISBN 978-1595827944
B.P.R.D. Hell on Earth – Volume 2: Gods and Monster	January 2012	Dark Horse Comics	ISBN 978-1595828224
B.P.R.D. Plague of Frogs 3 (omnibus)	March 2012	Dark Horse Comics	ISBN 978-1595828606
Abe Sapien – Volume 2: The Devil Does Not Jest and Other Stories	April 2012	Dark Horse Comics	ISBN 978-1595829252
B.P.R.D. Hell on Earth – Volume 3: Russia	August 2012	Dark Horse Comics	ISBN 978-1595829467
B.P.R.D. Plague of Frogs 4 (omnibus)	November 2012	Dark Horse Comics	ISBN 978-1595829740
Lobster Johnson – Volume 2: The Burning Hand	November 2012	Dark Horse Comics	ISBN 978-1616550318
B.P.R.D. Hell on Earth – Volume 4: The Devil's Engine & The Long Death	December 2012	Dark Horse Comics	ISBN 978-1595829818
The Creep	April 2013	Dark Horse Comics	ISBN 978-1616550615
B.P.R.D. Hell on Earth – Volume 6: The Return of the Master	August 2013	Dark Horse Comics	ISBN 978-1616551933
B.P.R.D.: 1948	September 2013	Dark Horse Comics	ISBN 978-1616551834
Abe Sapien – Volume 3: Dark and Terrible and The New Race of Man	December 2013	Dark Horse Comics	ISBN 978-1616552848
B.P.R.D. Hell on Earth – Volume 7: A Cold Day in Hell	January 2014	Dark Horse Comics	ISBN 978-1616551995
Lobster Johnson – Volume 3: Satan Smells a Rat	February 2014	Dark Horse Comics	ISBN 978-1616552039
B.P.R.D. Hell on Earth – Volume 8: Lake of Fire	April 2014	Dark Horse Comics	ISBN 978-1616554026
Sledgehammer 44 – Volume 1	May 2014	Dark Horse Comics	ISBN 978-1616553951
Batman: Black & White – Volume 4	July 2014	DC Comics	ISBN 978-1401246433
B.P.R.D. Hell on Earth – Volume 9: The Reign of the Black Flame	September 2014	Dark Horse Comics	ISBN 978-1616554712
Hellboy: Weird Tales (omnibus)	November 2014	Dark Horse Comics	ISBN 978-1616555108
Lobster Johnson – Volume 4: Get the Lobster!	December 2014	Dark Horse Comics	ISBN 978-1616555054
B.P.R.D. Hell on Earth – Volume 10: The Devil's Wings	March 2015	Dark Horse Comics	ISBN 978-1616556174
B.P.R.D.: 1946–1948 (omnibus)	June 2015	Dark Horse Comics	ISBN 978-1616556464
Rumble – Volume 1: What Color of Darkness?	June 2015	Image Comics	ISBN 978-1632153838
Hellboy and the B.P.R.D.: 1952	August 2015	Dark Horse Comics	ISBN 978-1616556600
B.P.R.D. Hell on Earth – Volume 11: Flesh and Stone	September 2015	Dark Horse Comics	ISBN 978-1616557621
B.P.R.D. Hell on Earth – Volume 12: Metamorphosis	December 2015	Dark Horse Comics	ISBN 978-1616557942
B.P.R.D. Hell on Earth – Volume 13: Metamorphosis	December 2015	Dark Horse Comics	ISBN 978-1616557942
Rumble – Volume 2: A Woe That Is Madness	February 2016	Image Comics	ISBN 978-1632156044
B.P.R.D. Hell on Earth – Volume 13: End of Days	May 2016	Dark Horse Comics	ISBN 978-1616559106

=== Magazines ===
- Cracked (1987)
- Monsters Attack! (1989)
- The Comics Journal (Winter 2003 Special Edition)
