= Scrapyard Detectives =

Comic book series

The Scrapyard Detectives

The Scrapyard Detectives is a free comic book series created by artist Bill Galvan and writer Chad Denton devoted to promoting a union and cooperation of young people from differing cultures. This educational comic book series was created to present an appreciation of multiculturalism, ethnicity and diversity. The Diversity Foundation publishes The Scrapyard Detectives as an educational tool offered to libraries, educators and community groups. They are full-color, professional books. Scrapyard Detectives has a lot in common with Three Investigators, which followed the adventures of three investigators in a junkyard.

Scrapyard Detectives has been contributed to by New York Times Best Selling Children's Book Author Jesse Leon McCann, who wrote the storyline for the third book. McCann also donates time at San Diego Comic-Con, talking about the message of tolerance in Scrapyard Detectives.

Scrapyard Detectives has had guest contributors in each issue.

Because of its independent publishing, Scrapyard Detectives classifies as an independent comic.

== History ==
Scrapyard Detectives was commissioned by Dr. Dan Fischer to encourage tolerance and acceptance of others and thus prevent attitudes that lead to hate crimes.

Each comic is themed on how an appreciation of diversity would help avoid a bad situation and move someone beyond preconceived notions about others.

Scrapyard Detectives has been used by Dr. Robyn A. Hill, Teacher Educator, who included the series in a free online book, Secret Origin of Good Readers. Secret Origin of Good Readers also organizes a panel on using graphic novels to promote literacy, which has run at San Diego Comic-Con and at WonderCon.

The first three issues of Scrapyard Detectives are collected into a graphic novel titled The Scrapyard Detectives: Collected Cases, Volume One (ISBN 978-0-9797193-0-1). This 104 page collected edition also includes an origin story written by Supernatural Law creator/writer Batton Lash, which details how the three main characters met and solved their first case. The introduction to the collected edition is written by J.M. DeMatteis, and also features pinups and artwork by Michael T. Gilbert, Jack Purcell and Derek Hunter. These collected volumes were created specifically to be sold to libraries, with all proceeds going back to the Diversity Foundation to produce more single issues of the comic book series.

== Characters ==
- Robert Reilly - Robert is the brains of the operation. His father owns the scrapyard, which is filled with discarded technical equipment that Robert can make gadgets out of to help solve their cases. The scrapyard is just one of many enterprises that Robert's father owns, and his business calls for him to travel extensively. Robert has the highest GPA of his school.
- Raymond Garcia - Raymond is impulsive, but brave in the face of danger. He usually is the first one to use Robert's inventions while they're still in the testing phase. Ray is a comic book fan and his favorite superhero is Captain Patriot. He also likes to make short films and hopes to study film-making. His family owns a small market in the city.
- Jinn Lee - Jinn is the intuitive detective of the group. She has a knack for being able to piece clues together to solve a mystery. She has a younger brother named Kahl, who likes to spend as much time with her as he can. Jinn was an aspiring skateboarding competitor before the accident that put her in a wheelchair. She is currently undergoing physical therapy to learn to walk again. Jinn also has a pet spider named Rex.
- Katie - Katie is Raymond's younger cousin, and she visits him regularly. An avid reader of junior mystery novels, Katie follows her cousin's adventures and idolizes the Scrapyard Detectives. After helping them on a case, she is made an official Scrapyard Detective. Katie has a hyper active imagination that sees “mysteries” to solve everywhere.
- Lisan Khatib - Lisan's family moved to the United States from India. Lisan helps the Scrapyard Detectives with research, and is a part-time member, due to his after school activities. Lisan is also on the school basketball team, and has the second highest GPA at his school, after Robert.

== Inventions and Gadgets ==
- The Detecto-Sled - The "Detecto-Sled" is a one-person hovercraft vehicle that was invented and constructed by Robert. It was made from a variety of discarded parts found in the scrapyard, but the main pieces were salvaged from a vacuum cleaner, a small leaf blower motor and a snowboard. Two old metal cylinders from a fire extinguisher serve as the propulsion thrust. The handle bars are from Robert's old bicycle, and feature a brake system modified from the bicycle as well. Robert only got to ride it a short time, before Raymond started using it almost exclusively, bringing it back in for repairs from time to time. The engine appears to run on plain gasoline.
- REX 2.0 Robotic Spider - "REX 2.0" is a remote controlled surveillance device that resembles a robotic spider. The device is named after Jinn's pet spider, Rex, but Jinn was quick to point out that spiders have 8 legs, not four, so technically it does not qualify as a spider. REX 2.0 was created by Robert as a way to gather information the course of investigations, when surveillance in person can't be accomplished. REX 2.0 is guided by remote control in the form of a rewired video game system controller which controls its movements. Using special goggles, the user can see the environment that REX 2.0 is scrambling over via a small web camera installed in its central shell. In the case of "A Friend in Need", REX 2.0 was stomped on by Ben Crenshaw's father, a suspect in an investigation by Raymond. REX 2.0 has not returned to active duty, and is still awaiting repairs by Robert.

== Issues ==
There are four issues of Scrapyard Detectives.

- 1. "The Case of the Missing Roses"
- 2. "Patriot Dreams"
- 3. "A Friend in Need"
- 4. "...And Forget"

The Scrapyard Detectives: Collected Cases, Volume 1 Graphic Novel

- 1. Collects all three previous issues.
- 2. The Case of the Missing Junk (origin story)
