= The Hard Way =

The Hard Way or Hard Way may refer to:

== Books and comics ==
- The Hard Way (novel), a 2006 Jack Reacher novel by Lee Child
- The Hard Way, a 100 Bullets story arc

== Film and television ==
- The Hard Way (1916 film), a British silent crime film
- The Hard Way (1943 film), an American musical drama film
- The Hard Way (1980 film), a British TV action film
- The Hard Way (1991 film), an American buddy cop film

== Music ==
=== Albums ===
- Hard Way, by Show-Ya, 1990
- The Hard Way (213 album), 2004
- The Hard Way (Cameron Whitcomb album) or the title song, 2025
- The Hard Way (Clint Black album) or the title song, 1992
- The Hard Way (James Hunter album) or the title song, 2008
- The Hard Way (Owsley album) or the title song, 2004
- The Hard Way (Steve Earle album), 1990
- The Hard Way (Tinsley Ellis album), 2004

=== Songs ===
- "The Hard Way" (The Kinks song), 1976
- "The Hard Way" (Mary Chapin Carpenter song), 1992
- "The Hard Way" (Pnau and Khalid song), 2023
- "The Hard Way" (Thirsty Merc song), 2007
- "Hard Way", by Bia, 2025
- "Hard Way", by Miguel from All I Want Is You, 2010
- "The Hard Way", by Celine Dion from Courage, 2019
- "The Hard Way", by Fort Minor from The Rising Tied, 2005
- "The Hard Way", by Kasey Chambers from The Captain, 1999
- "The Hard Way", by the Turnpike Troubadours from A Long Way from Your Heart, 2017
- "(I Learned) The Hard Way", by Johnny Cash from The Baron, 1981

== Other uses ==
- Hard way, a type of bet in craps

== See also ==
- Hardway (disambiguation)
