= Don Thompson Awards =

American awards for comics and animation

Don Thompson Award
- Awarded for: Achievement in comic books, comic strips, and animation
- Location: Motor City Comic Con; Detroit, Michigan
- Country: United States
- Presented by: CompuServe
- First award: 1992
- Final award: 1998

The Compuserve Comics and Animation Forum's Don Thompson Awards (also known as the Thompsons) were given for achievement in comic books, comic strips, and animation. Initiated in 1992, they were originally known as the Compuserve Comics and Animation Forum Awards for the CompuServe forum that created and gave out the award. In 1994, after the death of long-time comics enthusiast and publisher Don Thompson, the awards were renamed in Thompson's honor. The final awards were presented in 1998.

Nominees were selected by Compuserve Comics Forum members, with write-in votes allowed; voting was open to Compuserve Comics Forum members. The awards were administered and presented annually at the Detroit-based multigenre convention Motor City Comic Con.

== Categories ==
Awards are for work done during the listed year.

=== Best Achievement by a Writer ===
- 1992 Neil Gaiman
- 1993 Neil Gaiman
- 1994 Neil Gaiman
- 1995 Kurt Busiek
- 1996 Kurt Busiek
- 1997 Kurt Busiek
- 1998 Warren Ellis

=== Best Achievement by a Penciller ===
- 1992 Tom Mandrake
- 1993 Tom Mandrake
- 1994 Chris Bachalo
- 1995 Michael Zulli
- 1996 Brent Anderson
- 1997 George Pérez

=== Best Achievement by an Inker ===
- 1992 Gerhard
- 1993 George Pérez
- 1994 Mark Buckingham
- 1995 Mike Mignola
- 1996 George Pérez
- 1997 Mark Farmer

=== Favorite Penciller/Inker or Penciller/Inker Team ===
- 1998 Bryan Hitch/Paul Neary

=== Best Achievement by a Painter ===
- 1992 Dave McKean
- 1993 Alex Ross
- 1994 Alex Ross
- 1995 Alex Ross
- 1996 Alex Ross
- 1997 Alex Ross
- 1998 Alex Ross

=== Best Achievement by a Letterer ===
- 1992 Todd Klein
- 1993 Tom Orzechowski
- 1994 Todd Klein
- 1995 Todd Klein
- 1996 Todd Klein
- 1997 Todd Klein

=== Best Achievement by a Colorist ===
- 1992 Steve Oliff
- 1993 Steve Oliff
- 1994 Steve Oliff
- 1995 Trish Mulvihill
- 1996 Trish Mulvihill
- 1997 Matt Hollingsworth
- 1998 Matt Hollingsworth

=== Best Achievement by an Editor ===
- 1992 Karen Berger
- 1993 Mike Carlin
- 1994 tie:
  - Karen Berger
  - Dwayne McDuffie
- 1995 Karen Berger
- 1996 Fabian Nicieza
- 1997 Archie Goodwin
- 1998 Stuart Moore

=== Best Achievement by a Cover Artist ===
- 1992 Brian Bolland
- 1993 Brian Bolland
- 1994 Alex Ross
- 1995 Alex Ross
- 1996 Alex Ross
- 1997 Alex Ross
- 1998 Alex Ross

=== Best Achievement by a New Talent ===
- 1992 Joe Quesada
- 1993 Alex Ross
- 1994 Terry Moore
- 1995 Paul Jenkins
- 1996 Mark Crilley
- 1997 Sean McKeever
- 1998 Paul Storrie

==== Talent Most Deserving of Wider Recognition ====
- 1998 Brian Wood

=== Best Achievement by a Writer & Artist ===
- 1992 John Byrne
- 1993 Jeff Smith
- 1994 tie:
  - Terry Moore
  - Jeff Smith
- 1995 David Lapham
- 1996 Frank Miller
- 1997 Batton Lash

==== Favorite Writer & Artist or Cartoonist (Drama) ====
- 1998 Frank Miller

=== Best Achievement by a Cartoonist ===
- 1996 tie:
  - Sergio Aragonés
  - Batton Lash

==== Favorite Individual Comic-Strip Creator or Creative Team ====
- 1998 Scott Adams

=== Favorite Individual Comic-Book Creator or Single Creative Team ===
- 1998 Kurt Busiek/Brent Anderson

=== Best Achievement by a Political Cartoonist ===
- 1992 Garry Trudeau
- 1993 Garry Trudeau
- 1994 Garry Trudeau
- 1995 Garry Trudeau
- 1996 Garry Trudeau

=== Best Long-Form Animation ===
- 1992 Aladdin
- 1993 The Nightmare Before Christmas
- 1994 The Lion King
- 1995 Toy Story
- 1996 Superman: Last Son of Krypton
- 1997 Anastasia

==== Favorite Animated Film ====
- 1998 A Bug's Life

=== Best Short-Form/TV Animation ===
- 1992 Batman: The Animated Series
- 1993 Batman: The Animated Series
- 1994 The Tick
- 1995 The Adventures of Batman & Robin
- 1996 The Simpsons
- 1997 The Simpsons

==== Favorite Animated TV Series ====
- 1998 The New Batman/Superman Adventures

=== Best Cover ===
- 1992 Spectre #2
- 1993 Marvels #2
- 1994 Marvels #3
- 1995 Astro City #1
- 1996 Kingdom Come #4
- 1997 Astro City #9

==== Favorite Cover ====
- 1998 Preacher #40

=== Best Continuing Series ===
- 1992 The Sandman
- 1993 The Sandman
- 1994 The Sandman
- 1995 Astro City
- 1996 Astro City
- 1997 Astro City

==== Favorite Ongoing Comic Book Series ====
- 1998 Transmetropolitan

=== Best Limited Series ===
- 1992 Gotham Nights
- 1993 Marvels
- 1994 Marvels
- 1995 The Tale of One Bad Rat
- 1996 Kingdom Come
- 1997 The Kents

==== Favorite Limited Comic-Book Series ====
- 1998 Whiteout

=== Best New Series ===
- 1992 The Spectre
- 1993 Static
- 1994 Starman
- 1995 Astro City
- 1996 Leave It to Chance
- 1997 Transmetropolitan

==== Favorite New Series ====
- 1998 Astounding Space Thrills

=== Most Improved Series ===
- 1992 X-Factor
- 1993 The Flash
- 1994 Legion of Super-Heroes & Legionnaires
- 1995 Captain America
- 1996 StormWatch
- 1997 Captain America

=== Favorite Short Story (less than one standard issue in length) ===
- 1998: Desire, Batman 80-Page Giant #1

=== Best Single Issue ===
- 1992 X-Factor #87
- 1993 The Sandman #50
- 1994 Marvels #4
- 1995 Black Lightning #5
- 1996 Astro City #1
- 1997 Astro City #10

==== Favorite Single-Issue Story (about one standard issue in length) ====
- 1998 Another Cold Morning, Transmetropolitan #8

=== Best Story Arc ===
- 1992 The Sandman #35-37 ("A Game of You")
- 1993 The Sandman #51-56 ("Worlds' End")
- 1994 Valor #22-23, Legion of Super-Heroes #60-61, Legionnaires #17-18 ("End of an Era")
- 1995 The Sandman ("The Wake")
- 1996 tie:
  - Astro City #2-3 ("Everyday Lives"/"Adventures in Other Worlds")
  - Captain America #450-453 ("Man Without a Country")
- 1997 Astro City #5-9 ("Confession")

==== Favorite Serialized Story (continued from issue to issue or otherwise longer than one standard issue in length) ====
- 1998 Sonovawitch, Wolff & Byrd, Counselors of the Macabre #17-19

=== Favorite Comic-Book Work for All Ages ===
- 1998 Batman: Gotham Adventures

=== Best Graphic Novel ===
- 1992 Star Trek: Debt of Honor
- 1993 Batman/Houdini: The Devil's Workshop
- 1994 Mr. Punch
- 1995 Stuck Rubber Baby
- 1996 Batman/Captain America
- 1997 The Wizard's Tale

==== Favorite New Graphic Novel or Graphic Album ====
- 1998 Superman: Peace on Earth

=== Best Non-Fiction Work ===
- 1992 Amazing Heroes #200's Understanding Comics preview
- 1993 Understanding Comics
- 1994 From Hell
- 1995 The Big Book of Conspiracies
- 1996 Fax from Sarajevo
- 1997 The Big Book of Scandal!

=== Best Reprint Series or Collection ===
- 1992 The Sandman: Season of Mists
- 1993 The Complete Bone Adventures Vol. 1
- 1994 Marvels deluxe hardcover
- 1995 The Tale of One Bad Rat
- 1996 Astro City: Life in the Big City
- 1997 Kingdom Come

==== Favorite Reprint Graphic Novel or Graphic Album (Current Work) ====
- 1998 Astro City: Family Album

=== Favorite Reprint Graphic Novel or Graphic Album (Historical Work) ===
- 1998 The Plastic Man Archives, Vol. 1

=== Best Publication Design ===
- 1992 The Batman Adventures
- 1993 Daredevil: Man Without Fear
- 1994 Marvels
- 1995 Astro City
- 1996 Astro City: Life in the Big City
- 1997 Acme Novelty Library

==== Favorite Publication Design ====
- 1998 Acme Novelty Library

=== Best Marketing Idea ===
- 1992 Vertigo Preview
- 1993 photocopiable coupons
- 1994 Legion of Super-Heroes "reboot"
- 1995 Marvel 99-cent titles
- 1996 DC and Marvel's Adventures-style titles
- 1997 Image's black-&-white "non-line"

=== Best American Publication of Foreign Material ===
- 1992 Signal to Noise
- 1993 Akira hardcover
- 1994 Drawn & Quarterly
- 1995 Domu: A Child's Dream
- 1996 Gon
- 1997 What's Michael?

==== Favorite American Presentation of Foreign Material ====
- 1998 Gon Color Spectacular (only nominee; award dropped for final ballot)

=== Best Publication About Comics ===
- 1992 Comics Buyer's Guide
- 1993 Understanding Comics
- 1994 Comics Buyer's Guide
- 1995 Comics Buyer's Guide
- 1996 Comics Buyer's Guide
- 1997 Comics Buyer's Guide

==== Favorite Publication about Comic Strips, Comic Books, or Animation ====
- 1998 tie:
  - Comic Book Artist
  - Comics Buyer's Guide

=== Best Anthology ===
- 1992 Miracleman: Apocrypha
- 1993 Negative Burn
- 1994 Dark Horse Presents
- 1995 Negative Burn
- 1996 Batman Black and White
- 1997 Negative Burn

=== Best Newspaper Strip ===
- 1992 Calvin and Hobbes
- 1993 Calvin and Hobbes
- 1994 Calvin and Hobbes
- 1995 Calvin and Hobbes
- 1996 Dilbert
- 1997 For Better or For Worse

== See also ==
- Alley Award
- Eagle Award
- Eisner Award
- Inkpot Award
- Kirby Award
- Shazam Award
