= List of 100 Bullets story arcs =

100 Bullets is an Eisner and Harvey Award-winning comic book written by Brian Azzarello and illustrated by Eduardo Risso. It was published by DC Comics under its Vertigo imprint and ran for 100 issues. A short story also appeared in Vertigo: Winter's Edge #3.

== First Shot, Last Call ==
Introduction written by Jim Steranko:

- 100 Bullets #1-3: Dizzy Cordova is released from prison and is approached by Agent Graves, who gives her an attache containing the means to avenge her murdered family.
- Shot, Water Back #4-5: Lee Dolan is a former restaurateur whose life was ruined by a conviction for child pornography, a crime he claims to have never committed. Agent Graves finds Dolan tending bar at a hole in the wall and informs him that he was framed by Megan Dietrich, then gives Dolan an attache.
- Silencer Night

== Split Second Chance ==
- Short Con, Long Odds #6-7: Dice-tossing con man Chucky served seven years in prison for DUI and vehicular manslaughter, only to learn from Graves that his childhood friend Pony was actually behind the wheel.
- Day, Hour, Minute...Man #8: Agent Graves meets with Lono to deliver a briefcase full of money and make an offer the former Minuteman shouldn't refuse.
- The Right Ear, Left in the Cold #9-10: Cole Burns sells ice cream and stolen cigarettes and enjoys living with his girlfriend Sasha... until a certain word awakens him to a previous life as a Minuteman.
- Heartbreak, Sunny Side Up #11: Agent Graves reveals to a mother the sad truth about what really happened to her runaway daughter.
- Parlez Kung Vous #12-14: Mr. Shepherd sends Dizzy Cordova to Paris to meet Mr. Branch, an American expatriate and former journalist who also received an attaché from Agent Graves. But rather than pursue revenge, Branch started digging, and his investigation led to an incomplete knowledge of The Trust.

== Hang Up on the Hang Low ==
- Hang Up on the Hang Low #15-18: Agent Graves gives Louis "Loop" Hughes the chance to meet the father who abandoned him and one hundred bullets to kill him, if he wishes.
- Epilogue for a Road Dog #19: Lono returns for something that was taken from him, and Loop discovers that turning down an offer from Agent Graves can have serious consequences.

== A Foregone Tomorrow ==
- The Mimic #20: Benito Medici meets up with Shepherd to discuss The Trust's number one enemy: Agent Graves.
- Sell Fish & Out to Sea #21-22: Jack, a hardcore drug addict, receives the attaché from Agent Graves, and the someone in the photo is not who he expected.
- Red Prince Blues #23-25: The Trust holds its annual summit in Atlantic City, while Agent Graves and Cole Burns prepare to send the thirteen families a message.
- Mr. Branch and the Family Tree #26: In Paris, Mr. Branch reveals everything he knows about The Trust and the Minutemen to a hooker who is more than she seems.
- Idol Chatter #27: A former baseball great meets Agent Graves for the second time, leading them to discuss the events surrounding the former player's effort to avenge his famous ex-wife's murder at the hands of a powerful politician. The issue is based on the story of Joe DiMaggio and Marilyn Monroe, and the theories about the gunman on the grassy knoll.
- ¡Contrabandolero! #28-30: Living a slacker's life in El Paso and fascinated by a brief meeting with Dizzy Cordova, Wylie Times finds himself volunteered for a deadly business trip across the border to Juárez.

== The Counterfifth Detective ==
- The Counterfifth Detective #31-36: Private eye Milo Garret is drawn into a murder mystery and a painting theft involving Megan Dietrich that eventually leads to questions regarding his own identity, as well as a fateful meeting with Lono.

== Six Feet Under the Gun ==
- On Accidental Purpose #37: Dizzy returns to Chicago, while Agent Graves and Mr. Shepherd discuss their plans.
- Cole Burns Slow Hand #38: Cole Burns tries to win back the heart of Sasha, while a pair of thieves hit a snag.
- Ambition's Audition #39: Benito Medici learns an important lesson in what it means to be part of The Trust.
- Night of the Payday #40: Money in hand means more trouble for Lono.
- A Crash #41: As Graves meets with three members of The Trust, a young couple find that luck can be a cruel mistress.
- Point Off The Edge #42: Agent Graves travels to El Paso to deliver an attaché to Wylie Times.

== Samurai ==
- Chill In The Oven #43-46: Loop Hughes is embroiled in a lethal case of prison politics when Lono arrives at the same facility.
- In Stinked #47-49: Jack Daw and Mikey are on their way to Atlantic City when a visit with Mikey's cousin goes horribly wrong.

== The Hard Way ==
- Prey For Reign #50: The sixth member of Graves' Minutemen is revealed. In the aftermath of a robbery, Victor Ray tells the origin story of The Trust.
- Wylie Runs the Voodoo Down #51-57: The pain of Wylie's past is revealed and his future is turned upside down.
- Coda Smoke #58: A stop on the road for Wylie, Shepherd, and Dizzy leads to the end of the road for one of them.

== Strychnine Lives ==
- The Calm #59: The newly released Lono and Loop Hughes team up to locate another Minuteman.
- Staring at the Son #60 - 63: Megan Dietrich travels to Miami for meetings with the Medicis and Branch. The machinations of the leading characters are set against a story featuring a young bellboy and the New York criminal Spain (a character previously mentioned but not seen in issue #20).
- The Dive #64: Jack Daw, now a bare knuckle fighter in Atlantic City, has an unpleasant reunion with Agent Graves.
- New Tricks #65 - 66: Lono, Loop Hughes and Victor Ray bring brutal frontier justice to some members of The Trust.
- Love Let Her #67: Dizzy and Wylie are sought in Mexico by Benito Medici and Mr. Branch.

== Decayed ==
- Sleep, Walker #68-69: The Trust meets again in Atlantic City to discuss the decimation of their members and the continuing threat of Agent Graves and the Minutemen, while Lono prepares to activate a dormant Minuteman.
- A Wake #70-74: One of a pair of Cleveland brothers receives the attaché case from Agent Graves, while the Trust deals with a further transition within its organisation.
- Amorality Play #75: Graves approaches someone down on their luck, gives them the infamous briefcase, and then that person must decide what to do with it. But when Lono is factored in with an offer - and another side of the story in the case - Agent Graves' mysterious plans could be in jeopardy.

== Once Upon a Crime ==
- Punch Line #76-79: The different groups of reactivated Minutemen and their accomplices have a violent confrontation in the Mexican city of Juarez.
- A Split Decision #80: Dizzy and Agent Graves have a face to face discussion about her future.
- Tarantula #81-83: Ronnie Rome heads to Italy in pursuit of the painting, and does a business deal with the duplicitous Echo Memoria.

== Dirty ==
- The Lady Tonight #84: A day in the life of Sigmar Rhone, a powerful member of the Trust.
- Red Lions #85: Benito is reunited with his father and the new dynamic at Casa Medici. Lono meets up with someone whose life he ruined.
- Rain in Vain #86: Victor Ray performs some professional and private business in Aspen, CO, both with devastating effects.
- The Blister #87: Joan D'Arcy hires former minuteman Will Slaughter to kill an unknown target. Meanwhile Remi Rome takes care of business for Graves.
- My Lonely Friend #88: Cole Burns and Mr. Branch finish some business in Atlantic City.

== Wilt ==
- 100 Bullets: Chapter 1 - Corner of the Sky #89: Agent Graves marks the nearing of the end of his war against the Trust, as a young wannabe gangster called Pip is drawn deeper into the underworld he inhabits.
- 100 Bullets: Chapter 2 - Lost in a Roman #90: A change of play occurs between the remaining Minutemen, while the youngster Pip seals his future in the criminal world.
- 100 Bullets: Chapter 3 - Closer #91: Will Slaughter carries out his contract as a manhunt for Pip takes shape.
- 100 Bullets: Chapter 4 - Our Men in the Ravine #92: Jack and Cole deal with some unfinished business while Graves and the Trust react to a recent elimination.
- 100 Bullets: Chapter 5 - Rooster #93: Remi Rome tries to settle a particular account but personal matters get in the way. Meanwhile Graves meets up with some of his former masters.
- 100 Bullets: Chapter 6 - Kill de Sac #94: More is revealed about the sour history between Graves and the Trust and two long term characters interact for the first time.
- 100 Bullets: Chapter 7 - Ducks #95: The results of the D'Arcy hit are revealed as the body count increases in the war between the Trust and the Minutemen.
- 100 Bullets: Chapter 8 - Damaged Good #96: The aftermath of Graves' summit with his former masters is revealed as Lono continues to play by his own rules.
- 100 Bullets: Chapter 9 - Fearsomality Crisis #97: Some of the remaining members of the Trust meet in Omaha. Meanwhile different parties converge to dole out retribution to their intended targets.
- 100 Bullets: Chapter 10 - Five Rook(ed)s #98: Lono delivers a gift to Benito, a Minuteman for his father. The Minuteman is revealed to be Dizzy. Benito promptly shoots Lono, due to his feelings for the newest member.
- 100 Bullets: Chapter 11 - Boots On #99: The Trust realigns and the Minutemen deal with the new dynamic, as Benito takes over the House of Medici and Graves replaces Javier as head of his House. Cole convinces the members with him that Graves has had ulterior plans the entire time and Graves makes Dizzy the new Agent for the Minutemen.
- 100 Bullets: Chapter 12 - A House of Graves #100: In the climactic finale to the series, Cole's group of Minutemen have contacted the injured Lono. He storms the Medici mansion after Benito is murdered (presumably by the other heads of houses) as Cole's team slaughter the house guards. Graves is convinced Augustus set Benito up to be murdered, so that Dizzy, as the new head of the minutemen, avenge him, leaving Augustus in sole control of the Trust. Dizzy shoots Lono as he's about to attack Graves, and Burns dispatches all three younger members of the Trust, including Megan Dietrich, although he accidentally kills himself as well by setting off a gasoline explosion. As the Medici mansion burns, Dizzy is injured by falling debris, the other remaining Minutemen (including Will Slaughter) retreat, and Graves murders Augustus for his actions. Dizzy says that as Graves made a move against another House, he must pay for it, while Graves explains that he compromised his principles to play his attache game. Dizzy tells him that it wasn't Augustus' fault, but his own, and the final page is Dizzy holding a gun to Graves' head in the burning house as he says he knows.
