= Hardaway =

Hardaway is a surname. Notable people with the surname include:

- Ben Hardaway, American animator
- Benjamin F. Hardaway, American Medal of Honor recipient
- Brewington Hardaway, American chess player
- Diamond and Silk, American pair of conservative political commentators
- Julie Noegel Hardaway, American clubwoman
- Lula Mae Hardaway, American songwriter and mother of singer Stevie Wonder
- Milton Hardaway (1954–2008), American football player
- Patricia Hardaway, American labor lawyer and academic administrator
- Penny Hardaway, American basketball player and coach
- Robert A. Hardaway, Confederate artillery officer and college professor
- Tim Hardaway, American basketball player
- Tim Hardaway Jr., son of the above, American basketball player

== See also ==
- Hardaway High School, in Columbus, Georgia
- Charles Hardaway Marks Bridges, in Virginia
- Hardway (disambiguation), includes list of people with surname Hardway
