= Alex de Campi =

American music video director, comics writer and columnist

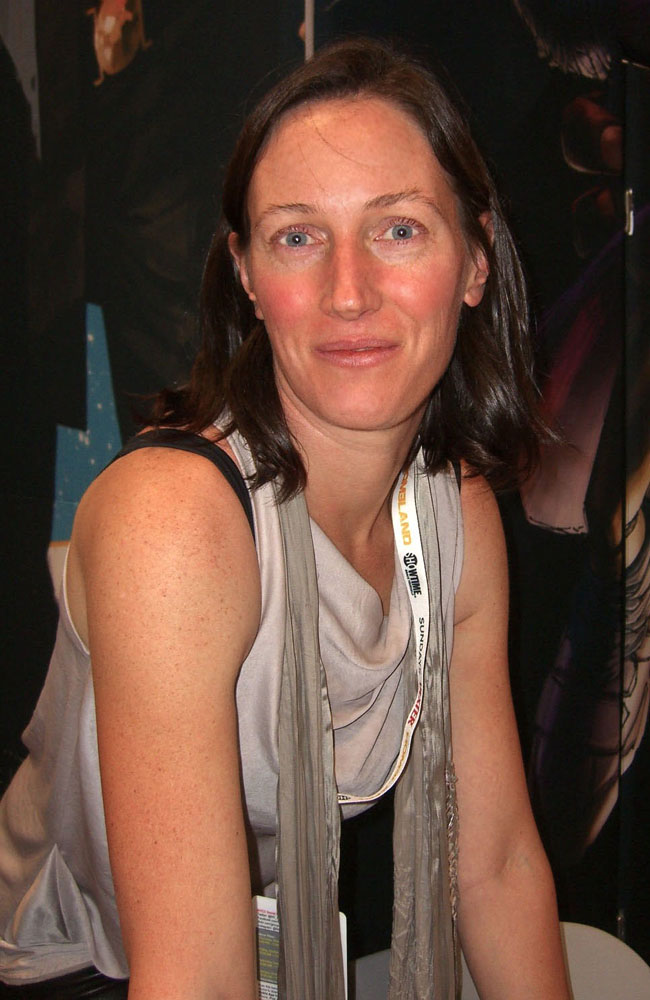
- De Campi at the 2012 New York Comic Con
- Area: Writer
- Notable works: Smoke (2005)

Alex de Campi is a British-born American music video director, comics writer and columnist.

== Career ==
=== Comics ===
Alex de Campi wrote 2005's mini-series Smoke (published by IDW Publishing, art by Igor Kordey), which was nominated for the Eisner Award for Best Limited Series, and her 2006 manga series Kat & Mouse (published by Tokyopop, art by Federica Manfredi). Some of De Campi's work falls outside the superhero genre, with Smoke being a political thriller, and Kat & Mouse detailing the adventures of two mystery-solving high school students (a "CSI for tweens"); she has published work for children (e.g. Agent Boo) and for the European market (e.g. her French language sci-noir series Messiah Complex).

Her other works includes the Valentine mobile comic, which was the main focus of her column "Uncanny Valleygirl" at the comics industry website Bleeding Cool, and the series Grindhouse: Doors Open at Midnight for Dark Horse.

In April 2015, she launched an ongoing thriller at Image Comics titled No Mercy with Carla Speed McNeil. In addition, she wrote a mini-crossover series for Archie Comics and Dark Horse Comics titled Archie vs. Predator, in which the Archie gang meets The Predator. The series features the characters illustrated in the classic Archie style, while the 2019 sequel by de Campi, Archie vs. Predator II, the rebooted versions of the Archie characters meet the rebooted Predator from the then-most-recent film. In 2015, she also wrote a two-issue Wonder Woman story, among other comics.

In 2017, she co-authored with Arthur Wyatt a Judge Dredd story set in the continuity of the 2012 film. This appeared in issues 386-388 of Judge Dredd Megazine.

In November 2018 it was announced by the streaming service Crunchyroll that it would produce a Blade Runner animated series entitled Blade Runner: Black Lotus, which was scheduled to be released in 2021. De Campi wrote two episodes for the series.

In 2019 de Campi released a graphic novella called Bad Girls with artist Victor Santos. Bad Girls, a crime story, takes place in the twelve hours prior to Fidel Castro's ascension to power in Cuba. The book received much acclaim and won de Campi two nominations for the Eisner Award. She received two more nominations for the Eisners in 2019 for the anthology series Twisted Romance that she published around Valentine's Day by Image Comics.

Also in 2019, she wrote the prologue of a story called Full Tilt Boogie for 2000 AD, which later became a series. A trilogy was published in 2020, 2024 and 2025.

In 2020, de Campi co-created with Duncan Jones a crowd-funded comic titled Madi: Once Upon a Time in the Future that takes place in the world of Jones' previous films Moon and Mute.

In September - December 2025, de Campi wrote a Rogue Trooper story Ghost Patrol in 2000 AD (Progs 2450-2463), illustrated by Neil Edwards, coloured by Matt Soff=e and lettered by Jim Campbell and Rob Steen. This was published in June 2026 in a collection by Rebellion.

In April 2026 de Campi announced her original 100-page graphic novel, Dan Dare: First Contact, illustrated by Marc Laming, would be published in November 2026 by B7 Comics, funded by a Kickstarter campaign.

The British Science Fiction Association's journal Vector praised DeCampi's work Grindhouse as one of six groundbreaking science fiction works (by women) in the comics medium, and declared: "If science fiction was ever a male genre, and comics ever a male medium, de Campi is the saboteur extraordinaire."

=== Direction of music videos ===
De Campi directed a number of music videos, including the video for Amanda Palmer's "Leeds United", the animated video for Flipron's "Raindrops Keep Falling on the Dead" (which was featured at the 2008 Marfa Film Festival, and SXSW in 2007), The Real Tuesday Weld feat The Puppini Sisters' "Apart of Me" (shown at Soho Shorts in 2008) and for The Schema's "Those Rules You Made". She has given a "BBC Two Masterclass" on shooting videos, for Blast (a BBC initiative to encourage creativity in young people), focusing on her October 2007 video for The Real Tuesday Weld versus The Puppini Sisters.

=== Prose novels ===
In 2020, de Campi published her first pose novel, The Scottish Boy. Chapters from the book had been published online beginning in 2018.

A second prose novel, Heartbreak Incorporated, was released in the summer of 2021.

== Works ==
=== Bibliography ===
- Smoke (art by Igor Kordey, 3-issue mini-series, 2005, tpb, 156 pages, December 2005, ISBN 1-933239-28-X)
- Kat & Mouse (art by Federica Manfredi, 2006)
- Agent Boo (art by Edo Fuijkschot, 2006)
- Messiah Complex (art by Eduardo Ocana, 2006)
- Adam in Chromaland (art by Luigi Giammarino, 2007)
- Archie vs. Predator (art by Fernando Ruiz, 4-issue mini-series, 2015)
- "Desiderium" (short story), Whose Future is It?, chapter 13 (2018)
- Archie vs. Predator II (art by Robert Hack, 5-issue mini-series, 2019)
- Bad Karma (Panel Syndicate) (art by Ryan Howe and Dee Cunniffe, 2020)
- Full Tilt Boogie (art by Eduardo Ocana, series in 2000 AD #2130, #2185-2194, #2367-2377, and #2418-2425, 2019-25)
- Rogue Trooper: Ghost Patrol (art by Neil Edwards, colours by Matt Soffe, letters by Jim Campbell and Rob Steen, series in 2000 AD #2450-2463, collected in book form in June 2026)

=== Videography ===
- "Leeds United" – Amanda Palmer (Roadrunner) Aug 2008
- "Last Words" – The Real Tuesday Weld (Six Degrees) Oct 2008
- "Guilty Pleasure" – Manda Rin (ThisisfakeDIY) Oct 2008
- "Lighthouse" – The Duloks (unsigned) – Aug 2008
- "Book of Lies" – Flipron (Tiny Dog) Jul 2008
- "These Eyes" – Martin/Towers (Northstar Records) Feb 2008
- "Jilted" – The Puppini Sisters (Universal) Jan 2008
- "(I Can't Believe I'm Not A) Millionaire" A-side and B-side versions – The Puppini Sisters (Universal) Jan 2008
- "Pretty Little Miss Dysmorphia" – Des O'Connor (unsigned) Jan 2008
- "Apart of Me" – The Real Tuesday Weld feat The Puppini Sisters (Six Degrees) Oct 2007
- "Those Rules" – The Schema (unsigned) Aug 2007
- "Why Dogs Howl at the Moon" – Thomas Truax (ST Records) Jul 2007
- "Dogboy vs Monsters" – Flipron (Tiny Dog) Mar 2007
- "Raindrops Keep Falling on the Dead" – Flipron (Tiny Dog) May 2006
