= 100 Bullets (video game) =

- The Acclaim game is played from the third person perspective and combat included taking hostages.
- Developer: Acclaim Studios Austin
- Publisher: Acclaim Entertainment
- Platforms: PlayStation 2, Xbox
- Release: Cancelled
- Genre: Action
- Mode: Single-player

The 100 Bullets video games were cancelled adaptations of the comic book series of the same name, which was created by Brian Azzarello. The first cancelled title was to be developed by Acclaim Studios Austin and published by Acclaim Entertainment. It was planned to release for the PlayStation 2 and Xbox in October 2004. It would star two characters: Cole Burns (a character from the comic), and Snow Falls, a character created for the video game and designed by Azzarello. Eduardo Risso (another figure involved in the comic) was responsible for the art direction. Key gameplay mechanics revealed include an auto-aim system that rewards players for patience, a "rage meter" that when full allows players to kill all enemies nearby, and the ability to use enemies as human shields. The game was cancelled following Acclaim's financial problems and closure.

== Gameplay and premise ==
Both incarnations of the 100 Bullets video games are an adaptation of the comic of the same name produced by DC Comics and Vertigo. In the Acclaim Entertainment-published game, players would control Cole Burns, a character from the comic. The game was to introduce a new playable character named Snow Falls. The plot was especially created for the video game. Its gameplay has been compared to other shooter video games including Halo, Max Payne, and Minority Report: Everybody Runs. Players would be offered a selection of weapons, which include pistols, a grenade launcher, a shotgun, and a rifle. The game would have had a "rage meter" that would grow as players kill enemies; when it is full, it would kill all enemies on screen. The developers were planning to feature an auto-aim system that would cause the players' crosshair to stick to an enemy for a short amount of time. Players who wait longer will be able to target more vulnerable areas of their enemies. Players would also be able to use enemies as human shields.

== Development ==
DC Comics conducted a deal with publisher Acclaim Entertainment in June 2003 to produce games based on the 100 Bullets comic book. 100 Bullets was in development by Acclaim Studios Austin. The game's art was designed by Eduardo Risso, who also worked on the comic. The character of Snow Falls was created by the comic's creator Brian Azzarello. A stated goal of Acclaim's was to "challenge players to 'think before they shoot' and allow them to explore the moral implications of their actions". It was featured at the 2004 E3 convention. It was slated to release in October 2004, but was cancelled following Acclaim Entertainment's financial troubles.

A deal established between Warner Bros. Entertainment and D3 Publisher of America in May 2006 gave D3 the rights to adapt the comic into video games on home game consoles, handheld game consoles, and PCs. Its first release was planned for Q3 2007. Careen Yapp (Vice president of licensing and business development for D3) was positive about the project and noted that the publisher would try to "maintain the authenticity consumers demand". It was planned for release on Game Boy Advance, Nintendo DS, PC, PlayStation 3, Xbox 360, PlayStation Portable, and Wii. D3 did not comment on the project for years; a rumour surfaced when a "GameStop insider" stated that it would release in 2009 on the PlayStation 3 and Xbox 360. A spokesperson for D3 could not give anymore details due to the game being built from the ground up. All releases of this game excepting the Xbox 360 and Wii versions (which are labelled TBA or "to be announced") have been cancelled. D3 no longer features 100 Bullets on its list of video games.

When asked for news on the project, Azzarello noted that it was dead and if it was picked up, he expected to be a consultant. He expressed optimism that the comic could be adapted to a video game. He stated in an interview that he was never looking to adapt 100 Bullets into a video game and only took the opportunity to make one to "see what happens". He felt that the story didn't adapt well to a video game. He later noted that while there was "still talk", he didn't expect that it would happen anymore, also stating that it was "a little too intense to get off the ground".

== Reception ==
Both the idea of an adaptation of 100 Bullets and the demo version of the Acclaim Entertainment adaptation have been met with positive reception. Brad Shoemaker's hands-on impressions for GameSpot of its E3 2004 build were generally positive. He praised its improvements over the previous build he saw, such as destructible environments and more finalized art. He felt that it was a good comic to adapt to a video game. Ricardo Torres found the human shield mechanic entertaining and felt that the graphics were well-done. Jeremy Dunham felt that its faithfulness to the comic's style was "dead on". Siliconera's Spencer felt thankful that the project was revived by D3 and called the comic series a "great property". Ben Reeves expressed hope that the D3-produced video game would fare better than the Acclaim-produced one. Justin McElroy expressed disappointment that the two adaptations of 100 Bullets have not had any luck at getting a release.
