= Hardway =

Hardway may refer to:

== Places ==
- Hardway, Hampshire, a village and suburb of the town and borough of Gosport in Hampshire, England
- Hardway, Somerset, a location in England

== Music ==
- Jay Hardway (born 1991), Dutch DJ and music producer
- Martin Zellar and The Hardways, an American band
- "The Hardway", a song by DC Talk from the album Free at Last

== Others ==
- Hardway, one of the three cleavage planes of granite

== See also ==
- The Hard Way (disambiguation), including uses of "Hard Way"
- Hardaway, surname
