= Spaceman (comics) =

- The cover of Spaceman #1

Publication information
- Publisher: Vertigo
- Schedule: Monthly
- Format: Limited series
- Genre: Science fiction
- Publication date: October 2011 – August 2012
- No. of issues: 9

Creative team
- Written by: Brian Azzarello
- Penciller: Eduardo Risso
- Letterer: Clem Robins
- Colorist(s): Patricia Mulvihill; Giulia Brusco

Spaceman is a nine-issue, science fiction comic book miniseries written by Brian Azzarello, illustrated by Eduardo Risso, and published by Vertigo. Azzarello and Risso previously collaborated for more than ten years on the Vertigo series 100 Bullets, as well as other projects such as the Flashpoint miniseries Batman: Knight of Vengeance.

== Plot ==
Set in a post-apocalyptic near future, Spaceman tells the story of Orson, a hulking, lonely man who was genetically engineered by NASA to sustain long-term space flight. Flashbacks show Orson and other engineered participants of the project living and working on Mars. After NASA shuts down, however, Orson lives alone on Earth, salvaging scrap metal for a living. That is, until he finds himself at the center of a celebrity child kidnapping case.

== Development ==
Azzarello got the initial inspiration for the series from a conversation he had in a bar with a bioengineering professor from Northwestern University about the possibility of traveling to Mars. The engineer told him that it was currently impossible, because the human skeletal structure could not withstand that much time in space. When Azzarello suggested that children be bioengineered to have thicker bones, he conceived Orson, the main character of the series, and then began to build a world around him. In preparation for the series, Azzarello spent years doing research.

According to Azzarello, he first invited Risso to work with him on Spaceman, and three other stories he was planning to pitch, when the two were talking in a New York bar, probably during a farewell party for 100 Bullets. Risso immediately agreed, and all four stories were accepted when Azzarello pitched the ideas to a Vertigo representative. Spaceman is the first to be released.

== Publication and credits ==
An eight-page prelude to Spaceman was included in Strange Adventures #1, released by Vertigo on May 25, 2011. Spaceman #1 was later released by Vertigo on October 26. The first issue sold for $1.

Spaceman features coloring by Patricia Mulvihill and Giulia Brusco, lettering by Clem Robins, and cover artwork by Dave Johnson. Johnson, Mulvihill and Robins all previously worked with Azzarello and Risso on 100 Bullets.

== Reception ==
The crowd at a Vertigo panel discussion at the New York Comic Con in October 2011 enthusiastically applauded the new series.

IGN reviewer Joey Esposito gave the first issue of Spaceman an 8.5/10, adding that "Spaceman No. 1 is unlike anything you'll read this week, let alone all year long". The Outhouse also praised the issue, calling it "a deep, dense comic that's absolutely thrilling to read". Chad Nevett, reviewing the issue for Comic Book Resources, made special issue of the price, ending the review: "With the first issue priced at only a dollar, how can you not give it a shot?" James Fulton of Comics Nexus named the issue as best comic of the week. Cyriaque Lamar of io9 called the series one of the best science fiction comics of 2011.

Oliver Sava of The A.V. Club praised Spaceman on the whole, though thought it did not reach the quality of Azzarello and Risso's 100 Bullets. Sava found the story strong but the dialogue distracting, noting that while the intent to show "how language has degraded along with everything else in the world" was clear, "its effect is questionable". Sava had more praise for Risso's art for creating a "fully realized world" with "incredibly expressive" characters, which he thought was alone worth the $1 cover price.
