= Archie vs. Predator II =

2019 American comic book

- Cover to issue #1; Art by Robert Hack

Publication information
- Publisher: Dark Horse Comics; Archie Comics
- Publication date: July 2019 – January 2020
- No. of issues: 5
- Main character(s): Archie Andrews; Betty Cooper; Veronica Lodge; Predator

Creative team
- Written by: Alex de Campi
- Penciller(s): Robert Hack
- Letterer(s): Jack Morelli
- Colorist(s): Kelly Fitzpatrick

Archie vs. Predator II is a comic book and intercompany crossover, written by Alex de Campi and drawn by Robert Hack. Published as a five-issue limited series in the United States by Dark Horse Comics and Archie Comics, it is a sequel to the 2015 comic Archie vs. Predator, again written by de Campi, and a crossover between the continuities of the original 1942–2015 and rebooted 2015–2018 Archie Comics series, serving as a series finale to both series' storylines and its versions of Archie Andrews, Betty Cooper, and Veronica Lodge ahead of the relaunch of the original continuity. The first issue was released July 24, 2019, and the last on January 22, 2020.

== Synopsis ==
In a valiant attempt to undo the grievous loss of their cherished friends, Betty and Veronica take Archie (resurrected as a polymorphed Predator) to Memory Lane in order to alter the past and restore the Archie Comics status quo, only to find it converted into a construction site. Despondent, the two girls and the Archie-Predator leave Riverdale, only to find themselves back in Riverdale in an alternate universe reboot, where their friends are still alive and about to go to a Halloween party. Dilton, costumed as a Predator, announces that he has found a way of tapping into alternate realities; but as he activates the device in his helmet, an army of Predators intercept its signal and trace it to Earth, leading to chaos as Betty, Veronica, and Archie seek to come to terms with their place in the world, establishing a polyamorous relationship and re-contacting "Mister Inferno", to whom they both once promised their souls.

== Reception ==
Archie vs. Predator II was well received by critics scoring an average rating of 8.0 for the entire series based on 21 critic reviews aggregated by Comic Book Roundup.
