= Jackie Estrada =

American, known for association with comic books

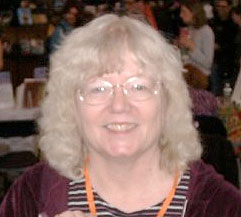
- Estrada, photographed at the 2004 Alternative Press Expo (APE) in San Francisco
- Born: September 10, 1946 (age 80)
- Areas: Editor, Publisher, Letterer
- Notable works: Exhibit A Press
- Awards: Harvey Award; Inkpot Award (1977)

Jackie Estrada (born September 10, 1946) is an American comic-book convention organizer, book editor, co-publisher of Exhibit A Press, administrator of the Will Eisner Comic Industry Awards, and past president of Friends of Lulu.

A San Diego resident since the 1950s, Estrada got involved in helping to put on San Diego Comic-Con in the mid-1970s. In addition to having edited nine of the convention's program books over the years, she helped start the Robert A. Heinlein annual blood drive, created the position of pro liaison, and created (and was the first coordinator of) artists’ alley at Comic-Con. She has been administrator of the Eisner Awards (the "Oscars" of the comics industry) since 1990, and she chairs the Con's guest committee and awards committee.

As a professional editor, Estrada has edited hundreds of books, the majority of them college texts. Most recently she edited Comics: Between the Panels, a lavish four-color coffee table book from Dark Horse Comics. The book features more than one hundred of her photos, taken of various comics professionals over the past twenty-plus years. Estrada was one of the founders of the San Diego Professional Editors’ Network (SD/PEN), and has taught editing at the University of California, San Diego.

With husband Batton Lash, Estrada co-founded Exhibit A Press in 1994 to publish Lash's comic book, Wolff & Byrd, Counselors of the Macabre (now called Supernatural Law). Estrada edits all of the company's comics and books, does the lettering for the comic book, and handles the public relations.

In 2011, Estrada complained that she and her husband Batton Lash were the targets of abuse and threats after cartoons by her husband appearing on BigGovernment were criticized for being racist attacks against President Obama and first lady Michelle Obama.

In early 2014 Estrada ran a successful Kickstarter campaign to publish Comic Book People: Photographs from the 1970s and 1980s, a hardcover book published by Exhibit A Press featuring her photos from that period. The book was released in September 2014. In 2015, she ran a second successful Kickstarter campaign to finance another book of photographs from the 1990s.

In 2018, the Harvey Awards honored her with their first annual Comics Industry Pioneer Award.
