= Patricia Mulvihill =

American colorist

- Area: Colourist
- Notable works: 100 Bullets
- Awards: 2004 "Best Colorist" Eisner Award

Patricia 'Trish' Mulvihill is a New York City-based colorist who has worked in the comics industry, working on Batman, 100 Bullets, Wonder Woman, and many other comics. In 2004, she won the Eisner Award for Best Colorist. Mulvihill started in comics at the age of 28. Mulvihill's first job for DC Comics was on Wonder Woman.

== Bibliography ==
Mulvihill's work as a colorist includes:

DC Comics

- Batman
  - Vol 1 #572: "Jurisprudence, Part One" (1999)
  - Vol 1 #620-625: "Broken City" (2003–2004)
- Batman and Captain America Vol 1 (1996)
- Darkstars #10, 15, 16 (1993)
- Firebrand Vol. 1 #1-5, 7-9 (1996)
- Flashpoint Beyond (2022)
- Gotham Girls Vol 1 #1-5(2002–2003)
- Nightwing #41-48, 52, 54-56, 59 (2000–2002)
- Superman & Bugs Bunny (2000)
- The Spirit #26, 27, 31, 32 (with Brian Bolland, Gene Ha, 2007)
- The Spirit Book 5 (with Patricia Mulvihill, Kevin Nowlan, Gene Ha, Nick Cardy, Brian Bolland, Paul Rivoche, 2010)
- Wonder Woman #78-196 (1993–2003)

Vertigo

- Lady Constantine #1-4 (2003)
- Spaceman (with Dave Johnson and Giulia Brusco, 2011)
- 100 Bullets #15-100 (2000-2009)

== Awards ==
Awards Mulvihill has won or been nominated for include:

- 1995: Won the "Best Achievement by a Colorist" Don Thompson Award
- 1996: Won the "Best Achievement by a Colorist" Don Thompson Award
- 1997: Nominated for the "Best Colorist" Eisner Award, for Wonder Woman, Firebrand and Batman/Captain America
- 2001: Nominated for the "Best Colorist" Eisner Award, for 100 Bullets
- 2002: Nominated for the "Best Colorist" Eisner Award, for Wonder Woman and 100 Bullets
- 2003: Nominated for the "Best Colorist" Eisner Award, for Gotham Girls, Wonder Woman, 100 Bullets, and Lady Constantine
- 2004: Won the "Best Colorist" Eisner Award, for Batman, Wonder Woman and 100 Bullets
- 2005: Nominated for the "Best Colorist" Harvey Award, for 100 Bullets
- 2006: Nominated for the "Best Colorist" Harvey Award, for 100 Bullets
- 2009: Nominated for the "Best Coloring" Eisner Award, for 100 Bullets (Vertigo/DC), Joker (DC)
