= Archie Meets the Punisher =

1994 one-shot crossover comic book

- Cover to Archie Meets the Punisher (Archie Comics version). Art by Stan Goldberg and Henry Scarpelli.

Publication information
- Publisher: Archie Comics; Marvel Comics
- Genre: Humor/comedy, superhero
- Publication date: August 1994

Creative team
- Written by: Batton Lash
- Artist(s): Stan Goldberg; John Buscema
- Inker: Tom Palmer
- Letterer: Jack Morelli
- Colorist: Barry Grossman

Archie Meets the Punisher or The Punisher Meets Archie is a one-shot comic book and intercompany crossover written by Batton Lash with art by Stan Goldberg, John Buscema, and Tom Palmer. It was published jointly by Archie Comics and Marvel Comics in June 1994. In the story, the murderous vigilante Punisher mistakes all-American teenager Archie Andrews for a criminal that he is hunting. When he realizes his error, he works with Archie to rescue Archie's girlfriend Veronica Lodge, who has been kidnapped by the criminal. Despite being a humorous intercompany crossover, the comic was said to take place in the mainstream Marvel Universe by The Official Handbook of the Marvel Universe.

Lash developed the plot based on a suggestion from Archie editor Victor Gorelick. The script was written with the intention of remaining true to the spirit of both characters rather than focus only on Archie's humor or the Punisher's action. Gorelick submitted the proposal to Marvel editors for review, and they agreed to move forward with the project. To help preserve the different tones, Archie artist Goldberg and Marvel artist Buscema worked together on the pencil artwork with each only drawing characters and settings for their respective company. Palmer provided inks for both artists to help smooth the differences between their styles. The comic book was kept secret inside both companies until it was announced at a press function shortly before its publication. Two versions were printed, one by each company. The versions had different cover art and the publishing company put the name of their character first in the title.

Although news outlets and critics initially believed the announcement was a joke, Archie Meets the Punisher received mostly positive responses. Many critics praised the odd pairing as an interesting narrative hook. Because of its success, Marvel participated in more crossovers with other publishing companies and Archie began a tradition of meeting unexpected guest stars such as Kiss, Sharknado, and the Predator.

== Publication history ==
=== Background ===
All-American teenager Archie Andrews first appeared in a backup feature in the adventure comic Pep Comics #22, published by MLJ Magazines in December 1941. Archie was popular enough to receive a dedicated monthly comic series less than a year after his debut. This started a trend of teen humor comic books and the publisher renamed itself after the character in 1947. By the early 1950s, the character's appeal warranted seven concurrent monthly comic titles. Over the next four decades, Archie Comics Publications rarely published material outside the teen humor genre, and most of its attempts to do so were short-lived and commercially unsuccessful. By the 1990s, Archie had a strong presence in magazine outlets such as supermarkets, but was struggling in comic specialty shops where the clientele was more interested in adventure stories.

The murderous vigilante the Punisher first appeared as an antagonist in The Amazing Spider-Man #129, published by Marvel Comics in February 1974. Fans found the character interesting and he continued to guest star in other Marvel comics. In 1987, Marvel gave him an ongoing series, The Punisher, which became one of Marvel's biggest successes of the decade. By the mid-1990s, Punisher had become one of Marvel's most popular characters and was appearing in three concurrent monthly comic titles.

=== Development ===
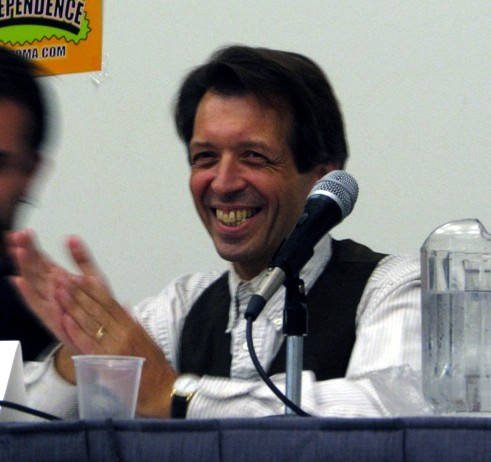
Writer Batton Lash in 2007

During the 1990s, intercompany crossovers were a popular trend in the American comic book industry and management at Archie Comics wanted to participate to raise its visibility in specialty comic shops and boost sales. During a lunch in San Diego, top Archie editor Victor Gorelick discussed possibilities with writers Batton Lash and David Scroggy. After considering crossovers with Superman's friend Jimmy Olsen or Spider-Man, Gorelick mentioned the Punisher as a joke. Lash immediately saw potential in the idea and gave a rough explanation for how it would work. Gorelick liked the pitch and asked for a formal proposal. Lash did not think Gorelick's interest was sincere and forgot about it until he received a follow-up phone call sometime later asking if the proposal was ready. (Note: Lash described the time period between the lunch and the follow-up call differently in different interviews. In 2015, he said it was a week, but in 2018, he said it was a month.)

The origin of the concept is unclear. In 1994, Hero Illustrated reported the idea was first proposed by a fan at San Diego Comic-Con. Other sources, such as the 2013 book Icons of the American Comic Book, have said it was inspired by a gag on the cover of an issue of the trade publication The Comics Journal. Comic Book Resources calls this a legend and claims a meeting between Archie and Punisher was a long-running joke between Gorelick and his friend Tom DeFalco, Marvel's editor-in-chief. In his introduction to the comic book, Gorelick claims to have pitched a different version of the story to Archie publishers Richard Goldwater and Michael Skilberkleit prior to mentioning the idea to Lash. (Note: The original concept involved Archie's parents being murdered, leading him to ask the Punisher for help in avenging them.) Reed Tucker wrote in his 2017 book Slugfest that it was conceived by Gorelick and Punisher editor Dan Daley. Lash gives credit for the idea solely to Gorelick.

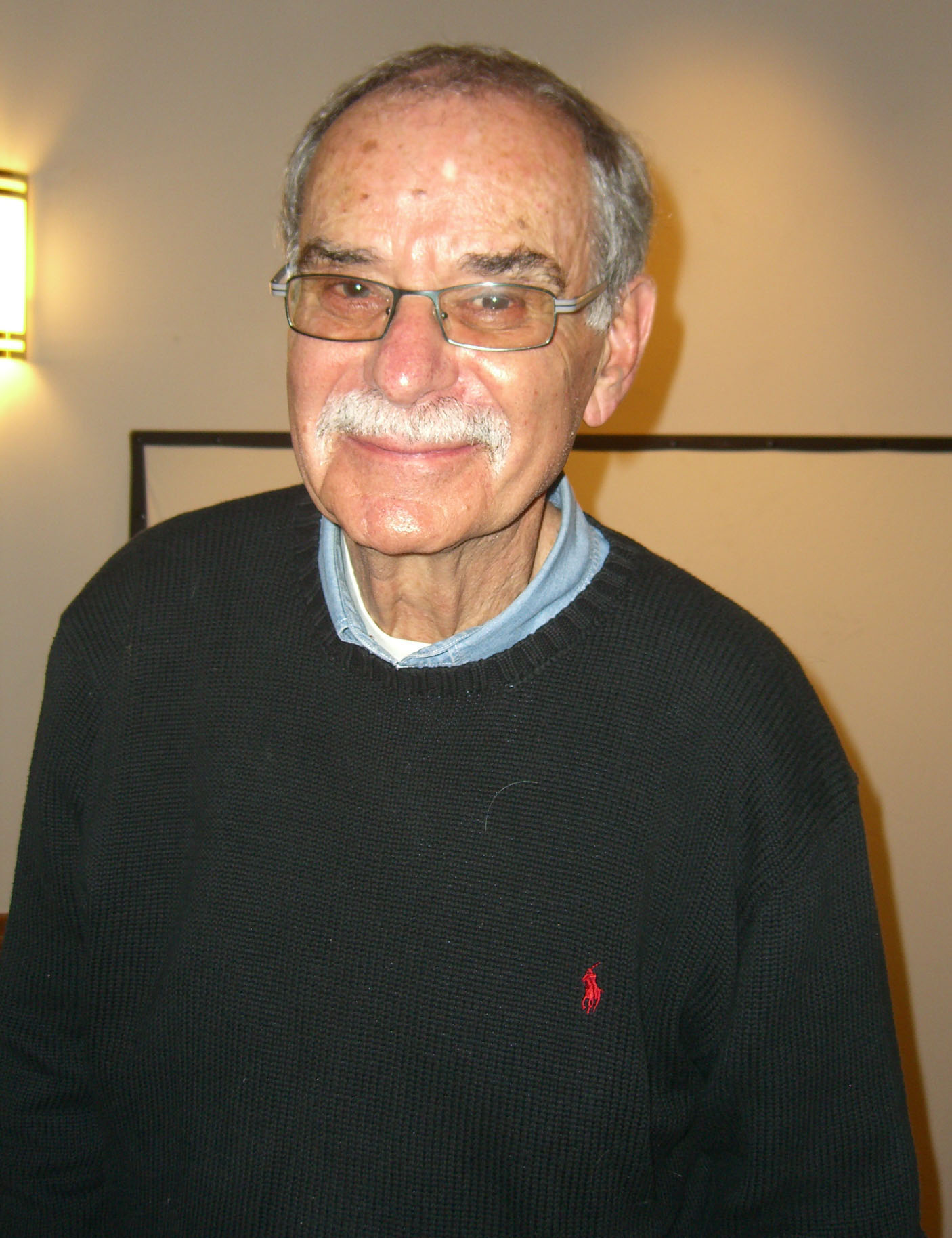
Artist Stan Goldberg in 2008

Lash's original outline was about one page long. Prior to this comic book, Lash had not written either character, and was not a fan of the Punisher. He modeled it on the 1948 film Abbott and Costello Meet Frankenstein, which he felt was true to the spirit of both the comedy team and the horror monsters that it featured. Gorelick sent the proposal to DeFalco, who shared it with Daley and Mark Gruenwald, another editor. It was Marvel's first intercompany crossover in years. Fearing the project might be derailed if too many people learned about it, only seven people at Marvel were told about the crossover, which was referred to internally as "Project A". (Note: The seven were DeFalco, Gruenwald, Daley, inker Tom Palmer, letterer Jack Morelli, publisher Mike Hobson, and president Terry Stewart.) It was formally announced at a press function at the Empire Diner in New York City shortly before publication. The novelty of the unlikely crossover drew attention from general news media, and NPR aired an interview between Weekend Edition host Scott Simon and Lash on Saturday, July 9, 1994 discussing the project.

The artwork was split between regular Archie penciller Stan Goldberg and longtime Marvel artist John Buscema. Each artist was responsible for drawing the characters and backgrounds associated with their company's intellectual property, ensuring the characters' appearances remained true to their traditional styles. Tom Palmer did the inking for both artists to prevent the two styles from clashing. Goldberg liked the art arrangement because he had always been a fan of Buscema. The only editorial interference came from Gorelick, who objected to the Punisher shooting a thug during a school dance. The scene was changed to have the Punisher hit the thug with a cake instead.

=== Publication ===
In June 1994, two versions of the comic book were published with an August 1994 cover date. One was published by Archie with cover copy reading Archie Meets the Punisher and a $2.95 retail price (with an accompanying $3.75 edition distributed on Canadian newsstands). The other, published by Marvel, was titled The Punisher Meets Archie. The Marvel version featured a cover enhanced with a die-cut window and a design that paid homage to the cover of Amazing Spider-Man #129. It had a retail price of $3.95. Both versions contained the same 48-page interior story and were ad-free except for two subscription offers, one from each company. The Marvel edition also included the pencil artwork for the Archie edition and a bonus pin-up image of the Punisher and Archie. (Note: The die-cut cover required an additional page to function properly, giving Marvel the space for the extra material.)

== Plot ==
When a drug smuggler known as "Red" becomes a fugitive after agreeing to turn state's evidence to the United States government, the government asks the Punisher to locate and return him alive. Red escapes from the Punisher in New York City, fleeing to Riverdale, where he adopts a new alias and uses his legitimate business interests to take shelter at the home of wealthy industrialist Hiram Lodge, who is unaware of Red's criminal history. Red draws the attention of Hiram's teenage daughter Veronica because his appearance is very similar to her frequent suitor, Archie Andrews. To get back at Archie for accidentally ruining their date to the school dance that night, Veronica asks Red to take her instead.

Meanwhile, the Punisher and his partner Microchip track Red to Riverdale and are cynical about the town's innocent demeanor. They see Archie with his friend Jughead Jones in an ice cream shop and believe him to be Red. While they are observing him, some thugs from New York arrive and make the same mistake. The thugs know about Red's deal with the government and intend to kill him before he can testify. They abduct Archie and Jughead, prompting a car chase as the Punisher attempts to rescue "Red". After a car wreck, the Punisher quickly realizes his error and lets Archie go. The Punisher and Microchip continue to secretly monitor Archie, hoping the remaining thugs will make the same mistake and come into the open.

As Red and Veronica arrive at the school dance, Red is recognized by a stage worker and low-level drug dealer who, hoping to improve his standing among the cartel, calls them and tells them where to find Red. The Punisher and Microchip, who have been monitoring the cartel, also head for the dance. Meanwhile, Archie is told Veronica went to the dance with someone who looks like him, and realizing that she is with a criminal, he too goes to the dance.

The Punisher sneaks into the school and realizes Riverdale truly is as innocent as it appears. Determined to prevent it from being corrupted by Red or other forces, he disguises himself as a chaperone and, while looking for Red, identifies the thugs, who have dressed up as caterers. As Archie arrives, the thugs mistake him for Red again and move in to kill him. The Punisher uses non-lethal methods to disarm and incapacitate them and clears the misunderstanding with Archie, but Red escapes with Veronica as a hostage.

Red forces Veronica to call her father for ransom, but she takes the opportunity to use code words to let Archie know that she's being held in a specific warehouse. Archie and his friends accompany the Punisher to rescue her. At the warehouse, the Punisher reveals to Red that the informant who called the cartel to the dance has agreed to testify and Red is no longer needed alive. During the subsequent scuffle, Red accidentally triggers the automatic doors that open the warehouse roof and gets his foot tangled in a rope attached to a large parade balloon. As the balloon floats away with Red attached, the Punisher considers killing him, but does not. Before leaving Riverdale for Gotham City the next morning, the Punisher and Microchip say goodbye to Archie and his friends.

== Critical reception ==
Many people thought the crossover was a joke when it was first announced, but it was surprisingly successful. Most critics cited contrasting characters as an appealing element, with Pop Matters calling the combination a "captivating storytelling device" that made for a "remarkable Punisher story and a fitting Archie story". That sentiment was shared by Hero Illustrated and Comic Book Resources, with the latter going on to call the portrayal of Riverdale as a "bastion of innocence" that needed the Punisher's non-lethal protection "brilliant". The combination of artwork by Goldberg and Buscema heightened "the clashing sensibilities and themes" for Pop Matters, concluding its review by calling Archie Meets the Punisher "the best crossover in the history of the comic medium". Critical Blast found some parts of the story to be "surprisingly serious", but Comic Book Resources thought the constant slapstick comedy prevented the comic from being anything but a novelty.

=== Legacy ===
Since Archie Meets the Punisher, the Archie characters have had a tradition of team-ups with characters from other fictional universes, such as Archie Meets Kiss (2012), Archie Meets Glee (2013), and Archie vs. Sharknado (2015). Geek.com felt that Archie Meets the Punisher was the gold standard for unlikely crossovers until being replaced by Archie vs. Predator in 2015. Marvel also continued with intercompany crossovers, starting with a meeting between the Punisher and the DC Comics character Batman in August 1994. In 2017, Tucker said that Archie Meets the Punisher remained one of Marvel's most left-field books.

The comic continued to surprise readers decades after it was published. As late as 2015, young fans and fans new to comics would still ask Lash if the comic really existed.
