= Archie vs. Predator =

2015 American comic book

- Cover of Archie vs. Predator #1; art by Fernando Ruiz

Publication information
- Publisher: Dark Horse Comics; Archie Comics
- Publication date: April – July 2015
- No. of issues: 4
- Main characters: Archie Andrews; Betty Cooper; Veronica Lodge; Predator

Creative team
- Written by: Alex de Campi
- Artist: Fernando Ruiz
- Penciller: Fernando Ruiz
- Inker: Rick Koslowski
- Letterer: John Workman
- Colorist: Jason Millet

Collected editions
- Hard Cover: ISBN 1616558059
- Soft cover: ISBN 1506714668

Archie vs. Predator is a comic book and intercompany crossover, written by Alex de Campi and drawn by Fernando Ruiz. It was originally published as a four-issue limited series in the United States by Dark Horse Comics and Archie Comics in 2015. The single issues were released between April and July, a hardcover collection went on sale in November 2015, and a paperback collection became available in August 2019.

Following in a long tradition of 'all-American' teenager Archie Andrews meeting unusual celebrities and pop culture icons, this comic book shows him meeting 'the galaxy's deadliest hunter', the Predator. The idea was first suggested in the Archie office and then proposed to Dark Horse, which holds the license to comics featuring the Predator character owned by 20th Century Fox. The companies paired de Campi, a horror writer at Dark Horse, with Ruiz, a regular Archie artist. When the comic book was announced, many media outlets noted in their headlines that the new title was not a joke.

In Archie vs. Predator, a trophy-hunting alien arrives on Earth and begins stalking high school student Archie Andrews and his classmates. After a number of teenagers have been murdered, the survivors realize they are being hunted and decide to fight back.

The book received positive reviews from critics, who enjoyed the strange crossover matchup and dark humor. The miniseries was the bestselling book for both publishers during its release and won a Ghastly Award for Best Limited Series. A sequel, Archie vs. Predator II, was published from July 2019 to January 2020, again written by de Campi and illustrated by Robert Hack.

== Publication history ==
=== Development ===
Since Archie Comics partnered with Marvel Comics for the 1994 one-shot comic Archie Meets the Punisher, the Archie characters have had a tradition of team-ups with characters from other fictional universes. Following the success of Archie meets Kiss in 2012 and Archie meets Glee in 2013, the Archie Creative Summit held in March 2014 included a brainstorming session for new crossovers. Godzilla and Friday the 13th were considered, but the Predator received the most support. Artist Fernando Ruiz was at the summit and liked the premise, but did not believe it would actually be made, or that he would be involved if it was.

Archie Comics proposed the crossover to 20th Century Fox, who owns the Predator character, and Dark Horse Comics, who had licensed the character for comic books. Both quickly agreed. Dark Horse approached Alex de Campi to write based on her work on the horror comic book Grindhouse and the humorous comic book My Little Pony: Friends Forever. Dark Horse editor Brendan Wright, who was already editing the regular Predator comic book and had previously coordinated with Archie Comics on Dark Horse's Archie Archives reprints, was chosen as editor. Ruiz was the first and only artist considered to pencil the series, and inker Rich Koslowski was selected based on his work with Ruiz on a Thor parody in Archie #648. The project was originally titled Archie meets Predator, but it was changed to vs. because the people involved in production kept calling it that unintentionally, and to parody the Alien vs. Predator franchise.

To prepare for the project, de Campi read over 4000 pages of Archie comic books. She drew inspiration for the story from the 1940s era of the series, when she says Archie Andrews' girlfriends Betty Cooper and Veronica Lodge had "more edge". Her scripts were subject to notes and tweaks from Archie Comics and Fox, but de Campi described both licensors as "extremely mellow, pleasant and easy to work with". Fox's primary concern was why the Predator, who is known for choosing challenging prey, would be interested in teenagers, but a suitable explanation was included in the story. She expected some of the notes, such as being told she "can't make jokes about child predation in an Archie book". Other times, she was surprised when she did not receive notes, such as her use of emojis for the Predator's speech. She was pleased when she got to add depth to Dilton Doiley, a character she feels is often overlooked in regular Archie comics. The choice of whether Archie Andrews would survive the series or not was changed several times during scripting, and a final decision was not made until the last draft of the script.

Ruiz experimented with drawing the whole series in a more realistic manner, but from the beginning, the plan was to use the traditional Archie design style for the book, which Archie veteran Dan DeCarlo popularized in the classic comics since the 1960s. The editorial team felt this would make the story feel more "bizarre and unsettling". Although most modern comic art is created using digital tools and scans to accelerate the creation process, the art team for Archie vs. Predator chose to use traditional methods and used FedEx to get the physical copy of each page to the person who would complete the next step in the process.

Archie Comics and Dark Horse Comics jointly announced Archie vs. Predator and its creative team at the 2014 New York Comic Con. Soon after, many media outlets carrying the news used a headline indicating the bizarre announcement was not a joke. Wright described it as his "most nutso project" and was continually surprised by the scale of positive reaction to it.

=== Publication ===
A promotional ashcan comic was released a couple of months before the first issue. It featured eight pages from the first issue and some of Ruiz's character designs, including some of his initial, more lifelike Predator sketches. The four issues were published monthly beginning April 15, 2015, and ending July 22, 2015. Each issue had two variant covers, and the first issue had some additional store-exclusive and convention-exclusive covers. All of the issues also included a one-page, humorous bonus strip written by de Campi featuring crossovers of other Archie and Dark Horse characters: Sabrina Meets Hellboy (art by Robert Hack), Little Mask and his Pals (art by Art Baltazar), Jughead Meets MIND MGMT: "S" is for Sleeper (art by Matt Kindt), and Josie and the Pussycats Meet Finder (art by Carla Speed McNeil). A 128-page hardcover collecting the series and bonus content was released November 4, 2015, followed by a 104-page softcover edition on August 21, 2019.

== Synopsis ==
When Archie and his friends take a spring break trip to Los Perdidos Resort, an alien, trophy-hunting Predator touches down in the nearby jungle. Betty and Veronica get into a fight during a contest and attract the attention of the Predator, who follows them home to Riverdale. While targeting Veronica, the Predator also kills several armed people. The creature's picture is taken by Betty. Kevin Keller's father, a US Military General, identifies it as a teenager from a race of nearly unstoppable alien hunters. The Kellers organize Archie's friends, and Jughead Jones is used as bait to lure the Predator, but the trap fails and the Predator kills most of the ambush party.

Some members of the group decide to split up in hopes the Predator will continue to pursue Veronica, allowing them to escape, while Archie, Betty, Jughead, and Dilton stay with Veronica. When the Predator attacks again, it kills Dilton and Jughead and critically wounds Archie. Betty and Veronica take refuge at Lodge Manor, where they hook Archie to an experimental healing machine. When the Predator attacks, Archie is killed and Veronica and Betty are critically wounded, which causes the Predator to show regret since it was motivated by a crush on Betty. Veronica recovers to find that Betty has used the healing machine to restore them both to full health and is now using it to transform the Predator into an Archie look-alike.

== Reception ==
The first issue was the best-selling issue for both publishers in April 2015, and the 74th best selling comic book among other releases that month. Sales numbers fell just under 30% through the fourth issue, which was the 102nd best selling issue in July. When the hardcover was released in November, it was the 36th best-selling comics collection of the month according to Diamond Comic Distributors.

The first issue garnered an average review rating of 7.9 out of 10 according to the review aggregator Comic Book Roundup. Writing for The Guardian, Graeme Virtue said the "appealingly strange" series fit with Archie Comics' reputation for pushing comics forward and praised it for remaining true to both the Archie and Predator properties. The book's "deeply funny dark humor" was a selling point for Robin Parrish at Tech Times, and IGN reviewer Jeff Lake described the first issue as "pretty darn great". The use of the traditional cartoon art style to depict gruesome scenes was described as "a visual loss of innocence" by Paste magazine. Comic Bastards's Dustin Cabeal called the miniseries "a hoot". The series won the 2015 Ghastly Award for Best Limited Series.
