= List of 100 Bullets characters =

100 Bullets is a fictional crime drama published by Vertigo, an imprint of DC Comics. As with other noir and pulp characters, both protagonists and antagonists of 100 Bullets are deeply flawed.

== The Trust ==
=== Notable members ===
==== Augustus Medici ====
First appearing in issue #5, he is Trust's most powerful member. Augustus is the de facto leader of the thirteen families and has plans to bring peace to the rivalries that plague the Trust. Since the death of Daniel Peres, Augustus became even more powerful and has consolidated his position by removing the Peres family from power. Other family heads are now plotting against him. Through Shepherd, Augustus monitored Graves and his schemes, as well as his son. Later events have forced him to deal directly with Graves and accede to Lono's suggestion to pardon Kotias and Vasco for their participation in a failed scheme to assassinate him. It seems that his power is ever increasing, with all the remaining houses dominated by his position. It also seems that he had an agreement with Graves and Vasco about protecting Rothstein. It is eventually revealed that Augustus, Graves and Vasco were the masterminds behind a decades-long plan to assume control of the Trust, a plot which drove most of the series' events and many characters' motives. With the death of Vasco, both Augustus and Graves agreed to a sit down with the remaining houses, with Augustus prepared to discuss the terms of what he termed his "surrender" to the newly aligned Trust power of Megan Dietrich, Tibo Vermeer, and Joan D'Arcy. Augustus then negotiated the appointment of the House of Vasco to Agent Graves, before stepping down to hand the House of Medici to his son, Benito. In issue #100, Benito is killed by the remaining houses, minus Graves. Graves confronts Augustus, stating that he knew his actions would lead to his son's death, but before this can be confirmed, it is revealed that Lono is in Augustus' chair. After Dizzy shoots Lono, Graves executes the unarmed Augustus.

==== Benito Medici ====
First appearing in issue #20, Augustus' son and heir apparent, mentored by Mr. Shepherd, Benito is a spoiled and reckless young man with a seeming excess of luck who is more interested in gambling than in his responsibilities towards life or the future of the Trust. A botched attempt made on his life on the orders of Fulvio Carlito, as well as Mr. Shepherd's death later on, led him to reassess his priorities. He was pursued by Megan Dietrich but appeared enamored of Dizzy Cordova, whom he tracked down to Mexico. There, he spent time living with Dizzy, Wylie Times and Mr. Branch. After his incapacitation at the hands of Victor Ray and an interrogation by Lono, Benito was reminded of his importance within the Medici Family, and to the Trust at large. Returning to the Medici estate in Florida, Benito seemed to have given his future inheritance more thought. He ordered Lono to capture a Minuteman as a gift for his father, but when Lono returned with a beaten and bound Dizzy Cordova, Benito shot Lono in the face, as an attempt to kill his own family's warlord. Benito then tended to Dizzy's injuries. After Javier Vasco's assassination, Augustus returned home to meet with the remaining leaders of the Trust, from the houses of Dietrich, Vermeer and D'Arcy. The meeting resulted in Augustus' removal of himself from power, and the elevation of Benito to head of the House of Medici. Benito was then immediately found strangled and drowned to death in issue #100. Graves claims Benito's death was engineered intentionally by his father and the younger Trust did it, but it is also hinted that Lono killed him in revenge for Benito's shooting his face.

==== Megan Dietrich ====
First appearing in issue #4, she is series' femme fatale; a charming, confident yet deadly member of the Trust. Megan had risen to become the head of the Los Angeles-based Dietrich family, also running the family securities firm following the death of her father. A seemingly staunch supporter of the House of Medici and a close friend of Augustus, Megan had a hidden agenda and was not above murder to protect her own interests, also displaying more than a passing interest in Benito Medici. Megan was shot in an intentionally unsuccessful assassination attempt by Victor in San Diego (in issue #66). Soon after, she consummated a deeper partnership with Augustus Medici, who was able to convince Megan to not seek retribution for the attempt on her life. Megan's relationship with Augustus appeared to be headed towards a possible marriage, but the relationship was terminated by Augustus. Megan then teamed up with Vermeer and D'Arcy as they plotted against Medici and Graves to realign the Trust under her leadership. In issue #99, she was seen seducing Benito (the brand new head of the house of Medici) in the pool where he would be found dead in the next issue. She was shown to be possibly both racist and sexist in issue #100, when she reacted to Graves' naming of Dizzy Cordova as the new Agent of the Minutemen. Megan was killed in an explosion engineered by Cole Burns (which also ultimately claimed his life as well) in issue #100.

==== Roland Dietrich ====
First appearing in issue #69 (in a flashback), Roland was Megan's father and the Head of the House of Dietrich around the time of the Atlantic City incident. He was present in the 1962 meeting at which he and Axel Nagel approved Graves's ascension to the role of Agent and leader of the Minutemen. He voted in favor of the Trust's dissolution of the Minutemen, on the advice of Graves and despite his reservations. Ultimately, this led to his capture and brutal execution at the hands of the Minutemen in Atlantic City.

==== Javier Vasco ====
First appearing in issue #25, Javier Vasco's Seattle-based family has historically been viewed as aggressors within the Trust. They have had problems with the Nagel family which were dealt with by the Minutemen, but a rivalry was still evident. Javier was seemingly quite suspicious of the intentions of the House of Medici in restructuring the Trust and eliminating the Minutemen. He had formed a trio of dissent along with Helena Kotias and Fulvio Carlito, planning to eliminate Augustus Medici with the apparent agreement of Graves, in return for his reinstitution. Javier persuaded Axel Nagel to commit suicide, apparently as a consequence of some obligation. It was recently revealed that Augustus, Graves and Vasco were the masterminds behind a decades-long grand plan that is only now becoming clear, which included Vasco feinting the opposition role. He was eliminated by Will Slaughter in issue #98, who was contracted for the hit by Joan D'Arcy. His House is eventually handed over to Graves in the Trust's realignment.

==== Helena Kotias ====
First appearing in issue #25, based in Aspen, Colorado, Helena was unhappy with the leadership of the Trust. She was part of the alliance between the Kotias, Carlito and Vasco families determined to remove Augustus Medici from power. The trio met with Agent Graves, offering him to reinstitute the Minutemen in exchange for his help. It appeared that Helena was a very close ally of Javier Vasco and Lono even referred to her House as a wing of the House of Vasco. She is killed by Victor in issue #86 along with another Trust head, Constance Von Hagen.

==== Mia Simone ====
First appearing in issue #24, based in Dallas, she was another ally of Medici. Graves considered the Simones to be the weakest of the families of the Trust. Mia was close to both Megan Dietrich and the late Daniel Peres, and seemed dismissive of the aggressive influence of the Vasco family within their organisation. She was killed in issue #76 in a fatal fall mysteriously arranged by Remi Rome.

==== Tibo Vermeer ====
First appearing in issue #25, based in Omaha, Nebraska, it was first speculated that the House of Vermeer was in alliance with the House of Vasco after Vermeer and Javier Vasco approached Lars Nagel in issue #72. Vermeer's true allegiances and motivations are unclear, but seem to be largely based in self-preservation. He was last seen with Megan and D'Arcy, preparing to sit down with Graves and Augustus. He is killed by Cole Burns in issue #100.

==== Daniel Peres ====
First appearing in issue #23, Daniel Peres was a head of the Peres family and powerful within the Trust. During a summit meeting, Peres delivered a message to Augustus Medici from Graves. Peres tried hard to prevent a war between the former close friends, but was killed by Cole Burns in issue #25. The House of Peres was then absorbed by the other then-12 families.

Peres was killed on the same bench in Atlantic City as Mr. Branch would later be.

==== Anwar Madrid ====
First appearing in issue #25, based in New Orleans, Anwar Madrid is the father of Rose Madrid and a supporter of Augustus Medici in the elimination of the Minutemen. Anwar also had a personal ax to grind against the Trust's former soldiers because of Wylie's doomed relationship with Rose and her subsequent death. Wylie Times killed Anwar Madrid (in issue #56) shortly after being reactivated as a Minuteman.

==== Rose Madrid ====
First appearing in issue #52 (in a flashback), daughter of Anwar Madrid and heiress to the House of Madrid, Rose was also secretly romantically involved with Minuteman Wylie Times. This relationship, which broke the rules of both the Trust and the Minutemen, was doomed due to Rose's involvement with a conspiracy against the House of Medici. Rose was executed by Wylie upon Shepherd's orders, causing a rift between the two men. Rose's relationship with Wylie and her death was one of several reasons why the Trust voted in favor of eliminating the Minutemen. It was revealed in a flashback that Rose's plot against Medici was being manipulated by someone within the Trust, which prompted Wylie to agree to Graves' plan to fake the deaths of the Minutemen.

==== Fulvio Carlito ====
First appearing in issue #25, Fulvio Carlito had been openly critical of the direction in which the Trust was heading. He had formed an alliance with the Kotias and Vasco families to terminate Augustus Medici. The trio induced Agent Graves to not interfere with the achievement of their goals. It was revealed that Carlito was behind a failed assassination attempt of both Augustus and Benito in Miami. Lono's first overt action as the Trust's new Warlord was to capture and torture Fulvio for information concerning the alliance (in issue #65), and to subsequently eliminate the House of Carlito upon his death.

==== Axel Nagel ====
First appearing in issue #25, an elder member of the Trust, he seemed as skeptical as Vasco about the abandonment of the Minutemen. His family apparently had disagreements with the Vascos which had to be adjudicated by the Minutemen (presumably in a brutal fashion). He was considered an ally of the House of Medici and his family was based in New York City. Axel was instrumental in approving Graves' elevation as the head of the Minutemen in 1962. This was against the wishes of the Trust's then liaison, Mr. Shore, who distrusted Graves' closeness to the Houses of Medici and Vasco. Axel Nagel died in issue #69 after willingly taking poison given by Vasco, who promised Axel to pass the House of Nagel onto his children rather than fold.

==== Lars and Anna Nagel ====
First appearing in issue #70, they were the twin heirs to the House of Nagel. Before they could decide who will lead the House of Nagel, Anna was deceived by Lono. After Lars finished an unexpected business dinner with Vasco and Vermeer, Lono told Anna that Lars was there trying to ally himself with the men who killed their father. Back at their hotel room, Lars unknowingly drank champagne that Anna spiked with lethal pills. When Lars tells his sister that he had decided that she should assume control over the House of Nagel, Anna tried to stop him from drinking his champagne. Already too late, she swallowed the rest of the pills after her brother's death, an act of suicide. The House of Nagel was absorbed by the other Houses soon after.

==== Sigmar Rhone ====
First appearing in issue #25, based in Lake Tahoe, Nevada, Sigmar was a loving husband and father as well the head of the House of Rhone. He also had covert extramarital affairs with some of the female members of the Trust. Instantly recognisable by his white beard and love of cigars, he owned a casino, record label, media outlets as well as other business interests. He received confirmation of the duplicity of Graves and other Trust leaders from Megan's bodyguard, Kate (who was another one of Sigmar's sex partners). Rhone was then forced to witness the cold blooded murder of Kate, as well as his wife and young children by Minutemen Victor Ray and Remi Rome, acting on Agent Graves' behalf. He himself was then executed.

==== Joan D'Arcy ====
First appearing in issue #25, she is the head of the Chicago-based House of D'Arcy who was alleged to be allied to the House of Medici. In the wake of the elimination of eight Trust families, Joan D'Arcy approached retired Minuteman Will Slaughter to perform hits on Abe Rothstein, a covert ops specialist who assisted Agent Graves with intelligence, briefcases and "magic bullets", as well as Javier Vasco. She has survived two attacks by Remi, and was being targeted by Victor, until Graves called him off. She participated in a sit down with the remaining houses and Graves. She was apparently suffocated by Cole Burns in issue #100. Her name is derived from Joan of Arc.

==== Constance Von Hagen ====
First appearing in issue #25, she is killed by Victor in issue #86 along with Helena Kotias. Like Helena, she had a clandestine affair with the late Sigmar Rhone. Although her House's name was not mentioned in the book, Brian Azzarello confirmed the character's family name after the series had drawn to a close.

== The Minutemen ==
Led by Agent Graves, the Minutemen are seven killing machines who policed The Trust, originally thirteen rich, corrupt, and powerful families. Mr. Shepherd, himself a former Minuteman, held the position of Warlord (liaison between the Trust and the Minutemen) and trained Lono and Wylie personally though it is unknown if he trained the rest. The Minutemen were supposed to be killed off on the Trust's orders - instead, their deaths were faked and the members hypnotically hidden in new lives by Graves and Shepherd.

The "hibernating" Minutemen lived very different lives under widely different identities, some going back to the personal lives they had before becoming Minutemen while others took on new identities and lifestyles entirely. The Minutemen could only be "reactivated" upon hearing a code-word known by Graves, chosen for its uncommonness and specificity to "the greatest crime in the history of mankind". Additionally some sort of physical/mental trauma seems to play a role in the reactivation of several Minutemen, as some characters are subjected to extreme circumstances as an apparent part of their "waking up". To what exact extent this trauma is tied to the reactivation process (assuming it has any intrinsic part, at all) is unknown, as the reader is not explicitly shown every character's specific reactivation process.

=== The Atlantic City Minutemen ===
==== Agent Philip Graves ====
The main character of much of the series, Agent Philip Graves is a mysterious and enigmatic man who presents wronged individuals with the opportunity for revenge without consequences. He is first introduced in the eight-page story in the 1998 Vertigo Winter special "Silencer Night", before appearing in 100 Bullets issue #1. Graves is a man in his mid-to-late sixties who appears like a police or government agency official.

Philip Graves was a Minuteman until he was elected to the position of Agent in the early 1960s after the death of Agent Neil Walker. His new position was contested by then-Warlord Mr. Shore, who implicated Graves in the death of Walker and as being in league with other Trust members, but Shore was overruled by Trust leaders Roland Dietrich and Axel Nagel. As Agent, Graves was the head of the Minutemen up until their apparent demise in Atlantic City. Graves himself was believed dead by the Trust until his re-emergence, shortly before the beginning of the series.

After his presumed death, Graves retained his access to the attaché cases containing evidence of a crime, a gun with 100 untraceable bullets, and immunity from law enforcement to give to whomever he pleased. Many of the people he approached were being given an opportunity to deliver justice as they saw fit. In some instances, the person was unknowingly used for the Trust's purposes. In other cases, Graves uses the attachés to test the person's morality and constitution for varying purposes (sometimes as a precedent to recruitment into the Minutemen). Graves' access to the attachés was eventually halted due to the death of his supplier, Abe Rothstein.

His true motives were unclear for much of the series, but it became apparent that Graves was looking to avenge his betrayal by taking down the Trust. It was eventually revealed that Graves, along with Augustus Medici and Javier Vasco, had masterminded a decades-long grand plan to assume power over the other houses of the Trust. After Vasco's death, Graves and Augustus agreed to sit down with the remaining members of the Trust where, as part of a peace agreement brokered by Augustus, Graves was forced to resign as Agent, only to assume rule over the vacant House of Vasco. Graves was required to select a new Agent from the remaining Minutemen: Cole, Victor, Jack, Dizzy, and Loop.

In issue #100, Graves appointed Dizzy as the new Agent and tasked her with punishing those responsible for the death of Benito. He then went to confront Augustus, blaming him for his son's death. When Graves found Augustus he chose to punish him personally, shooting the unarmed Medici in the chest. This accidentally set off an explosion which killed Megan Dietrich and Cole Burns, and appeared to seriously injure Dizzy. The series concluded with Graves cradling Dizzy's body in the middle of the burning household, as she claimed that as a Minuteman, she must kill him for killing Augustus and moving against another family of the Trust. Their ultimate fates are not shown, but Graves' mood in the series' closing moments was one of despair, as he declared his life has been ruined, and he did not resist as Dizzy took aim at his throat in a panel drawn to ape Michaelangelo's Pietà. It seemed extremely unlikely that he would survive.

Throughout the series, Graves is always shown to be meticulous and calculating, rarely showing any outbursts of emotions. In some rare instances, he is shown to very much care personally for certain characters (such as in his almost fatherly relationship with Dizzy). Although he does not appear in every issue or story arc, Graves' presence dominates most of the action and intrigue that occurs in the book.

He is possibly an atheist, as when Lono asks him if he believes in God during issue #100, Graves responds, "No".

He was described by series creator Brian Azzarello as "the only character who never lies".

The character appeared as an easter egg in the panels of Azzarello's run of Batman story "Broken City". He is based on a composite of actor Lee Marvin and writer Brian Azzarello's grandfather, a Massachusetts police officer.

==== Lono (also known as "The Dog") ====
First appearing in issue #5, Lono is a dangerous, larger-than-life beast of a man born in Hawaii in 1962, and is generally presented as the series' most irredeemable character. A Minuteman at the time of the events of Atlantic City, Lono is an ultra-violent, sadistic man prone to enjoying committing such cruelties as torture and rape in the process of pursuing his own ends. He is preternaturally strong and extremely tough, and on multiple occasions is shown to have sustained apparently deadly injuries (such as multiple shootings at close range), only to reappear in a later issue. He is suggested at times to be genuinely psychopathic or even simply insane, but is shown as the series progresses to be somewhat more intelligent and cunning than he is first given credit for.

Lono was the only Minuteman not present for the events of Atlantic City, a matter later revealed to have been engineered by Shepherd, who wanted Lono to succeed him as the Trust's Warlord in the event of his own death. Believing his comrades dead, Lono served his own interests until Graves' reappearance and subsequent activation/training of several Minutemen. Eventually, Lono was framed for robbing a bank by Shepherd at Graves' request as punishment for killing Milo Garret (whose true identity was unknown to Lono as he beat him to death - Milo was also the only Minuteman he actually cared about). While in prison, Shepherd told Lono that he was to train the already incarcerated Loop Hughes to become a Minuteman as his personal penance.

Before his death, Shepherd told Lono to formally assume his place, revealing that he had never trained Lono to remain as a Minuteman and had always intended him to become Warlord of the Trust. Lono threw himself into his new role with characteristic enthusiasm and somewhat uncharacteristic brains and guile, covertly recruiting several Minutemen as his team and seeking to recruit new ones such as his former prison protege Loop Hughes. Lono even went so far as to attempt to bring Crete, the Medici family's unfailingly loyal bodyguard, into his group of new Minutemen, though ultimately was unsuccessful.

Lono anticipated that Graves would attempt to kill Augustus Medici, and worked to position himself as a confidant to the Medicis with considerable influence over Benito. When Lono finally met Dizzy Cordova, he stated that he blamed her for killing Shepherd, which led to a brutal fight between the two. Lono captures Dizzy and offers her (bound and beaten) to Benito, oblivious of Benito and Dizzy's previous relationship and his fondness for her. Benito responds to Lono's act by shooting him in the face, but the bullet fails to kill Lono, who then fled the Medici property, sustaining multiple severe injuries in the process.

Lono contacted Loop while Loop was in the midst of a standoff with remaining Minutemen Victor, Cole and Jack, and in a rage encouraged them to kill each other if they were so inclined, since that's what Graves and the Trust had wanted them to do. In issue #100, Lono breaks back into the Medici grounds and confronts Graves before being shot several times by Dizzy and falling out of a window. The next time the window is shown, his body is absent and there is a trail of blood, leading away.

Lono's fate was revealed in the miniseries Brother Lono.

==== Milo Garret (also known as "The Bastard") ====
Milo Garret first appeared in issue #27 (and previously, in a flashback sequence in issue #10). After Atlantic City he was deactivated, and assumed the life of a hard-boiled and heavy drinking private detective in Los Angeles, reminiscent of the antihero character types popular in "pulp" stories and the classic film noir genre. His face appears fully wrapped in bandages for much of his part in the series, the result of a supposed recent car accident that left him badly disfigured.

Milo was hired on a case involving a painting owned by Megan Dietrich that was targeted by Lono and Echo Memoria for purposes unknown. Neither Lono nor Megan recognized Milo, due to some combination of the bandages that obscured his face, the long time since seeing one another and/or his frequent usage of assumed names and casual misdirection (a habit he presumably acquired in his new profession as an investigator). In the process of pursuing the case, Milo uncovers several clues associated with the series' greater conspiracy before eventually being awakened to his true nature as Minuteman and regaining his memories. However, having previously been quite open in his personal dislike and distrust of Graves, Milo was unwilling to return to the world of the Minutemen, preferring his new life and all that it involved to the prospect of returning to the group. To that end, Milo engineered his own demise, being physically beaten and then ultimately shot in the mouth by Lono; the full story of Graves' intended role for him only becoming clear to Milo in his dying seconds.

Milo was reputed to be perhaps the most ruthlessly "wicked" of the Minutemen, earning him the code name "The Bastard". Because of his personality he got on well with Lono; when Shepherd reveals to Lono that the man he killed was Milo (whom he didn't recognize due to the bandages on his face), Lono shows sincere regret.

Milo was reactivated in issue #34 after seeing the painting "La Morte dil Cesare" (and its depiction of the word "Croatoa" above a doorway) in Megan Dietrich's house.

==== Cole Burns (also known as "The Wolf") ====
First appearing in issue #9, Cole was the first Minuteman shown to be reactivated, shortly after he accepted Graves' offer to avenge his grandmother's untimely death. Prior to his reactivation, he worked as an ice cream salesman, and was running small deals for a local racketeer in New Jersey. He had a girlfriend, Sasha, but the events of his resumed life as a Minuteman apparently left anything between them finished.

Cole spends much of the early series as Graves' "right hand man" and was shown to be fiercely loyal to him even when not fully understanding Graves' plans himself. It was Cole who carried out the murder of Daniel Peres, and assisting Remi Rome in the killing of Mia Simone under Graves' orders. He was also later sent with Mr. Branch to retrieve the La Morte dil Cesar painting from Ronnie Rome, only to find Branch dead once that mission was completed.

Following the deaths of Branch (with whom Cole had become friendly) and Wylie Times (with whom Cole was, if not friendly, at least purported to mutually like and/or respect one another) he became disillusioned with Graves' plans. Cole took the painting, then met with Jack Daw and Loop Hughes, seemingly in consideration of changing sides. Lono, who refused to trust Cole after his years of loyalty to Graves, ordered Loop over the phone to terminate Cole on the spot. Loop's attempt to comply with this order is then halted by Jack. Cole and Jack led Loop to a secluded rural area, apparently to execute him. At this point Jack turned on Cole, knocking him out, and allowing Loop to escape. It is later revealed that Cole's intention was supposedly never to kill Loop and the two leave the woods together.

A short while later, Cole and Loop run into Jack at a motel, where he is found with Echo Memoria. Cole shoots Echo whilst she and Jack are engaged in sexual intercourse, killing her to avenge Mr. Branch. A standoff ensues, and after assessing their predicament, as well as their roles in the motives of their respective bosses, Cole and the remaining Minutemen (Jack, Loop and Victor) set out to the Medici estate to confront Graves and the Trust.

In issue #100, Cole covertly killed Tibo Vermeer and Joan D'Arcy, before confronting Megan Dietrich. Trapping her in a room doused with gasoline, he taunted her with his lighter. The sound of an unexpected gunshot, fired by Agent Graves in another room, caused Cole to accidentally drop the lighter, incinerating both Megan and himself. The lighter is seen to literally slip through his fingers, and given his preternatural reflexes, it is possible that he was able to recover the lighter, but like some of the other Minutemen in the finale, chose his own ending.

Cole's codename, "The Wolf", is reflected in his personal story arc in 100 Bullets. He is at first depicted as unquestioning and loyal to the assumed leader of his "pack" (Graves), but gradually becomes more independent as another leader (Wylie) dies and Cole finds himself with a greater degree of power. Eventually he seizes a powerful token (the much-sought-after "La Morte dil Cesar") for his own purposes, and ends the series as a Minuteman gone rogue, killing off Megan Dietrich's would-be alliance with the remaining Trust powers and looking every bit the predator circling his final kill before his death.

Cole was reactivated in issue #9 when a junkie, paid by Graves, whispered the word "Croatoa" to him. He was fully "awakened" after his ice cream truck exploded and he was caught by the blast.

==== Wylie Times (also known as "The Point Man") ====
Wylie Times first appeared in issue #28 (and previously, in Cole's flashback sequence in issue #10). A seemingly unimportant gas station attendant and part-time smuggler in El Paso, Texas, Wylie was revealed to have once been thought of as the most intelligent and focused of the Minutemen, as well as by far the best marksman and the deadliest of all the group with a gun. Before his deactivation, he was widely considered the most skilled of the group and served as their field leader. He attracted the attention of Dizzy Cordova after an unsuccessful attempt by Shepherd to reactivate him. Some time after that, Graves offered to Wylie an attaché whose contents implicated Shepherd in the murder of Rose Madrid, his deceased lover and a member of a family of the Trust.

After being reactivated by Graves in New Orleans, Wylie briefly flared with purpose in order to confront his demons, finally making peace with Shepherd (and his own part in Rose Madrid's death) shortly before Shepherd was slain. Soon however, Wylie reverted to his directionless ways, tagging along behind Dizzy through the Mexican desert. Wylie told Graves off when he requested Wylie bring Dizzy into the fold, and was forced to kill his old partner Coochie and his men when they confronted Wylie and Dizzy upon Graves' orders.

After encountering Victor Ray, Wylie decided to meet with Graves and exchanged words with Cole and Remi, suggesting he had figured out Graves' plan after mentioning that Graves was possibly attempting an atonement for a dark deed in his past. Tragically, Remi mistook Wylie's reaching for matches in his pocket as him drawing a gun and shot his former leader through the chest (although Victor later suspected other possible motivations for the shooting). Graves rushed to Wylie in shock and horror, but was too late to save him. As Wylie died, he had a vision of Rose coming to greet him in the afterlife.

Wylie was set apart from the other Minutemen by his skills and leadership. In the course of the series, Wylie is revealed to be the group's commander after Graves. These traits, along with his marksmanship, are likely the reason for his being codenamed "The Point Man". Wylie is one of the more redemptive characters in the series, having shown a greater capacity for empathy and caring for other people than several of his fellow Minutemen. He became especially close with Dizzy Cordova, and their relationship carried several parallels to Wylie's with tragically lost love, Rose Madrid.

Wylie was reactivated in issue #53 by a musician citing the title of a song he had written, "Blue Day for Croatoa". The title was suggested to the musician by Graves.

==== Victor Ray (also known as "The Rain") ====
Victor Ray first appeared in issue #50 (and previously, obscured in Cole's flashback sequence in issue #10), where he recounted the story of Roanoke and the origins of the Trust. Graves activated Victor while on his way to meet Dizzy in Chicago for the first time, although this fact is only revealed much later on in the series. For an extended period of time, Victor remained unaffiliated with the rest of the Minutemen as they became reactivated, for reasons known only to him and Graves.

Recruited by Lono and Loop shortly after they were released from prison, he carried out the apparent assassination attempt on Megan Dietrich in San Diego and escaped unnoticed. It was later revealed in issue #79 that Lono engineered the purposely botched assassination attempt to solidify power amongst members of the Trust. During this time, Victor also served as a mentoring partner of Loop in the ways of the Minutemen. Eventually, Victor deserted Lono's group in the Mexican desert in favor of Graves, apprehending Branch and Dizzy and leaving an unconscious Benito for his former comrades.

Victor (along with Remi) struck again in issue #84, gunning down the wife, children, and associates of the House of Rhone before killing family head Sigmar Rhone himself. He also assassinated Helena Kotias and Constance Von Hagen. Later when Remi was horribly injured, Victor visited him in the hospital, and was the only witness to Remi's suicide. A short while later, Victor was also seen in Omaha, targeting a gun at the household where Tibo Vermeer, Megan Dietrich and Joan D'Arcy were meeting, but the attack was called off by Graves at the last minute due to Vasco's death. He was then made aware of Loop, Cole and Jack's whereabouts and confronted them in an armed standoff at Jack's motel. His loyalty to Graves shaken by Cole's defection, Victor teamed up with the remaining Minutemen to confront Graves.

Victor leaves the series with Loop and his own father, Will Slaughter, driving away from the burning house of Medici as the series' climactic events unfold.

Victor consistently shows complete control over his emotions and utter dedication to his work. He is notable among the Minutemen for his apparently high intelligence and tremendous precision in executing his missions. Victor is also a highly accurate shot, able to shoot Megan Dietrich just above the heart, as ordered. While Victor appeared the most unquestioningly loyal to Graves of anyone through most of the series, he ultimately chose to side with his intuition rather than follow Graves to his possible/probable death in issue #100.

Victor was reactivated immediately prior to the events depicted in issue #1. Agent Graves whispered the word into Victor's ear moments before he first approached Dizzy.

==== Jack Daw (also known as "The Monster") ====
Jack Daw first appeared in issue #21 (and previously, obscured in Cole's flashback sequence in issue #10). Jack's life was ruled by a heroin addiction while he worked occasional odd jobs as a bouncer in Boston. He was given an attaché by Graves that was (apparently) the only one containing a picture of its recipient, essentially prompting him to commit suicide. After receiving the attaché, Jack instead carried on with his life of addiction and crime.

Jack and his friend Mikey later made their way toward Atlantic City, where they ran across a business run by Mikey's cousin: a zoo full of wild animals that, for a fee, could be "hunted" by mafiosi for thrills. When a caged tiger brought back vague memories of his previous life, it is revealed that Jack was a Minuteman at the time of the events of Atlantic City, and that after being deactivated, he had merely descended into a pattern of substance abuse fueled by depressive self-loathing that had been established much earlier in his life.

After the personal revelation, Jack parted ways with Mikey, kicked his heroin habit once and for all, and took up bareknuckle street boxing in Atlantic City. Graves, openly scornful of the waste that Jack has made of his life, seemed reluctant to reactivate him before he could fully overcome his erratic and dangerous tendencies. Lono then fully reactivated Jack, though whether this was under direct instruction from Shepherd, Graves, or by his own inclination is unknown.

After working for Lono for a while and traveling with Loop and Victor Ray, Jack bolted on his own after receiving the La Morte dil Cesar painting from Cole. He was later found with Echo Memoria by Loop and Cole. Jack then joined the surviving Minutemen as they went to confront Graves in the series' finale. In issue #100, Jack was confronted by Crete, who attempted to stop him from entering the Medici household. The two fought and ultimately tumbled into the alligator pit during their struggle, where it is strongly suggested that both were eaten, but given the nature of the story and Jack's massive strength, his survival is not out of the question, leaving his future unknown.

Jack is physically the largest of all the Minutemen which makes him able to inflict and sustain large amounts of pain. Lono himself stated that Jack was the one most capable of taking out any of the other Minutemen due to his massive size and skills as a fighter. This, paired with the ongoing struggle with his crippling heroin addiction, is the most likely inspiration for his nickname: "The Monster".

Before the series' final issue, Jack reveals that he's developed a distaste for killing after having lived the life of a Minuteman. He nevertheless seemingly dies in the finale while engaged in hand-to-hand combat with the equally imposing Crete. This lends credence to Graves' suggestion that he is his own worst enemy, as Jack remains married to his self-destructive tendencies to the end.

Jack was reactivated in issue #68/69, whilst facing Lono in an underground boxing match. Lono arrived for the fight with the word Croatoa freshly tattooed across his stomach, revealing it to Jack when he removed his shirt for the fight.

==== Remi Rome (also known as "The Saint") ====
Remi Rome first appeared in issue #70 (and previously in Cole's flashback sequence in issue #10). The seventh Minuteman was concealed by Graves himself, following the Atlantic City incident. Remi's life after being deactivated consisted of working as a meat packer and living at home with his mother and brother in Cleveland. Following his reawakening and an assault on some meat thieves, Remi rejoined Graves' fold. In his capacities as a Minuteman, Remi is shown to be remarkably sadistic, displaying cruel tendencies at times on the level of Lono, as when he volunteered to kill Mia Simone, and when he executed the family (including young children) of Sigmar Rhone with Victor Ray.

There seemed to be some bitterness between Remi and Cole as they both went out of their way at times to insult one another. In Mexico, Remi was responsible for murdering Wylie Times when he ostensibly mistook Wylie's reaching for matches to be the drawing of a gun. The subsequent elimination of the Rhone faction culminated in the murder of Rhone's family and mistress (both of which Sigmar Rhone was forced to watch, helplessly, until his own elimination occurred).

Remi lost both of his hands in an explosion during his second botched attempt to terminate Joan D'Arcy. Because of this career-ending injury and possibly due to some lingering guilt over Wylie's death, he jumped from the roof of the hospital he was admitted to, an act of suicide. Meanwhile, his brother Ronnie was being carted into the same hospital from an ambulance after an automobile accident. Prior to his suicide, Remi told Victor the incoming (and unknown to him as his brother) victim of the accident would be helpless for the rest of his life, but the hospital would still save him. Betting he'd never miss a target and assuming his mother (who had suffered a false heart attack days before his hospitalization) is dead, he says he'll see her soon and jumps as Ronnie opened his eyes just in time to see Remi descend. Although his impact is not actually shown, Victor looks with surprise and utters a one syllable laugh.

Remi's couldn't-care-less attitude seems to have annoyed many people. His own brother, Ronnie, claimed to have hated him (even as he loved him), and Graves confronted Remi violently about his behaviors on at least one occasion. His immature behavior might be attributed to the fact that Remi was relatively young as a member of the Minutemen, likely the youngest member at the time of the group's dissolution in Atlantic City. His tendency not to over-think orders and ruthlessness in executing missions made him Graves' workhorse, and a natural partner for the disciplined and experienced Victor Ray.

Remi was reactivated in issue #73 after Agent Graves paid a homeless person to write "Croatoa" in the snow on Remi's car.

=== New Minutemen ===
==== Isabelle "Dizzy" Cordova (also known as "The Girl") ====
Isabelle Cordova first appeared in issue #1. The first person to be visibly approached by Graves, Dizzy was an ex-gangbanger who accepted his offer to avenge the deaths of her husband and child at the hands of crooked cops after her release from prison. She was subsequently recruited by Shepherd on behalf of Graves and sent to Paris, ostensibly to be briefed by a reticent Mr. Branch on the nature of her employers.

Dizzy was undergoing training by Shepherd to replace Milo as a Minuteman (perhaps the first female one), and was contested for control between Shepherd and Graves. When she refused to go with Graves, her apparently accidental activation by Wylie led to Shepherd's death at her hands. Grief-stricken, she sought solace in the desert surrounding Juárez with thoughts of revenge against Graves until she was soon confronted by the attentions of three men: Wylie, Branch and Benito Medici. Graves later explains that if it was he who activated Dizzy, Shepherd would still be alive.

Following Wylie's death, Dizzy was taken to Graves by Victor Ray, and agreed to become a Minuteman. From that time forward, she accompanied Graves until finally running into Lono at the meeting of Graves, Augustus Medici and Javier Vasco. Lono (who blamed her for Shepherd's death) attacked Dizzy, and after a fight subdued and delivered her personally to Benito. When Benito saw Dizzy beaten and bound, he shot Lono, and took Dizzy inside to tend to her injuries.

In issue #100, Dizzy was named the new Agent of the Trust by Graves, and was tasked with punishing whoever killed Benito. She confronted Megan, but was interrupted by Cole, who had prepared to deal with Megan himself. After Dizzy left Megan to Cole, the pools of gasoline in the room were accidentally(?) ignited by Cole's dropped lighter, and the resulting explosion seriously injured Dizzy. She was thrown from the balcony and fell onto a vase which shattered, possibly injuring her spine. Graves found her lying on the ground in the burning house, and told her that he had killed Augustus Medici. In the final scene of the series, Graves cradles Dizzy's body in the burning house, and she pressed a gun to his head. As an Agent, she says that she must punish him for taking action against another house. Their ultimate fates are not shown, but since Dizzy is unable to walk out of the burning, isolated house, her survival appears unlikely.

==== Louis "Loop" Hughes (also known as "The Boy") ====
First appearing in issue #15, Loop was a relatively well adjusted teenager living in Philadelphia, foregoing the gangster life-style of his peers. Despite his being the target in Graves' attache, Loop decided instead to reconcile his differences with his estranged father. After their reunion, Loop was tutored by Curtis for a short while before Curtis' death.

Soon after, he was implicated in a murder and sent to prison, an outcome intended by Graves, after Loop declined an offer to work for him. While imprisoned, he was trained to become a Minuteman under Lono, at Mr. Shepherd's request. The two were released following Shepherd's death, and Loop followed Lono in pursuing Sheperd's unfinished agenda.

Loop's first assignment as a Minuteman was to act as spotter for Victor Ray in the failed assassination attempt on Megan Dietrich. With Lono promoted to Warlord of the Trust, Loop found a new mentor in Victor. He was ordered to kill Cole by Lono but was stopped by Jack. After several more attempts by Lono to break the remaining Minutemen apart, Loop eventually joined Victor, Cole and Jack to confront Graves and the Trust.

In issue #100, Loop kills several body guards in the climactic events at the Medici residence before finally deciding that he did not want to be a Minuteman and, just as he intended to do after his father's death, Loop walks away. During the series' climactic events, he was shown driving away from the burning house of Medici with Victor Ray and Will Slaughter, having decided not to go down the violent path of a Minuteman.

=== Former Minutemen ===
==== Mr. Shepherd ====
Mr. Shepherd first appeared in issue #2. An equally mysterious associate of Graves, Joseph Shepherd was a former Minuteman who became their trainer and liaison with the Trust when he was appointed as its Warlord. He was ordered by the Trust to eliminate the Minutemen, but instead worked with Graves to conceal six of the seven that were present at Atlantic City. His true loyalties remained unknown as he maintained his own agenda somewhere between that of Graves' and the Trust's. Vying with Graves for control of Dizzy Cordova, Shepherd was mortally wounded when Wylie activated her, but he managed to appoint Lono as his successor and entrust him with Loop's training before succumbing to death in the desert somewhere near Juarez. He also cited Dizzy specifically as the replacement for Milo Garret, which suggests that Milo's death may have been manipulated more intentionally than previously thought.

In the "Tarantula" story arc, Mr. Shepherd's origin story revealed him to be a New York park basketball player who had served in Vietnam before being dishonorably discharged (it is implied for reasons to be related to his homosexuality). Agent Graves recruited Shepherd for the Minutemen after he was unable to prove Shepherd murdered a young man whom the story intimates had beaten another man into a coma. Graves was impressed by Shepherd after his own inability to prove the young man's guilt, as Shepherd seemed totally unrattled by any intimidation. Graves' decision to recruit Shepherd despite his homosexuality proved to be the last straw for Loop's father Curtis Hughes, who was excluded from the Minutemen because of his race, but had remained in service to Graves in the apparent hope that an exception would eventually be made if he proved himself capable and loyal.

==== Will Slaughter ====
Will Slaughter first appeared in issue #87. A retired Minuteman, Slaughter has been working as a contract killer in order to support his young wife and three girls. According to himself, his replacement as a Minuteman was someone he raised himself (a son or otherwise). He has recently been brought back into the activities of the Trust by Joan D'Arcy, following the elimination of three Trust heads within one week. He killed Mr. Rothstein on D'Arcy's orders, and later assassinated Vasco. He was next seen sneaking into Lono's room, and appeared ready to kill him, but Slaughter quietly walked away when he overheard Lono's phone conversation with the remaining Minutemen. Slaughter was revealed to be the father of Victor Ray in issue #100, and is seen leaving the Medici estate with Victor and Loop Hughes during the climactic melee.

==== Mr. Shore ====
Shore was the Trust's Warlord during the Fifties and Sixties, when the late Neil Walker was the Minutemen's Agent. Shore was described by Graves as a "Company Man", disliked by Graves and the likes of Vasco and Medici for his apparent loyalty to the traditional powers who led the Trust. Shore opposed Graves' elevation to the position of Agent in 1962, believing that Graves had allegiances with the young family heads, and a separate agenda of his own which would taint the Minutemen. Shore is no longer active, and probably dead, but this is not confirmed.

== Supporting characters ==
=== Mr. Branch ===
First appearing in issue #12, Branch was a journalist who was offered the attaché by Graves. He chose to investigate the origins of Graves' power and uncovered the existence of the Trust along the way. This earned him a traumatic visit from Lono, as well as an encounter with Shepherd, who revealed to him the deeper history of the Trust and the Minutemen.

Branch fled to Paris, and continued to research his obsession at great personal risk. He was briefly scared off the case by Cole Burns during Dizzy Cordova's visit to Paris, but developed an infatuation for her, which led him to accept a dangerous request by Megan Dietrich to return to the States. Diverted from meeting with Megan, he was compelled by Cole to track down Echo Memoria in Europe, but reneged on the deal in order to chase after Dizzy. He found Dizzy in Mexico along with Wylie Times and Benito Medici. The quartet lived together until Victor captured Dizzy and Branch and brought them back to the States (with Branch losing a finger in the process).

Cole then met Branch once more, and tasked him with the recovering the stolen La Morte dil Cesar painting from Ronnie Rome. Branch met his end in Atlantic City in issue #88, at the hands of Echo Memoria. Cole would later kill Echo to avenge Branch, with whom he had established an unlikely friendship.

=== Curtis Hughes ===
First appearing in issue #15, Curtis was the father of Loop Hughes. He left his family when Loop was very young, and eventually took up working as a collections man for small-time mobster Rego in Philadelphia. Curtis was a past acquaintance and operative of Graves, and he enjoyed at least token respect from most of the Minutemen. It is revealed that Curtis was once selected by Graves to become a Minuteman himself, but the Trust blocked his appointment because of his race, and as a consequence his role was restricted to assisting Graves in the recruitment and training of other Minutemen (including Mr. Shepherd). His disillusionment with the Trust based on their racism led to him eventually leaving Graves' service.

After Graves' gave Loop an attaché containing his father's picture, Curtis became reacquainted with his son, whom he mentored for a brief period of time. Curtis then refused Graves' offers of both an attaché of his own, and another chance to become a Minuteman in his advanced age.

Covering for his son Loop over some stolen money owed to Rego, Curtis was finally killed by Rego's henchmen in an arson attack.

=== Echo Memoria ===
Echo Memoria first appeared in issue #26. An art thief of Italian origin, Echo was first seen in Paris, touting herself as a prostitute to Branch in order to extract information about the Trust from him. She was next seen with Milo Garret as part of a scheme to steal the La Morte dil Cesar painting. She disappeared with Lono and the painting after Garret's death, but soon left him as well. She was immediately arrested at the airport as she attempted to flee the country by purchasing a plane ticket with some of the stolen money used by Shepherd to set Lono up.

Some time later, Echo was apparently released from custody and, according to Cole Burns, returned to Europe. Later, Graves sent Ronnie Rome to Europe to retrieve the La Morte dil Cesar painting from her. Echo was next seen in Atlantic City in issue #88 talking to Mr. Branch, and he is later found dead at the same spot where they met. Eventually, Echo then met up with Jack, who was in possession of the La Morte dil Cesar painting, before she was killed by Cole Burns in retaliation for the murder of his friend Branch.

In the end, her body was wrapped in the painting she had so long sought, and both were dumped into a swamp. The entire significance of the painting to Echo is never fully made clear.

=== Ronnie Rome ===
Ronnie Rome first appeared in issue #70. The brother of Remi Rome, Ronnie was an enforcer for small-time mobster Mimo Pallidino in Cleveland. Ronnie was given an attaché from Agent Graves, with Remi as his target. Remi found the attaché before it could be used, and confronted Ronnie about it, but the gun was not actually fired until the pair find themselves in a shootout with meat thieves (a battle that left Ronnie crippled).

Following the assault, Remi disappeared (to resume his life as an activated Minuteman) and Ronnie was eventually visited by Agent Graves. Graves made use of Ronnie, sending him to Italy to recover the La Morte dil Cesar painting from Echo Memoria. Ronnie delivered the painting to Cole Burns, who came close to shooting Ronnie in revenge for Remi killing Wylie.

After finding out about Remi's accident, Ronnie was on his way to visit his brother in the hospital when his taxi was overturned in a road rage-related accident. Ronnie was last seen on a stretcher outside of the hospital where Remi committed suicide by jumping off the roof of the hospital. It is unclear if Remi fell on his brother or not, but it is made clear that Ronnie did witness his brother's fall.

=== Crete ===
First appearing in issue #23, Crete is the massive, quiet bodyguard of Augustus Medici. Crete is shown to possess great skills at his job, has tremendous physical strength, is an excellent fighter and tracker, and despite his size is preternaturally quick. He declined Lono's attempt to recruit him as a soldier when he was made Warlord of the Trust, preferring instead to continue to provide his services to the House of Medici. Crete seems to be incredibly loyal to the Medici family and will stop at nothing to protect them. He openly detests Lono and repeatedly states that he will kill him if he does anything to harm the Medicis. It is revealed that Crete was once recruited to join the Minutemen (presumably by Graves), but he chose to become the Medici's bodyguard instead.

In issue #100, Crete stands in the way of Jack Daw from entering the Medici household, fighting him until they fall into the alligator pit, where they are both apparently eaten.

=== Abe Rothstein ===
A very well-connected arms dealer with substantial ties to local organized law enforcement, FBI, CIA and "higher", he was an ally of Graves, and is the apparent source of all of Graves' attaches, guns, untraceable bullets and legal immunity. He was tortured and killed by Will Slaughter in issue #91 at Joan D'Arcy's request, thus ending Graves' "game".
