= 100 Bullets =

American comic book series

- Cover to 100 Bullets vol. 1 "First Shot, Last Call", cover art by Dave Johnson.

Publication information
- Publisher: Vertigo
- Schedule: Monthly
- Genre: Crime
- Publication date: June 1999 – April 2009
- No. of issues: 100
- Main characters: Agent Graves; Mr. Shepherd; The Minutemen; Dizzy Cordova; Loop Hughes

Creative team
- Created by: Brian Azzarello; Eduardo Risso
- Written by: Brian Azzarello
- Artist(s): Eduardo Risso; Dave Johnson
- Letterer: Clem Robins
- Colorist(s): Grant Goleash; Patricia Mulvihill

Collected editions
- First Shot, Last Call: ISBN 1-56389-645-1
- Split Second Chance: ISBN 1-56389-711-3

100 Bullets is an American comic book published by DC Comics under its Vertigo imprint. Written by Brian Azzarello and illustrated by Eduardo Risso, the comic book ran for 100 issues over ten years (1999 to 2009) and won the Eisner Award and Harvey Award. A sequel, 100 Bullets: Brother Lono was released in 2014, and a further entry in the series, 100 Bullets: The US of Anger, was announced in 2025.

== Style ==
Both the writing and artwork in 100 Bullets exemplifies the noir and pulp genres of popular modern fiction. Consistent with noir convention, most of the characters are deeply flawed. As is also common in pulp and noir genres, 100 Bullets frequently portrays stylized and graphic violence.

Initially presented as a series of self-contained episodic stories, 100 Bullets developed into a sprawling crime saga in which all the characters and events were connected.

== Plot ==
The core concept of 100 Bullets is based on the question of people willing to act on the desire of violent revenge if given the means, opportunity, and a reasonable chance to succeed. Many of the early issues involve the mysterious Agent Graves approaching someone who has been a victim of a terrible wrong. Graves gives them the opportunity to take revenge by providing a handgun, 100 bullets, and documentation about the primary target responsible for their woes. He informs the candidate the gun and bullets are completely untraceable by any law enforcement investigation, and as soon as they are found at any crime scene, investigations will immediately cease.

Although all the revenge murders enabled by Agent Graves are presented as justifiable, the candidates are neither rewarded nor punished for accepting the offer other than their own personal satisfaction. Several people decline, but others who accept find varied success or failure. The attaché and Graves' "games" are later revealed to be only a minor part of a much broader story.

Agent Graves is the leader of a group known as The Minutemen, a group of seven men (plus one "Agent") who serve as the enforcers and police of a clandestine organization known as The Trust, which was formed by the heads of 13 powerful European families who controlled much of the Old World's combined wealth and industry. The Trust made an offer to the kings of Europe by which they would leave the continent and their considerable influence and holdings, in exchange for complete autonomy in the still unclaimed portion of the New World. When England ignored this proposition and colonized the Roanoke Island late in the 16th century, the Minutemen were formed. The original Minutemen, seven vicious killers, eradicated the colony and all of its inhabitants, leaving behind only the cryptic message "Croatoa" as a warning, reclaiming the land for the Trust. Since this time, the Minutemen's charge has been to protect the 13 Houses of the Trust, serving as their force against outside threats and more frequently as police of the internal conflicts between the Trust families themselves. The groups' interactions are often facilitated by a person holding the title "Warlord" for the Trust, who serves as the Houses' liaison to the Minutemen.

Sometime in the late 20th century, the Minutemen were betrayed by the Trust and disbanded after Agent Graves refused to reenact "The Greatest Crime in the History of Mankind" (a re-expansion of the borders of the Trust). The Minutemen retaliated with the assassination of a hooded figure in Atlantic City, and they were then sent into hiding. Most of the Minutemen of that time were "deactivated" by Graves. These former Minutemen had their memories repressed for their own protection and were returned to "normal" lives. These events occurred prior (presumably some years) to the beginning of 100 Bullets.

As the story plays out, many of those who are offered the chance for vengeance by Graves are revealed to have been people wronged by the Trust or its agents, and six are revealed to have been Minutemen at the time of the events of Atlantic City. During the course of the series, Agent Graves seeks to reactivate several of his Minutemen and recruit potential new members. With the occasional aid of the Trust's current Warlord, Mr. Shepherd, Graves sets into motion a plot of revenge against the Trust, which divides into factions, with younger members plotting against the older ones. The series culminates in the downfall of the Trust and its agents.

== Story arcs ==
=== Collected editions ===
There are thirteen trade paperbacks in publication for this series. The titles of the trade paperbacks relate to their volume number (First Shot, Last Call; Split Second Chance; A Foregone Tomorrow; The Counterfifth Detective; Six Feet Under the Gun; Strychnine Lives; Decayed (a pun on "decade"; this is the tenth volume)), with four being indirect references (book 7 titled Samurai, for Seven Samurai; book 8 titled The Hard Way, a reference to a roll in craps; book 12 titled Dirty, as in The Dirty Dozen; book 13 titled Wilt, for basketball player Wilt Chamberlain, who wore the number 13 and was famous for scoring 100 points in a single game). Book 11 Once Upon a Crime is also a reference as "once" is Spanish for eleven. The exception to the rule is book 3, which was originally to be called The Charm — as in "third time's the charm" — but was given the title of the collection's largest plot arc, Hang Up on the Hang Low, when it won the Eisner Award. Another interpretation of this seemingly odd exception is that 'Hang Up on the Hang Low' is a coded allusion to Masonic symbology, the upwards triangle placed over the downward triangle, where the number 3 is alluded to, among other things, by this code. As The Trust can also be seen to be a Masonic type allusion, one should also look for other Masonic symbols throughout the books. A series of "Deluxe Edition" hardcover volumes collecting the series have also been published, and then released in paperback a few years later.

#	Title	Publisher	Year	ISBN	Reprints
1	First Shot, Last Call	Vertigo	2013	ISBN 1563896451	Vertigo: Winter's Edge #3; 100 Bullets #1-5
2	Split Second Chance	Vertigo	2014	ISBN 1563897113	100 Bullets #6-14
3	Hang up on the Hang Low	Vertigo	2014	ISBN 1563898551	100 Bullets #15-19
4	A Foregone Tomorrow	Vertigo	2014	ISBN 1563898276	100 Bullets #20-30
5	The Counterfifth Detective	Vertigo	2014	ISBN 1563899485	100 Bullets #31-36
6	Six Feet Under The Gun	Vertigo	2014	ISBN 1563899965	100 Bullets #37-42
7	Samurai	Vertigo	2014	ISBN 140120189X	100 Bullets #43-49
8	The Hard Way	Vertigo	2014	ISBN 1401204902	100 Bullets #50-58
9	Strychnine Lives	Vertigo	2014	ISBN 1401209289	100 Bullets #59-67
10	Decayed	Vertigo	2014	ISBN 140120998X	100 Bullets #68-75
11	Once Upon a Crime	Vertigo	2014	ISBN 1401213154	100 Bullets #76-83
12	Dirty	Vertigo	2014	ISBN 140121939X	100 Bullets #84-88
13	Wilt	Vertigo	2014	ISBN 1401222870	100 Bullets #89-100

Note: The full title of all volumes listed here start with "100 Bullets: ".

=== 100 Bullets Deluxe Edition ===
#	Title	ISBN	Release date	Pages	Collected material
1	100 Bullets - Book I	ISBN 1-4012-3201-9 (HC) ISBN 1-4012-5056-4 (TPB)	October 11, 2011 (HC) November 4, 2014 (TPB)	456	Vertigo: Winter's Edge #3, 100 Bullets #1–19
2	100 Bullets - Book II	ISBN 1-4012-3372-4 (HC) ISBN 1-4012-5431-4 (TPB)	April 17, 2012 (HC) April 21, 2015 (TPB)	416	100 Bullets #20-36
3	100 Bullets - Book III	ISBN 1-4012-3729-0 (HC) ISBN 1-4012-5795-X (TPB)	September 25, 2012 (HC) September 22, 2015 (TPB)	528	100 Bullets #37-58
4	100 Bullets - Book IV	ISBN 1-4012-3807-6 (HC) ISBN 1-4012-5794-1	April 23, 2013 (HC) January 12, 2016 (TPB)	512	100 Bullets #59-80
5	100 Bullets - Book V	ISBN 1-4012-4271-5 (HC) ISBN 1-4012-6133-7 (TPB)	December 3, 2013 (HC) April 5, 2016 (TPB)	512	100 Bullets #81-100

=== 100 Bullets Omnibus ===
The series has been collected in two Omnibus hardcover editions. Although the second volume was initially solicited to include the follow-up Brother Lono miniseries in addition to the main series, ultimately only the original hundred issues were collected (plus an early short story).

#	Title	ISBN	Release date	Pages	Collected material
1	100 Bullets Omnibus Vol. 1	ISBN 1-77950-742-9 (HC)	January 12, 2021	1376	Vertigo: Winter's Edge #3, 100 Bullets #1–58
2	100 Bullets Omnibus Vol. 2	ISBN 1-77951-486-7 (HC)	June 28, 2022	1008	100 Bullets #59-100

== Media adaptations ==
Acclaim announced plans to release a video game based on 100 Bullets, but following the collapse of Acclaim's publishing house, the game was cancelled. It was intended that the player would be either Cole Burns or Snow Falls (a completely original character) and play in a third person view, with actor Keanu Reeves portraying Cole Burns. The plot was not publicly known, aside from a supposition that it followed the plot of the comic book.

D3 Publisher of America obtained the rights from Warner Bros. to publish a 100 Bullets video game in 2006. They intended to make a video game completely independent from Acclaim's aborted vision, albeit still heavily reliant on input and plotting from Brian Azzarello and releasing it in Q3 2007, but was never released.

In 2011, screenwriter David S. Goyer was attached to executive produce and write a TV series based on the comics for Showtime. Two years later, Goyer said that the project got "incredibly close" at Showtime before being turned down due to a multitude of mass shootings across the United States. He called the sudden turn of events "frustrating", further stating: "At one point, I thought it was going to happen at Showtime. It got to the three-yard line".

In 2014, SciFiNow reported The Wall Street Journal's release of information regarding upcoming Warner Brothers films based on DC Comics properties. The films that were revealed to be in development included the much anticipated Justice League film; Shazam!, Fables, and 100 Bullets were among the other films listed. A film adaptation was announced in August 2015, and was to be produced by Tom Hardy with the option for him to star in the film, written by Chris Borrelli and distributed by New Line Cinema.

== Critical reception ==
The series has attracted critical acclaim from within and beyond the American comics industry, as "very violent, dark and clever" and "a series of compelling morality tales". In his introduction for the second volume collection, Howard Chaykin wrote, "Thanks are overdue to both these guys for producing the most exciting comic book in years".

=== Awards ===
The series won the 2002 Harvey Awards for Best Writer, Best Artist and Best Continuing Series, and the 2003 Harvey Award for Best Artist. It also won the 2001 Eisner Award for Best Serialized Story, and the 2002 and 2004 Eisner Award for Best Continuing Series.

== Sequels ==
=== 100 Bullets: Brother Lono ===
The franchise's creative team behind the original 100 Bullets joined forces once again to work on a limited series sequel, Brother Lono, released in April 2014. It was an 8-issue limited series that detailed Lono's rehabilitated life in Durango after the events of 100 Bullets issue #100.

The Brother Lono Deluxe Edition hardcover was released in 2024. It contains Lono is a Four Letter Word, an exclusive 8-page comic. It also has Dave Johnson artwork covers to match the five-volume hardcover 100 Bullets Deluxe Edition.

=== 100 Bullets: The US of Anger ===
In 2025, DC officially unveiled their first line of titles for the Vertigo revival, including 100 Bullets: The US of Anger with Azzarello and Risso returning. The first issue of the eight-issue mini-series was released in July, 2026.

=== Collected editions ===
Title	Format	ISBN	Release date	Pages	Collected material
100 Bullets: Brother Lono	Softcover	ISBN 978-1-4012-4506-1	April 15, 2014	192	100 Bullets: Brother Lono #1-8
100 Bullets: Brother Lono Deluxe Edition	Hardcover	ISBN 978-1-7795-2743-1	August 13, 2024	216	100 Bullets: Brother Lono #1-8 Lono is a Four Letter Word (8-page comic)

== See also ==
Other titles by the same creative team:

- Jonny Double
- Batman: Broken City
- Flashpoint: Knight of Vengeance
- Spaceman
- Moonshine
