= Batton Lash =

American comics creator (1953–2019)

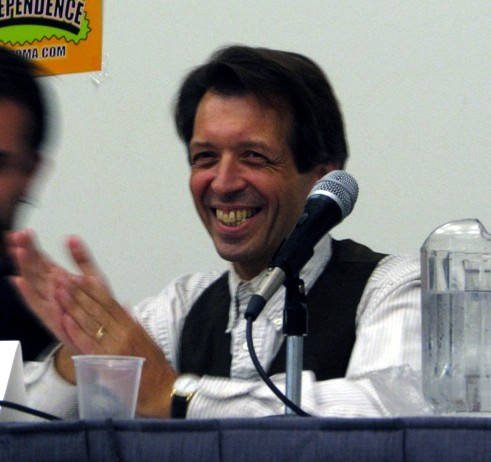
- Lash in 2007
- Born: Vito Marangi; October 29, 1953 Brooklyn, New York, U.S.
- Died: January 12, 2019 (aged 65) San Diego, California, U.S.
- Area: Cartoonist

Batton Lash (born Vito Marangi, October 29, 1953 – January 12, 2019)was an American comics creator who came to prominence as part of the 1990s self-publishing boom. He is best known for the series Wolff and Byrd, Counselors of the Macabre (a.k.a. Supernatural Law), a comedic series about law partners specializing in cases dealing with archetypes from the horror genre, which ran as a strip in The National Law Journal, and as a stand-alone series of comic books and graphic novels. He received several awards for his work, including an Inkpot Award, an Independent Book Publishers Association's Benjamin Franklin Award, an Eisner Award, and nominations for two Harvey Awards.

== Career ==
Batton Lash was born in Brooklyn, New York, and studied cartooning and graphic arts at Manhattan's School of Visual Arts.

In 1979, he began writing and drawing Wolff and Byrd, Counselors of the Macabre, as a weekly newspaper strip which appeared in The Brooklyn Paper until 1996 and The National Law Journal from 1983 to 1997. In 1980 Lash was a courtroom sketch artist during the trial against John Gotti. In 1994, he and his wife Jackie Estrada founded Exhibit A Press to publish the series as a full-length comic book stories, renaming it Supernatural Law. It was later made available as a digital download on the Comics+ and Graphicly apps.

In 1994 he wrote Archie Meets the Punisher, a well-received crossover between the teen characters of Archie Comics and Marvel Comics' grim antihero the Punisher. He wrote eight issues of Radioactive Man for Bongo Comics, which received an Eisner Award for Best Humor Publication in 2002.

In 2009 he began working with writer James Hudnall on "Obama Nation", a conservative political comic strip on Andrew Breitbart's website BigGovernment. The series drew national attention in 2011, when MSNBC commentator Lawrence O'Donnell criticized one of the strips as racist, accusing it of caricaturing Barack and Michelle Obama using stereotypes of African Americans.

== Death ==
He died at his home on January 12, 2019, from brain cancer at the age of 65.

== Awards and nominations ==
- 1996: Don Thompson Award – Best Achievement by a Cartoonist (tie)
- 1997: Don Thompson Award – Best Achievement by a Writer & Artist
- 2002: Radioactive Man – Eisner Award for Best Humor Publication
- 2003: Mister Negativity and Other Tales of Supernatural Law – nominated for Harvey Special Award for Humor
- 2003: Supernatural Law #35 – nominated for Harvey Award for Best Single Issue
- 2004: Inkpot Award
- 2009: The Soddyssey, And Other Tales of Supernatural Law – Independent Book Publishers Association's Benjamin Franklin Award for Graphic Novel

== Bibliography ==
=== Comics ===
- Wolff and Byrd, Counselors of the Macabre #1–23
- Mavis #1–3 (featuring Wolff and Byrd's secretary)
- Supernatural Law #24–45
- Radioactive Man volume 2 (eight issues)
- Simpsons Super Spectacular #1–5
- Archie Meets the Punisher, one-shot
- Archie Comics "The House of Riverdale"
- Archie Comics "Archie Freshman Year"
- The Big Book of Death (contributor)
- The Big Book of Weirdos (contributor)
- The Big Book of Urban Legends (contributor)
- The Big Book of Thugs (contributor)

=== Collections ===
- Wolff & Byrd, Counselors of the Macabre—"The Red Book" (comic strips from the mid-80s)
- Wolff & Byrd, Counselors of the Macabre: Supernatural Law (comic strips)
- Wolff & Byrd, Counselors of the Macabre: Case Files Volumes I-IV (#1–16)
- Tales of Supernatural Law (#1–8)
- The Soddyssey, And Other Tales of Supernatural Law (#9–16)
- Sonovawitch! and Other Tales of Supernatural Law (#17–22, Mavis #1)
- The Vampire Brat, And Other Tales of Supernatural Law (#23–29, Mavis #2)
- Mister Negativity, And Other Tales of Supernatural Law (#31–36, Mavis #3)
