= Supernatural Law =

Comic series by Batton Lash

Supernatural Law, formerly Wolff & Byrd, Counselors of the Macabre
- The cover of the compilation book Tales from the Vault, showing (left to right) Alanna Wolff, Jeff Byrd, and their secretary Mavis, with a group of monsters overlooking them.
- Author: Batton Lash
- Website: supernaturallaw.com exhibitapress.com
- Current status/schedule: Active
- Genre(s): Humor, Satire, Legal Procedural, Urban Fantasy

Supernatural Law, previously known as Wolff and Byrd, Counselors of the Macabre, is a comic strip, comic book and web comic series written and illustrated by Batton Lash. The series features the law practice of Alanna Wolff and Jeff Byrd, who specialize in serving the legal needs of monsters and other supernatural beings, or those who find themselves in conflict with such beings. Wolff and Byrd themselves are human, as is their secretary Mavis. The series tagline is "Beware the creatures of the night—they have lawyers!"

The series first appeared, as "Wolff and Byrd, Counselors of the Macabre", in The Brooklyn Paper in 1979. From 1983 to 1997 The National Law Journal ran the weekly strip. The characters made occasional appearances in comic books over the years (Mr. Monster, Munden's Bar Special, Satan's Six).

In May 1994 an ongoing comic book series was launched, Wolff and Byrd, Counselors of the Macabre, under the imprint Exhibit A Press. The title was changed to Supernatural Law with issue #24, in part to avoid readers' confusion over how to pronounce "macabre," and to bring it in line with the planned title of a motion picture adaptation. An occasional spin-off comic has also come out focusing on their secretary, Mavis. The strips and comics have been collected into a number of trade paperbacks with introductions by writers including Neil Gaiman and Will Eisner.

In 2005, a weekly Supernatural Law web comic began publishing on Webcomics Nation, in what Lash has described as an attempt to grow an audience outside of comics shops. After Webcomics Nation ceased operation, Supernatural Law moved to its own website.

Batton Lash writes and draws all the stories, with art assists by Trevor Nielson and Melissa Uran. The series is edited by Jackie Estrada. Mitch Berger, Esq. serves as legal consultant.

A 2009 collection of Wolff and Byrd stories, The Soddyssey, and Other Tales of Supernatural Law, won the Independent Book Publishers Association's Benjamin Franklin Award. The story contains guest art by Steve Bissette, Bernie Wrightson, Jeff Smith, Shawn McManus, Phil Hester, and Charles Vess.

== Collected editions ==
#	Title	Publisher	Year	ISBN	Reprints
1	Tales of Supernatural Law	Exhibit A Press	2005	ISBN 0-9633954-9-1	Wolff & Byrd, Counselors of the Macabre #1-8
2	The Soddyssey, And Other Tales of Supernatural Law	Exhibit A Press	2008	ISBN 978-0-9815519-0-6	Wolff & Byrd, Counselors of the Macabre #9-16
3	Sonovawitch!, and Other Tales of Supernatural Law	Exhibit A Press	2003	ISBN 0-9633954-6-7	Wolff & Byrd, Counselors of the Macabre #17-22 and Mavis #1
4	The Vampire Brat, and Other Tales of Supernatural Law	Exhibit A Press	2003	ISBN 0-9633954-7-5	Wolff & Byrd, Counselors of the Macabre #23, Supernatural Law #24-29, and Mavis #2
5	Mister Negativity and Other Tales of Supernatural Law	Exhibit A Press	2003	ISBN 0-9633954-8-3	Supernatural Law #31-36, and Mavis #3
6	The Monsters Meet on Court Street, and Other Tales of Supernatural Law	Exhibit A Press	2012	ISBN 978-09815519-1-3	Supernatural Law #30 & 37-40, and Mavis #4
7	A Vampire in Hollywood, and Other Tales of Supernatural Law	Exhibit A Press	2016	ISBN 0-9633954-7-5	Supernatural Law #41-45, and Mavis #5
8	The Werewolf of New York	Exhibit A Press	2013	ISBN 978-0-9815519-3-7	Collecting material previously published online at www.supernaturallaw.com
9	Zombie Wife, and Other Tales of Supernatural Law	Exhibit A Press	2014	ISBN 978-0-9815519-5-1	Collecting Supernatural Law #42-43 and material previously published online at www.supernaturallaw.com
10	Supernatural Law: Grandfathered In	Exhibit A Press	2018	ISBN 978-0-9815519-8-2	Parts of this story were previously published online at www.supernaturallaw.com
