= List of Top Cow Productions publications =

Top Cow Productions is an American comic book publishing company and an imprint of Image Comics.

== 0–9 ==
Title	Series	Issues	Dates	Notes	Reference
39 Minutes		#1	Sep 2010	Pilot Season	
7 Days from Hell		#1	Oct 2010	Pilot Season	

== A ==
- The Agency #1–6
- Angelus #1–6
- Angelus Pilot Season #1
- Aphrodite IX #0–4
  - Aphrodite IX vol.2, #1–11
- Aphrodite IX Pilot Season #1
- Aphrodite V #1–4
- Ascension #0–22
- Arcanum #1/2–8
- Artifacts #0–40
- A Voice in the Dark #1–7

== B ==
Title	Series	Issues	Dates	Notes	Reference
Ballistic	–	#1—3	September—November 1995		
Ballistic	Action	#1	May 1996		
Ballistic	Imagery	#1	January 1996		
Ballistic Studios Swimsuit Special	–	#1	May 1995		
Battle of the Planets	–	#1—12	July—September 2003	licensed to, but not owned by, Top Cow	
Battle of the Planets	Jason	#1	July 2003		
Battle of the Planets	Manga	#1—3	November 2003—January 2004		
Battle of the Planets	Mark	#1	May 2003	licensed to, but not owned by, Top Cow	
Battle of the Planets	Princess	#1—6	November 2004—May 2005	licensed to, but not owned by, Top Cow	
Battle of the Planets/	ThunderCats	#1	May 2003	co-published with WildStorm	
Battle of the Planets/	Witchblade: Savior	#1	February 2003		
Berserker	–	#0—16	February 2009—June 2010		
Blood Legacy	–	#1–4	May—November 2000		
Blood Legacy	The Young Ones	#1	April 2003		
Broken Trinity	–	#1—3	July—November 2008		
Broken Trinity	Aftermath	#1	April 2009		
Broken Trinity	Angelus	#1	December 2008		
Broken Trinity	The Darkness	#1	August 2008		
Broken Trinity	Pandora's Box	#1—6	February 2010—April 2011		
Broken Trinity	Prelude	–	May 2008	Free Comic Book Day exclusive	
Broken Trinity	Witchblade	#1	December 2008		
Bushido: The Way of the Warrior	–	#1—5	October 2013		
Butcher Knight	–	#1—4	December 2000—June 2001		

== C ==
- City of Heroes #1–20 (licensed to, but not owned by, Top Cow)
- Codename: Strykeforce #0–14
- Common Grounds #1–6
- Cyberforce #0–4
  - Cyberforce vol. 2, #1–35
  - Cyberforce vol. 3, #0–6
  - Cyberforce vol. 4, #1–11
- Cyberforce: Origins #1–3
- Cyblade Pilot Season #1
- Cyblade #1–4

== D ==
Title	Series	Issues	Dates	Notes	Reference
Dark Crossings	Dark Clouds Rising	#1	Jun 2000		
Dark Crossings	Dark Clouds Overhead	#1	Oct 2000		
Dark Sector: Zero		#1	Dec 2007	Prequel to the video game	
The Darkness	vol. 1	#0–40	Jul 1996 – Aug 2001	Ongoing series	
The Darkness	vol. 1	#½	Mar 2001	Ongoing series	
The Darkness	vol. 1	#75–116	Feb 2009 – Dec 2013	Ongoing series	
The Darkness	vol. 2	#1–24	Dec 2002 – Nov 2005	Ongoing series	
The Darkness	vol. 3	#1–10	Dec 2007 – Jan 2009	Ongoing series	
The Darkness	Black Sails	#1	Mar 2005		
The Darkness	Close Your Eyes	#1	Jun 2014		
The Darkness	Four Horsemen	#1–4	Aug 2010 – May 2011	Limited series	
The Darkness	Hope	#1	Apr 2016	One-shot	
The Darkness	Infinity	#1	Aug 1999		
The Darkness	Lodbrok's Hand	#1	Dec 2008	One-shot	
The Darkness	Level	#0–5	Dec 2006 – Aug 2007	Limited series	
The Darkness	Prelude	–	Nov 1997	American Entertainment exclusive	
The Darkness	Prelude	–	Apr 2003	Dynamic Forces exclusive	
The Darkness	Shadows and Flame	#1	Jan 2010	One-shot	
The Darkness	Vicious Traditions	#1	Mar 2014		
The Darkness	Wanted Dead	#1	Aug 2003		
The Darkness/	Batman	#1	Aug 1999	Co-published with DC Comics	
The Darkness/	Darkchylde	#1	May 2010		
The Darkness/	Eva	#1–4	Mar 2008 – Jun 2008	Limited series; co-published with Dynamite Entertainment	
The Darkness/	Hulk	#1	Jul 2004	Co-published with Marvel Comics	
The Darkness/	Pitt	#1–3	Aug 2009 – Nov 2009	Limited series	
The Darkness/	Superman	#1–2	Jan 2005 – Feb 2005	Co-published with DC Comics	
The Darkness/	Vampirella	#1	Jul 2005	Co-published with Harris Comics	
The Darkness/	Witchblade	#1–2	Dec 1999		
The Darkness/	Wolverine	#1	Sep 2006	Co-published with Marvel Comics	
The Darkness/Witchblade/Angelus – Trinity: Blood on the Sands		#1	Jun 2009		
The Darkness and Tomb Raider		#1	Apr 2005	Co-published with Dynamite Entertainment	
The Darkness II: Confession		#1	May 2011	Free Comic Book Day exclusive; prequel to the video game	
Down		#1–4	Dec 2005 – April 2006	Limited series	
Dragon Prince		#1–4	Sep 2008 – Jan 2009	Limited series	

== E ==
- Echoes #1–6
- EVO #1
- E.V.E. Protomecha
- Epoch #1–5

== F ==
- Fathom #0–14, ½, −6 (published by Top Cow, owned by Aspen MLT)
- Fathom Crossover Tour Book (published by Top Cow, owned by Aspen MLT)
- Fathom Killian's Tide #1–4 (published by Top Cow, owned by Aspen MLT)
- Fathom Swimsuit Special (published by Top Cow, owned by Aspen MLT)
- Freshmen #1–5
- Freshmen: Yearbook
- Fusion (crossover with Marvel Comics)

== G ==
Title	Series	Issues	Dates	Notes	Reference
Genius		#1	Jun 2008	Pilot Season	
God Complex		#1–6	Oct 2017 – Jun 2018		

== H ==
Title	Series	Issues	Dates	Notes	Reference
Hardcore		#1	May 2012	Pilot Season	
Human Kind		#1–5	Sep 2004 – Mar 2005	Limited series	
Hunter-Killer		#0–12	Nov 2004 – Mar 2007	Limited series	
Hunter-Killer	Dossier	#1	Sep 2005		
Hunter-Killer	Scriptbook	#1	Jun 2005		

== I ==
Title	Series	Issues	Dates	Notes	Reference
Impaler		#1–4	Dec 2008 – Mar 2010	Limited series	
In the Dust					
Inferno Hellbound		#1–3	Jul 2002 – Nov 2003		

== J ==
Title	Series	Issues	Dates	Notes	Reference
Jingle Belle: Santa Claus vs. Frankenstein		–	Dec 2008		

== K ==
Title	Series	Issues	Dates	Notes	Reference
Kin		#1–6	Mar 2000 – Sep 2000	Limited series	

== L ==
Title	Series	Issues	Dates	Notes	Reference
Legacy of Kain: Soul Reaver		–	Oct 1999	Prequel to the video game	
Lady Pendragon		#1	May 2008	Pilot Season	

== M ==
- The Magdalena #1–3 (April 2000–January 2001)
  - The Magdalena vol. 2, #1–4 (August–December 2003)
  - The Magdalena vol. 3, #1–12 (April 2010–May 2012)
  - The Magdalena vol. 4, #1–4 (March–June 2017)
- The Magdalena/Angelus #½ (August 2000)
  - The Magdalena/Angelus vol. 2, #½ (October 2001)
- The Magdalena/Daredevil #1 (May 2008)
- The Magdalena/Vampirella #1 (July 2003; co-published with Harris Comics)
  - The Magdalena/Vampirella vol. 2, #1 (December 2004; co-published with Harris Comics)
- Madame Mirage #1–6 (June 2007–May 2008)
- Midnight Nation #1–12 (October 2000–July 2002), ½ (April 2011, co-published with Joe's Comics)
- Misery Special (December 1995)
- Monster War (co-published with Dynamite Entertainment)
  - The Magdalena vs. Dracula #1 (June 2005)
  - Tomb Raider vs. The Wolf-Men #2 (July 2005)
  - Witchblade vs. Frankenstein #3 (August 2005)
  - The Darkness vs. Mr. Hyde #4 (September 2005)
- Mysterious Ways #1–6 (July–September 2011)
- Myth Warriors (November 2004)

== N ==
Title	Series	Issues	Dates	Notes	Reference
The Necromancer		#1–6	Sep 2005 – Jul 2006	Limited series	
The Necromancer		Pilot Season #1	Nov 2007	Pilot Season	
Netherworld		#1–5	May 2011 – Apr 2012	Limited series	
Nine Volt		#1–4	Jul 1997 – Oct 2007	Limited series	
No Honor		#1–4	Feb 2001 – Jul 2001	Limited series	

== O ==
Title	Series	Issues	Dates	Notes	Reference
Obergeist	Ragnarok Highway	#1	May 2001	Published under the Minotaur Comics imprint	
Obergeist	The Empty Locket	#1	Mar 2002	Published under the Minotaur Comics imprint	
Overkill: Witchblade/Aliens/Darkness/Predator		#1–2	Dec 2000 – Mar 2001	Limited series; co-published with Dark Horse Comics	

== P ==
- Pilot Season
- Proximity Effect #1–3
- Postal

== R ==
- Ravine #1–2
- Ripclaw #1–3, ½
  - Ripclaw vol. 2, #1–6
- Ripclaw Special
- Ripclaw Pilot Season #1
- Rising Stars #1–24 (Joe's Comics)
- Rising Stars: Bright #1–3
- Rising Stars: Untouchable
- Rising Stars: Voices of the Dead #1–5

== S ==
Title	Series	Issues	Dates	Notes	Reference
Soul Saga		#1–5	Feb 2000 – Apr 2001	Limited series	
Spirit of the Tao		#1–15	Jun 1998 – May 2000	Limited series	
Stealth		#1	May 2010	Pilot Season	
Stellar		#1	Jul 2010	Pilot Season	
Strykeforce		#1–5	May 2004 – Oct 2004	Limited series	
Sunstone	vol. 1	–	Dec 2004	Graphic novels; retitled Sunstone: Mercy from volume 6	
Sunstone	vol. 2	–	Apr 2015	Graphic novels; retitled Sunstone: Mercy from volume 6	
Sunstone	vol. 3	–	Aug 2015	Graphic novels; retitled Sunstone: Mercy from volume 6	
Sunstone	vol. 4	–	Feb 2016	Graphic novels; retitled Sunstone: Mercy from volume 6	
Sunstone	vol. 5	–	Jan 2017	Graphic novels; retitled Sunstone: Mercy from volume 6	
Sunstone	vol. 6	–	May 2019	Graphic novels; retitled Sunstone: Mercy from volume 6	
Sunstone	vol. 7	–	May 2021	Graphic novels; retitled Sunstone: Mercy from volume 6	

== T ==
- Tales of the Darkness #1–4, ½
- Tales of the Witchblade #1–9, ½
- Think Tank
- Tokyo Knights #1
- Tom Judge: The Rapture #1
- Tomb Raider #0–50, ½ (licensed to, but not owned by, Top Cow)
- Tomb Raider: Journeys #1–12
- Tomb Raider: Takeover #1
- Tracker
- Twilight Guardian #1–4

== U ==
- Unholy Union #1
- Universe #1–8
- Urban Myths #1

== V ==
- Velocity #1–3
  - Velocity vol. 2, #1–4
- Velocity Pilot Season #1
- V.I.C.E. #1–5

== W ==
- Wanted #1–6
- Weapon Zero #T-4 – 0
  - Weapon Zero vol. 2 #1–15
- Witchblade #½, 0–185, Annual #1–2
- Witchblade: Animated #1
- Witchblade: Blood Oath #1
- Witchblade: Demon #1
- Witchblade: Destiny's Child #1–3
- Witchblade: Infinity #1
- Witchblade: Nottingham #1
- Witchblade: Obakemono #1
- Witchblade: Origin Special
