= JLA/Cyberforce =

2005 comic book by DC Comics and Top Cow Comics

- Cover of JKLA/Cyberforce 1 (2005), art by Marc Silvestri

Publication information
- Publisher: DC Comics, Top Cow
- Format: One-shot
- Publication date: 2005
- No. of issues: 1

JLA/Cyberforce, was a one-shot comic book published in 2005 by DC Comics and Top Cow Comics.

JLA/Cyberforce was written by Joe Kelly. Internal art was by Doug Mahnke and Norm Rapmund. The cover was done by Marc Silvestri. Despite being a one-shot, the crossover is a continuation of the story that begins in volume 3 of Cyberforce, taking place between issues #0 and #1 of that title.

== Plot summary ==
The story of JLA/Cyberforce revolves around the Cyberforce fighting a horde of Cyber-Zombies that have invaded Budapest. The zombies' invasion soon prompts the attention of the Justice League who arrive to assist and to some extent awe, the Cyberforce. The two teams immediately gel and start working together to prevent the now-evil Ripclaw, a resurrected former member of the Cyberforce, and his Cyber-Zombies from obtaining Godtech. Godtech is a material that could make the Cyberforce immortal but it can also be abused to raise the dead. During the battle with Ripclaw, Martian Manhunter is mortally wounded during a moment of distraction. Godtech can revive him, however when the JLA attempt to do just that they must contend with the Cyberforce who want to use the Godtech to save their lost friend Ripclaw. Battle ensues and the Cyberforce find that they are unable to defeat the JLA. Velocity is able to use the Godtech to outrun the Flash and enter the lands of the dead to bring Martian Manhunter back to life. The teams part company amicably after this turn of events.

== Characters ==
JLA:

- Superman
- Batman
- Wonder Woman
- Martian Manhunter
- The Flash

Cyberforce:

- Stryker
- Velocity
- Cyblade
- Ballistic

Opponents

- Ripclaw - ex-Cyberforce
