= Michael Choi (comics) =

Korean comic book artist

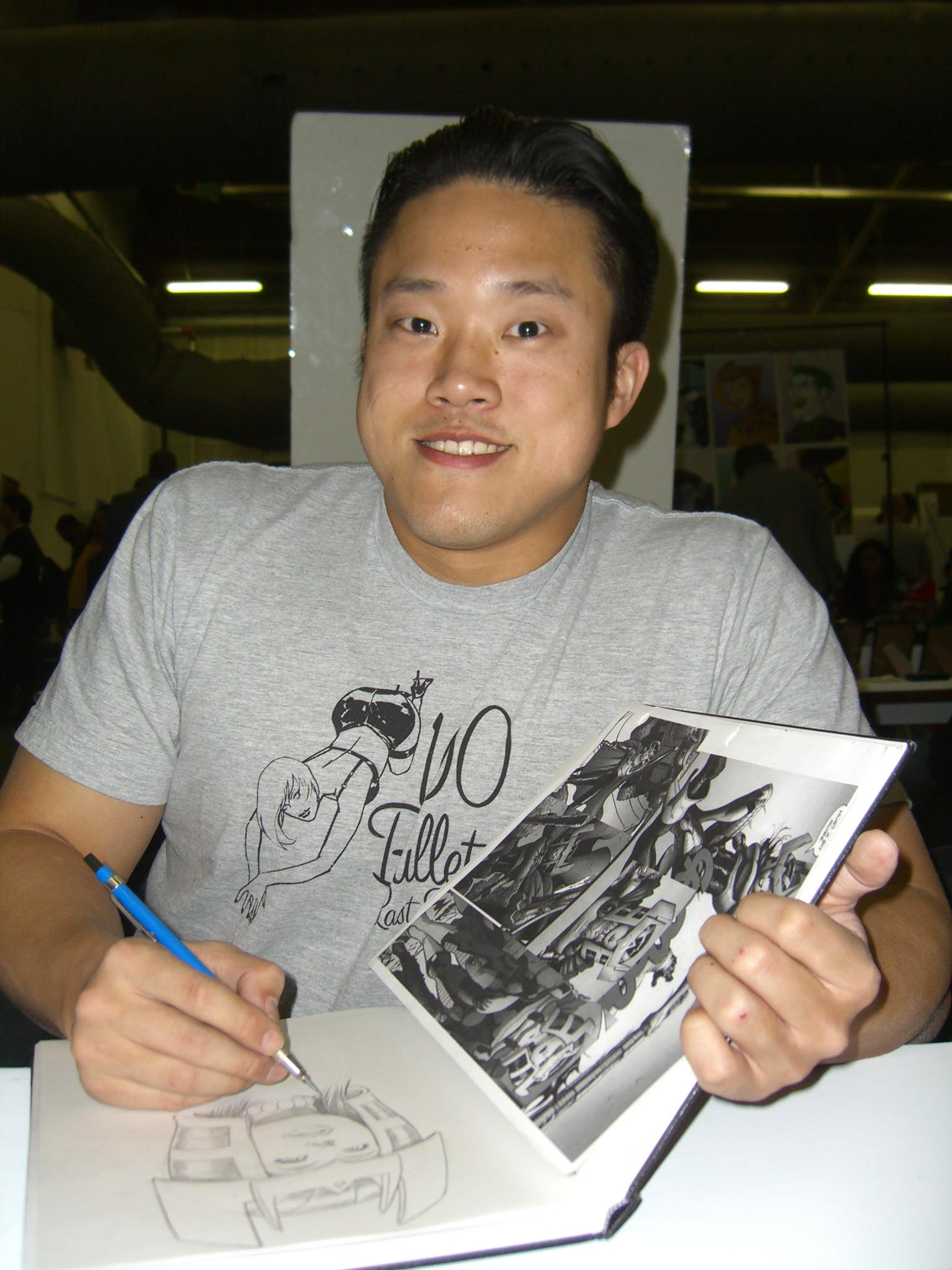
- Choi sketching Big Barda at the Big Apple Convention in Manhattan, October 17, 2009
- Areas: Penciller, Inker, Colourist
- Pseudonym: Mike Choi
- Notable works: Witchblade X-23 X-Force
- Relatives: Mary H.K. Choi (sister)

Michael Choi is a comic book artist and video game concept artist, known for his work on books by DC Comics, Marvel Comics and Top Cow Comics, such as Witchblade, X-23, and X-Force.

== Early life ==
Michael Choi is the brother of Mary H.K. Choi, a journalist and author who is known for her young adult novel Emergency Contact, as well as her work on comic books such as Lady Deadpool from Marvel Comics.

Michael Choi went to business school at The University of Texas at Austin, and graduated with a degree in Management Information Systems.

== Career ==
Choi worked at IBM for three years as an IT consultant before changing careers.

Choi penciled a six-issue Marvel entitled X-23: Target X limited series.

Michael Choi joined Marvel and penciled Uncanny X-Men from issue #495 to issue #499 with writer Ed Brubaker.

In the April 2007 issue of Wizard Magazine (#186) Choi was named number 10 of the "Hot 10 Artists" for his work on X-23: Target X. Said the magazine, "Choi pulls up the rear with his newly popular, vibrant pencils."

In 2010, Choi provided the illustrations in a pictorial featuring comedic actress Olivia Munn in the April/May 2010 issue of Complex magazine, and on its cover. The pictorial featured Munn interacting with illustrated animals in a forest setting, which were drawn by Choi and colored by Sonia Oback. Choi's approach to the visuals were inspired by the music video for the A-ha single "Take On Me".

In 2012, Choi provided the cover to Green Lantern vol. 5 #5, and guest pencilled issue #6.

In November 2013, Choi participated in his first gallery showing at Gallery Nucleus in Alhambra, California.

In March 2015, Kotaku named Choi as one of the 20 best X-Men artists over the 50-year history of the comic books.

In September 2021, Screen Rant also named Choi as one of the 10 best X-Men artists of all time.

== Bibliography ==
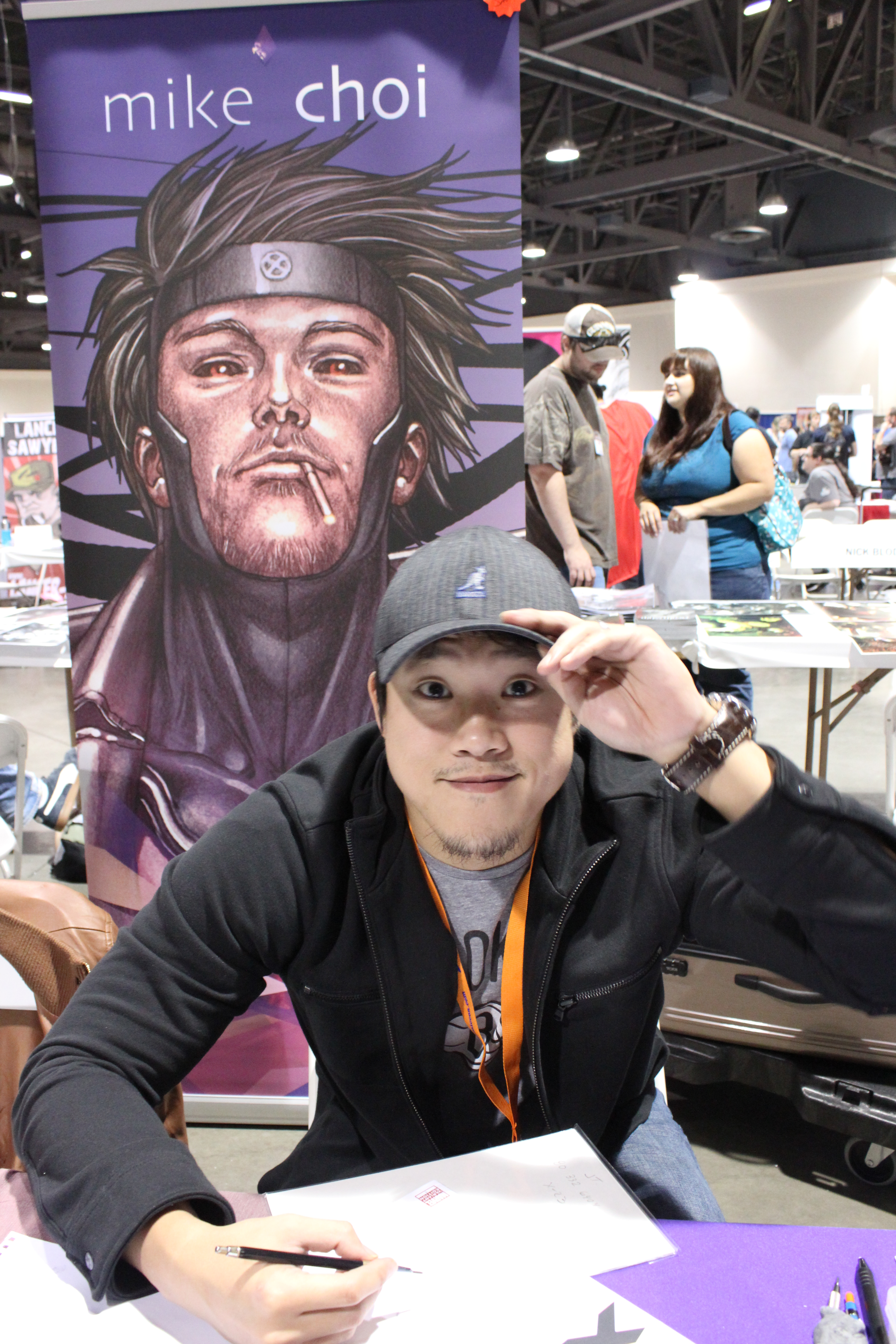
Choi in 2012

=== Interior work ===
- Witchblade (Top Cow):
  - "LXIV-LXV" (with David Wohl, Francis Manapul, Joel Gomez and Romano Molenaar, in #64-65, 2003)
  - "Road Trip, Part Two" (with David Wohl, Francis Manapul and Joel Gomez, in #69, 2003)
  - "Death Pool, Part One" (with David Wohl, Francis Manapul, Joel Gomez and David Nakayama, in #70, 2003)
  - "Strength and Weakness, Part One" (with Troy Hickman, in #76, 2004)
  - "Witch Hunt" (with Ron Marz, in #80-85, 2004–2005)
  - "Partners" (with Ron Marz, in #88, 2005)
  - "Fugitive" (with Ron Marz, in #89-91, 2005)
  - "10th Anniversary" (with Ron Marz and various artists, in #92, 2005)
  - "Reflections" (with Ron Marz, in #93, 2006)
  - "True Confessions" (with Ron Marz, in #96, 2006)
  - "Old Habits" (with Ron Marz, in #97-98, 2006)
  - "C" (with Ron Marz and various artists, in #100, 2006)
- The Magdalena #3 (with Brian Holguin, Eric Basaldua and David Nakayama, Top Cow, 2003)
- Knights of the Jaguar: A Tale from the Legend of Diablo (with Robert Place Napton, one-shot, 2004)
- The Darkness #7: "In Search of the Blue Goldfish, Part One" (with Paul Jenkins and Eric Basaldua, 2004)
- Tomb Raider: The Series #45: "Inner Demons" (with David Bonny, Top Cow, 2004)
- X23: Target X #1-6 (with Craig Kyle and Christopher Yost, Marvel, 2007)
- X-Men #204: "Blinded by the Light, Epilogue" (with Mike Carey, Marvel, 2007)
- Uncanny X-Men #495-499: "Divided" (with Ed Brubaker and Ben Oliver, Marvel, 2008)
- X-Force #7-10, 17-20, 26-28 (with Craig Kyle and Christopher Yost, Marvel, 2008–2010)
- X-Force/Cable: Messiah War (with Craig Kyle and Christopher Yost, one-shot, 2009)
- Nation X #2: "Wish You Were Here" (with C.B. Cebulski and Jim McCann, Marvel, 2010)
- Astonishing Thor #1-5 (with Robert Rodi, Marvel, 2011)
- Demon Knights #4: "Merlin Watches the Storm" (with Paul Cornell and Diogenes Neves, DC Comics, 2012)
- Green Lantern v5 #6: "The Other Hero" (with Geoff Johns, DC Comics, 2012)
- T.H.U.N.D.E.R. Agents v4 #5: "At Breath's End" (with Nick Spencer and Wes Craig, DC Comics, 2012)
- Fantastic Four #605.1: "Origin Story" (with Jonathan Hickman, Marvel, 2012)

=== Cover work ===
- The Magdalena #3 (Top Cow, 2001)
- Tomb Raider: The Series #16 (Top Cow, 2001)
- Helios: In with the New #3 (Top Cow, 2006)
- Witchblade #101, 113-115, 150 (Top Cow, 2006–2011)
- The Darkness: Level #5 (Top Cow, 2007)
- First Born #1 (Top Cow, 2007)
- Marvel Comics Presents #4 (Marvel, 2008)
- The Darkness #5 (Top Cow, 2008)
- Dark Avengers #2 (Marvel, 2009)
- Fusion #1, 3 (Top Cow, 2009)
- Cyberforce/Hunter-Killer #1 (Top Cow, 2009)
- War Machine #7 (Marvel, 2009)
- Dark Wolverine #76 (Marvel, 2009)
- War of Kings #5-6 (Marvel, 2009)
- Dark Reign: The List - Wolverine #1 (Marvel, 2009)
- Dark X-Men #4 (Marvel, 2010)
- Vengeance of the Moon Knight #7 (Marvel, 2010)
- X-Men: Legacy #236 (Marvel, 2010)
- Ultimate Comics: Thor #1 (Marvel, 2010)
- Spider-Island: Cloak & Dagger #1-2 (Marvel, 2011)
- Invincible Iron Man #510 (Marvel, 2012)
- Action Comics v2 #4 (DC Comics, 2012)
- Batman v2 #4 (DC Comics, 2012)
- Fantastic Four #601-604, 606-607 (Marvel, 2012)
- FF #13-17, 19-21 (Marvel, 2012)
- Demon Knights #5-10 (DC Comics, 2012)
- Green Lantern v5 #5 (DC Comics, 2012)
- The Flash v4 #6 (DC Comics, 2012)
- Captain Atom v4 #7-10 (DC Comics, 2012)
- Justice League #8 (DC Comics, 2012)
