= David Finch (comics) =

Canadian-born comics artist

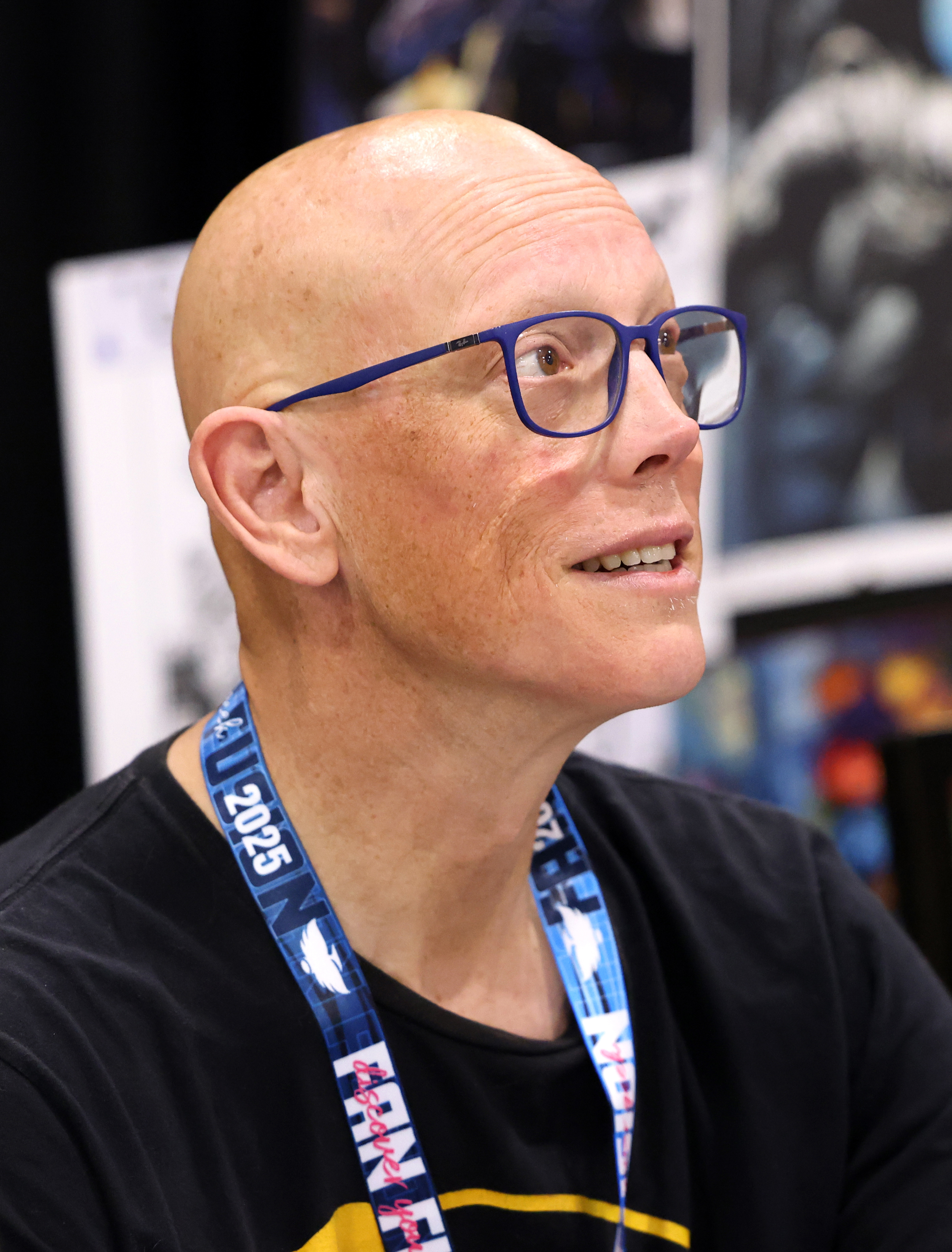
- Finch in 2025
- Born: July 4, 1971 (age 55) Montreal, Quebec, Canada
- Areas: Writer, Penciller, Inker
- Notable works: Batman: The Dark Knight; New Avengers; Batman
- Awards: 2009 Joe Shuster Award for Outstanding Artist
- Spouse: Meredith Finch

David Finch is a Canadian comics artist known for his work on Top Cow Productions' Cyberforce, as well as numerous subsequent titles for Marvel Comics and DC Comics, such as New Avengers, Moon Knight, Ultimatum, and Brightest Day. He has provided album cover art for the band Disturbed, and done concept art for films such as Watchmen.

== Career ==
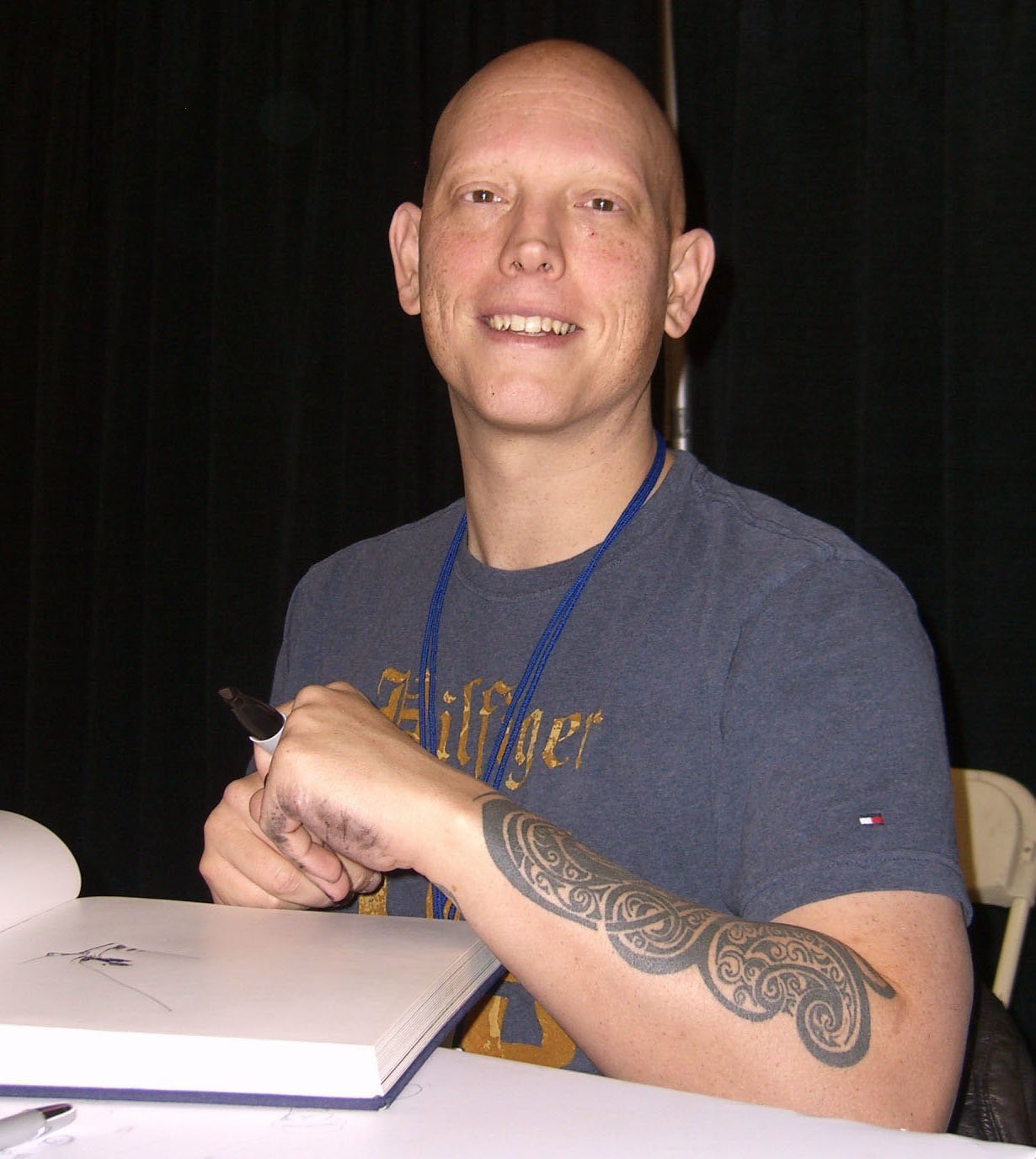
Finch at the New York Comic Con in Manhattan, October 10, 2010

David Finch started his comics career drawing Top Cow Productions' Cyberforce, after series creator and studio founder Marc Silvestri ceased his run as writer/artist on that book. Finch co-created Ascension with Matt "Batt" Banning. He later worked on the first three issues of Aphrodite IX with David Wohl.

In 2003, Finch returned to comics for a year-long arc on Ultimate X-Men with writer Brian Michael Bendis. Following that, the duo moved on to The Avengers, where they destroyed Marvel's premiere superhero team and then relaunched it as New Avengers featuring a radically different cast. On Avengers, Finch's presence doubled sales starting with his first issue.

Finch worked on the revamped Moon Knight series with novelist Charlie Huston His run on Moon Knight skyrocketed this title into the main Marvel universe and saw it sell over five times the titles previous releases. he then illustrated Fallen Son: The Death of Captain America #4, featuring Spider-Man. This was followed by the Ultimatum limited series for the Ultimate Marvel line. In addition to interior comics work, he has drawn several covers including those of "World War Hulk"; X-Men #200 and the "X-Men: Messiah Complex" storyline; and the X-Infernus miniseries.

Finch illustrated the cover to Disturbed's 2008 album, Indestructible, as well as doing concept design for the film adaptation of Alan Moore's Watchmen.

In January 2010, Finch left Marvel and became a DC Comics exclusive artist. Finch collaborated with Grant Morrison on Batman #700 (Aug. 2010) an oversized anniversary issue. In July 2010 DC announced that Finch would be writing and drawing a new ongoing series entitled Batman: The Dark Knight, the first story arc of which deals with the detective's more supernatural cases. The series launched with a January 2011 cover date, but was relaunched in November of that same year as part of the company-wide reboot The New 52.

In July 2012, as part of San Diego Comic-Con, Finch was one of six artists who, along with DC co-publishers Jim Lee and Dan DiDio, participated in the production of "Heroic Proportions", an episode of the Syfy reality television competition series Face Off, in which special effects were tasked to create a new superhero, with Finch and the other DC artists on hand to help them develop their ideas. The winning entry's character, Infernal Core by Anthony Kosar, was featured in Justice League Dark #16 (March 2013), which was published January 30, 2013. The episode premiered on January 22, 2013, as the second episode of the fourth season.

Finch and Geoff Johns launched a new Justice League of America series and the Forever Evil limited series in 2013. Finch and his wife, Meredith Finch, took over the creative duties on Wonder Woman beginning with issue #36 (Jan. 2015), their first collaborative effort.

As part of the DC Rebirth relaunch of DC's titles, Finch teamed with writer Tom King to launch the Batman vol. 3 series in June 2016.

In 2020, Finch drew the 1950s variant cover for The Joker 80th anniversary 100-page super spectacular #1 (June 2020). That July, Marvel Comics announced that it had acquired the publishing rights to the Alien and Predator franchises, for which Finch created two teaser posters.

== Influences ==
Finch was influenced by illustrator Gerald Brom.

== Personal life ==
Finch lives in Ontario. His wife is named Meredith, and they have three sons.

== Awards ==
Finch won a 2008 Eagle Award for Best Cover for his work on World War Hulk 1A.

He won the Joe Shuster Award for Outstanding Artist in 2009.

In 2017, Finch and Tom King won an Eisner Award for the Best Short Story "Good Boy" in Batman Annual #1.

Finch was given a Yellow Kid Award in 2000, presented at Lucca Comics & Games.

== Bibliography ==
=== Interior work ===
==== DC Comics ====
- Batman #700 (2010)
- Batman vol. 3 #1–5, 16–20, 24, 50, Annual #1 (2016–2018)
- Batman: The Return #1 (2010)
- Batman: The Dark Knight #1–5 (2010–2011)
- Batman: The Dark Knight vol. 2 #1–7, 9–15 (2011–2013)
- Forever Evil #1–7 (2013–2014)
- Justice League of America vol. 3 #1–3 (2013)
- Superman: War of the Supermen #0 (among other artists) (2010)
- Superman/Batman #75 (2010)
- Wonder Woman vol. 4 #36–42, 44–46, 48–50, Annual #1 (2014–2016)

==== Image Comics ====
- Aphrodite IX (full pencils): #0–2; (with Clarence Lansang): #3 (2000–2001)
- Ascension (full pencils): #1–5; (among other artists): #6–11 (1997–1999)
- Codename: Strikeforce #7 (1994)
- Cyberforce #15–22, 24–29, 31, Annual #1 (1994–1997)
- Darkness (pencil assists): #20–21; (full pencils): #39 (1999–2001)
- Ripclaw (Wizard special edition) #½ (1995)
- Tales of the Witchblade (with Billy Tan) #2 (1997)

===== Image Comics and DC Comics =====
- Darkness/Batman (1997)

===== Image Comics and Marvel Comics =====
- Witchblade/Elektra (1997)

==== Marvel Comics ====
- The Avengers #500–503 (2004)
- Call of Duty: The Brotherhood #1–6 (2002)
- Daredevil vol. 2 #65 (2004)
- Fallen Son: The Death of Captain America: Spider-Man (2007)
- Legion of Monsters: Morbius (Dracula/Lilith) #14 (2007)
- Moon Knight vol. 5 #1–8 (2006–2007)
- New Avengers #1–6, 11–13 (2005)
- Spider-Man Unlimited vol. 3 #14 (2006)
- Star Trek/X-Men (1996)
- Ultimate X-Men #27–28, 30, 34–45 (2003–2004)
- Ultimatum miniseries #1–5 (2008–2009)
- Uncanny X-Men ("Call of Duty") #406 (2002)
- Wolverine vol. 2 (Alpha Flight) #173, ("Call of Duty") #176 (2002)
- Wolverine #900 (2010)
- X-Men: Second Coming #1 (2010)
- X-Men Unlimited #35, 40 (2002–2003)

=== Cover work ===
==== DC Comics ====
- Action Comics #890, 900 (2011)
- Batman #72, 82 (2019)
- Batman/Catwoman #1(variant cover) (2020)
- Catwoman #17 (2019)
- Dark Nights: Death Metal #1- (variant cover) (2020-)
- DCeased: Dead Planet* #1 (2020)
- The Joker 80th anniversary 100-Page Super Spectacular #1 (variant cover) (2020)
- Justice League International #3-12 (2011-2012)

==== Marvel Comics ====
- The Amazing Spider-Man #549, 572 (variant cover) (2008)
- New Avengers #7 (2005)
- Non-Stop Spider-Man #1 (2020)
- Savage Avengers #1- (2019-)
- X-Men Unlimited #46 (2003)

Preceded by Marc Silvestri	Cyberforce artist 1994–1997	Succeeded by Kirk Van Wormer
Preceded by Scott Kolins	The Avengers artist 2004–2005	Succeeded by John Romita Jr.
Preceded by n/a	New Avengers artist 2005–2006	Succeeded by Frank Cho
Preceded by n/a	Batman: The Dark Knight artist 2011–2013	Succeeded by Ethan Van Sciver
Preceded by Cliff Chiang	Wonder Woman vol. 4 artist 2015–2016	Succeeded by Miguel Mendonça
