= Evo (comics) =

Evo, in comics, may refer to:

- EVO (comics), an Image Comics/Top Cow crossover

== See also ==
- Evo (disambiguation)
