= Pilot Season (comics) =

Comic book series from Top Cow Productions

- Cover of Velocity: Pilot Season 1 (Oct 2007), art by Kevin Maguire

Publication information
- Publisher: Top Cow Productions
- Formats: Original material for the series has been published as a set of one-shot comics.
- Publication date: August 2007

Reprints
- Collected editions
- Pilot Season 2007: ISBN 1-58240-900-5

Pilot Season was an annual initiative begun in 2007 by American comics publisher Top Cow Productions. Readers were able to vote on the future of six one-shot pilot comics released throughout the year. Voting took place on the Pilot Season MySpace page and the highest vote-getters later became ongoing series.

== 2007 ==
The entrants for the 2007 season were (winners in bold):

- **Cyblade #1** (W) Joshua Hale Fialkov (A) Rick Mays (Cov) Rick Mays
- **Velocity #1** (W) Joe Casey (A) Kevin Maguire (Cov) Kevin Maguire
  - Ripclaw #1,(W) Jason Aaron (A) Jorge Lucas (Cov) Tony Moore
  - Necromancer #1 (W) Joshua Ortega (A) Jonboy Meyers (Cov) Francis Manapul
  - The Angelus #1 (W) Ian Edginton (A) Stjepan Sejic (Cov) Stjepan Sejic
  - Aphrodite IX #1, (W) Dan Jevons (A) Eric Basaldua (pulled from schedule, never published as part of Pilot Season)

Over 4.1 million votes were received over the space of one month, beginning from December 17, 2007, and lasting until the closing date of January 21, 2008. Voters were allowed to vote as many times as they wanted. Although anyone was able to participate in online voting, those who had purchased the books themselves were able to increase their voting power by inputting special codes that appeared on their copies. These practices were not continued in Pilot Season 2008.

The protagonists in both of 2007's winning comics, Cyblade and Velocity, were characters spun off from Marc Silvestri's popular Cyber Force comic series. Both Cyblade and Velocity were slated for release as series in fall 2008. While Cyblade was released on schedule, Velocity suffered a series of delays.

Joshua Hale Fialkov and Rick Mays continued writing duties and art for Cyblade, and released a four issue miniseries.

Initially, Joe Casey resumed writing for Velocity, but ChrisCross took over from Kevin MacGuire on art. In December 2008, ChrisCross announced his resignation from the Velocity project due to "unforeseen differences". The series was officially cancelled in February 2009 without a single issue released. In an interview, writer Joe Casey indicated that he had written three issues, and ChrisCross had pencilled one, before "that famous Top Cow brand of common sense disappeared into an unexpectedly bizarre rift in time and space." He cited mass company dismissals of staff, including that of "our beloved editor", as contributing factors to the demise of the series. Following their departures from the title, Joe Casey and ChrisCross teamed up to create the DC Comics miniseries Final Crisis Aftermath: Dance.

In June 2010, Top Cow relaunched Velocity. Despite the new series being released under the Pilot Season banner, the creative team behind Velocity's 2007 win were not involved in this new incarnation. Instead, Ron Marz assumed writing duties, while Kenneth Rocafort was responsible for art. In a press release, Marz is quoted as saying "We're going to pay off Velocity's Pilot Season win with a story that's got her literally running for her life, and the lives of her teammates."

== 2008 ==
The entrants for the 2008 season were (winners in bold):

- **Twilight Guardian #1** (W) Troy Hickman (A) Reza (Cov) Hendry Prasetyo
- **Genius #1** (W) Marc Bernardin & Adam Freeman (A) Afua Richardson (Cov) Afua Richardson
  - Lady Pendragon #1 (W) Matt Hawkins (A) Eru (Cov) Drew Struzan
  - Alibi #1 (W) Joshua Hale Fialkov (A) Jeremy Haun (Cov) Jeremy Haun
  - The Core #1 (W) Jonathan Hickman (A) Kenneth Rocafort (Cov) Kenneth Rocafort
  - Urban Myths #1 (W) Jay Faerber (A) Jorge Molina (Cov) Jorge Molina

The 2008 season included 4 new original properties. Only 2 of the comic books, Twilight Guardian and Lady Pendragon, had a history of publication prior to participation in Pilot Season. This was a markedly different situation from the 2007 event, in which all five of the Pilot Season issues (along with the cancelled Aphrodite IX pilot issue) had been based upon pre-existing Top Cow characters.

The voting period ran from August 4 through to September 8, 2008. In a departure from the previous year's competition (which allowed people to vote as often as they liked), individual computers were only able to vote once per day.

The final distribution of votes has been detailed as follows:

- Twilight Guardian: 29%
- Genius: 24%
- Urban Myths: 22%
- The Core: 15%
- Lady Pendragon: 7%
- Alibi: 3%

Twilight Guardian's first issue post Pilot Season was released in January 2011.

Genius' first issue post Pilot Season was released on August 6, 2014.

According to Mel Caylo, Top Cow Vice President of Marketing & Sales, some entrants that did not win the 2008 competition may still have a future at the company. "While we have two, very clear winners in Twilight Guardian and Genius, voting for the other books was so fierce that it doesn't preclude us from ever doing something else with those properties down the road."

== 2009 ==
The entrants for the 2009 season were:

- Murderer #1 (W) Robert Kirkman (A) Nelson Blake II (Cov) Marc Silvestri
- Demonic #1 (W) Robert Kirkman (A) Joe Benitez (Cov) Marc Silvestri
- Stealth #1 (W) Robert Kirkman (A) Sheldon Mitchell (Cov) Marc Silvestri
- Stellar #1 (W) Robert Kirkman (A) Bernard Chang (Cov) Marc Silvestri
- Hardcore #1 (W) Robert Kirkman (A) Brian Stelfreeze (Cov) Marc Silvestri

Top Cow relaunched Pilot Season with major differences. In previous years, Pilot Season had been a competition between titles developed by a diverse roster of creative teams. All five Pilot Season titles released were written by Robert Kirkman, with covers by Marc Silvestri.

The first published issue, "Murderer", was released in December 2009. The rest were released over the course of 2010 with the exception of the final issue, Hardcore, which was due in 2010, but was finally released in May 2012. Image and Top Cow have no comment on the status of Pilot Season 2009 and 2010 moved ahead.

== 2010 ==
The entrants for the 2010 season were (winners in bold):

- **39 Minutes #1**
  - Forever #1
  - Crosshair #1
  - The Asset #1
  - 7 Days from Hell #1
  - Midway Earth #1 (pulled from schedule, never published as part of Pilot Season)

Issues were released much more quickly than previously, with the competing pilot issues released every week in the space of 5 weeks. Unlike the previous round, in which all comics were written by the same author, all issues from this round were written by different creative teams.

Voting took place in November 2010.

== 2011 ==
The entrants for the 2011 season were (winners in bold):

- **The Beauty**: A sexually transmitted disease emerges, which seemingly only makes the infected more beautiful and perfect... until the first person mysteriously dies.
  - The Test: A dozen people are selected to repopulate the world inside an enclosed neighborhood environment after a post apocalyptic event.
  - City of Refuge: In a post apocalyptic city where everyone is implanted with a chip that removes the human capacity for violence and only the internal security forces can take Freestone, a drug that removes the chip's effects; someone has released Freestone onto the streets.
  - Fleshdigger: Brett tried to save a woman and was killed for his trouble, but at his grave, the woman invokes dark magic and raises him as a teeming mass of worms to seek revenge on the ones who hurt both of them.
  - Theory of Everything: Scientist Charles Witten is recruited by a government task force to hunt down a group of dimension hopping thieves, using technology that Witten conceived, but was never able to get to work.
  - Misdirection: Vince Martinez is an ex-con, ex-NASCAR driver who is tricked into driving a getaway vehicle during a bank robbery, but he'll soon realize he's part of something MUCH larger.
  - Anonymous: A Special Forces operative who fakes his own death and tries to atone for his deeds by traveling the world and as an anonymous do-gooder using his old, lethal skill set.
  - Seraph: The protagonist is recruited by Heaven to be its soldier on Earth; imbued with great power, the soldier must live by the letter of God's Law to maintain his blessings, but sometimes his missions make it impossible for him to do so.

== Collected editions ==
The first season is being collected into a trade paperback:

- Pilot Season 2007 (144 pages, June 2008, ISBN 1-58240-900-5)

== Other media ==
=== Possible film adaptations ===
Although it didn't win and only one issue was released Alibi was optioned for a film by Mandeville Films who had produced the film Surrogates based on the comic book series of the same name.
