= A Voice in the Dark =

A Voice in the Dark may refer to:

- "A Voice in the Dark" (song), a 2010 single by Blind Guardian
- A Voice in the Dark, a track on the 2008 album Forever Magic by Fancy
- A Voice in the Dark (comic), an ongoing horror/thriller comic book series by Larime Taylor
- A Voice in the Dark (film), an American 1921 silent mystery film directed by Frank Lloyd

== See also ==
- Voices in the Dark, a compilation DVD set for Babylon 5: The Lost Tales
- Voices in the Dark, a Broadway play by John Pielmeier
