= Evos =

Evos or EVOS may refer to:

- EVOS Esports, an Indonesian professional e-sports team
- Ford Evos, a 2011 American concept coupe
- Ford Evos, former name of Ford Mondeo Sport, a 2021–present mid-size crossover SUV
- Nexplay EVOS, a Filipino e-sports team
- EVOS, a microscope made by Advanced Microscopy Group

== See also ==
- Evo (disambiguation)
