= Think Tank (comics) =

- Cover to Think Tank #1, art by Rahsan Ekedal

Publication information
- Publisher: Top Cow
- Schedule: Monthly
- Format: Limited series
- Genre: Science fiction comics
- Publication date: August 2012
- No. of issues: 20

Creative team
- Written by: Matt Hawkins
- Artist: Rahsan Ekedal

Think Tank is a comic book limited series created by writer Matt Hawkins and artist Rahsan Ekedal. It was published by Top Cow through Image Comics in August 2012. In 2013, Top Cow head Marc Silvestri said work had begun to turn the comic into a feature film.

The story is about a super intelligent government worker who decides he doesn't agree with the American governments notion of killing people for the greater good, and himself having a part in it by creating their weapons of mass destruction. He tries his best to divide himself from the military's control, but finds they are not willing to grant such an essential technical asset freedom.

== Publication history ==
Think Tank was solicited in May 2012 as a four issue limited series, but its run was extended to ten issues in August 2012. The first issue was published August 1, 2012. In July 2013, Hawkins and Ekedal said they were committed to doing twenty issues.

In the fall of 2016, Think Tank was part of a three-issue crossover limited series with two other comic titles created by Hawkins, The Tithe and Postal. It was co-written by Hawkins and Bryan Hill with art by Atilo Rojo, who Hawkins previously collaborated with on IXth Generation

== Plot ==
Dr. David Loren is a child prodigy and slacker genius who was recruited to design weapons for DARPA at age 14. Now that he's grown up, David's decided he doesn't want to build weapons anymore and wants to get the hell out. But the sociopathic USAF general who controls his life has… other ideas.

== Reception ==
Think Tank's first issue received mostly positive reviews. MultiversityComics.com reviewer Michelle White criticized the characterization of the supporting cast and unrealistic inventions, giving the issue a "browse" rating.
