= Velocity (character) =

Fictional character

- Cover of Velocity issue #1

Publication information
- Publisher: Top Cow (Image Comics)
- First appearance: Cyberforce #1 (Oct. 1992)
- Created by: Marc Silvestri

In-story information
- Alter ego: Carin Taylor
- Team affiliations: Cyberforce
- Abilities: Speed, healing factor

Velocity (real name Carin Taylor) is an Image Comics/Top Cow Productions superhero from the comic series Cyberforce, created by Marc Silvestri in 1992. Most of the early story arcs focused on her burgeoning friendship with the members of the Cyberforce team, and her struggle through teenage development. She is the younger sister of Ballistic.

== Publication history ==
After Cyberforce, Velocity was one of two winning one-shots in the first year of the Top Cow Pilot Season (2007), in a story written by Joe Casey with art by Kevin Maguire. Winning meant the character would get their own title, and it was announced that Casey would return and ChrisCross would provide the art. However, this team never completed an issue and the project was shelved until 2010.

== Fictional character biography ==
Like the rest of the Cyberforce team, Velocity was cybernetically enhanced by Cyberdata, a global corporation which created advanced cybernetics technology and employed it to create "Special Hazardous Operations Cyborgs", or SHOCs. Velocity's induction into the SHOCs program endowed her with supersonic speed and movement, much like DC Comics character the Flash. A layer of Kevlar was implanted beneath her skin to combat the friction generated by her high speeds. Despite the level of SHOC development Velocity underwent, she was never made a fully operational SHOC, as her psychological profile was never wiped and re-instated into the amoral and obedient state Cyberdata preferred.

Velocity's memories were apparently suppressed rather than fully erased. Under duress, she began to recover fragments of her memories. She has vignettes of her life as a child, playing ball with her sister and father, and already beginning to display her power. Another vignette reveals that her father left, or died, and her mother entered into a relationship with an unnamed abusive man. Her sister later kills this abusive man, while Velocity runs at super-speed to find a police officer.

At her introduction, Velocity is sixteen years of age and a runaway from the Cyberdata forces. Initially, it was not revealed that Cassie Lane (a.k.a. Ballistic) is Carin's sister. Ballistic presumably adopted a different surname to distance herself from the memory of their father, Frank Taylor, abandoning them. Both sisters wound up in an orphanage run by Mother May I, a mysterious Cyberdata operative with a red third eye in the middle of her forehead. During this time Velocity received the lightning tattoo over her eye, a gift from the resident bully of the orphanage. Soon afterwards, Mother May I saw Carin's potential for cybernetic enhancement and she was given or sold to Cyberdata. Velocity seems to spend a fair amount of time being captured by Cyberdata and subsequently rescued, although in such shenanigans more bits of her history and possible futures are revealed (in issue #11, a virtual-reality simulation shows what Velocity might have become had her conversion to a SHOC been completed). She was SHOC-trained and implanted with a Brain Box, a Cyberdata invention that overcame the difficulties in adjusting to cybernetic implants. Primarily, in Carin's case, the Brain Box allowed her to run faster without overloading her brain or body with the chemicals naturally produced by the body with any muscle movement. It also allowed her to make directional adjustments to avoid obstacles when travelling at high speeds.

Velocity had her own limited series in 1995; she is assisted in part by Savage Dragon.

=== Shattered Image ===
Around this time Velocity is one of the few superheroes actively aware that reality was breaking down into six different sub-Earths. She works with the few others aware of this, such as Savage Dragon, Shadowhawk, Ripclaw, Spawn, Barbaric, Savant and Zealot. Velocity and her teammate represent one of the six realities, and ultimately Ripclaw convinces her to follow Heatwave's recommendation and let their earth go off on its own. Despite this, their world reforms with the other 'continuities' soon after.

=== Cyberforce ===
In the first series of Cyberforce, in issue #30, Carin hints in her journal of an attraction to Heatwave (a.k.a. Dylan Cruise), although this was construed as a mere crush as Carin was underage at the time. Later in the series, affections begin to manifest between Ripclaw (a.k.a. Robert Bearclaw/Berresford) and Carin, although this was never realised because the comic's first series ended shortly after. The second volume closed with Ripclaw and Velocity heading towards Antarctica in search of the alien technology usurped by Cyberdata which eventually led to the development of Cyberforce and the other SHOCs.

=== Cyberforce Volume 3: Rising From the Ashes ===
In the third volume of Cyberforce, released in June, 2006, Cyberdata is finally destroyed. However, the company releases a failsafe virus meant to kill all those on the planet infected with the alien technology. In this Marc Silvestri re-introduction of Cyberforce, Ripclaw and Velocity are betrayed by the captain of the vessel that helped them reach Antarctica, and flee to the ruins. Once inside, the tunnel collapses, burying them alive. Ripclaw, weakened by the virus, is killed by the captain of the ship. Carin kills the captain and buries Ripclaw in a shallow grave, resigning herself to die.

Carin then undergoes a transformation in the ruins of the alien ship which removes the tattoo scar from over her eye and gives her a different, older look. The previously established relationship between herself and Ripclaw is tentatively explored during the first story arc, where the two are seen holding hands and embracing one another.

=== First Born ===
In the First Born limited series, Velocity was briefly taken over by the Angelus until it was driven out by Cyblade.

=== Cyberforce/Hunter-Killer ===
Carin was the first to become alerted when Cyberforce's base on Mikquit Island was attacked by a Hunter-Killer squad. She took point and grabbed Samantha Argent and dragged her off, until Architect stopped her by restructuring the island. When the two teams started working together against Morningstar and Cyberdata she, Cyblade and Samantha attacked Cyberdata's San Francisco server. However she was captured and, along with Cyblade and Wolf, connected to Cyberdata's server in order that Cyberdata could speak through them. When she was released, it was revealed that she and 12 million others worldwide were being mind-controlled and given new Ultra-Sapien abilities via their Jett phones. She recovered when Damper plugged himself into the Jett network.

== Powers and abilities ==
Carin can run at speeds in excess of 10,000 miles per hour (16,000 km/h), but has yet to max-out her speed for fear that she could rip the world to pieces. She has been shown to sustain speeds in excess of Mach 3, as when she destroyed a warship from within while saving Cyberforce from an updated killer robot. Cyberdata cybernetically implanted layers of Kevlar under her skin to avoid friction burns. Her speed also grants her super-fast reflexes. In issue #31, when she spends a day with her sister Cassie, Carin also demonstrates that her eyes can move at an incredible pace as well, allowing her to follow the path of a card while playing a game of three-card monte. The Brain Box also enhances her reaction time and ability to process sensory input, so she will be able to control herself and understand what she sees and hears when moving at high speed.

Lately she has gained Ultra-Sapiens abilities. When activated, these allow her to sprout sharp ridges along the outer length of her arms and legs, as well as the ability to quickly heal from injuries.

== Limited series ==
- Velocity, Vol. I, #1–3 (November 1995 – January 1996)
- Velocity, Vol. II, #1–4 (June 2010 – April 2011)
