= Civil War: The Initiative =

Comic book crossover storyline

- Marc Silvestri cover to Civil War: The Initiative #1 (April 2007)
- Publisher: Marvel Comics
- Publication date: March 2007 – March 2008
- Genre: Superhero; Crossover
Title(s)
Avengers: The Initiative #1–3
Black Panther vol. 4, #26–30
Captain America vol. 5, #26–30
Civil War: Battle Damage Report #1
Civil War: Front Line #11
Civil War: The Initiative #1
Daily Bugle: Civil War Aftermath
Deadpool/GLI: Summer Fun #1
Fantastic Four #544–550
Iron Man #15–18
The Invincible Iron Man #17–18
Irredeemable Ant-Man #7–9
Marvel Spotlight: Civil War Aftermath #1
Mighty Avengers #1–6
Moon Knight vol. 5, #11–13
Ms. Marvel vol. 2, #13–17
New Avengers #27–31
New Warriors vol. 4, #1–8
Nova vol. 4, #2–3
Omega Flight #1–5
The Order #1–4
Punisher War Journal vol. 2, #6–11
She-Hulk vol. 2, #15–18
Sub-Mariner vol. 2, #1–6
Thor #3
Thunderbolts vol. 2, #110–115
Marvel Previews Special Initiative Edition #1
- Main character(s): Iron Man; The Collective; Sasquatch; Thunderbolts; Ms. Marvel; Spider-Woman

Creative team
- Writer(s): Brian Michael Bendis; Warren Ellis
- Penciller: Marc Silvestri
- Inker(s): Joe Weems; Marco Galli; Rick Basaldua
- Colorist: Frank D'Armata

Civil War: The Initiative is a 2007–2008 comic book crossover storyline published by Marvel Comics. Running through a number of Marvel's then-ongoing monthly series, as well as numerous tie-in books, the story, which was initiated by an eponymous one-shot, serves as an epilogue to Marvel's "Civil War" storyline and as a launch point for new series such as the Mighty Avengers, New Avengers, Omega Flight, and Thunderbolts.

The one-shot is written by Brian Michael Bendis and Warren Ellis, with pencil art by Marc Silvestri. Centered on Iron Man, its story is divided into three segments. In the first segment, mutant Michael Pointer, who killed the Canadian superhero team Alpha Flight and thousands of others while under the control of Xorn, is given a chance to atone for his actions. The second segment, written by Warren Ellis, showcases the Thunderbolts, conscripted supervillains working for the government, in pursuit of unregistered superhumans. The third and final segment shows a meeting between Ms. Marvel, a staunch ally of Iron Man, and Spider-Woman, one of Captain America's Secret Avengers.

In addition to the main story, the comic includes promotional previews for other titles linked to Civil War – Iron Man, Captain America, Mighty Avengers, Omega Flight and Avengers: The Initiative.

== List of comics ==
The following is a list of comic books that carry The Initiative banner:

- Avengers: The Initiative #1–3
- Black Panther (vol. 4) #26–30
- Captain America (vol. 5) #25–30
- Fantastic Four #544–550
- Iron Man (vol. 4) #15–18
- Mighty Avengers #1–6
- Moon Knight (vol. 5) #11–13
- Ms. Marvel (vol. 2) #13–17
- New Avengers #28–31
- New Warriors (vol. 4) #1–8
- Nova (vol. 4) #2–3
- Omega Flight #1–5
- The Order #1–4
- Punisher War Journal (vol. 2) #6–11
- Sub-Mariner (vol. 2) #1–6
- Thunderbolts #112–115
