= Billy Tan =

Malaysian comic book artist

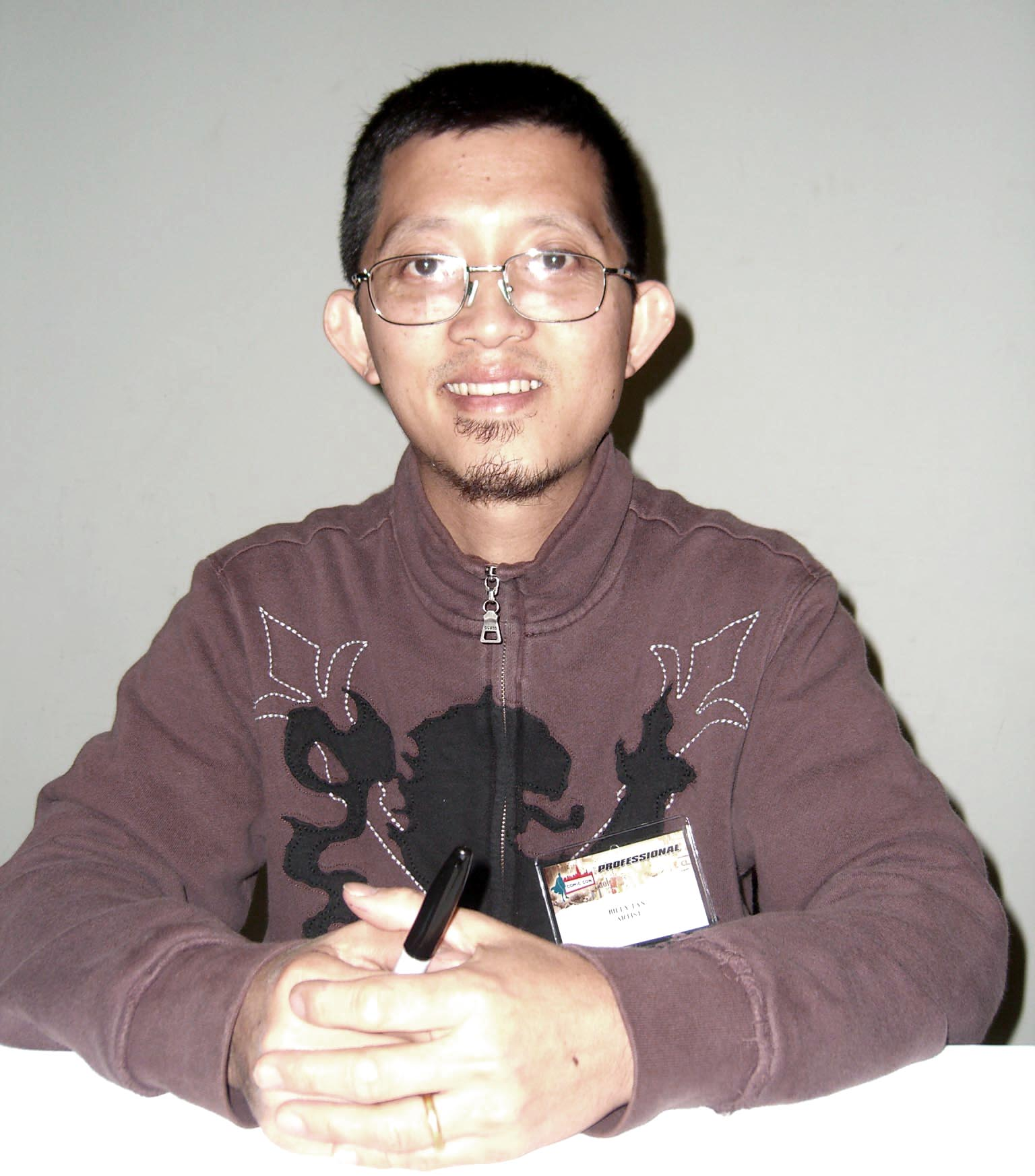
- Tan at the Big Apple Convention in Manhattan, October 17, 2009
- Born: Billy Tan Mung Khoy
- Area: Artist
- Children: Gavin Tan (eldest son) Unnamed Daughter

Billy Tan Mung Khoy, commonly known as Billy Tan, is a Malaysian comic book artist.

== Early life ==
Billy Tan was born in Malaysia and moved to the United States when he was 18, in 1989 to study business at the University of Kentucky. He began working as a penciler for Image Comics in the 1990s.

== Career ==
Tan became the regular artist of the Marvel Comics series Uncanny X-Men in 2006. In 2008, he was invited to draw the New Avengers issues #41 and 43-44 that tied into the "Secret Invasion" storyline, before being offered to replace Leinil Francis Yu as the new regular artist on the title.

Tan took over the flagship Green Lantern title as ongoing penciller beginning with issue #21. He works together with writer Robert Venditti, who replaced Geoff Johns as series writer.

== Bibliography ==
=== Image ===
- 21 #1-2 (full art); #3 (along with Marc Silvestri) (1996)
- Codename: Stryke Force #9-13 (1994–95)
- Cyberforce/Stryke Force: Opposing Forces #1-2 (1995)
- Darkness/Tomb Raider Special, one-shot (2005)
- Ripclaw #3 (1995)
- Spirit of the Tao #2 (1998)
- Tales of the Witchblade #2-4, 6 (1997–98)
- Tomb Raider #7, 11-12 (2000–01)
- Tomb Raider: Arabian Nights, one-shot (2004)
- Tomb Raider/Darkness Special, one-shot (2001)
- Witchblade #36 (1999), #100 (1-page, among other artists) (2006)
- Witchblade: Obakemono, one-shot (2002)

=== Marvel ===
- Dark Reign: The List: Daredevil, one-shot (2009)
- Marvel Knights Spider-Man #13-18 (2005)
- New Avengers #41, 43–44, 46-54 (2008–09)
- New Avengers Finale (2-pages among other artists) (2010)
- Shadowland, miniseries, #1-5 (2010)
- Star Trek/X-Men, one-shot (among other artists) (1996)
- Thor #604-609 (2010)
- Ultimate Comics Fallout #5 (2011)
- Uncanny X-Men #469-471, 475–476, 478–479, 481–482, 484–486, 492-494 (2006–08)
- X-23, miniseries, #1-6 (2005)
- Uncanny X-Force #8-10 (2011)
- X-Men: Legacy #209 (2008)
- Ultimate Comics: The Ultimates #13 (2012)
- A+X #3 (2012)
- Iron Fist: Heart of the Dragon #1-6 (covers only) (2021)

=== Image/Marvel ===
- Elektra/Cyblade, one-shot (1997)

=== DC Comics ===
- Green Lantern vol 5. #21-26, 28–29, 31–35, 39–42, 44–50, 52, Annual #3 (2013–2016)
- New Superman #7-8,11-14
