= Postal (comics) =

American comic book series

- Mark featured on the cover to issue 7 Art by Isaac Goodhart.

Publication information
- Publisher: Top Cow Productions
- Schedule: Monthly
- Format: Ongoing
- Genre: Crime
- Publication date: February 2015 – January 2018
- No. of issues: 27

Creative team
- Written by: Matt Hawkins; Bryan Hill
- Artist: Isaac Goodhart
- Letterer: Troy Peteri
- Colorist(s): Betsy Gonia; K Michael Russell
- Editor(s): Betsy Gonia; Ryan Cady; Ashley Victoria Robinson

Collected editions
- Volume 1: ISBN 978-1632153425
- Volume 2: ISBN 978-1632155924
- Volume 3: ISBN 978-1632157102
- Volume 4: ISBN 978-1534300255
- Volume 5: ISBN 978-1534302167
- Volume 6: ISBN 978-1534303485
- Volume 7: ISBN 978-1534308039

Postal is an American comic book series created by Matt Hawkins, Bryan Hill, and Isaac Goodhart and published by Top Cow Productions, a partner studio of Image Comics. The first issue was released in February 2015 and new installments were released on a near-monthly basis until its conclusion at issue 25 in January 2018. The characters and setting were also part of a three-issue limited series, Eden's Fall, in the Fall of 2016. Two one-shot issues were published as an epilogue in February and March 2018. A second volume of the comic is planned for 2019. The series has been collected in seven soft cover volumes and a television adaptation is in development for Hulu.

The story is set in Eden, Wyoming, a fictional town where ex-convicts secretly live together in peace. Residents must abide by the mayor's strict rules, and any crime is severely punished. Mark, the lead character, has Asperger syndrome and is both the mayor's son and the town's mail carrier. His violent father, who founded the town before being exiled from it, returns for revenge on Mark's mother and the town. As his parents struggle to influence him, Mark becomes more independent and assertive. When his mother triumphs over his father, she retires and Mark assumes her role in Eden.

Postal debuted to mixed reviews from critics who found it to be contrived and predictable. As the series progressed, reviewers drew attention to the story's exploration of complicated moral issues. By its conclusion, both the writing and art were noted for their improvement.

== Publication history ==
The concept behind Postal was created by Matt Hawkins, who is also the president of Top Cow Productions. He drew inspiration from television shows Northern Exposure, Twin Peaks, and True Detective. When Hawkins asked Bryan Hill to co-write the story, Hill accepted because he thought the quiet drama of the story would be challenging, saying that quiet drama does not come naturally to him. Hawkins based the lead character on his college roommate, a smart man with Aspergers whose behavior was mocked by other students. To ensure he wrote the condition authentically without being offensive, Hill researched the condition and spoke with people who have dealt with it. The two writers chose to work with Isaac Goodhart, who had won Top Cow's annual talent hunt contest in 2014, because of his artistic style. In a 2016 interview, Hill described Postal as "a Norman Rockwell painting, if there was blood in it."

The series was formally announced as a four-issue limited series on November 10, 2014. The first issue was released in February 2015 and sold an estimated 14,000 physical copies, selling out at the distributor level. Subsequent issues continued to sell out, prompting the series to switch to an ongoing monthly series. Digital copies of the first issue were temporarily available for free as part of the In-Store Convention Kick-off event held in March 2016, then again in September 2016 when the television adaptation for Hulu was announced. In November 2015, a special one-shot issue titled Postal: Dossier featured a comic story with art by Atilio Rojo that served as a Frame story to prose dossiers on important characters. Beginning with #12, Hawkins removed his name from the credits as writer because Hill was doing most of the work. Although Hawkins still gave input on the story and dialogue, he called Hill a "dialogue wizard". Hill said the book was hard to write because it was unpleasant exploring the "darker aspects of humanity" in the story.

In the fall of 2016, Eden's Fall was a three-issue crossover limited series that tied Postal to two other comic titles created by Hawkins, The Tithe and Think Tank. It was co-written by Hawkins and Hill with art by Atilo Rojo. The three series were not initially conceived as a shared universe, but they share similar themes and Hawkins said it "made sense" to mix them together because they are all "down to Earth thrillers". Following the conclusion of Eden's Fall, subsequent issues of each series included an icon indicating they were part of the "Eden-verse".

The series concluded with issue #25 in January 2018. It was followed by two one shots, Postal: Mark by Hawkins and Rojo and Postal: Laura by Hill and Goodhart, that served as epilogues. Hawkins returned to write the Mark issue because the interactions between Mark and his parents were his favorite parts of the story. Hawkins and Hill started developing the second volume in early 2018, and were looking to release next year, while looking for a new artist for the series, as Isaac Goodhart was not expected to return.

Although initial monthly sales were strong, Hawkins said that later sales were more oriented toward the softcover collections that were released during serialization. Each softcover contains four issues worth of material and first became available about a month after the release of the final issue included within it. As orders for individual issues declined, sales of the collections were consistent and growing in the book market and for online retailers like Amazon.

The first issue of the second volume of the series was released in July 2019, titled Postal: Deliverance, with Raffaele Ienco as the new artist.

== Plot ==
In the early 1970s, criminals Isaac and Laura Shiffron help FBI agent Jon Schultz hide five million dollars in gold bars he stole from a crime scene. In exchange, Schultz agrees to use his position of power to prevent outside authorities from investigating anything in the small town of Eden, Wyoming. Isaac and Laura turn Eden into a safe haven for convicts who live by their strict laws and religious ideals. Punishment for disobedience is severe because any criminal activity within Eden may bring attention to the city. When Isaac begins to abuse his authority, Laura and most of the town try to kill him, but he escapes. Laura was pregnant at this time, but gives her baby daughter away because she did not want another part of Isaac to remain in town. She keeps Mark, her toddler with Asperger's syndrome, and becomes Eden's mayor.

Years later, Mark has become Eden's mail carrier and is treated badly by everyone in town except for Maggie, a young waitress at the town's diner and Mark's love interest. Life in the town is disrupted when Isaac leaves his daughter's dead body in front of the town church. With the help of some secret loyalists in Eden, Isaac asks Mark to meet him. Isaac tells Mark that Laura has raised him to be weak, but that he has strength buried inside. They beat Mark and leave him hanging from a tree in Laura's yard. Isaac says surviving the experience will prove how strong Mark is, and it will punish Laura by making Mark more like him.

After his recovery, Mark realizes his Asperger's gives him a unique view of the world and allows him to see details and patterns that others do not. He begins using his talents to expose some troublemakers and start new friendships. He also starts to openly pursue Maggie, who explains that she was a leader in a heroin running gang in Los Angeles before being caught and sent to Eden. She returns some of his affection, but also sees Mark as a way for her to gain some power in Eden.

When Schultz's sociopathic daughter Molly needs to hide from some Armenian gangsters, Schultz threatens to renege on their deal if Laura does not protect her. Shortly after arriving in Eden, Molly murders two people and Laura is unable to explain why she is not punished because most of the town is unaware of her arrangement with Schultz. After Molly assaults Maggie, Mark discovers that Molly feels love toward her father. He has a prison cell built in an abandoned mine shaft and promises to kill her father if she does not remain there. Once a week, he brings her a phone so she can tell her father that she is safe and happy.

Because of Isaac's return and other events, some townspeople begin to lose faith in Laura as a leader. She collapses from stress and Eden's doctor suggests she prepare a succession plan. He tells her that no one fears Mark, and that Maggie would be a better choice. Instead, Laura makes Mark the temporary Mayor so she can see how he performs. Mark is unhappy in this role. Soon thereafter, Molly escapes her prison and tries to kill Laura. Mark and Maggie intervene and kill Molly. In exchange for saving her life, Laura agrees to resume her duties as Mayor.

Meanwhile, FBI Agent Bremble has been trying to investigate Eden. Tired of being stonewalled by his superiors, he goes rogue and locates Isaac. Although Bremble despises Isaac, they agree to work together because they both want to destroy Eden - Bremble because it offends his sense of justice, and Isaac because it is not what he intended it to become. Together they threaten Schultz, who tells Laura that he is scared and wants to run away with his money and daughter. Laura kills him instead. When Isaac and Bremble invade Eden, Bremble kills Isaac's other followers. Laura publicly reveals that Bremble has been her mole the whole time, then beats Isaac with a shotgun. This event restores the town's faith in her leadership.

Later, Laura fakes her death and leaves Eden with her lover, Sheriff Magnum. Mark begins acting as the mayor with the town's support and learns Maggie is pregnant. He does not want his family line to continue, but she wants to have a child. Mark agrees to keep her happy. To prevent his father from corrupting his child, Mark has Isaac brought to him and uses a screwdriver to give Isaac a lobotomy. Maggie miscarries soon after and becomes the new sheriff of Eden. She is called to a murder scene where a man has killed his wife. Maggie kills him, then finds their newborn daughter in a crib. She and Mark adopt the child.

In Postal: Deliverance, Mark and Maggie struggle with their respective roles as mayor and sheriff of Eden while also trying to raise a child. Meanwhile, Laura and Marcum attempt to enjoy their retirement in Florida when a young boy in danger awakens Laura's violently protective instincts.

== Critical reception ==
According to review aggregator Comic Book Roundup, the first issue of the series received an average score of 7.4/10 based on 19 reviews. The majority of the critic reviews were positive. The series as a whole averages 8.3/10, based on 103 reviews.

Graphic Policy praised the writers for "making characters that are easily to empathize with from the get go" and felt that there was "very little wrong with this first issue, and is one of the strongest lead-ins to a new story that the medium has seen in a while." The visuals were described as "strong" by Unleash the Fanboy reviewer Harrison Rawdin, but in his review for Comic Book Resources, Matt Little felt Goodhart's background as a storyboard artist led to a lack of variation in panel sizes which minimized the impact of some scenes. The characters were also praised by Rawdin, although Mark's portrayal was described as "borderline stereotypical" in Sam Graven's review for Big Comic Page. Graven also felt that the series' premise was "contrived." However, David Brooke of AIPT described the series as possessing "a very strong protagonist" and "a premise that holds a lot of potential in what is turning out to be an addictive mystery." Bob Bretall of Comic Spectrum acknowledged that "this book isn't going to be everyone's cup of tea" but still recommended it as "a solid read with a lot of well-written and very unique characters." Aaron Halverson of Comic Bastards praised the writing as "phenomenal" and complimented the series for turning a genre associated with mindless violence into "something smart and interesting."

As the series progressed, reviewers focused on the story's themes. The "uneasy moral questions" explored by Hill were appealing to Newsarama reviewer CK Stewart. Daniel Gehen told readers that Postal explored "religious extremism, hate crimes, and redemption" among other concepts in a review for Comics Bulletin. The observations align with Hill's stated intention to model Eden's morality after that found in the Old Testament, which he feels would be horrifying to modern society. While the premise of Eden interested David Pepose, he said in a review for Newsarama that the real draw was Mark and his Asperger's.

The resolution of the main storyline in Issue 25 was praised in a review for Spartantown by Enrique Rea and the subsequent epilogue issues were generally well received. Although Rea found the climactic battle in Issue 24 to be too brief and too convenient to be satisfying, he praised the comic's finale as "shocking and heart wrenching" and the overall narrative as "compelling." Goodhart was noted for his artistic improvement over the course of the series in Nick Nafpliotis' review for Adventures in Poor Taste, who described issue 25 as his best work yet. Michael Mazzacane agreed in a review for Multiversity Comics, saying that Goodhart's panel layouts did a good job of controlling the narrative pace. Stewart described the work of colorist K Michael Russell in issue 25 as essential to the story's mood. Gehen and Nafpliotis both enjoyed the Postal: Mark one shot, and Mazzacane called Postal: Laura one of the series' better issues.

== Collected editions ==
=== Trade paperbacks ===
Title	Volume #	Collected material	Release date	ISBN
Postal	1	Postal #1–4	June 2015	978-1632153425
Postal	2	Postal #5–8	December 2015	978-1632155924
Postal	3	Postal #9–12	June 2016	978-1632157102
Postal	4	Postal #13–16	December 2016	978-1534300255
Postal	5	Postal #17–20	June 2017	978-1534302167
Postal	6	Postal #21–24	January 2018	978-1534303485
Postal	7	Postal #25; Postal: Mark; Postal: Laura	August 2018	978-1534308039
Eden's Fall		Eden's Fall #1–3; Postal #1; The Tithe #1; Think Tank #1	January 2017	978-1534300651
Postal: Deliverance
Postal: Deliverance	1	Postal: Deliverance #1–4	November 2019	978-1534315167
Postal: Deliverance	2	Postal: Deliverance #5–8	July 2020	978-1534315679

=== Hardcovers ===
Book #	Collected material	Release date	ISBN
1	Postal #1–25; Postal: Mark; Postal: Laura	April 2020	978-1534315662

== Adaptation ==
A live action television adaptation of Postal from Matt Tolmach and Legendary Entertainment was in development in early 2016. The Walking Dead executive producer Seth Hoffman is writing the pilot script. After tough competition for the rights, it was picked up by Hulu in September 2016.
