= Evo =

EVO or Evo may refer to:

== Companies ==
- Evo (company), American sporting goods and outdoor recreation retailer headquartered in Seattle, Washington
- EVO Banco, a Spanish bank

== Games ==
- Evolution Championship Series, an annual fighting game esports tournament in the US
- Evo (board game), a 2001 board game
- E.V.O.: Search for Eden, a video game released for the Super NES in 1992

== People ==
- Bill Evo (born 1954), an American ice hockey player
- Evo Anton DeConcini (1901–1986), American jurist
- Evo Morales (born 1959), President of Bolivia from 2006–2019

== Places ==
- Evo, a village in Hämeenlinna, Finland

== Publications ==
- East Village Other, a 1965–1972 American underground newspaper in New York City
- EVO (comics), a 2002 comic crossover between Top Cow/Image Comics titles
- Evo (magazine), a British car magazine

== Technology ==
- Compaq Evo, a series of personal computers
- Enhanced VOB, a container digital video format
- EVO Smart Console, a PC and game console
- HTC Evo 4G, a smartphone
- Intel Evo
- EVO (release group), a movie release group
- Evo (AI), a generative AI for genomic sequences

== Transportation ==
- Evo Car Share, a carsharing service in the Greater Vancouver, British Columbia, Canada area
- Evo tube train, a train type being developed by London Underground in New Tube for London
- Mitsubishi Lancer Evolution, a car manufactured by Mitsubishi
- Hurricane 4 EVO, an upcoming version of the FCA Global Medium Engine from Stellantis
- Several models of Lamborghini Huracan

== Other uses ==
- Evo (guitar), the name of Steve Vai's primary instrument
- Evo (restaurant), a Michelin-starred restaurant in Barcelona, Spain
- E.V.O (album), a 2016 album by Brazilian metal band Almah
- a train in the London Underground rolling stock
- Exponentially Variegated Organism, fictional mutants in the Generator Rex series
- Extra-virgin olive oil
- Tide evo, a Tide (brand) laundry detergent

== Film ==
- Polis Evo, 2015 Malaysian action police film by Ghaz Abu Bakar
- Polis Evo 2, 2018 Malaysian action police film by Joel Soh and Andre Chiew
- Polis Evo 3, 2023 Malaysian action police film by Syafiq Yusof

== See also ==
- Evolution (disambiguation)
- Ivo, a masculine given name
