= EVO (comics) =

American crossover comic book storyline

EVO: Endgame
- EVO Endgame cover, art by Marc Silvestri.
- Date: July 2007
- Publisher: Top Cow/Image Comics

Creative team
- Writers: David Wohl (Witchblade); Michael Turner (Tomb Raider); Marc Silvestri/David Wohl (EVO)
- Artists: various

Original publication
- Published in: Witchblade; Tomb Raider; EVO
- Date of publication: February 2003
- Language: English
- ISBN: 1582407339

EVO: Endgame is an American crossover comic book storyline by Image Comics and Top Cow Productions featuring Witchblade and Lara Croft. It ran from September 2002 to February 2003.

== Publication history ==
The story appeared in the following order:

- Preludes: Witchblade #58-59 (by writer David Wohl, with pencils by Brian Ching, September–October 2002)
- Part One: Tomb Raider #25 (by writer Michael Turner, with pencils by Jonathan Sibal/Billy Tan, November 2002)
- Part Two: Witchblade #60 (by writer David Wohl, with pencils by Francis Manapul, November 2002)
- Part Three: EVO (by Marc Silvestri/David Wohl and Eric Basaldua/Marc Silvestri/Billy Tan, February 2003)
- Epilogue: Witchblade #61 (by writer David Wohl, with pencils by Romano Molenaar, February 2003)

== Collection ==
- Endgame (160 pages, July 2007, ISBN 1-58240-733-9)
