= Aphrodite IX =

- Cover of Aphrodite IX #1.

Publication information
- Publisher: Image Comics
- First appearance: Aphrodite IX #0 (April 2000)
- Created by: David Wohl (writer); David Finch

In-story information
- Abilities: Mechanized strength; Mechanized durability; Mechanized speed and agility; Self-repair; Markswoman skills; Integrated computer inside her body

Aphrodite IX is a superheroine created in 2000 by writer David Wohl and artist David Finch, published by the American comics studio Top Cow, an imprint of Image Comics. Aphrodite IX is a self-aware female android designed as a spy and assassin who retains no memory of her missions. A sequel series was launched in 2013, and the character was rebooted in the 2018 Cyber Force: Awakening series.

== Publication history ==
The first series of Aphrodite IX was written by David Wohl and drawn by comic book artist David Finch. Issue number #0 was released with an issue of Wizard magazine in April 2000. Originally appearing on the Top Cow solicitation schedule as a monthly title, to date only 6 issues and one trade paperback have ever been published. The 2000 publication year saw the release of issues #1 and 2. Before issue number #3 was released in early 2001, Finch was replaced with artist Clarence Lansang (the issue features artwork by both artists), yet only two more issues would be published during Lansang's tenure (number #1/2, a place-holder issue recapping previous story events and containing ten pages of "pin-ups" by various artists, and number #4 which continued the story but did not finish it).

A trade paperback, Aphrodite IX: Time Out of Mind, collecting all extant issues, was released in 2003.

=== Aphrodite IV ===
An android similar to Aphrodite IX, identified as Aphrodite IV, appeared in a page from Top Cow's ongoing series Cyberforce.

An Aphrodite is featured on the cover Witchblade #119, where she is shown wielding the Witchblade itself. The Aphrodite is confirmed to be IV, the same one stalking the Cyberforce. The cover, showing Aphrodite IV wielding the Witchblade, may seem a bit misleading, as she does not actually wear the Witchblade in this issue. During the Artifacts limited series, Aphrodite IV is hired by an unknown person who desires to bring all thirteen artifacts together.

=== Aphrodite IX ===
The 15th model of the Aphrodite series.

=== Vol. 2 ===
Top Cow released a free preview issue for Vol. 2 of Aphrodite IX on May 4, 2013, with the first new issue released in June and the 11th and final issue released in July 2014. The preview is set in the distant future of the previous issues in the series. The artist of the series is Stjepan Šejić.

== Plot ==
Aphrodite IX is a female android who has amnesia shortly after being sent on undercover missions. This leads to ongoing confusion about what she does and for whom. Although she becomes aware that she is intended as an assassin, she finds the idea increasingly distasteful and experiences dreams and desires like a human. This begins to undermine her morale but not her efficiency, for her conditioning takes over as her masters or survival circumstances require. When she seeks out clues to her past and true identity, she stumbles onto a conspiracy involving a secret society of cyborgs attempting to undermine the legitimate government.

== Main characters ==
Aphrodite IX – Aphrodite IX is a self-aware gynoid designed to carry out undercover missions of infiltration and assassination. Although she has been trained to kill, Aphrodite IX retains no memory of her actions; her brain is designed to experience an episode of amnesia at the end of each mission, apparently to protect her masters if not herself. The character's appearance is her trademark: Kelly green makeup and hair (including an oversized spot on one cheek), form-fitting outfits ringed with ammo belts, and thigh-high lug soled boots. She typically carries a very large knife on her belt and one or more large guns.

== In other media ==
An anime of Aphrodite IX was being developed, but aside from a trailer released at the Top Cow booth during the 2005 San Diego Comic-Con, nothing ever came of the project.

In 2009, Threshold Entertainment, Platinum Studios, and Top Cow announced plans to produce a 3D CGI feature film based on the comic but the project did not begin production.
