= A Voice in the Dark (comics) =

- Volume 1 cover artwork

Publication information
- Publisher: Top Cow Productions
- Publication date: November 2013 – 2014
- No. of issues: 9

Creative team
- Written by: Larime Taylor
- Artist: Larime Taylor
- Colorist: Sylv Taylor (cover artist)

A Voice in the Dark (originally titled Dark Zoey) is a comic book series that is written, drawn, toned, and lettered by Larime Taylor. It was first launched in November 2013 by Taylor, who funded the series via a successful Kickstarter campaign. Taylor, who was born with arthrogryposis and identifies as non-binary, draws the series by using their mouth, a brush, and a WACOM Cintiq tablet. Their wife Sylv, who was legally blind, served as the colorist for the individual issues and volume covers.

The first story arc was published by Top Cow Productions from November 2013 through May 2014 and was made up of 7 issues. Top Cow and Taylor announced the second arc, entitled A Voice in the Dark: Get Your Gun, in 2014. This began publication that same year but was cancelled by the publisher prior to the third issue.

== Synopsis ==
Zoey is a young woman who longs to murder others. She has killed once before, murdering the person who outed her best friend. The experience left Zoey with conflicting emotions when the bully gave a seemingly sincere apology for her actions. In order to contain her urges Zoey uses journaling as an outlet, destroying them afterwards in order to avoid detection. This outlet becomes less effective after Zoey begins attending a college in Blair, a town known for its history of murder.

She begins working as a disc jockey and talk show host for the college radio station, during which time she begins taking random calls to fill the time. She takes a call from a local girl named Heather who confessed to taking nude photographs of a passed out classmate, Trinna. Heather then shared the image, causing Trinna to attempt suicide. While Heather does try to partially justify herself, ultimately the guilt ate away at her and she is now suicidal herself. Zoey correctly assumes that Heather herself has been a victim of assault, which Heather confirms; she had been raped by a client her father was trying to sign to a record deal. Zoey is able to identify Heather with the help of her uncle Zeke, a crime scene investigator, however instead of preventing a suicide Heather then chooses to murder her parents. This leaves Zoey shaken, as her "inner killer" believes that she enjoyed overhearing the deaths.

During all of the prior events an unnamed serial killer has been targeting beautiful, wealthy young women, leaving behind Polaroids with their dead bodies. Zoey eventually breaks her vow to never kill again after learning that her roommate Mandy effectively set up Zoey and another woman, Krista, to get raped; Zoey was able to avoid her rapist due to another's intervention while Krista was not. As Zoey has experience in crime scene investigation due to her relationship with her uncle Zeke, she manages to murder Mandy and Brock without any problems. However unbeknownst to her, Zoey's actions were seen by the serial killer, who showed their appreciation by sending Zoey a Polaroid of the deceased Mandy.

== Characters ==
- Zoey: Zoey is a young, biracial college student that has to fight her urge to murder people. In issue 1 she begins attending Blair College, where she works with the college's radio station. She has a fairly good knowledge of crime scene investigation due to her relationship with her uncle Zeke. Zoey is unsure as to why she has the urge to kill people and has openly stated in the series that she has had a good upbringing, which she says is contrary to the popular assumption that murderers have led difficult lives. As of issue 6, the only living person aware of Zoey's true nature is the unnamed serial killer.
- Zeke: Zeke is Zoey's uncle and a crime scene investigator in California. He is shown to be openly gay and is investigating a series of murders committed by an as of yet unnamed serial killer. He has a close relationship with Zoey and is willing to talk about the recent deaths with his niece, as the two have a close relationship and Zoey has shown an interest in his job.
- Ash: Ash is one of Zoey's college roommates at Blair. She is goth, openly bisexual, and is studying to be a school teacher.
- Krista: Krista is a bubbly young woman and one of Zoey's college roommates. She is part of a local sorority. In later issues she invites Zoey and Ash to a party thrown by her sorority, where her sorority sister Mandy pressures her to entertain a boy that Mandy is interested in, which results in Krista being forced to perform oral sex on him.
- Mandy: Mandy is Krista's sorority sister and is shown to be snobby and mean-spirited, as she was openly rude to Ash and Zoey during the party and also told Krista to entertain a boy Mandy is interested in, saying to keep him there by any means necessary. She is killed by Zoey due to her actions and personality in issue #6.
- Brock: Brock is a student athlete at Blair and Mandy's boyfriend. He tries to rape Zoey at a party but is stopped by the intervention of a fellow party goer in a hockey mask. Zoey later kills him along with Mandy.
- Unnamed serial killer: The serial killer's identity and gender is currently not revealed in the series, but is implied to be the male party goer that stopped Brock's attempted rape of Zoey. In issue #6 he formally interacts with Zoey for the first time by sending her a Polaroid of Mandy's body with the message that s/he admired her work.

== Production ==
While first developing the idea for A Voice in the Dark (then titled Dark Zoey), Taylor intended for artist Duncan Eagleson to illustrate the series. This changed after Taylor realized that they would be unable to afford the price Eagleston charged per page and chose to draw the series himself. As they have arthrogryposis, Taylor is unable to draw the comic in conventional means and illustrates the series by way of a Wacom Cintiq tablet and a brush that they hold in their mouth. They arrange scenes and poses by taking reference pictures of several of their friends in various poses and scenarios, which they use to help with illustrations. Their wife Sylv, an artist and legally blind, works as a colorist for the series' issue covers. Taylor raised funds for the series via several successful Kickstarter campaigns.

A Voice in the Dark was originally planned as a spoof of the horror genre along the lines of the 1988 film Heathers and the character of Zoey was intended to be the series final girl, as the common trope for horror is that "the ethnic character always dies first". After some consideration, Taylor began developing Zoey as a female killer as they thought "what if she survives because she's the killer?". They also chose for Zoey to have a typical, non-abusive childhood and also decided against making her into a psychopath or sociopath, instead having Zoey feel emotions and have a conscience about her murders. Taylor has planned for the series to be ongoing and has written story arcs up to issue 13, with further issues to be made if there is enough reader demand.

== Reception ==
Critical reception for A Voice in the Dark has been predominantly positive and a reviewer for the Salt Lake City Weekly wrote that "A comic book this well-written and capably drawn is an achievement for any creator, but the tenacity required to launch a comic book you drew with a pencil between your teeth is nothing short of amazing." Reviewers for Ain't It Cool News and CraveOnline echoed similar sentiments, and Ain't It Cool News recommended the series highly. Comics Bulletin reviewed issue seven of the series and commented that

I don't think people realize what an important book A Voice In The Dark has grown to become in the space of just seven issues. It plays with taboos, from relatively tame consensual bondage kink, to the mix of violence and sexuality, to the depiction of female leads in fiction, to heteronormative stereotypes about the female figure and beauty, to just what the hell is going on in the minds of our Gen Y Millennials these days.
