= Evo (restaurant) =

Restaurant in Barcelona, Spain

Coordinates: 41.346°N 2.108°E

- Interactive map of Evo

Restaurant information
- Location: Barcelona, Spain

Evo is a Michelin starred restaurant in Barcelona, Spain.
