= Hunter-Killer (comics) =

Publication information
- Publisher: Top Cow Productions
- First appearance: Hunter-Killer #1 (March 2005)
- Created by: Marc Silvestri; Mark Waid

In-story information
- Member(s): Ellis; Samantha Argent; Cloaker; Damper; Wolf

Hunter-Killer is a comic book series from Top Cow Productions, Created by Mark Waid and Marc Silvestri. Silvestri provided the art for the first story arc while Eric Basaldua and Kenneth Rocafort drew the remaining issues. The series started in March 2005.

The protagonist of the story is a young man named Ellis. Other main characters are Wolf and Samantha Argent, some of the hunter-killers the title refers to.

== Fictional team history ==
During the Cold War, in response to the concern that a nuclear war would destroy the world, the United States government began a project to create living super-weapons. These beings were referred to as "Ultra Sapiens". However, there was a breakout, and most of the Ultra Sapiens went underground, hiding their gifts. Some went back to work for the government, tracking their rogue brethren and dealing with "situations" – they are the eponymous hunter-killers of the story.

Something else was also created by the project, capable of tracking and neutralising any Ultra Sapiens, anywhere. No one knows what it is, what it looks like, or where it is. A married couple in rural Montana might have some ideas, and their strangely gifted twenty-year-old son would be very surprised at the answer...

As they soon find out, their son is the long lost object created by the project that could track the other Ultra Sapiens, purposely named the catalog...
