= Tomb Raider (comics) =

Comic books based on the Tomb Raider video games

- Cover art for the first issue of the rebooted Tomb Raider comic series (2014)
- First appearance: Tomb Raider/Witchblade #1 (December 1997)

Publication information
- Publisher: Top Cow (1999–2005); Dark Horse Comics (2014–present)
- Formats: Original material for the series has been published as a set of ongoing series, limited series, and one-shot comics.
- Genre: Action/adventure
- Number of issues: 51 (plus #½)

Reprints
- Collected editions
- Tomb Raider Compendium: ISBN 1-58240-803-3

The Tomb Raider comic book series is based on the video game franchise Tomb Raider, currently produced by Crystal Dynamics (formerly by Core Design), which features the character of Lara Croft. The original series of comics, which were released between 1999 and 2005, was published by Top Cow and was primarily based on the games released by Core Design. In 2014, following the reboot of the Tomb Raider franchise, the series was revived and is currently being published by Dark Horse Comics. The new timeline of events is based upon the rebooted iteration of Lara Croft and her adventures.

== Publication history ==
The series, which ran from 1999 to 2005 (in which the fiftieth and final issue was released), consisted of monthly issues published by Top Cow Productions, who secured the rights to producing comics after a long struggle. Preceding this series, French publisher Glenat got the green light from Eidos France to produce a comic series called Dark Aeons based on the Tomb Raider games, which was taken off the market shortly after. Besides the monthly series, a parallel 12-part series called Journeys, which ran from 2001 to 2003, was also published.

The comics are primarily based on the same continuity as the games by Core Design, in which Lara's plane crashes when she is twenty-one years old (rather than the latter games by Crystal Dynamics, the plane crash happening when she was only nine years old), but the exact details are changed. In the comic, Lara is accompanied by both her parents and her fiancé, on the plane trip taken to celebrate her impending marriage (in the game series, Lara's plane is chartered to take on a skiing holiday). The fourth issue, released in April 2000, reveals that the family butler Hartford Compton is responsible for the death of Lara's parents, but they are alive and seen in Tomb Raider: Chronicles, released in November 2000.

Writers Dan Jurgens, John Nay Riber, and James Bonny worked on the series, which also featured the art of Andy Park, Michael Turner, Billy Tan, and Adam Hughes, amongst others.

There are one shots occasionally released and talk of the comic being reintroduced to tie into the Tomb Raider: Legend edited continuity. There have also been frequent crossovers with other Top Cow publications such as Fathom, The Darkness, Magdalena, and Witchblade. The debut issue of Tomb Raider was the number one-selling comic book of 1999.

In 2006, Top Cow released the Tomb Raider Compendium. This was a large, single-volume, collected edition of the Tomb Raider comic series; a hardcover version followed in 2008. The book encompasses all 50 issues (well over 1000 pages), as well as a cover gallery featuring select covers, most of them done by Adam Hughes. It is a full-size, full-color reproduction of all fifty issues on high-quality paper. This collection, however, does not include the various specials, minis, and one-shots from the series. This would probably explain why the compendium has "Volume One" written on the side.

Bandai Entertainment also published a "tankōbon" set of volumes, which reprints older stories in black-and-white in a smaller book.

Tomb Raider comics were announced to return in late 2007, but this was delayed due to licensing issues.

In 2014, Dark Horse Comics began publishing a new series of comics, set between the 2013 reboot and its sequel. Gail Simone wrote the first six issues, before collaborating with Rhianna Pratchett for the next arc. Pratchett took over for the rest of the series.

In 2016, another series started to bridge the gap between Rise of the Tomb Raider and the next game in the series, Shadow of the Tomb Raider.

In October 2026, Skybound published a crossover with the G.I. Joe: A Real American Hero comic book series.

== Publications ==
Primary series

- Tomb Raider, Starring Lara Croft vol. 1 (1999–2005) changed to Lara Croft, Tomb Raider with issue #25 in 2002 due to the release of the movie of the same name in 2001 was the first ongoing series featuring the character published by Top Cow Productions. It ran for 50 issues with Tomb Raider #0 and #1/2.
- Tomb Raider vol. 2 (2014–2015) was the second ongoing series published by Dark Horse Comics. It ran for 18 issues and was written by Gail Simone and Rhianna Pratchett.
- Tomb Raider vol. 3 (2016–2017) was the third ongoing series published by Dark Horse Comics. It ran for 12 issues and was written by Mariko Tamaki.

Limited series

- Tomb Raider, Starring Lara Croft: Journeys (2001–2003) 12-issue limited series; written by Fiona Kai Avery; penciled by Drew Johnson, Gerardo Sandoval, Drew Green, Carlos Mota, Manny Clark, and Mun Kao Tan; inks by Jay Leisten and Marlo Alquiza; colors by J.D. Smith, Tyson Wengler, and Brian Buccelato
- Lara Croft and the Frozen Omen (2015–2016) 5-issue limited series; written by Corinna Bechko, penciled by Randy Green
- Tomb Raider: Survivor's Crusade (2017) 4-issue limited series; written by Collin Kelly and Jackson Lanzing, penciled by Ashley A. Woods
- Tomb Raider: Inferno (2018) 4-issue limited series; written by Jackson Lanzing, penciled by PJ Holden
- Tomb Raider: Sacred Artifacts (2026) 4-issue limited series; written by Casey Gilly

One-shots

- Tomb Raider (Mean Machines Sega) (1996) by writer Vicky Arnold
- Tomb Raider/Witchblade (1997) by writer and penciler Michael Turner, inks by Joe Weems V, colors by J.D. Smith
- Witchblade/Tomb Raider (1998) by writer Michael Turner and Bill O'Neil, pencils by Michael Turner, inks by Joe Weems V, colors by J.D. Smith
- Tomb Raider: Dark Aeons (1999) by writer Alex Alice
- Witchblade/Tomb Raider #1/2 (2000) by writer Michael Turner and Bill O'Neil, pencils by Ken Cha, inks by Andy Owens, colors by Matt Nelson
- Tomb Raider: Origins (2000) by writer Dan Jurgens; pencils by Mark Pajarillo; inks by Danny Miki
- Tomb Raider/The Darkness Special (2001) by writer David Wohl, art by Billy Tan, colors by Steve Firchow
- Tomb Raider: Epiphany (2003) by writer Dan Jurgens; pencils by Darryl Banks; inks by Al Vey
- Tomb Raider: Scarface’s Treasure (2003) by writer Geoff Johns, art by Mark Texeira, colors by Beth Sotelo
- Tomb Raider: Takeover (2004) by writer James Bonny; pencils by Scott Benefiel; inks by Jasen Rodriguez
- Tomb Raider: Arabian Nights (2004) by writer Fiona Kai Avery; art by Billy Tan
- Tomb Raider: Sphere of Influence (2004) by writer Kevin McCarthy
- Tomb Raider: The Greatest Treasure of All (2005) by writer Dan Jurgens; art by Joe Jusko
- Tomb Raider: Cover Gallery (2006) featuring art of: Marc Silvestri, Adam Hughes, Michael Turner and more
- Tomb Raider: The Beginning (2013) by writer Rhianna Pratchett; pencils by Andrea Mutti and Nicolás Daniel Selma

== Collected editions ==
Tomb Raider Series Trades

#	Title	Material collected	Pages	Publication date	ISBN
Vol. 1
1	Saga of the Medusa Mask	Tomb Raider (1999–2005) #1-4	112	September 2000	978-1582401645
2a	The Merlin Stone	Tomb Raider (1999–2005) #5-10	136	April 2001	978-1840232608
2b	Mystic Artifacts	Tomb Raider (1999–2005) #5-10	136	April 2001	978-1582402024
3a	Lost Horizons	Tomb Raider (1999–2005) #11-14	96	October 2001	978-1840233766
3b	Chasing Shangri La	Tomb Raider (1999–2005) #11-15	128	September 2002	978-1582402673
4	Pieces of Zero	Tomb Raider (1999–2005) #16-17 and #19-20	96	August 2003	978-1840234022
	Tomb Raider/Witchblade: Trouble Seekers	Tomb Raider/Witchblade; Witchblade/Tomb Raider; Witchblade/Tomb Raider #1/2	80	January 2003	978-1582402796
Vol. 2
1	Season of the Witch	Tomb Raider (2014–2015) #1-6	152	November 19, 2014	978-1616554910
2	Secrets and Lies	Tomb Raider (2014–2015) #7-12	132	May 13, 2015	978-1616556396
3	Queen of Serpents	Tomb Raider (2014–2015) #13-18	144	November 11, 2015	978-1616558185
Vol. 3
1	Spore	Tomb Raider (2016–2017) #1-6	144	October 26, 2016	978-1506700106
2	Choice and Sacrifice	Tomb Raider (2016–2017) #7-12	144	May 10, 2017	978-1506701622
3	Survivor's Crusade	Tomb Raider: Survivor's Crusade (2017) #1-4	104	August 1, 2018	978-1506701936
4	Inferno	Tomb Raider: Inferno (2018) #1-4	104	January 9, 2019	978-1506705033

Tomb Raider Compendium Edition

#	Title	Material collected	Pages	Publication date	ISBN
1	Tomb Raider Compendium Edition	Tomb Raider (1999–2005) #1-50	1248	December 2006	978-1582406374

Tomb Raider Tankōbon

#	Title	Material collected	Pages	Publication date	ISBN
1	Tomb Raider Tankōbon 1	Tomb Raider (1999–2005) #1-10	236	May 2006	978-1594096662
2	Tomb Raider Tankōbon 2	Tomb Raider (1999–2005) #11-20	220	October 2006	978-1594096679
3	Tomb Raider Tankōbon 3	Tomb Raider (1999–2005) #21-30	220	February 2007	978-1594096686
4	Tomb Raider Tankōbon 4	Tomb Raider (1999–2005) #31-40	220	June 2007	978-1594096693
5	Tomb Raider Tankōbon 5	Tomb Raider (1999–2005) #41-50	220	November 2007	978-1594096709

Lara Croft

#	Title	Material collected	Pages	Publication date	ISBN
1	Lara Croft and the Frozen Omen	Lara Croft and the Frozen Omen #1-5	120	June 22, 2016	978-1616559571

Tomb Raider Archives

#	Title	Material collected	Pages	Publication date	ISBN
1	Tomb Raider Archives Book 1	Tomb Raider (1999–2005) #1-15	384	November 30, 2016	978-1506703329
2	Tomb Raider Archives Book 2	Tomb Raider (1999–2005) #16-24 and #26-34	480	June 14, 2017	978-1506703527
3	Tomb Raider Archives Book 3	Tomb Raider (1999–2005) #35-50	424	October 18, 2017	978-1506703534
4	Tomb Raider Archives Book 4	Tomb Raider (1999–2005) #0 and #1/2; Tomb Raider, Starring Lara Croft: Journeys #1-12; Tomb Raider: Origins; Tomb Raider: The Greatest Treasure of All; Tomb Raider: Epiphany; Tomb Raider: Takeover; Tomb Raider: Arabian Nights	496	March 21, 2018	978-1506703541

Tomb Raider Library Edition

#	Title	Material collected	Pages	Publication date	ISBN
1	Tomb Raider Library Edition 1	Tomb Raider (2014–2015) #1-18; Tomb Raider: The Beginning (2013)	496	February 28, 2018	978-1616559601

Tomb Raider Omnibus

#	Title	Material collected	Pages	Publication date	ISBN
1	Tomb Raider Omnibus Book 1	Tomb Raider (2014–2015) #1-18; Tomb Raider: The Beginning (2013)	472	July 24, 2019	978-1506714219
2	Tomb Raider Omnibus Book 2	Tomb Raider (2016–2017) #1-12; Tomb Raider: Survivor's Crusade (2017) #1-4; Tomb Raider: Inferno (2018) #1-4	472	January 1, 2020	978-1506714226

Tomb Raider Colossal Collection

#	Title	Material collected	Pages	Publication date	ISBN
1	Tomb Raider Colossal Collection Volume 1	Tomb Raider (1999–2005) #1-24 and #26-34	888	July 1, 2025	978-1506746074
2	Tomb Raider Colossal Collection Volume 2	Tomb Raider (1999–2005) #0, #1/2, and #35-50; Tomb Raider, Starring Lara Croft: Journeys #1-12; Tomb Raider: Origins; Tomb Raider: Epiphany; Tomb Raider: Takeover; Tomb Raider: Arabian Nights; Tomb Raider: The Greatest Treasure of All	944	November 25, 2025	978-1506746081
3	Tomb Raider Colossal Collection Volume 3	Tomb Raider: The Beginning (2013); Tomb Raider (2014–2015) #1-18; Tomb Raider (2016–2017) #1-12; Tomb Raider: Survivor's Crusade (2017) #1-4; Tomb Raider: Inferno (2018) #1-4; Lara Croft and the Frozen Omen #1-5	1144	April 28, 2026	978-1506746098
