= Cyblade =

- Cyblade from Cyberforce

Publication information
- Publisher: Top Cow Productions
- First appearance: Cyberforce #1 (Oct. 1992)
- Created by: Marc Silvestri

In-story information
- Alter ego: Dominique Thibaut
- Team affiliations: Cyberforce
- Abilities: Ability to generate "blades" of electromagnetic energy
Cyblade

Cyblade is the name of Image Universe superhero from Top Cow Productions. She is a member of Cyberforce.

== Publication history ==
After her initial appearances in other comics, Cyblade was one of two properties to win the first Pilot Season in 2007, meaning Cyblade would appear in her own eponymous mini-series. The one-shot was written by Joshua Hale Fialkov, with art by Rick Mays, and the creative team stayed together for the mini-series. The series ran for a total of four issues, from October 2008 to March 2009.

== Fictional character biography ==
Only fragments of Cyblade's past are known. Dominique Thiebaut was born in the fictional European country of Chalenne, supposedly somewhere near France. Her great-grandfather, Aubrey II, was the last king of Chalenne, and his only child was a daughter, Marie. Marie wed Col. Jean-Michel Thiebaut, who with Aubrey II's blessing became the first Prime Minister of the new democracy of Chalenne. The couple had two children, Alexander, who died of fever at age seven, and Patrick, Dominique's father. Patrick Thiebaut was less moral than his forebears, and more interested in money and power. He married a shy young woman named Claire, and the marriage was neither happy nor idyllic. She gave birth quickly, to a son whom they named Michel. Two years later, Claire died in childbirth with Dominique Aurore Marie Thiebaut.

In her early years, Dominique was spoiled and pampered. Her mutant powers manifested when she was attacked by gunmen at school. Many years later, her father and brother met with violent ends, which Dominique blames herself for not preventing. After their deaths, Dominique left Chalenne, and traveled the world as a freelancer. She studied to become a doctor, while simultaneously joining with freedom fighters in the Middle East. Eventually, she grew unhappy and ended both her role in the Middle Eastern conflicts and her studies to become a doctor. Eventually approached by Cyberdata, she joined them, and was transformed into the cyborg Cyblade. Her tenure as a Special Hazardous Operations Cyborg (SHOC) lasted until Dr. Corben, Heatwave, and Stryker left Cyberdata to form Cyberforce, which she joined as well. Dr. Corben revealed to her the atrocities she had committed while under the control of Cyberdata, which was done through a brain box. Being appalled at her past, she developed further trust in the doctor, allowing him to remove the device. She amassed a small personal fortune, both before and after her tenure as a SHOC.

=== Devil's Reign ===
During Heatwave's disappearance, Cyblade stepped up as leader, starting by organizing Cyberforce against an attack against a group of possessed teenagers. After they were dealt with, she found herself separated from her group and in the company of Elektra in Las Vegas. They travelled into the city intending to kill the 'Fire King' who was running the place for Mephisto. However, when she discovered this was actually Heatwave, she stopped Elektra and was captured as a result. She later succeeded in convincing Heatwave to turn against Mephisto.

=== Royal Blood ===
In Issue #34, Dominique's resurrected brother Michel informed her that their father had sold many of the people of Chalenne to Cyberdata, and that the corporation had not granted them powers, but merely enhanced and activated latent superhuman powers within each of the SHOCS.

=== Cyberforce/X-Men ===
It was further hinted that the Cyberforce characters were mutants or superhumans in the X-Men/Cyberforce one-shot comic, which united the two most glaringly similar pairs of characters in the X-Men/Cyberforce universes, Wolverine and Ripclaw, and Psylocke and Cyblade. The crossover introduces Ripclaw and Cyblade to two Marvel villain staples, The Hand ninjas and the Sentinels, and takes place in Japan. With the two members of Cyberforce captured by the Sentinels, a wandering Wolverine and Psylocke locate and free them. Both teams destroy the Sentinels.

=== Rising From the Ashes ===
With the relaunch of Cyberforce in 2006, Cyblade is again shown in her role as commander, though she steps down for the resurrected Heatwave.

== Powers and abilities ==
Cyblade has the mutant ability to create and manipulate electromagnetic energy from her fingers, where she can manipulate them in to varying functions such as blades. She can psionically control this power at any distance from herself, as long as the target is within her line of sight. Her only limitation is that the power dissipates as it travels through the air. Her blades generate heat up to 5000 °C, so they are able to cut through many materials. Cyblade has also had years of martial arts training, and she is adept at the disciplines of Aikido and Jeet Kun Do. Her powers can vary between controlled blades and projectile discharges, dependent on artistic discretion and license. She is also an expert swordswoman, martial artist, and tactician, owing to her upbringing.

== Bibliography ==
=== Solo series ===
- Cyblade #1-4 (October 2008 - March 2009)

=== Crossover series ===
- Cyblade/Shi one-shot (Jan 1995)
- Cyber Force Origins: Cyblade #1 (Jan 1995)
- Shi/Cyblade: The Battle for Independents (1995)
- Cyblade/Ghost Rider one-shot (Feb 1997)
- Elektra/Cyblade (1997)
