= Codename: Strykeforce =

Image Comics superhero team

Strykeforce

Publication information
- Publisher: Top Cow (Image Comics)
- First appearance: Cyberforce #4 (July 1993)
- Created by: Marc Silvestri; Brandon Peterson

In-story information
- Base(s): Death's Angel nuclear submarine
- Member(s): Stryker; Black Anvil; Killrazor; Tempest; Bloodbow; Icarus; Phade

Strykeforce is a team of mercenary superheroes created by comics creator Marc Silvestri and published by Top Cow, an imprint Image Comics. The comic series Codename: Strykeforce (also Codename: Stryke Force) was an offshoot of Cyberforce.

== Publication history ==
The comic series Codename: Strykeforce (January 1994 – August 1995) was an offshoot of Cyberforce, a comic series about a group of cyborg shock troops. The series lasted for fourteen issues. The first nine were written by David Wohl and Marc Silvestri and illustrated by Brandon Peterson, with the last five written by Steve Gerber and illustrated by Billy Tan. Fill-in artists included Joe Benitez in issue #8 and Michael Turner in issue #14. Issue #0 was published between #13 and 14 with story by Mike Heisler and art by Anthony Wynn. Gerber and Tan also handled the two-part Cyberforce/Codename: Strykeforce crossover.

The comic was relaunched in 2004 as Strykeforce, lasting for 5 issues. The relaunch was written by Jay Faerber and illustrated by Tyler Kirkham.

== Fictional history ==
=== Issue #0 ===
When a mission comes along that Cyberforce will not touch, Stryker (Colonel Morgan Striker) puts together his team to take care of business. Team members include Stryker, a cyborg with three detachable cybernetic arms on his right side, Phade, a mutant with the ability to alter his molecular density, Black Anvil (often referred to simply as Anvil), a short cobalt blue powerhouse with incredible strength, Bloodbow, an expert marksman, and Icarus, a man with hollow bones possessing the power of flight. The mission turns out to be a set-up, and Phade disappears after using his powers for too long, causing his molecules to drift apart. The team discover that one of their opponents has also been deceived and she joins the team as Tempest, a woman with the power to control the weather. Between issues #0 and #1, Anvil is sent to the Himalayan Mountains to recruit Killrazor, a martial arts expert who can create knives from any portion of his body.

=== Death's Angel ===
Stryker and Icarus are sent to Ukraine to protect President Bill Clinton during a peace conference. The proceedings are attacked and Stryker protects the president but Icarus is killed. Several other dignitaries are abducted by a villain who called himself Death's Angel, and Strykeforce tracks him to his nuclear submarine. While fighting aboard the sub, the team narrowly prevents a nuclear missile strike on New York. Instead of payment for the mission, Strykeforce takes the sub as their new base of operations.

=== Stormwatch ===
Stryker and his team are tasked with a high-stakes mission to locate and capture an extraterrestrial capable of replicating human beings with alarming precision. With the help of Weatherman One Henry Bendix, they navigate the complex terrain of Skywatch in pursuit of this elusive and potentially dangerous entity. The alien duplicates Anvil and begins to stir up trouble between Strykeforce and Stormwatch, the super team that lives on the space station. The alien is eventually uncovered and fought by both teams. After the encounter, however, the alien accidentally kills Bloodbow and decides to take his form and replace him as a member of Strykeforce. For the remainder of the series (issues #8-14), Bloodbow is the female, alien shapeshifter Sh'rrrnn.

=== Scavengers ===
Stryker accepts a mission from Joshua Thornewood to find a Fountain of Youth hidden in the Himalayas and protected by a Yeti. Joshua's twin brother Jacob hires a rival team, the Scavengers, to accomplish the same mission. The leader of the Scavengers, Rancor Deathstrike, is an old rival of Stryker's.

=== The Industrial Accidents ===
In dire financial straits, Stryker splits the Strykeforce into two teams to take on dual missions to make more money. Both missions turn out to be a setup masterminded by a U.S. senator. Stryker, angry at the deception, demands payment. In retaliation, the senator hires a villainous group called the Industrial Accidents to take down Strykeforce. During the ensuing conflict, Stryker is captured by the Accidents and is then rescued by his old team, Cyberforce. Bloodbow is "killed" and transforms back into the more powerful alien form of Sh'rrrnn to continue the fight. With the fate of both Stryker and Bloodbow unknown, the rest of the team heads back to the sub to wait for news.

=== Opposing forces ===
Bloodbow returns to Strykeforce and finally reveals to the team that he is a shapeshifting alien. Strykeforce and Cyberforce team up to repel an invasion by Sh'rrrnn's people, the Shu'roch. After the adventure, Stryker announces that the team was a mistake from the start and disbands the Strykeforce.
