= Cyber Force (comics) =

Comic book series

- First issue cover

Publication information
- Publisher: Top Cow Productions (Image Comics)
- Publication date: Cyber Force #1 (Oct. 1992)
- No. of issues: List: (vol. 1): 4 (vol. 2): 36 (vol. 3): 6 (vol. 4): 11 (vol. 5): 11
- Main characters: Ballistic; Cyblade; Heatwave; Impact; Ripclaw; Stryker; Velocity

Creative team
- Written by: Eric Silvestri
- Artist: Marc Silvestri

Cyber Force (also Cyberforce) is a comic book series created by Marc Silvestri in 1992 through his publishing studio, Top Cow Productions, and published by Image Comics.

== Publication history ==
=== Volume 1 ===
Cyber Force was first published as a mini-series in October 1992 by Image Comics in association with Malibu Comics. Created by and illustrated by Marc Silvestri, the series was written by his brother, Eric Silvestri: "When the guys at Image and I were starting out, we weren't really sure what the reaction would be to our characters. So, just to play it safe, we decided to put out our projects as mini-series to test out the public reaction".

The first story titled "Tin Men of War", follows Carin Taylor, a mutant otherwise known as Velocity as she attempts to escape the forces of Cyberdata, a corrupt mega-corporation. Her attempts to evade Cyberdata's task force, led by her sister, Cassandra Taylor a.k.a. "Ballistic" bring her into contact with the Cyber Force, a group of cybernetically enhanced mutant escapees from Cyberdata, consisting of Stryker, Cyblade, Heatwave, Impact and Ripclaw. After Velocity is rescued, the team explains to her that they were created by Cyberdata to enhance their mutant abilities, turning them into super-soldiers known as S.H.O.C.s (Special Hazardous Operation Cyborgs), but they escaped and formed Cyber Force, making it their mission to bring down Cyberdata for good.

=== Volume 2 ===
After high sales for the mini-series, an ongoing series was launched in October 1993 with the Cyber Force #0 one-shot, which contained a script and art by Walter Simonson based on a plot by Marc and Eric Silvestri. The new monthly series was published by Image through Silvestri's Top Cow Productions beginning in November 1993, running 35 issues. The series crossed over with Wild C.A.T.s for the "Killer Instinct" storyline spanning Wild C.A.T.S #5-7 and Cyber Force vol. 2 #1-3.

Silvestri later turned his duties over to other artists, including David Finch. The original comic book focused on a team of mutants who were captured by Cyberdata, an enormous corporation planning to take over the world. The mutants were experimented on and had their abilities enhanced with cybernetic implants in hopes of making them S.H.O.C.s (Special Hazardous Operations Cyborgs). The mutants subsequently escaped and banded together as Cyber Force, determined to defeat Cyberdata.

=== Volume 3 ===
The series was revived in a third volume in 2006 (April-September) as a six-issue limited series written by Ron Marz and drawn by Pat Lee titled Rising From the Ashes. This series continues with Ripclaw and Velocity's travel to Antarctica to find a cure against a doomsday virus, which was created as a failsafe by Cyberdata to destroy all mutants. Along with dealing with the virus and greedy sailors, Velocity uncovers the true origin of Cyberdata while being brought to a long-crashed sentient alien ship inside a frozen cave. It is revealed here that Cyberdata was created by an Antarctic explorer by the name of Emil Zadrock, whose mind became corrupted by 1,000-year-old living machinery that he found in the cave over 100 years ago. The process of creating mutants was done by combining human beings with alien DNA. The heroes eventually engage in a confrontation with the ancient alien race that created the living machinery and the crashed sentient spaceship. The team was given an updated look, a new base of operations, and changes to its roster. Important subplots include the death and resurrection of Ripclaw, Stryker being away from the action, Impact wanting to leave the team, and a growing romantic relationship between Ripclaw and Velocity. The story also ties into the JLA/Cyberforce crossover that takes place between issues #0 and #1 of volume 3.

=== Volume 4 ===
Top Cow debuted the fourth volume of the series in October 2012. This was a rebooted Cyber Force as part of the company's "Top Cow Rebirth" initiative. Funded through a Kickstarter campaign, the first five issues were released for free. Silvestri provided cyberpunk-influenced art for the rebooted series, while Khoi Pham was brought aboard as illustrator after five years of exclusive work for Marvel Comics. The first issue received a positive review from Benjamin Bailey of IGN, who described the post-apocalyptic setting as both interesting and genuine. Commenting on Pham's art, he cited some inconsistencies, particularly with respect to renderings of technology.

=== Volume 5 ===
The fifth volume of the series was announced as a 2015 digital-only series written by Matt Hawkins, released on the webcomic service Webtoon. It was eventually launched as a printed comic series by Image in 2018.

== In other media ==
A six episode half-hour Cyber Force animated miniseries was planned for the 1995–96 season on Fox Kids as part of an hour-long block that would also have featured a Youngblood series. Although completed character designs and a model sheet were featured in magazines, the series never progressed past the planning stage. In March 1995, it was reported that the Cyber Force animated miniseries was being positioned as a mid-season replacement for the 1996–97 television schedule. The series was to have been produced by Graz Entertainment and would've used a combination of traditional animation integrated with computer animation. By August 1996, the animated Cyber Force series was still in "active development", but had since moved under DreamWorks Television. By September 1997, it was confirmed that the series was dead.

20th Century Fox had optioned the rights to Cyber Force around the same as the proposed animated series as a possible feature film.

== Bibliography ==
=== Series ===
- Cyberforce Volume 1, #0–4 (October 1992 – September 1993)
- Cyberforce Volume 2, #1–35 (November 1993 – September 1997)
- Cyberforce Volume 3, #0–6 (April 2006 – October 2006)
- Cyberforce Volume 4, #1-11 (October 2012 – February 2015)
- Cyberforce Volume 5, #1-11 (March 2018 – July 2019)

=== Collected editions ===
- Cyberforce: The Tin Men of War (collects Cyberforce Vol. 1 #1–4)
- Cyber Force: Origins Volume 1 (collects Cyberforce Vol. 1 #1–4, #0, and Cyberforce Annual #1)
- Cyber Force: Origins Volume 2 (collects Cyberforce Vol. 2 #1–8, and Cyberforce Origins #1 – Cyblade)
- Cyber Force: Origins Volume 3 (collects Cyberforce Vol. 2 #9–16, and Cyberforce Origins #2 – Stryker)
- Wildcats/Cyberforce: Killer Instinct (collects WildC.A.T.S. Covert Action Teams #5–7 and Cyberforce Vol. 2 #1–3)
- Cyberforce: Assault with a Deadly Woman (collects Cyberforce Vol. 2 #4–7)
- Cyberforce-Hunter/Killer (Collects Cyberforce-Hunter/Killer #1-5)
- Cyber Force: Origins Volume 4 (collects Cyberforce Vol. 2 #17–25)
- Cyberforce: Rising from the Ashes (collects Cyberforce Vol. 3 #1–6, #0)
- Cyberforce: Rebirth Volume 1 (collects Cyberforce Vol. 4 #1–5)
- Cyberforce: Rebirth Volume 2 (collects Cyberforce Vol. 4 #6–10)
- Cyberforce: Rebirth Volume 3 (collects Cyberforce Webtoons Comic + Cyber Force: Artifacts #0)
- Cyberforce: Rebirth Volume 4 (collects Cyberforce Webtoons Comic)
- Cyberforce: Awakening Volume 1 (collects Cyberforce reboot #1-4)
- Cyberforce: Awakening Volume 2 (collects Cyberforce reboot #5-8)
- Cyberforce: Awakening Volume 3 (collects Cyberforce reboot #9-11)
