= Marc Silvestri =

American comic book creator

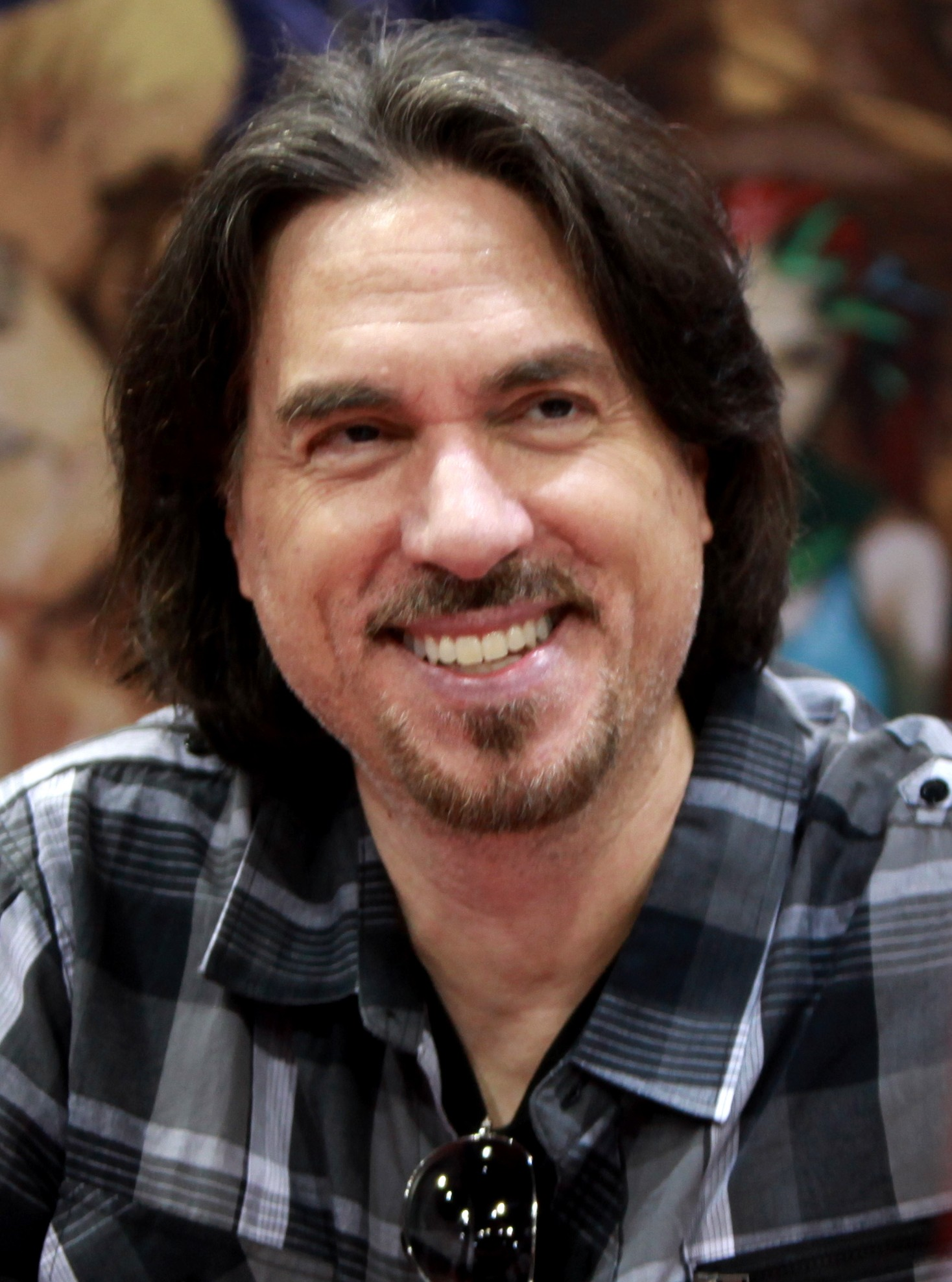
- Silvestri in 2014
- Born: March 29, 1958 (age 68) Palm Beach, Florida, U.S.
- Areas: Writer, artist, publisher
- Notable works: Cyberforce; The Darkness; Uncanny X-Men; Strykeforce; Witchblade; Wolverine

Marc Silvestri (born March 29, 1958) is an American comic book artist, creator and publisher. He is CEO of Top Cow Productions and Image Comics.

== Early life ==
Marc Silvestri was born on March 29, 1958, in Palm Beach, Florida. Silvestri first discovered comics through his cousin, who was an avid collector. It was during visits to his cousin's house that Silvestri would become familiar with artists such as Jack Kirby, Bernie Wrightson, and John Buscema. Silvestri names Wrightson, Buscema, and Frank Frazetta as his biggest influences.

== Career ==
Silvestri began his career drawing issues for DC Comics and First Comics. He joined Marvel Comics in the mid-1980s (having earlier guest pencilled for Marvel as early as 1982 on Master of Kung Fu issue 119), and became the penciller on Uncanny X-Men from 1987 to 1990. He subsequently spent two years pencilling its spin-off title Wolverine. Larry Hama, who wrote the series throughout those two years, later said of working with Silvestri, "It was like magic. I would hand in a script and his visualization of it was always better than what I saw. He would expand on the ideas. He's just a brilliant draftsman and storyteller, and I was really lucky to get to work with him."

In 1992, Silvestri became one of the original seven artists (along with Jim Lee, Whilce Portacio, Rob Liefeld, Erik Larsen, Todd McFarlane, and Jim Valentino) to form the breakaway comics company Image Comics. Silvestri's stable of titles was published under the imprint Top Cow with the first title released being Cyberforce. Besides his art, Silvestri was also scripter (and co-plotter) on the Top Cow title Codename: Stryke Force. Many of Silvestri's stories were scripted by his brother, Eric Silvestri.

Disputes among the Image partners led to Silvestri briefly leaving the publisher in 1996, but he returned after Liefeld severed his own ties with Image.

Top Cow's successes include the titles Witchblade, The Darkness, Inferno Hellbound (publication of which was interrupted for unknown reasons), and Fathom.

Silvestri produced the story and preliminary character sketches for the 1997 video game Fighting Force.

In 2004, Silvestri made a brief return to Marvel to pencil several issues of X-Men, collaborating with writer Grant Morrison. Later in the year, he launched a new Top Cow title, Hunter-Killer with writer Mark Waid. He provided covers for the Marvel Comics mini-series, X-Men: Deadly Genesis by Ed Brubaker and Trevor Hairsine.

In June 2006, Top Cow released Cyberforce #0 featuring art by Silvestri.

In late 2007 (cover date December), he pencilled the X-Men: Messiah Complex one-shot, as well as many covers in the crossover of the same name that followed.

Silvestri executive produced the anime adaptation of Witchblade.

He continued his work on X-Men, penciling the first installment, in the form of the Uncanny X-Men/Dark Avengers one-shot crossover Utopia in 2009. That same year, he contributed to the crossover miniseries Image United, penciling all the characters he created during his run at Image that featured in the story.

In 2012, Silvestri was one of several artists to illustrate a variant cover for Robert Kirkman's The Walking Dead #100, which was released July 11 at San Diego Comic-Con.

In November 2022, DC Comics published the limited series Batman & The Joker: The Deadly Duo, written and drawn by Silvestri.

== Personal life ==
Silvestri is married to Bridget Silvestri.

== Bibliography ==
EVO: Endgame cover by Marc Silvestri

=== DC ===
- Batman & The Joker: The Deadly Duo #1-7 (2022-2023)
- Batman Black and White #3 (1996)
- Ghosts #104 (1981)
- House of Mystery #292 (1981)
- The Unexpected #222 (1982)
- Weird War Tales #113 (1982)

=== Image/TopCow ===
- 21 #3 (along with Billy Tan) (1996)
- Cyberforce #1–4 (miniseries, also referred as vol. 1) (1992)
- Cyberforce, regular series, #1–7, 9–13, 18 (1993–95)
- Cyberforce Ashcan, one-shot
- Cyblade/Shi: The Battle for Independents #1 (1995)
- Darkness #1–7, 9–12 (1996–97); #75 (2009)
- EVO: Endgame #1
- Hunter-Killer #0–6 (2005–06)
- Image United #1–3 (2009–10)
- Spawn #25 (1994) (Cover Art)
- Codename: Stryke Force
- "September Mourning"

=== Marvel ===
- Civil War: The Initiative, one-shot (2007)
- Cloak and Dagger #7 (1986)
- King Conan #13–16, 19–29 (1982–85)
- Dark Avengers/Uncanny X-Men: Utopia #1, one-shot (2009)
- Incredible Hulk, vol. 3, #1–3 (2011)
- Marvel Graphic Novel #17: Revenge of the Living Monolith (1985)
- Master of Kung Fu #119 (1982)
- Star Trek/X-Men, one-shot (among other artists) (1996)
- New X-Men #151–154 (2004)
- Uncanny X-Men #218, 220–222, 224–227, 229, 230, 232–234, 236, 238–244, 246, 247, 249–251, 253–255, 259–261 (1987–90)
- What If? (Sub-Mariner) #41 (1983)
- Web of Spider-Man #16–20, 22 (1986–87)
- Wolverine #31–43, 45, 46, 48–50, 52, 53, 55–57 (1990–92)
- X-Factor #8, 12, 54 (1986–90)
- X-Men: Messiah Complex one-shot (2007)
- X-Men vs. Avengers #1-3 (1987)

=== Other publishers ===
- Warp Special #2 (First Comics, 1984)

== Notes ==
Preceded by John Romita, Jr.	Uncanny X-Men artist 1987–1990	Succeeded by Jim Lee
