= Top Cow Productions =

American comics publisher

- Parent company: Image Comics
- Founded: 1992
- Founder: Marc Silvestri
- Country of origin: United States
- Headquarters location: Los Angeles
- Key people: Marc Silvestri; Matt Hawkins
- Fiction genres: Superhero fiction, science fiction, horror fiction
- Official website: topcow.com

Top Cow Productions is an American comics publisher, an imprint of Image Comics. It was founded by Marc Silvestri in 1992. The company is known for publishing titles such as Cyberforce, The Darkness, Sunstone, Wanted, and Witchblade. It was the original publisher of Michael Turner's Fathom and published the first Tomb Raider comics.

== History ==
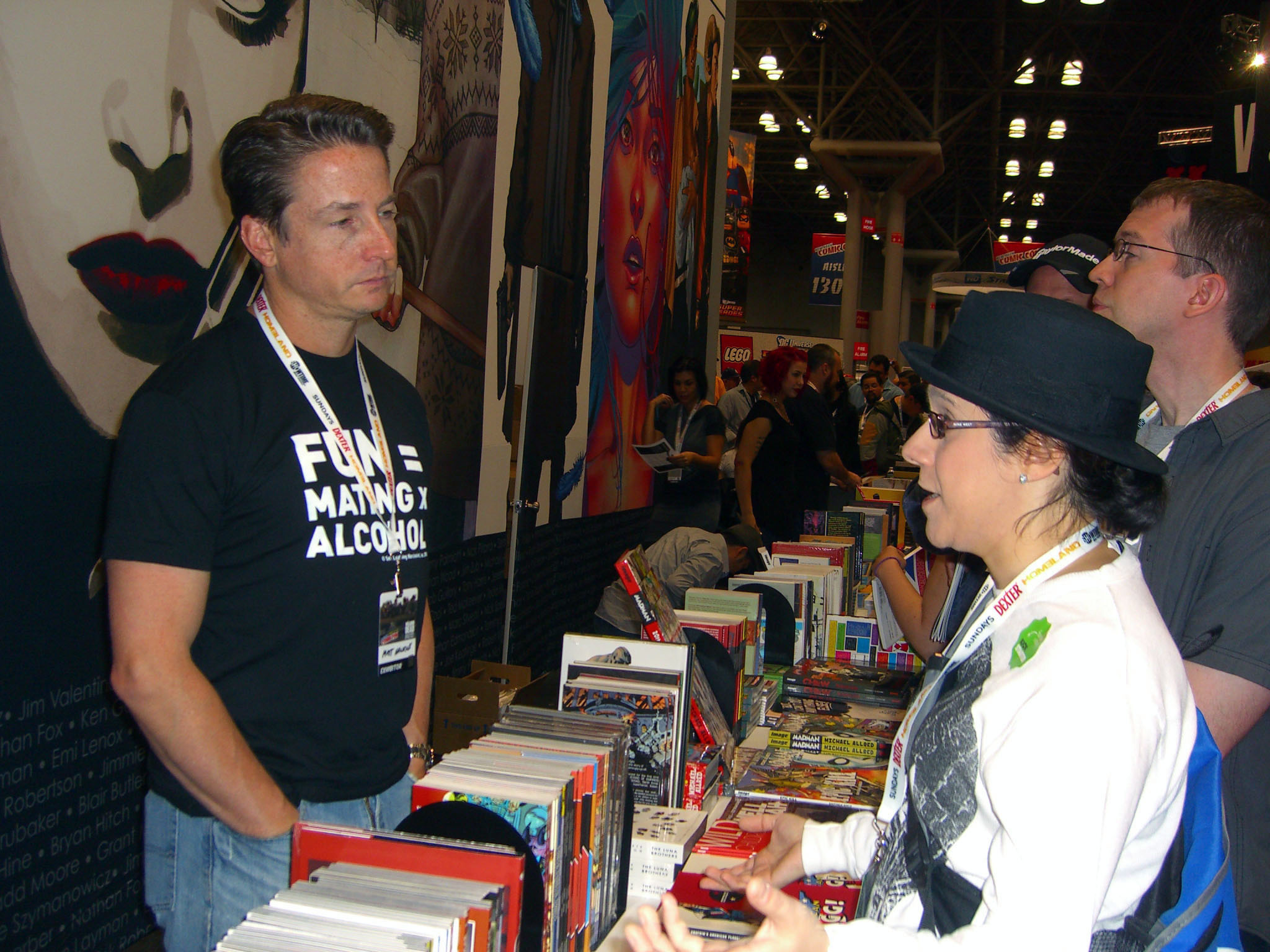
Top Cow President Matt Hawkins (left) speaking with fans (right) at the Image Comics booth at the 2012 New York Comic Con.

=== 1990s ===
Marc Silvestri was one of the original seven founders of Image Comics, along with Erik Larsen, Rob Liefeld, Jim Lee, Todd McFarlane, Jim Valentino, and Whilce Portacio. When Image Comics first launched in 1992, Silvestri was still part of the Homage Studios group which at the time he co-owned with Lee, Joe Chiodo, Portacio, and Scott Williams. Silvestri's first title for Image Comics was Cyberforce. By the time the second issue was released in March 1993 Silvestri was publishing under the Top Cow Productions name.

Silvestri says that naming his company "Top Cow" was a drunken decision. He was about to change the name to "Ballistic Studios," but changed his mind when he saw the Top Cow logo.

Silvestri began expanding his line with Cyberforce spin-off called Codename: Strykeforce in 1994, which became the third top selling comic book of the year. He left Homage Studios in 1994 to move to Los Angeles to be closer to Hollywood and to better distinguish his publishing efforts from Lee's.

Following the move, Top Cow expanded its line of titles and its pool of talent. Chris Claremont wrote Cyberforce issues 9 through 11, published between December 1994 and April 1995. Also in 1995, Top Cow published a Velocity mini-series written by Kurt Busiek, a Weapon Zero mini-series written by Walt Simonson, and Steve Gerber took over writing chores on Codename: Strykeforce starting with issue 10.

Top Cow published the first issue of Witchblade, written by David Wohl, Brian Haberlin, and Christina Z, with art by Michael Turner, in 1995. The character first appeared in the Cyblade/Shi The Battle for Independents one-shot, a crossover between a character from Cyberforce and Billy Tucci's creator owned series Shi. Witchblade was co-created by Silvestri, Wohl, Haberlin, Z, and Turner in part as a response to the success of Shi other series with strong women lead characters. The series would later spawn a live action television series in 2001 and an animated series in 2006 (See Media adaptations below).

A Witchblade spin-off series, The Darkness, followed in 1996, written by Garth Ennis with art by David Finch. The new title's sales started strong and only grew stronger, despite the comics market downturn, with its eleventh issue becoming the top selling comic book of 1997. Top Cow president Matt Hawkins later called Witchblade and The Darkness the company's flagship titles and described the period following their debut as Top Cow's "second era."

In 1996, Top Cow briefly parted ways with Image during a dispute with Image associate Rob Liefeld. Liefeld left the company shortly after Top Cow's departure, and Top Cow returned to the partnership.

The first issue of Turner's creator owned series Fathom became the top selling comic book of 1998. Fathom later moved to Turner's own publishing company Aspen. J. Michael Straczynski, best known then for his television series Babylon 5 brought his creator-owned comic book series Rising Stars to Top Cow in 1999, followed by Midnight Nation in 2000. Hawins called the period during which the company focused on "third-party" projects like Rising Stars and Midnight Nation the company's third era.

Top Cow started publishing Tomb Raider comics in 1999, following an investment deal with Eidos Games. The first issue of the series was the top selling comic book of 1999.

=== 2000s ===
Top Cow published Wanted by Mark Millar and JG Jones in 2003. The first printing of the first issue sold out quickly. The comic was adapted into a film of the same name in 2008.

Ron Marz began writing Witchblade with issue 80 in 2004. Stjepan Šejić joined the series as regular artist with issue 116 in 2008 and Top Cow announced that the pair would be the creative team through issue 150, published in 2011. Hawkins described Top Cow's refocusing on company-owned characters around this time as the beginning of the company's fourth era.

In the mid-2000s, an Aphrodite IX anime adaptation was announced and briefly developed, with a promo trailer shown at events such as the 2005 San Diego Comic-Con alongside Witchblade's anime trailer. The animation studio attached to the project was Madhouse. Despite the initial promotional efforts, nothing beyond the trailer emerged. Later report that after the early 2005 teaser, there was minimal apparent activity, and no episodes, broadcast details, or production updates were released. The anime effectively entered development limbo, and the project never progressed to production to distribution, making it classified as cancelled in practice.

In 2006, Top Cow made a business agreement with Marvel Comics to publish crossovers such as Darkness/Wolverine and Witchblade/Punisher. As part of this agreement, several Top Cow artists also provided art chores on various Marvel series. Tyler Kirkham worked on Phoenix: Warsong and New Avengers/Transformers; Mike Choi worked on X-23: Target X; and Silvestri himself worked on X-Men: Messiah Complex. At the 2007 San Diego Comic-Con, an announcement was made by Marvel Comics extending the deal into 2008.

Top Cow's "Pilot Season" initiative began in 2007. Readers were able to vote on the future of six one-shot pilot comics released throughout the year.

At the 2007 New York Comic Con Top Cow announced that they would be one of the first major comics publishers to offer online distribution, through a partnership with IGN. The initial titles offered included Tomb Raider, The Darkness, and Witchblade, at $1.99 per issue. They also announced a deal with Zannel to license their comics as mobile comics.

=== 2010s ===
In an effort to make their titles more accessible to new readers, Top Cow rebooted the continuity of its comic book line in 2012 in an event called "Rebirth." The company's flagship titles, The Darkness and Witchblade, relaunched with new creative teams as part of the reboot.

Top Cow held its first annual talent hunt in 2012. The program seeks to recruit artists and writers who have never been published by a major comics publisher before. Past winners and runners-up include Isaac Goodhart, Tini Howard, and Stephanie Phillips.

Top Cow published the first collection of Šejić's romance/erotica webcomic Sunstone in 2014. The title's success led Top Cow to publish more erotica, romance, and slice of life comics, including Swing, written by Matt Hawkins and Jenni Cheung with art by Linda Šejić, and Sugar, written by Hawkins and Cheung with art by Yishan Li.

The original Witchblade series ended with issue 185 in 2015. The series was relaunched in December 2017, written by Caitlin Kittredge with art by Roberta Ingranata. It was the first time Witchblade was both written and drawn by women. The series was followed a new Cyber Force series in March, 2018 and the Aphrodite V series in July 2018. A new The Darkness series was also announced for 2019, but never published.

=== 2020s ===
In 2022, Top Cow Productions reprinted the early issues of Cyberforce for the first time since 1994 in a 30th anniversary commemorative hardcover edition funded through Kickstarter and exclusively available through the platform. Later in the same year the book was reprinted in a trade paperback with the same contents.

In 2024, the company began publishing a new Witchblade series being a reboot written by Marguerite Bennett and drawn by Giuseppe Cafaro.

In 2025, a new The Darkness title, written by original co-creator Marc Silvestri, was launched being tie-in to the 2024 Witchblade reboot sharing universe as well as presenting intertwined plot elements between them.

== Media adaptations ==
=== The Darkness ===
==== Film ====
In December 2004, Dimension Films paid an undisclosed six-figure sum to develop a movie based on the comic, possibly for release in 2008. The film was pitched as a movie similar to The Crow, which was also produced by Dimension. There have been no further developments.

==== Video games ====
In March 2005, The Darkness was licensed by Majesco for a console game to be developed by Starbreeze Studios. 2K Games later obtained the rights to the game, and a first-person shooter adaptation was released for the Xbox 360 and PlayStation 3 console systems on June 25, 2007, in the United States. In the EU, the game was released for Xbox 360 on June 29, 2007, and for PS3 on July 20 of the same year.

To promote the video game, a five-issue mini-series was released, with each issue chronicled a chapter of the game. In June 2007, the mini-series was collected into a trade paperback.

In February 2012, a sequel to the video game, entitled The Darkness II, was released for PC, Xbox 360 and PlayStation 3. The script for the game was written by comic book writer Paul Jenkins, who previously worked on The Darkness comic series. Unlike the first game, the graphics for The Darkness II were developed using a cel-shading technique, emulating the aesthetic of its graphic novel namesake. The game received positive reviews from critics.

=== Witchblade ===
==== Television series ====
Following a pilot film in August 2000, the cable network TNT premiered a television series based on the comic book series in 2001. The series was directed by Ralph Hemecker and written by Marc Silvestri and J.D. Zeik. Yancy Butler starred as Sara Pezzini. Although critically acclaimed and popular with audiences, it was canceled in September 2002. The cancellation was announced as a production decision, but there was widespread speculation that the true reason for its cancellation was Butler's alcohol addiction; Butler was ordered to enter rehab for alcohol addiction a year later, after being arrested for wandering intoxicated amidst traffic.

Witchblade ran for two 12–episode seasons on TNT. The first episode aired on June 12, 2001, and the last episode aired on August 26, 2002. On April 1, 2008, Warner Home Video announced a long-anticipated DVD release. Witchblade: The Complete Series — a seven-disc collectors set including the original made-for-TV movie, all 23 episodes of the series, and special features — was released July 29, 2008.

==== Reboot ====
In January 2017, NBC announced that it would be developing a Witchblade reboot, with Carol Mendelsohn and Caroline Dries serving as executive producers.

==== Film adaptation ====
An American superhero film based on the series was announced in 2008. The film was to be directed by Michael Rymer, who directed the 2002 film Queen of the Damned and several episodes of Battlestar Galactica, and was to be written by Everett De Roche.

The film was one of the two being produced and financed back-to-back by Platinum Studios, IDG Films and Relativity Media. The film was to be produced by Arclight's Gary Hamilton and Nigel Odell, Platinum Studios' Scott Mitchell Rosenberg, and Steve Squillante of Havenwood Media. Top Cow's Marc Silvestri and Matt Hawkins were to be executive producers with Platinum Studios' Rich Marincic and Greenberg Group's Randy Greenberg. Filming was announced to begin in September 2008, with China and Australia among the possible locations being considered for filming.

The film's website and teaser poster were released in May 2008 promising a 2009 release, but as of 2021 it has yet to be filmed.

==== Anime series ====
In 2004 Japanese animation studio GONZO announced an anime version of Witchblade, with a subsequent manga adaptation and a Japanese-only novel. Although this series centers around all new characters and tells a new story not contained in the source material, it is set in the same continuity as the comic book. The anime series began broadcast during April 2006 and ran for 24 episodes.

== See also ==
- Semic Comics
