= Thunder Levin =

American screenwriter and director

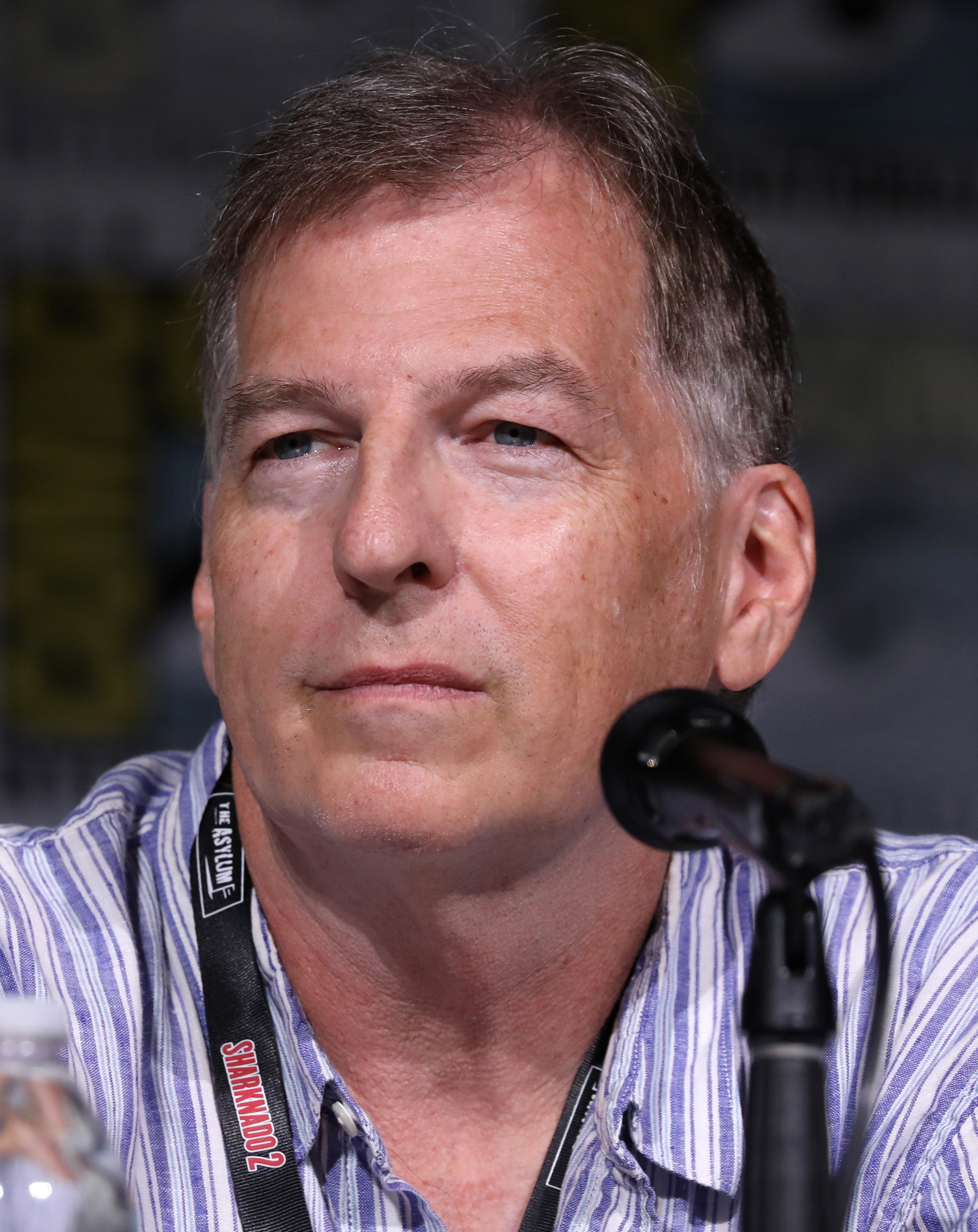
- Born: Thunder Levin; New York City, New York, U.S.
- Education: New York University
- Occupations: Screenwriter; director
- Known for: Sharknado

Thunder Levin is an American screenwriter and director, known for writing the first four Sharknado television films. Levin's work was largely responsible for the resurgence of sharksploitation films.

== Early life and education ==
Levin was born and raised in New York City. His father, Michael, was an award-winning journalist, while his mother, Glenis, was an immigrant from Liverpool, England.

He graduated from Hunter College High School, and received a Bachelor of Fine Arts degree in film from New York University.

== Career ==
=== Early career ===
Levin moved to Los Angeles at the age of 23. In the late 1980s, he worked as a still photographer on three films for the film producer Roger Corman.

His feature-film directorial debut was the 2008 horror comedy Mutant Vampire Zombies from the 'Hood!, starring C. Thomas Howell.

Levin subsequently wrote and directed multiple films for production company The Asylum, including the 2012 science-fiction action film American Warships and the 2013 science fiction film AE: Apocalypse Earth.

=== Sharknado ===
In 2013, Levin wrote the made-for-television disaster film Sharknado, about a tornado of shark-infested seawater. The film's debut on the Syfy cable channel attracted nearly 1.37 million viewers and generated nearly 5,000 tweets a minute at its peak.

In 2014, Levin wrote a sequel, Sharknado 2: The Second One, which had 3.9 million viewers. Levin subsequently wrote two more sequels, 2015's Sharknado 3: Oh Hell No! and 2016's Sharknado: The 4th Awakens.

Sharknado became a pop-culture phenomenon, ultimately spawning five sequels, a video game, a book, a one-shot comic book, a documentary, and a mockumentary.

== Filmography ==
Title	Year	Role	Notes
Zombie Tidal Wave	2019	story by	
The Last Sharknado: It's About Time	2018	based on characters created by	also appeared as "Bar Patron"
Megalodon	2018	story by	
Geo-Disaster	2017	director, written by	
Sharknado 5: Global Swarming	2017	based on characters created by	
Creature Features	2017	appeared as self	TV series
Mind Blown	2016	written by	
Sharknado: The 4th Awakens	2016	written by	
Sharknado: Feeding Frenzy	2015	appeared as self	documentary
Sharknado 3: Oh Hell No!	2015	written by	also appeared as "Mr. Benchley from The Post"
Infolist Pre Comic-Con Bash	2015	appeared as self	documentary short
Weekends with Alex Witt	2014	appeared as self	TV series
Sharknado 2: The Second One	2014	written by	
Sharknado	2013	written by	
From the Sea	2013	screenplay by	
AE: Apocalypse Earth	2013	director, written by	
American Warships	2012	director, writer	
200 M.P.H.	2011	written by	
Mutant Vampire Zombies from the 'Hood!	2008	director, written by, executive producer	
Venice Beach Sketches	2002	editor	
Soulmates A.K.A. Evil Lives	1992	director	
Wizards of the Lost Kingdom II	1989	still photographer	
Stripped to Kill II: Live Girls	1989	still photographer	
Saturday the 14th Strikes Back	1988	still photographer	
Hydrosub: 2021	1987	off-line assistant / production associate / appeared as "Crewman"	video game
The Rescue of Pops Ghostly	1987	off-line assistant / production associate	video game

== See also ==
- List of American writers
- List of film and television directors
- List of New York University alumni
- List of people from Los Angeles
- List of people from New York City
- List of science-fiction authors
