= Sharknado: The 4th Awakens =

2016 film by Anthony C. Ferrante

- Promotional release poster
- Written by: Thunder Levin
- Directed by: Anthony C. Ferrante
- Starring: Ian Ziering; Tara Reid; Masiela Lusha; Ryan Newman; Tommy Davidson; David Hasselhoff; Stassi Schroeder
- Music by: Christopher Cano; Chris Ridenhour; Don Frankel
- Country of origin: United States
- Original language: English

Production
- Producer: David Michael Latt
- Cinematography: Laura Beth Love
- Editor: Ana Florit
- Running time: 90 minutes
- Production companies: The Asylum; Syfy Films
- Budget: US$ 3 million

Original release
- Network: Syfy
- Release: July 31, 2016

Related
- Sharknado 3: Oh Hell No! (2015); Sharknado 5: Global Swarming (2017)

Sharknado: The 4th Awakens is a 2016 American made-for-television science fiction action comedy disaster film and the fifth installment in the Sharknado film series, following Sharknado, Sharknado 2: The Second One, and Sharknado 3: Oh Hell No!. The film was directed by Anthony C. Ferrante with Ian Ziering, Tara Reid, David Hasselhoff and Ryan Newman reprising their roles from the previous installments. New people joining the cast in the film include Tommy Davidson, Masiela Lusha, Imani Hakim, Cheryl Tiegs and Gary Busey. In the film, Fin Shepard and his allies, five years after the last sharknado, contend with a group of sharknado variants, such as a "cownado" and a "lightningnado".

The film premiered on Syfy in the United States on July 31, 2016. Though the film title, poster, and intro are a parody of the 2015 film Star Wars: The Force Awakens, it is not a mockbuster.

The seventh film, Sharknado 5: Global Swarming, was released on August 6, 2017.

== Plot ==
Tech company Astro-X has used their revolutionary energy system to prevent the formation of sharknadoes, using cheap, clean reactors dubbed Astro-Pods. To celebrate the five year anniversary of the eradication of sharknadoes, Astro-X founder Aston Reynolds announces that he will be hosting the grand opening of a shark-themed hotel in Las Vegas.

Fin Shepard has moved to a farm in Kansas named "April's Acres", where he lives with his mother Raye and his young son Gil. Fin travels to Las Vegas with his cousin Gemini to meet up with his son Matt, who has recently returned from deployment in Iraq. When Matt and his fiancée, Gabrielle, marry and skydive from a plane, a sandstorm develops, which cannot be defused by Astro-X. It absorbs the water and sharks from a giant tank located in Reynolds' hotel, creating a sharknado that floods the streets of Las Vegas. Fin, Gemini, Gabrielle, and Matt work together to survive the storm until it retreats into the desert.

At Astro-X, Colonel Shepard works on a weaponized mech suit with his granddaughter Claudia and head scientist Wilford Wexler. However, Fin and his family are unaware that Wilford has reconstructed his daughter and Fin's wife, April, into a cyborg in order to save her life, following her death in the previous movie, and falsely claims that her family was killed in the storm to keep her safe. Fin and the group take a train back to Kansas, but the Las Vegas sharknado follows them. They meet with Reynolds at an Astro-X facility, where Reynolds unsuccessfully recruits Fin to his side in order to recover from the negative publicity created from Astro-X's failure to stop the Las Vegas sharknado.

Meanwhile, April learns of Wilford's lies and escapes his lab. A "lavanado" forms in Yellowstone National Park, while a "hailnado" touches down at Astro-X's headquarters in San Francisco. April rescues Shepard and Claudia and reveals she's alive, leading them to become furious with Wilford for lying to them all. Fin and the group travel to April's Acres, where an approaching sharknado forces Raye and Gil into their underground bunker. Fin and the group arrive to fend off the sharks, but Gabrielle is killed. Fin, Gil, Gemini, and Matt seek shelter in the farmhouse, which is carried by the sharknado to Chicago. Reynolds uses new isotopes in his Astro-Pods to destroy the lavanado and the hailnado.

Reynolds flies Shepard, Claudia, and April to Fin's location in Chicago, where they rescue everyone from the rubble. April reunites with her family, allowing her to meet Gil for the first time. Meanwhile, Reynolds struggles to diffuse a "lightningnado" due to its electricity blocking their attempts. The situation worsens when the lightningnado strikes the Perry Nuclear Power Plant in Ohio, transforming it into a deadly "nukenado" filled with radioactive sharks. Reynolds realizes that the only way to diffuse the nukenado is to transform it back into a regular sharknado so that the Astro-Pods will work on it.

Reynolds suggests that the engines of Colonel Shepard's mech suit can be used to power a device to remove the radioactivity from the storm by drawing massive amounts of water into it. Fin realizes that the only location with enough water to work is Niagara Falls, in New York, so they travel there with the nukenado on their tail. Reynolds volunteers to jump from his jet in a squirrel suit to set off the device, which will reverse the water flow upward into the nukenado and cool it down. However, the device fails to have sufficient power, and the land below Reynolds cracks, sending him off the cliff into the water below to his death.

Shepard volunteers to pilot the mech suit to complete the plan, but he, Claudia, and Matt are swallowed by sharks. Fin puts on the suit and flies into the storm to reach the device. He uses the suit's power supply to activate the device, but he is severely injured. Niagara Falls is reversed into the nukenado, neutralizing its radiation and rendering it a normal sharknado. The Astro-Pods are activated, destroying the storm. Fin is swallowed by a shark, which is swallowed by three more sharks and a blue whale in quick succession. Gil uses a chainsaw to cut open the whale and sharks, revealing Shepard, Claudia, and Matt all alive.

They pull out an unconscious Fin, who they revive using April's power supply and two sharks as an improvised defibrillator. Suddenly, the Eiffel Tower falls from the sky. Nova, who was earlier mentioned to be vacationing in Paris, emerges from the tower, causing the Shepards to realize that the sharknado crisis may now be global.

== Cast ==
=== Principal cast ===
- Ian Ziering as Fin Shepard
- Tara Reid as April Wexler
- Tommy Davidson as Aston Reynolds
- Masiela Lusha as "Gemini", Fin's cousin
- Ryan Newman as Claudia Shepard
- Cody Linley as Matt Shepard
- Imani A. Hakim as Gabrielle, Matt's newlywed wife
- Cheryl Tiegs as Raye Shepard, Fin's mother
- Gary Busey as Wilford Wexler, April's father
- David Hasselhoff as Colonel Gilbert Shepard

=== Supporting cast ===
- Christopher Shone and Nicholas Shone as Little Gil
- Susan Anton as Betty, the Gambler
- Cynthia Bailey as Tech Addison
- Jillian Barberie as Train Passenger
- Benjy Bronk as Chicago Reporter
- Steffanie Busey as Craven
- Duane Chapman as "Chop Top", a chainsaw dealer
- Todd Chrisley as Himself
- Grayson Chrisley as Himself
- Savannah Chrisley as Herself
- Stacey Dash as Mayor Sandra Mansfield, of Chicago
- James Davis as Chippendale Dancer
- Jay DeMarcus as Zimmerman, Shark World Hotel Manager
- Justine Ezarik as Shatner
- Dan Farr as Himself
- David Faustino as Bud, a Las Vegas gambler
- Anthony C. Ferrante as Fenwick
- Juliana Ferrante as Juliana
- Erika Girardi as Tech Frances
- Gilbert Gottfried as Ron McDonald, Today Correspondent
- Lori Greiner as Herself, Home Shopping Network Guru
- Steve Guttenberg as Colton, an old friend of Fin and the owner of a car called Christine
- Gary Herbert as Himself
- Brandi Glanville as Tech Whitley, an Astro-X technician
- Hayley Hasselhoff as Supervisor Mary Jane
- Taylor-Ann Hasselhoff as Pilot Shaelyn
- Robert Herjavec as Supervisor Parker, Astro-X astrophysicist
- Kym Johnson as Supervisor Gwen, Astro-X astrophysicist
- Carrie Keagan as Supervisor Martindale, at Astro-X
- T'Keyah Crystal Keymah as Tech Terry, at Astro-X
- Moise Latt as Alex
- Daniel Logan as Captain Fett
- Courtney Lopez as Reporter Stormy G.
- Andre Meadows as Train Conductor
- Donna Mills as Supervisor Wink
- Jeanne Miller as EMT
- Frank Mir as Jamie, Head of Security of Shark World Hotel
- Kenya Moore as Monique
- Natalie Morales as Herself
- Vince Neil as Himself
- Roy Nelson as Donnie, the Pararazzo
- Wayne Newton as Himself
- Gena Lee Nolin as Neely Capshaw, Astro-X rocket scientist and former lifeguard
- Alexandra Paul as Stephanie Holden, Astro-X rocket scientist and former lifeguard
- Dr. Drew Pinsky as Pastor
- DeStorm Power as National Guardman
- Dolvett Quince as Mickey, the Trainer
- Mindy Robinson as Annie, the Fan
- Al Roker as Himself
- Seth Rollins as Astro-X Lopez
- Stassi Schroeder as Koening, Astro-X Manager of NYC
- Paul Shaffer as Himself, street musician
- Patti Stanger as Marley Craig (Reporter)
- Nathaniel Stroman as Agent Cronenberg
- Jax Taylor as National Guardsman #2
- Corey Taylor as Frankie, a security guard at the Shark World Hotel
- Diana Terranova as Salt Lake Comic Con Host
- Charles Tillman as Johnny Zucker
- Carrot Top as Driver
- Caroline Williams as "Stretch"
- Adrian Zmed as Himself
- Christine as Herself
- Petunia as Herself

Other notables, credited as background

- The Chippendales

== Production ==
The film was confirmed to follow upon Sharknado 3's premiere. Sharknado 3 concludes with a cliffhanger regarding whether or not April is killed by falling wreckage. An ad after the film promoted a Twitter campaign offering fans the chance to decide her fate with the hashtags "#AprilLives" or "#AprilDies", with the results revealed in the forthcoming Sharknado 4 which aired in July 2016. Ian Ziering, Tara Reid, Ryan Newman, and David Hasselhoff were announced to reprise their roles from previous films. New cast members include Masiela Lusha as Gemini, Fin's cousin, Cody Linley replacing Chuck Hittinger as Matt Shepard, Imani Hakim as Gabrielle, a soldier and Matt's girlfriend, Gary Busey as Wilford Wexler, April's rich father, Cheryl Tiegs as Raye Shepard, Fin's mother, Tommy Davidson as Aston Reynolds, playboy tech billionaire and Astro-X, Kenya Moore as Monique, a hotel manager working for Reynolds, Cynthia Bailey as Addison, a tech analyst, and Maya Stojan as Romy, Wilford's assistant and Anthony Rogers as Gil Shepard.

The title, poster, and opening crawl of the film is an homage to Star Wars: The Force Awakens. Sharknado: The 4th Awakens takes place in Chicago and Las Vegas.

== Reception ==
The film received mostly negative reviews. Rotten Tomatoes reports a 14% score with an average rating of 3.4/10, based on 14 critics. The consensus reads: "Sharknado: The 4th Awakens loses the ridiculous charm of its predecessors, leaving only clumsy social commentary and monotonous schtick that's lost its bite." On Metacritic it has a score of 35% based on reviews from 7 critics, indicating "generally unfavorable reviews".

The film was watched by 2.77 million people.

== Sequel ==
Rumors of a fifth film, to be titled Sharknado 5... Earth 0, first surfaced in October 2016. On February 2, 2017, The Asylum confirmed via their official Facebook page that the fifth film had entered production under the working title Sharknado 5, with Ian Ziering, Tara Reid and Cassie Scerbo reprising their roles as Fin, April and Nova, respectively. In Sharknado 5, Fin and his wife April travel around the world trying to save their young son who is trapped inside a sharknado. On June 1, 2017, the title was unveiled to be Sharknado 5: Global Swarming with the tagline "Make America Bait Again". A year later, The Last Sharknado: It's About Time! was announced.
