= Sharknado 5: Global Swarming =

2017 film by Anthony C. Ferrante

- Promotional release poster
- Written by: Scotty Mullen
- Directed by: Anthony C. Ferrante
- Starring: Ian Ziering; Tara Reid; Cassie Scerbo; Billy Barratt
- Music by: Christopher Cano; Chris Ridenhour; Don Frankel
- Country of origin: United States
- Original language: English

Production
- Producer: David Michael Latt
- Cinematography: Ryan Broomberg
- Editors: Ana Florit; Ryan Mitchelle
- Running time: 90 minutes
- Production companies: The Asylum; Syfy Films
- Budget: $5 million

Original release
- Network: Syfy
- Release: August 6, 2017

Related
- Sharknado: The 4th Awakens (2016); The Last Sharknado: It's About Time (2018)

Sharknado 5: Global Swarming (stylized on-screen as 5harknado: Global Swarming) is a 2017 American made-for-television science fiction comedy disaster film and the seventh installment in the Sharknado film series, following Sharknado, Sharknado 2: The Second One, Sharknado 3: Oh Hell No!, and Sharknado: The 4th Awakens.

The film was directed by Anthony C. Ferrante, with Ian Ziering, Tara Reid and Cassie Scerbo reprising their roles from the previous installments, along with newcomer Dolph Lundgren and the usual dozens of cameo roles by various celebrities. In the film, lead characters Fin and April travel around the world instantaneously by going through portals at the top of tornadoes in order to save their son Gil, who has been swept up in a sharknado. They visit several places like Sydney, Rio de Janeiro, and Giza.

The eighth film, The Last Sharknado: It's About Time, was released on August 19, 2018.

== Plot ==
Following the events of the previous film, Fin and April travel to London with their young son Gil to attend a NATO meeting regarding the escalating sharknado threat. Meanwhile, Nova and her assistants investigate a temple hidden beneath Stonehenge, and Nova summons Fin to aid her. They discover a shrine dedicated to an ancient shark god and collect an artifact, which has the unforeseen consequence of unleashing a new type of sharknado with a dimensional vortex inside it. The sharknado heads toward London, and Fin rallies the Buckingham Palace guards to defeat it. They manage to survive the sharknado, but Gil is pulled into the storm and vanishes.

Fin, April and Nova realize that Gil is still alive and track him using a signal emitted by a special helmet given to him earlier by British scientists. They board an airship created and piloted by inventor Dr. Angel and pursue Gil to Switzerland, but the ship is caught in a sharknado and crashes, killing Dr. Angel while Fin's group steal skis and battle the sharknado as they head down the slopes. Eventually, they are engulfed by the sharknado and teleported to Sydney, Australia through the vortex, where April's cybernetic body is badly damaged in a shark attack. Nova brings April to her allies Orion and Electra for repairs, then reveals to Fin that she leads the "Sharknado Sisterhood," a global organization dedicated to destroying the sharknados. Orion and Electra are members of the Sisterhood, as is Fin's cousin Gemini, who is supervising the ship carrying the nuclear waste left behind from the nukenado at Niagara Falls. Fin is angered that Nova kept Gemini's role in the group a secret and sets out with the upgraded April to pursue Gil. Meanwhile, a sharknado strikes Gemini's ship and absorbs the nuclear waste, causing it to mutate into a shark-shaped mass of sharks that begins heading toward Japan.

Fin and April end up in Rio de Janeiro, where they meet another member of the Sisterhood at an old church and learn the ancient myths behind the sharknados and the vortex, being told that "Sharknado is mathematical and this is part of the Universe, and that the Earth has many portals." An art thief steals the artifact during the meeting, leading to a car chase that ends up in the Colosseum in Rome, Italy when a sharknado teleports both vehicles. Fin and April recover the artifact and are summoned by the Pope, who encourages Fin to continue his mission to save Gil and the world and supplies him with a special chainsaw for the fight to come. Using the artifact, Fin and April summon a sharknado and nearly manage to recover Gil, but he slips out of their grasp and all three are pulled into the vortex.

Fin and April emerge in Tokyo, where the nuclear mass of sharks - now dubbed "Sharkzilla" by the global media - is rampaging. They discover that Gil is trapped inside Sharkzilla's mass, and Nova arrives with the remaining members of the Sisterhood to defeat the creature. Nova skydives into Sharkzilla and begins fighting her way to Gil, but when military fighter jets bomb the mass, it explodes. Gil vanishes, seemingly killed in the blast, while Nova is mortally wounded and dies after Fin forgives her and accepts her as part of their family. Shortly thereafter, Fin receives a call from his son Matt, who frantically tells him that all the members of their family are dead before he is killed himself by a sharknado striking the family farm in Kansas. Distraught, but with nothing else left to lose, Fin and April decide to try returning the artifact to Stonehenge in the hopes that doing so will stop the escalating sharknado outbreak.

However, the sharknado they summon instead teleports them to the Pyramids of Giza in Egypt, where they find hieroglyphs indicating that the Egyptians also knew of the shark god and the vortex, which is inside the Earth's core. Fin and April discover an ancient mechanism that causes the pyramids to open up and absorb the energy of the vortex upon its activation, seemingly ending the outbreak. Just as everything seems to be back to normal, however, the mechanism reverses and the vortex energy erupts from the Earth, triggering a global sharknado that consumes the entire world, killing Gemini who is still in Tokyo. Unable to shut down the device, Fin and April rush outside to discover a sharknado and tsunami heading towards them. While Fin protects their position using the staff he found in the pyramid, manipulating the energy of the Vortex, causing an Energy Shock against the Sharknado, April uses her ability to absorb energy to absorb the entire planetary vortex, sacrificing herself to end the global sharknado. Her actions stop the storm but cause her body to explode, and Fin is left as seemingly the last human on Earth, with all life having seemingly been wiped out.

Fin collects April's head in a bag attached to the staff and begins wandering the ruined planet in a desperate but fruitless search for other survivors. Sometime later, a truck emerges from a bright light and approaches him, driven by a greatly aged Gil, who still possesses his flight insignia and the helmet that protected him from the sharks. When Sharkzilla exploded, it caused a reaction that sent him back in time, and Gil spent all the time since then developing a way to use the sharknado as a time machine. Reunited, Fin and Gil set off into the past in order to defeat the sharknados once and for all and save their family and friends.

== Cast ==
=== Principal cast ===
- Ian Ziering as Fin Shepard
- Tara Reid as April Wexler
- Cassie Scerbo as Nova Clarke
- Billy Barratt as Gil Shepard Jr.
- Dolph Lundgren as Mature Gil Shepard

=== Supporting cast ===
- Tiffany Pollard as Vega
- Porsha Williams as Andromeda
- Tony Hawk as "The Hawk"
- Olivia Newton-John as Orion
- Sasha Cohen as Olympic Ice Skater
- Al Roker as Himself
- Hoda Kotb as Herself
- Geraldo Rivera as Dr. Angel
- Margaret Cho as Simone
- Clay Aiken as Llewelyn
- Downtown Julie Brown as Consigliere
- Fabio as The Pope
- Gilbert Gottfried as Ron McDonald
- Abby Lee Miller as Dr. Bramble
- Charo as The Queen
- Claudia Jordan as Ursa
- Yanet García as Chara
- Chris Kattan as Prime Minister
- Doug Censor Martin as Jock, The Helicopter Pilot
- Samantha Fox as Ms. Moore
- Jeff Rossen as Himself
- Kate Garraway as Herself
- Charlotte Hawkins as Herself
- Laura Tobin as Herself
- Louie Spence as Calvin, The Clerk
- Katie Price as Connery
- Bret Michaels as Himself
- Kathie Lee Gifford as Herself
- Tom Daley as Himself
- Shel Rasten as Prince
- David Naughton Ambassador Kessler
- Lucy Pinder as Swedish Ambassador
- Jena Sims as NATO Delegate Lee
- Ross Mullan as Dr. Wobbegon
- Nichelle Nichols as Secretary General Starr
- Casey Batchelor as Lady Anne
- Luisa Zissman as The Duchess
- India Thain as Dottie, The Maid
- Kiril Andreev as Himself
- Noush Skaugen as Helga, The Maid
- Liliana Nova as Svetlanda
- Gus Kenworthy as Skier
- Russell Hodgkinson as Steven
- Anthony C. Ferrante as Dundee
- Karl Stefanovic as Himself
- Lisa Wilkinson as Herself
- Chloe Lattanzi as Electra
- Spencer Matthews as Sailor Dan
- Caprice Bourret as Polaris
- John Morrison as Rodolfo
- LaChelle Hunt as "Pisces"
- Greg Louganis as Zico
- Victor Lamoglia as Bernard
- Nathalie Odzierejko as Nicola
- Marc Jarousseau as Claude
- Jai Rodriguez as Peter
- Audrey Latt, Brady Latt and Moise Latt as Japanese Hotel Kids
- Shin Kinoshita as Shin
- Cat Greenleaf as Herself
- Dan Fogler as Himself
- Benjy Bronk as Howard Beale
- Yoshie Morino as Jasmine
- Bai Ling as Mira
- Edward Grimes as Cameron
- John Grimes as Mick
- Oliver Kalkofe and Peter Rütten as Tele 5 Schlefaz News Studio Anchors
- Olli Schulz as Demonstration Guy
- Jan Delay and Stefan Sandrock as Men in Front of Townhall Hamburg
- Linda Zervakis as News Anchor Woman
- Dietmar Wischmeyer as Country Side Reporter
- Sarah Knappik as Street Reporter
- Bela B. as Police Guy
- Joko Winterscheidt and Klaas Heufer-Umlauf as Weapons Testers
- Oliver Welke as Sharknado News Anchor
- Tim Mälzer as Guy with the Biggest Fish in the Harbor of Hamburg
- Rob Vegas as Guy Next to the Guy with the Biggest Fish
- Markus Lanz as Talk Show Anchor
- Ingrid van Bergen and Dieter Nuhr as Talk Show Guests
- Thomas Koschwitz as Berlin Skyline City Reporter #1
- Julia Gámez Martin as Berlin Skyline City Reporter #2
- Simone Panteleit as Weather Reporter
- Sascha Vollmer as Guy with the Hammer
- Ana Florit, Andi Royer, Caroline Dillon, Courtney Quod, Diana Latt, Jennifer Quod, Jess Park, Kendall Anlian, Lisa Pirro, Madyson Hayes, Maeve Harris, Maria Cardoza, Michael Hardman, Sandy Latt, Sara Ann Fox, Sheila Goldfinger, Susee Villasenor, Tammy Klein and Veronica Palominos as Sharknado Sisters

Guest stars

- Cody Linley as Matt Shepard
- Masiela Lusha as Gemini

== Production ==
A fifth Sharknado film was confirmed in October 2016, and was released on August 6, 2017. The title was going to be Sharknado 5... Earth 0, but on June 1, 2017, the title was unveiled to be Sharknado 5: Global Swarming with the tagline "Make America Bait Again." The tagline and title were selected via fan submission and voting. The tagline "Make America Bait Again" was submitted by James Guill, a freelance poker writer. His tagline was a parody to the popular slogan "Make America Great Again" by Donald Trump.

== Reception ==
On Rotten Tomatoes it has an approval rating of 30% based on reviews from 10 critics.

Les Chappell of The A.V. Club gave the film a grade A, and wrote: "Somehow, Sharknado 5: Global Swarming pulls the franchise back from the brink and returns it to what it's supposed to be: fun to watch."
