= American Warships =

- DVD cover
- Directed by: Thunder Levin
- Written by: Thunder Levin
- Produced by: David Michael Latt; David Rimawi; Paul Bales
- Starring: Mario Van Peebles; Carl Weathers; Johanna Watts
- Cinematography: Stuart Brereton
- Edited by: Karl Armstrong
- Music by: Chris Ridenhour
- Distributed by: The Asylum
- Release date: May 15, 2012
- Running time: 90 minutes
- Country: United States
- Language: English
- Budget: $1 million

American Warships is a 2012 science fiction war film directed by Thunder Levin and distributed by The Asylum. It premiered on the Syfy Channel on May 15, 2012. In the tradition of The Asylum's film catalog, the film is an extremely low-budget mockbuster of the Hasbro Studios/Universal Pictures film Battleship.

Initially, the film was titled American Battleship, but Universal later involved The Asylum in a copyright lawsuit over the film due to its resemblance to their film. As a result of the controversy, the film's name was changed to American Warships.

== Plot ==
USS Iowa is on its final voyage before being decommissioned and turned into a floating museum. When USS Enterprise is attacked and destroyed by a mysterious force, World War III looms. The captain of Iowa chases an invisible ship, which they discover to be an alien force waging war on Earth. Only the crew of this last American battleship stands in their way. (lowa's outdated technology is immune to the alien's electromagnetic pulse (EMP) weapons.)

During the fight in Washington, D.C., General McKraken attempted to steer the high-stakes game of brinkmanship between the U.S. and other world powers as several coastal towns in North Korea were also attacked, in an apparent attempt by the aliens to get the world to destroy itself. McKraken's diplomatic efforts attempted to buy Iowa time to provide proof of the alien incursion.

== Cast ==
- Mario Van Peebles as Captain Winston
- Carl Weathers as General McKraken
- Elijah Chester as Secretary of Defense Alter
- Johanna Watts as Lieutenant Caroline Bradley
- Nikki McCauley as Julia Flynn
- Devin McGhee as Lieutenant Commander Juarez
- Mandela Van Peebles as Lookout Dunbar
- Josh Cohen as Weapons Officer Clancy
- David Polinsky as Admiral Hollis
- William Sudbrock as Helmsman
- Robin Dale Robertson as Major

== Reception ==
The Geek Twins rated the film 2 1/2 out of five stars.
