= Sharknado (film series) =

American film series

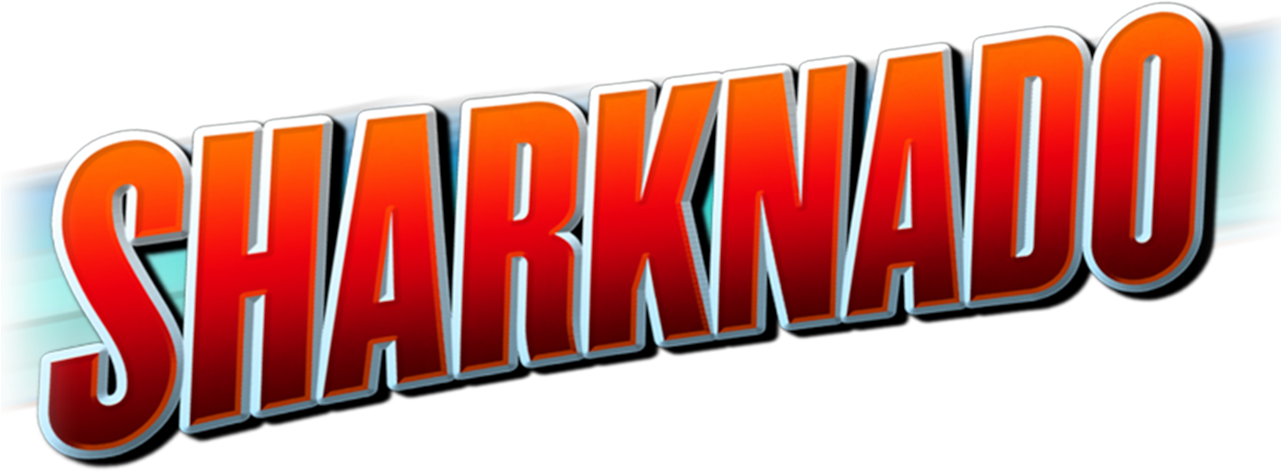
- Official film series logo
- Created by: Thunder Levin
- Owners: Syfy; NBCUniversal Television Group; The Asylum
- Years: 2013–present

Print publications
- Book(s): How to Survive a Sharknado and Other Unnatural Disasters: Fight Back When Monsters and Mother Nature Attack
- Comics: Archie vs. Sharknado (2015)

Films and television
- Film(s): Original series: Sharknado (2013); Sharknado 2: The Second One (2014); Sharknado 3: Oh Hell No! (2015); Sharknado: The 4th Awakens (2016); Sharknado 5: Global Swarming (2017); The Last Sharknado: It's About Time (2018); Prequel: Sharknado Origins (TBA); Spin-off series: Lavalantula (2015); 2 Lava 2 Lantula! (2016); Crossover: 2025 Armageddon (2022)

Games
- Video game(s): Sharknado: The Video Game (2014); Sharknado VR (2018)

Sharknado is an American nine-film made-for-television science fiction action comedy horror disaster film series released by Syfy between 2013 and 2020. It has since been expanded into video games and comics, including a spin-off mockumentary film, Sharknado: Heart of Sharkness, that was released in 2015. The first two films received mixed to positive reviews from critics, while the others received negative reviews.

The series stars Ian Ziering as Fin Shepard and Tara Reid as April Wexler—a husband and wife who encounter "sharknadoes", tornadoes filled with sharks, wherever they go.

== Films ==
Film	U.S. release date	Director(s)	Screenwriter(s)	Story by	Producer(s)
Original series
Sharknado	July 11, 2013	Anthony C. Ferrante	Thunder Levin	—N/a	David Michael Latt
Sharknado 2: The Second One	July 30, 2014	Anthony C. Ferrante	Thunder Levin	—N/a	David Michael Latt
Sharknado 3: Oh Hell No!	July 22, 2015	Anthony C. Ferrante	Thunder Levin	—N/a	David Michael Latt
Sharknado: The 4th Awakens	July 31, 2016	Anthony C. Ferrante	Thunder Levin	—N/a	David Michael Latt
Sharknado 5: Global Swarming	August 6, 2017	Anthony C. Ferrante	Scotty Mullen	—N/a	David Michael Latt
The Last Sharknado: It's About Time	August 19, 2018	Anthony C. Ferrante	Scotty Mullen	—N/a	David Michael Latt
Prequel
Sharknado Origins	TBA	Anthony C. Ferrante	TBA	—N/a	TBA
Spin-off series
Lavalantula	July 25, 2015	Mike Mendez	Neil Elman, Mike Mendez & Ashley O'Neil	—N/a	Anthony Fankhauser & Lisa M. Hansen
2 Lava 2 Lantula!	August 6, 2016	Nick Simon	Neil Elman & Ashley O'Neil	—N/a	Anthony Fankhauser & Lisa M. Hansen
Crossover
2025 Armageddon	December 16, 2022	Michael Su	Marc Gottlieb, Glenn Campbell & Tammy Klein	—N/a	David Michael Latt

=== Original series ===
==== Sharknado (2013) ====
A freak hurricane hits Los Angeles, causing man-eating sharks to be scooped up in water spouts and flood the city with shark-infested seawater. Bar-owner and surfer Fin (Ian Ziering) sets out with his friends to rescue his estranged wife, April (Tara Reid), and their teenage daughter, Claudia, before the "sharknado" reaches them.

==== Sharknado 2: The Second One (2014) ====
While Fin and April are in New York City to promote April's book, How to Survive a Sharknado and Other Unnatural Disasters, about the Los Angeles sharknado, the city is hit by a severe storm causing new "sharknadoes" to emerge.

==== Sharknado 3: Oh Hell No! (2015) ====
Following the events of the previous film, Fin and April have remarried and are expecting another child. For his heroics in the "sharknado" battles in Los Angeles and New York, Fin is in Washington, D.C., to receive an award from the president. However, when he is there he encounters a new "sharknado" which begins to make its way down the "Feast Coast" to Florida.

==== Sharknado: The 4th Awakens (2016) ====
Sharknado 4 was confirmed to follow upon Sharknado 3's premiere. Sharknado 3 concludes with a cliffhanger regarding whether or not April is killed by falling wreckage. An ad after the film promotes a Twitter campaign offering fans the chance to decide her fate with the hashtags "#AprilLives" or "#AprilDies", with the results revealed at the start of Sharknado 4, which first aired on Syfy on July 31, 2016. Ian Ziering, Tara Reid, Ryan Newman, and David Hasselhoff reprise their roles from previous films. New cast members include: Tommy Davidson as Aston Reynolds, playboy tech billionaire and Astro-X president; Cody Linley replacing Chuck Hittinger as Matt Shepard; Imani Hakim as Gabrielle, a soldier and Matt's wife; Gary Busey as Wilford Wexler, April's rich father; Cheryl Tiegs as Raye Shepard, Fin's mother; Masiela Lusha as Gemini, Fin's cousin.

The title and poster of the film is a homage to Star Wars: The Force Awakens.

==== Sharknado 5: Global Swarming (2017) ====
A fifth Sharknado film was confirmed in October 2016, and was released on August 6, 2017. The title was going to be Sharknado 5... Earth 0, but on June 1, 2017, the title was unveiled to be Sharknado 5: Global Swarming with the tagline "Make America Bait Again", a reference to the political slogan "Make America Great Again" popularized by then-President Donald Trump. Ian Ziering and Tara Reid reprised their roles as Fin Shepard and April Wexler. Cassie Scerbo also reprised for this installment. Filming occurred in more than 5 countries, including the UK, Australia and Bulgaria. This storyline depicts Fin and his allies accidentally unleashing a new wave of sharknados when they deactivate an ancient device that was actually keeping the Sharknados in check, the subsequent storms escalating to the point that they devastate the planet, leaving only Fin alive, until he is met by a time-displaced version of his son Gil.

==== The Last Sharknado: It's About Time (2018) ====
The Last Sharknado: It's About Time was released on August 19, 2018. Tara Reid, Ian Ziering and Cassie Scerbo returned. A write-up in Bloody Disgusting in February 2018 said: "In his quest, Fin fights Nazis, dinosaurs, knights, and even takes a ride on Noah's Ark." On March 28, 2018, Syfy confirmed the film would be the final installment of the series. On May 25, the film's title was revealed by a released teaser trailer. Vivica A. Fox, who had starred in Sharknado 2, reprises her role for the final installment. With Fin the last survivor, he finds himself travelling through time to meet supposedly-deceased allies (pulled out of time by Gil at the moment before their deaths) seeking to identify and prevent the first of the modern-day Sharknados. After subduing potential Sharknados in Camelot, the War of Independence, and the Wild West, Fin is able to destroy the original Sharknado before it could escalate into the global catastrophes he has witnessed, creating a new timeline where Fin is still just the bar owner he was in the original film, surrounded by his extended family.

=== Prequel ===
==== Sharknado Origins (TBA) ====
In November 2025, a prequel titled Sharknado Origins was announced to be in development. The film is planned for a Summer 2026 release and will follow Fin and April encountering a Sharknado as teenagers.

=== Spin-off series ===
==== Lavalantula (2015) ====
Lavalantula is a spin-off of Sharknado, about fire spitting tarantulas causing havoc over Los Angeles, starring some of the cast from Police Academy. It features an appearance by Ian Ziering as Fin Shepard - tying the film into the Sharknado universe.

==== 2 Lava 2 Lantula! (2016) ====
A sequel to Lavalantula called 2 Lava 2 Lantula! premiered on Syfy on August 6, 2016. Some of the cast from the original film returned, including Steve Guttenberg, Marion Ramsey and Michael Winslow.

=== Crossover ===
==== 2025 Armageddon (2022) ====
2025 Armageddon is a crossover film released to celebrate the 25th anniversary of The Asylum and features an alien race using Sharknado alongside other films from The Asylum as the basis for monsters sent to attack Earth. The film was released on digital storefronts on December 23, 2022.

== Cast and crew ==
=== Cast ===
List indicators
- This table only includes characters which have appeared in more than one film in the series.
- A dark grey cell indicates the character was not in the film.
- A ^{A} indicates an appearance through archival footage or audio

Characters	Films					
Characters	Sharknado	Sharknado 2: The Second One	Sharknado 3: Oh Hell No!	Sharknado: The 4th Awakens	Sharknado 5: Global Swarming	The Last Sharknado: It's About Time
Characters	2013	2014	2015	2016	2017	2018
Fin Shepard	Ian Ziering	Ian Ziering	Ian Ziering	Ian Ziering	Ian Ziering	Ian Ziering
April Wexler	Tara Reid	Tara Reid	Tara Reid	Tara Reid	Tara Reid	Tara Reid
Claudia Shepard	Aubrey Peeples		Ryan Newman	Ryan Newman		Ryan Newman
Nova Clarke	Cassie Scerbo		Cassie Scerbo		Cassie Scerbo	Cassie Scerbo
Matt Shepard	Chuck Hittinger			Cody Linley	Cody Linley	Chuck Hittinger
George	John Heard					John Heard^{A}
Martin Brody		Mark McGrath	Mark McGrath			Mark McGrath
Skye		Vivica A. Fox				Vivica A. Fox
Mick and Cameron			Jedward (John and Edward) Grimes	Jedward (John and Edward) Grimes	Jedward (John and Edward) Grimes	
Gil Shepard			David Hasselhoff	David Hasselhoff		
Gemini				Masiela Lusha	Masiela Lusha	Masiela Lusha
Gil Shepard Jr.				Christopher Shone and Nicholas Shone	Billy Barratt Dolph Lundgren (as Mature Gil)	Brendan Petrizzo (as Hologram Gil); M. Steven Felty (as Voice of Hologram Gil) Matie Moncea (as Gil on Dinosaur) Tiberiu Hansen (as Medieval Gil) Chris Owen (as 30 year old Gil) Bob Ellis (as Surfer Gil)

=== Crew ===
Occupation	Sharknado	Sharknado 2: The Second One	Sharknado 3: Oh Hell No!	Sharknado: The 4th Awakens	Sharknado 5: Global Swarming	The Last Sharknado: It's About Time
Occupation	2013	2014	2015	2016	2017	2018
Director	Anthony C. Ferrante	Anthony C. Ferrante	Anthony C. Ferrante	Anthony C. Ferrante	Anthony C. Ferrante	Anthony C. Ferrante
Producer	David Michael Latt	David Michael Latt	David Michael Latt	David Michael Latt	David Michael Latt	David Michael Latt
Writer	Thunder Levin	Thunder Levin	Thunder Levin	Thunder Levin	Scotty Mullen	Scotty Mullen
Editor	William Boodell	Ana Florit; Vashi Nedomansky	Christopher Roth	Ana Florit	Ana Florit; Ryan Mitchelle	Ryan Mitchelle
Cinematography	Ben Demaree	Ben Demaree	Ben Demaree; Laura Beth Love; Scott Wheeler	Laura Beth Love	Ryan Broomberg	Pătru Păunescu
Composer	Ramin Kousha	Christopher Cano; Chris Ridenhour	Christopher Cano; Chris Ridenhour	Christopher Cano; Chris Ridenhour	Christopher Cano; Chris Ridenhour	Christopher Cano; Chris Ridenhour
Production Company	Syfy Films; The Asylum	Syfy Films; The Asylum	Syfy Films; The Asylum	Syfy Films; The Asylum	Syfy Films; The Asylum	Syfy Films; The Asylum
Distributor	Syfy	Syfy	Syfy	Syfy	Syfy	Syfy

== Reception ==
=== U.S. television ratings ===
Film	Release date	U.S. viewers (millions)	18–49 rating	Budget	Ref(s)
Sharknado	July 11, 2013	1.37	—N/a	$2 million	
Sharknado 2: The Second One	July 30, 2014	3.87	1.6	$1.5–2 million	
Sharknado 3: Oh Hell No!	July 22, 2015	2.81	0.9	$2.4 million	
Sharknado: The 4th Awakens	July 31, 2016	2.77	0.8	$3 million	
Sharknado 5: Global Swarming	August 6, 2017	1.89	0.6	$5 million	
The Last Sharknado: It's About Time	August 19, 2018	1.42	0.3	$3 million	

=== Critical and public response ===
Film	Rotten Tomatoes	Metacritic
Sharknado	77% (22 reviews)	—N/a (3 reviews)
Sharknado 2: The Second One	61% (31 reviews)	50 (17 reviews)
Sharknado 3: Oh Hell No!	36% (33 reviews)	53 (19 reviews)
Sharknado: The 4th Awakens	14% (14 reviews)	35 (7 reviews)
Sharknado 5: Global Swarming	30% (10 reviews)	—N/a
The Last Sharknado: It's About Time	27% (11 reviews)	22 (5 reviews)

== Other media ==
=== Video games ===
==== Sharknado: The Video Game ====
Sharknado: The Video Game is a 2014 endless running video game developed by Other Ocean Interactive and published by Majesco. It was based on Sharknado 2: The Second One and was released for iOS on July 25, 2014. It was delisted from the App Store in 2017.

==== Sharknado VR ====
Sharknado VR: Eye of the Storm (or Sharknado VR) is a virtual reality first person wave shooter developed by Autumn VR and Melcher Studios and published Autumn VR. The game was released for Oculus/Meta on November 5, 2018, Steam on November 7, 2018, and PlayStation VR on April 8, 2020 as a budget title. The game is based on the franchise as a whole in which players are stranded in the eye of a tornado as they use weapons ranging from a chainsaw to a shotgun, a machine gun and many other weapons, as they try and survive the onslaught of sharks in waves. Other objectives for players include saving as many people as they can that wander onto the surrounding battlefield while dodging many different kinds of sharks, barracudas, octopuses, and jellyfish. Players can also use a slow motion ability to score combo kills and use points to upgrade existing weapons to deal with great threats and challenges. The few reviews for the game are mostly "unfavorable" to "average".

=== Book ===
==== How to Survive a Sharknado and Other Unnatural Disasters: Fight Back When Monsters and Mother Nature Attack ====
How to Survive a Sharknado and Other Unnatural Disasters: Fight Back When Monsters and Mother Nature Attack is a book by Andrew Shaffer, a real-life version of the book-within-the-movie Sharknado 2: The Second One.

=== Comic book ===
==== Archie vs. Sharknado ====
Archie vs. Sharknado is a one-shot comic book published by Archie Comics as a Sharknado 3: Oh Hell No! tie-in on July 22, 2015, the same day the film premiered. The book deals with Riverdale being hit by a storm of sharknadoes and Archie and the gang having to deal with them as they make their way down the "Feast Coast". The one-shot was written by series director Anthony C. Ferrante, with art by longtime Archie artist Dan Parent. The comic book received an average score of 7.2/10 based on 15 critical reviews according to review aggregator Comic Book Roundup.

=== Documentaries ===
==== Sharknado: Feeding Frenzy (2015) ====
Sharknado: Feeding Frenzy is a documentary about the making of the first two Sharknado movies, as well as a teaser for Sharknado 3: Oh Hell No!, which aired the next day.

==== Sharknado: Heart of Sharkness (2015) ====
The mockumentary tells the story of David Moore, the filmmaker who first dreamed of "sharks in a tornado" and brought on disaster by using real sharks. It was written and directed by Jeremy Wagener, and released on October 6, 2015 on video on demand.

==== The Real Sharknado (2021) ====
During the 2021 Shark Week, Discovery Channel aired a special starring Ian Ziering and Tara Reid as themselves debunking many of the shark myths from the film series. It originally aired on July 14, 2021.
