= Vipers (film) =

- Teaser poster
- Written by: Brian Katkin
- Directed by: Bill Corcoran
- Starring: Tara Reid; Jonathan Scarfe; Corbin Bernsen; Genevieve Buechner; Aaron Pearl; Mercedes McNab
- Theme music composer: Lawrence Shragge
- Country of origin: United States
- Original language: English

Production
- Producer: Mary Anne Waterhouse
- Cinematography: Thomas Burstyn
- Editor: Lisa Binkley
- Running time: 95 minutes

Original release
- Network: Sci Fi Channel
- Release: September 21, 2008

Vipers is a 2008 American television film directed by Bill Corcoran and starring Tara Reid and Jonathan Scarfe. It premiered on the Sci Fi Channel on September 21, 2008, and was released on DVD on September 23, 2008. The name of the film was inspired by the Co/Ed softball team of the same name, playing games in the summer months throughout the Capital Region. It is the twelfth film in the Maneater film series.

== Plot ==
Universal Bio Tech Research Facility secretly works on enhancing horned viper snakes with poison C12 for their venom to cure disease. The enhanced venom cures a woman of breast cancer. The snakes, however, murder four people. Aided by his own men, a man named Jon Staffin subdues the staff to steal the snakes. In the ensuing struggle, the snakes get released and kill everybody except Staffin, who escapes. The snakes then rapidly repopulate.

On the island of Eden Cove, a couple is murdered on a beach. Meanwhile, policeman Cal Taylor visits Doc Jim Silverton. Sheriff Tom Hendricks eventually calls Doc, saying that teenager Maggie broke into a store to smoke marihuana. Doc and Cal visit the store's secret marihuana garden.

Outside, a snakes bites Jake, a child. At a clinic, Cal injects Jake with antivenom, stabilizing him. The store's owner, Nicky, is imprisoned for growing marihuana. Meanwhile, Dr. Vera Collins, who works at Universal Bio Tech, says that she needs to examine Jake's bite to determine if it comes from one of their vipers. Burton, the CEO, introduces Staffin as his security chief and sends his team out with her.

At his inn, Maggie's father Jack and a woman named Georgie have sex. The vipers later kill Georgie. Using tools Cal unintentionally left, Nicky escapes prison and enters the inn. There, Cal saves Nicky from a viper.

After finding vipers nearby, Tom tells everyone to run for the inn, however Maggie runs the wrong way. The snakes intrude the lobby, but Cal scares them off with a fire extinguisher. Jack's stranged wife Ellie leaves to look for Maggie, her daughter. Ellie finds Maggie, but they soon get surrounded. Tom then saves Maggie and locks her in the safe room at Tom's office. The snakes kill Tom, and Jack saves Ellie. They get cornered outside the office, but Cal and Nicky use the extinguisher to deter the snakes while they all hide in a non-functioning van. Cal eventually gets bitten. They enter a café, but Ellie gets killed, and the rest barricades themselves into the building using ice, inferring that the snakes do not like the cold. En route to the inn, Doc, Staffin and Vera use grenades of C12 to subdue the snakes, which eventually kill one of Burton's men. Jack takes Maggie, Nicky and Cal to the inn.

Everyone meets up there. The townspeople try to leave using the boat Bio Tech arrived on. This leads to a fight in which Jack gets killed. The townspeople leave the inn. Many are attacked while attempting to reach the boats. The remainder retreat back to the inn, where the snakes try to get in. They kill one, while trying to barricade the doors. One of Staffin's men, Lewison, eventually admits that they were actually sent to capture vipers. Aircraft is coming in the morning to gas Eden, killing everyone left there.

Everyone goes to where Jack stored a truck. Lewison drives it while Cal, Staffin, Nicky, Vera and townsperson Brownie attract the snakes off the boat with heat sources and guide them to a greenhouse. Doc guides the rest of the townspeople to the boat. Maggie takes off but Doc cannot chase after her and departs with the boat. Lewison is bitten, and Maggie uses C12 to temporarily subdue the snakes, saving Cal. Staffin gets bitten and, when he dies, they realize that he had a radio on him the entire time. He was planning to escape by himself and leave everyone else to die. Via Radio, Vera demands Burton to call the attack off, to no avail. The snakes kill Brownie.

Nicky and Vera use flares and propane tanks to ignite the greenhouse, causing an explosion. The aircraft arrives, but Doc gets through to them, and the island is not gassed. Burton is arrested, as Cal recorded a conversation with Vera admitting his plan to kill everyone. Burton is later out on bail, but a snake hiding in his car later kills him.

== Cast ==
- Tara Reid as Nicky Swift
- Jonathan Scarfe as Cal Taylor
- Corbin Bernsen as Burton
- Genevieve Buechner as Maggie Martin
- Aaron Pearl as Jack Martin
- Mercedes McNab as Georgie
- Claire Rankin as Ellie Martin
- Michael Kopsa as John Staffen
- Jessica Steen as Dr. Collins
- Don S. Davis as Dr. Silverton
- Mark Humphrey as Sheriff Hendricks
- Ellen Mcgillveray as Body On Bridge

== Reception ==
Dread Central said, "Vipers is the sort of nature gone amok movie that if it had been made 20-30 years ago, we’d be looking back on it today saying it may not have been a very good movie but we enjoyed it anyway."
