= Ian Ziering =

American actor (born 1964)

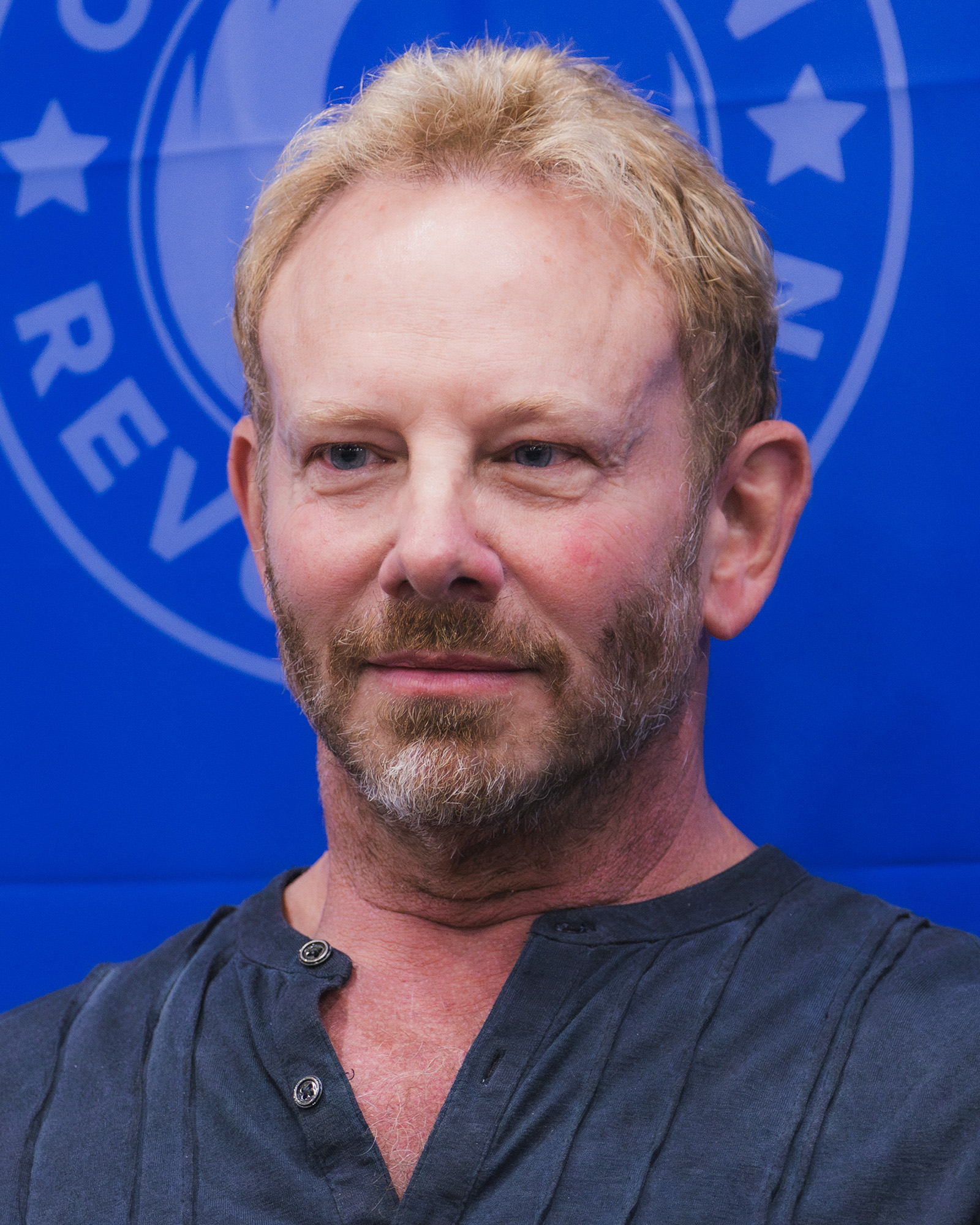
- Ziering in 2026
- Born: Ian Andrew Ziering; March 30, 1964 (age 62); Newark, New Jersey, U.S.
- Education: William Paterson University
- Occupation: Actor
- Years active: 1981–present
- Spouses: Nikki Schieler (m. 1997; div. 2002); Erin Ludwig (m. 2010; div. 2022)
- Children: 2

Ian Andrew Ziering (/ˈaɪən ˈzɪərɪŋ/; born March 30, 1964) is an American actor best known for his role as Steve Sanders on the television series Beverly Hills, 90210 (1990–2000). He is also the voice of Harry Osborn in Spider-Man: The New Animated Series and Vinnie on Biker Mice from Mars. From 2013 to 2018, he saw a career resurgence after starring as Fin Shepard in the Sharknado film series. In 2019, he played the DC Comics character Daniel Cassidy/Blue Devil on the series Swamp Thing.

== Early life ==
Ziering was born in Newark, New Jersey, the youngest of three boys of Muriel (1925–1998) and Paul M. Ziering (1921–2008), an educator, orchestra leader, and saxophonist. He grew up in West Orange, New Jersey and has two older brothers, Jeff and Barry. Ziering is Jewish. He graduated from West Orange High School in 1982, and from William Paterson University in 1988.

== Career ==
In 1990, Ziering began his portrayal of the character Steve Sanders on the hit series Beverly Hills, 90210. Sanders was a high school student and friend of Brandon Walsh (Jason Priestley), one of the series' other central characters. He is one of only four series regulars to appear on the show for its entire duration of ten seasons until 2000.

In 1998, Ziering was cast as the voice of Dr. Niko "Nick" Tatopoulos in Godzilla: The Series, which was a direct follow-up to the 1998 film. Ziering replaced Matthew Broderick, who portrayed the character in the film.

In May 2002, Ziering joined the cast of Spider-Man: The New Animated Series, this time a direct follow-up to the 2002 film directed by Sam Raimi. Ziering was the voice of Harry Osborn, replacing James Franco. The series premiered on MTV in 2003, but despite positive reviews, was cancelled due to low ratings.

In 2006, Ziering produced, directed and starred in the short film Man vs. Monday, which won the Audience Choice Award at the 2006 Fort Lauderdale International Film Festival. Also in 2006, he won the Best Actor Award at the 2006 Monaco Film Festival for his portrayal of Francis in the independent film Stripped Down.

Ziering has also appeared in the television series JAG, What I Like About You (reuniting with 90210 costar Jennie Garth), The Doctors, as Erich Aldrich and Guiding Light as Cameron Stewart. He also had a role in the videogame Freelancer as the protagonist, Edison Trent.

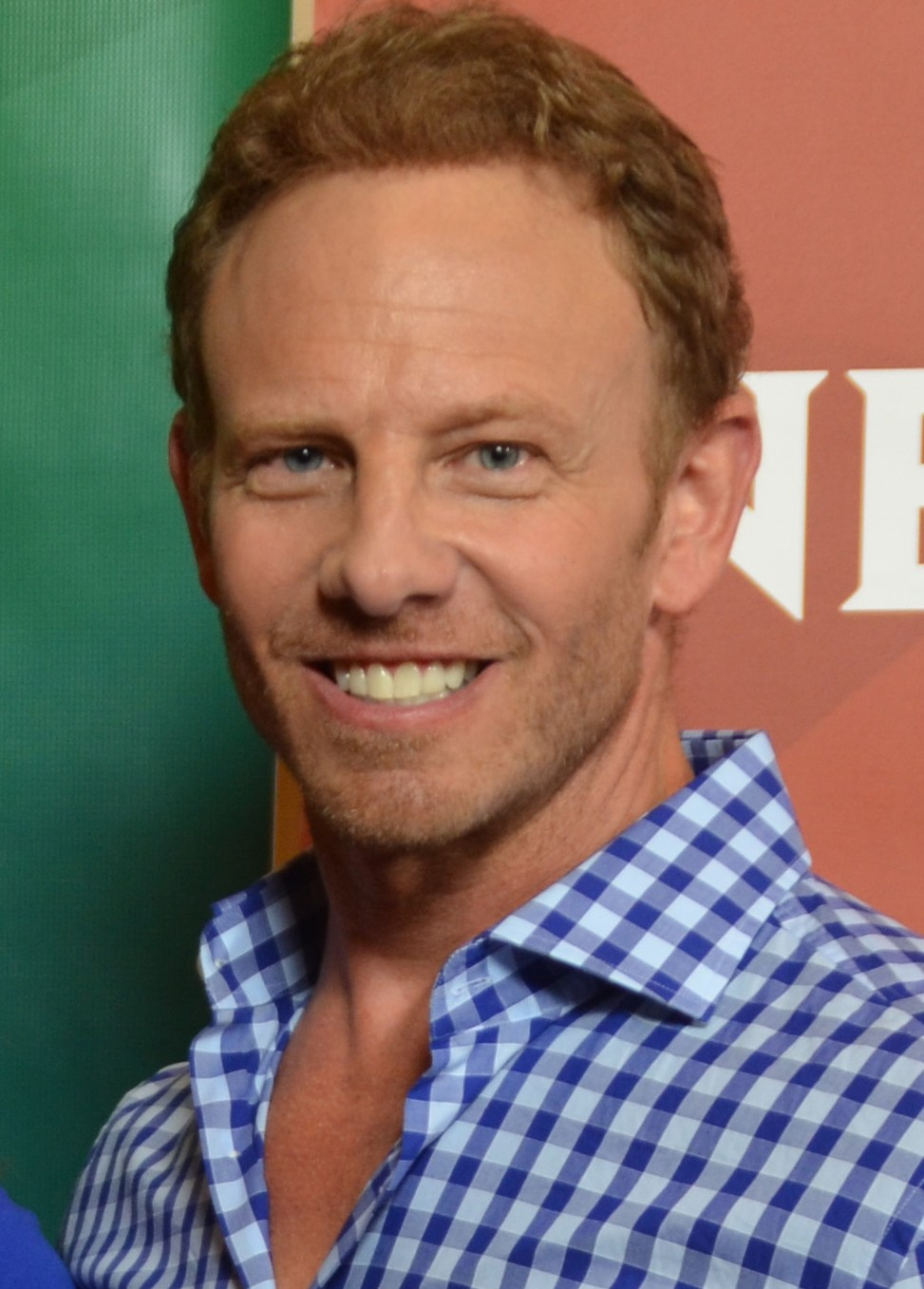
Ziering at NBCUniversal's Summer TCA Tour on July 14, 2014

He was a celebrity dancer in 2007 on Season 4 of Dancing with the Stars. His professional dance partner was Cheryl Burke, who won the competition in Season 2 with partner Drew Lachey and Season 3 with partner Emmitt Smith. Ziering made it to the semi-finals, and received a perfect score (three 10s) from the judges for one of his two dances in the round. However, it was not enough to reach the finals: he and Burke were eliminated during the results show the next day on May 15, 2007. In 2016 Burke said the experience of working with Ziering made her want to "slit her wrists". She later apologized, not to Ziering, but for making a thoughtless reference to suicide. Ziering did not comment publicly on Burke's comments beyond re-tweeting a message from a former co-worker that praised him as a great person to be around.

On June 18, 2007, Variety reported that Ziering had auditioned the previous week for the opportunity to succeed Bob Barker as host of The Price Is Right. The job ultimately went to Drew Carey. Ziering's ex-wife, Nikki, was a model on the show from 1999 to 2002.

In May, 2013, it was announced that Ziering would be performing with Chippendales as a celebrity guest star for four weeks at the Rio All Suite Hotel and Casino in Las Vegas.

In 2015, he appeared on Celebrity Apprentice on NBC. In 2018, he competed on Worst Cooks in America: Celebrity Edition.

In 2019, Ziering was cast as Blue Devil in the DC Universe series Swamp Thing. The show ran for only one season, though it was positively received by critics and audiences.

Also in 2019, Ziering reunited with her original Beverly Hills, 90210 castmates Jennie Garth, Jason Priestley, Shannen Doherty, Gabrielle Carteris, Brian Austin Green, and Tori Spelling for BH90210, which was a six-episode series in which the cast played heightened, fictionalized versions of themselves. The series aired on FOX in August and September 2019 and was canceled after one season.

== Personal life ==
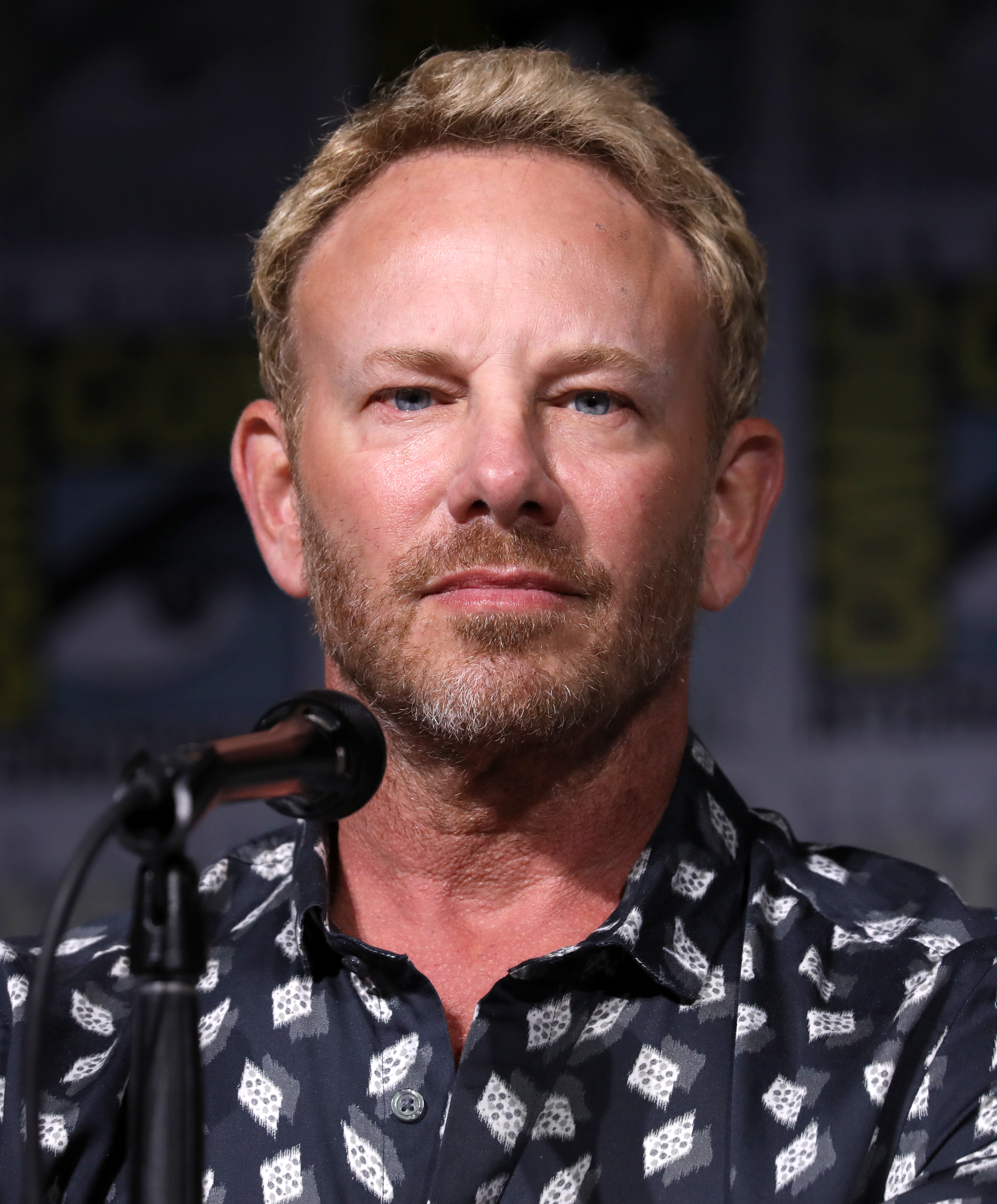
Ziering in 2023

Ziering married Playboy model Nikki Schieler in July 1997. She converted to Judaism before marrying him. They filed for divorce in February 2002, citing irreconcilable differences. Nikki has said that the separation was contentious and she was not given any support or help moving out; a spokesperson for Ziering stated Nikki was "compensated above and beyond the prenup".

On February 3, 2010, Ziering announced his engagement to Erin Ludwig. The couple married at a ceremony in Newport Beach, California, on May 28, 2010. They have two daughters, Mia Loren (b. April 25, 2011) and Penna Mae (b. April 25, 2013). On October 31, 2019, Ziering announced that the couple had separated. The divorce was finalized October 4, 2022.

Ziering was involved in an altercation with a group of mini-bike riders in Los Angeles December 31, 2023. Ziering reported on social media that both he and his daughter, Penna, who was in the car when the group attacked her father, were uninjured.

== Filmography ==
=== Film ===
Year	Title	Role	Notes
1981	Endless Love	Sammy Butterfield	
1995	Savate	Cain Parker	Direct to video
1995	No Way Back	Victor Serlano	
1996	Mighty Ducks the Movie: The First Face-Off	Wildwing Flashblade	Voice, direct to video
2005	Domino	Himself	
2005	Six Months Later	Michael	Short
2006	Stripped Down	Francis	
2006	Man vs. Monday	Dan Smith	Short; also director
2007	Tyrannosaurs Azteca	Cortes	
2009	Step Seven	Richard Miller/Brother Abraham	Short
2011	The Legend of Awesomest Maximus	Testiclees	
2012	That's My Boy	TV version Donny	
2012	McKenna Shoots for the Stars	Mr. Brooks	
2013	Snake and Mongoose	Keith Black	
2014	Christmas in Palm Springs	Teddy	
2016	Killer Deal	Nick Steel	Short; also producer
2017	F the Prom	Ken Reede	
2021	Hunters	General Taylor	Short, Executive Producer

=== Television ===
Year	Title	Role	Notes
1981–1982	The Doctors	Erich Aldrich	2 episodes
1987	Guiding Light	Cameron Stewart	Contract role
1988	ABC Afterschool Specials	Randy Forrester	Episode: "Terrible Things My Mother Told Me"
1990	CBS Schoolbreak Special	Donnie	Episode: "Flour Babies"
1990	Married... with Children	The Kid	Episode: "The Unnatural"
1990–2000	Beverly Hills, 90210	Steve Sanders, Ronnie Robertson	Main role Producer; Director: "I'm Using You 'Cause I Like You"; Writer: "Sentenced to Life" (story by)
1992	Melrose Place	Steve Sanders	3 episodes
1992	Parker Lewis Can't Lose	Himself	Episode: "Geek Tragedy"
1993–1996	Biker Mice from Mars	Vinnie	Voice, main role
1994	Aaahh!!! Real Monsters	Gludge	Voice, episode: "Smile and Say Oblina"
1994	Beverly Hills, 90210: A Christmas Special	Himself	Television film
1995	The Women of Spring Break	George Peck	Television film
1996	Subliminal Seduction	Darrin Danver	Television film
1996–1997	Mighty Ducks	Wildwing Flashblade	Voice, main role
1998	V.I.P.	Peter, Tasha's ex-husband	Episode: "Bloody Val-entine"
1998	All-Star Party for Aaron Spelling	Himself	Television special
1998	78th Annual Miss America Pageant	Himself (Judge)	Television special
1998–1999	Hollywood Squares	Himself (Panelist)	Recurring role
1998–2001	Godzilla: The Series	Dr. Niko Tatopoulos	Voice
1999	Love Boat: The Next Wave	Joshua Krumb	Episode: "Don't Judge a Book by Its Lover"
1999	Batman Beyond	Mason Forrest	Voice, episode: "The Winning Edge"
2000	Twice in a Lifetime	Dr. Steven Weaver/Lance Kensington	Episode: "Even Steven"
2001	Inside Schwartz	Parker	Episode: "Event Night"; uncredited
2001	JAG	Captain William Shepard	Episode: "Ambush"
2001	The Test	Himself (Panelist)	Episode: "The PDA Test"
2002	Son of the Beach	Harry Johnson	3 episodes
2002	What I Like About You	Paul Cody	Episode: "Copy That"
2003	Spider-Man: The New Animated Series	Harry Osborn	Voice
2006–2007	Biker Mice from Mars	Vinnie	Voice
2007	Side Order of Life	Brian Fowler	3 episodes
2007	Drawn Together	Chase Huffington	Voice, episode: "Drawn Together Babies"
2007	Dancing with the Stars	Himself (Contestant)	Season 4
2008	Your Mama Don't Dance	Himself (Host)	
2008	Lava Storm	John Wilson	Television film
2009	The Christmas Hope	Nathan Andrews	Television film
2010	CSI: NY	Thom Weir	Episode: "Pot of Gold"
2010	Elopement	David Drummond	Television film
2011	Happily Divorced	Robert, Support Group Leader	Episode: "Spousal Support"
2013	Sharknado	Fin Shepard	Television film
2013	Deadtime Stories	Mr. Tyler	Episode: "Terror in Tiny Town"
2013	Hell's Kitchen	Himself (Restaurant Patron)	Episode: "9 Chefs Compete"
2013	Shark After Dark	Himself (Guest)	Episode: "Sharkmania!"
2013	Oprah: Where Are They Now?	Himself (Guest)	Episode: "90210 Star Ian Ziering"
2014	Sharknado 2: The Second One	Fin Shepard	Television film
2014	Sproutnado: Synchronized Swimming	Himself – Swimmer	Television film
2014	Sproutnado: So Many Numbers in the Ocean	Himself – Swimmer	Television film
2014	Sproutnado: Shark Costume Delivery	Himself – Movie Star	Television film
2014	Sproutnado: Ocean Weather Report	Weather Reporter	Television film
2014	94th Annual Miss America Pageant	Himself (Judge)	Television special
2014	On Your Marc!	Himself (Guest)	Episode: "Ian Ziering"
2014	The Wil Wheaton Project	Himself (Guest)	Episode: "Wil Master: Axis of Wheaton"
2014	America's Healthiest Heroes	Himself (Host)	
2014–2016	Celebrity Name Game	Himself (Celebrity Player)	Recurring role
2015	Defiance	Conrad Von Bach	Episode: "The Beauty of Our Weapons"
2015	Sharknado 3: Oh Hell No!	Fin Shepard	Television film
2015	Lavalantula	Fin Shepard	Television film
2015	Celebrity Apprentice	Himself (Contestant)	8 episodes
2016	The Muppets	Himself	Episode: "A Tail of Two Piggies"
2016	Hashtaggers	Himself	Episode: "#Colin'sRival with Ian Ziering"
2016	Sharknado: The 4th Awakens	Fin Shepard	Television film; also co-executive producer
2017	Sharknado 5: Global Swarming	Fin Shepard	Television film; also co-executive producer
2017	Battle of the Network Stars	Himself (Contestant)	Episode: "Primetime Soaps vs. ABC Stars"
2018	The Thundermans	Young Thunder Man	Episode: "The Thundredth"
2018	Aussie Girl	Himself	Episode: "Crafty Service"
2018	Worst Cooks in America	Himself (Contestant)	6 episodes
2018	Celebrity Family Feud	Himself (Contestant)	Episode: "Sherri Shepherd vs. Ian Ziering"
2018	The Last Sharknado: It's About Time	Fin Shepard	Television film; also executive producer
2019	Swamp Thing	Dan Cassidy / Blue Devil	Recurring role
2019	Malibu Rescue	Gavin Cross	
2019	Malibu Rescue	Gavin Cross	Recurring role
2019	BH90210	Himself/Steve Sanders	Co-producer
2019	Zombie Tidal Wave	Hunter Shaw	Television film; also writer and producer
2020	The Order	Himself	Episode: "Spring Outbreak"
2021	The Other Two	Himself	Episode: "Chase Guest-Edits Vogue"
2023	Clone High	Himself	Voice
2026	Danse avec les stars	Himself (Contestant)	Season 15

=== Video games ===
Year	Title	Role	Notes
2003	Freelancer	Edison Trent	Microsoft Game Studios
2006	Biker Mice from Mars	Vinnie	PlayStation 2 and Nintendo DS

== Dancing with the Stars season 4 ==
Week #	Dance / Song	Judges' Score			Result
Week #	Dance / Song	Inaba	Goodman	Tonioli	Result
1	Cha-Cha-Cha / "Mony Mony"	7	7	7	No Elimination
2	Quickstep / "Don't Get Me Wrong"	7	8	7	Safe
3	Jive / "Hard Headed Woman"	8	8	8	Safe
4	Waltz / "He Was Beautiful"	7	9	8	Safe
5	Samba / "Dance Like This"	8	8	8	Safe
6	Pasodoble / "Waiting for Tonight"	8	8	8	Safe
6	Swing / "Rock This Town"	No scores given			Safe
7	Tango / "Holding Out for a Hero"	9	9	9	Safe
7	Mambo / "Gimme the Light"	9	9	9	Safe
8	Foxtrot / "Baby, It's Cold Outside"	8	7	7	Safe
8	Rumba / "Imagine"	8	8	9	Safe
9 Semi-finals	Tango / "Maneater"	9	10	9	Eliminated
9 Semi-finals	Jive / "All Shook Up"	10	10	10	Eliminated
