= Yanet García =

Mexican weather presenter and nude model

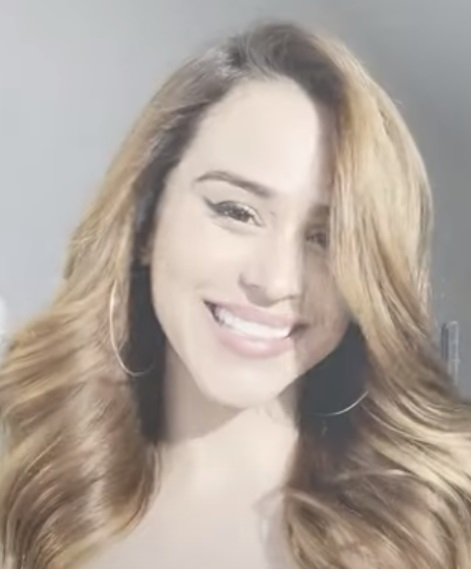
- Yanet García in 2021
- Born: November 14, 1990 (age 35); Monterrey, Nuevo León, Mexico
- Other name: The Mexican Weather Girl
- Years active: 2010–present
- Modeling information
- Height: 5 ft 6 in (1.68 m)
- Hair color: Brown
- Eye color: Hazel

Yanet García (born November 14, 1990), also known as La Chica del Clima ("The Mexican Weather Girl"), is a Mexican erotic model, actress, influencer, OnlyFans creator and weather presenter. She is known for having been the first model to appear on the cover of the first Mexican edition of the adult magazine Penthouse.

== Early life ==
Yanet García studied public accounting and became certified as a health nutritional coach at the Institute for Integrative Nutrition in New York, attending nutrition conferences at Harvard University.

== Career ==
At age 20, García opened her own professional modeling academy, Yanet García Models, in Santiago, Nuevo León. In 2013 she participated in the casting of the contest Nuestra Belleza Nuevo León. She debuted as a weather presenter in 2014 in the program Las Noticias of Televisa Monterrey, and in 2015 she began to be in charge of the weather section of the program Gente Regia, where she rose to fame. On June 21 of the same year, one of her segments of her weather forecast went viral on the internet, which made her known throughout the world. Later, she posed for the H for Men magazine for the month of October.

In 2017, the magazine FHM magazine chose García as one of the hundred most beautiful women in the world. That same year, she made her acting debut in the movie Sharknado 5: Global Swarming. In 2018, she joined the Televisa program Hoy and, that year, she posed for the international magazine Maxim for the month of July.

In 2019 she starred in the film Bellezonismo. In 2020, she debuted on the television network Univision.

In 2021 she opened her account on OnlyFans, which attracted approximately five hundred thousand followers.

== Philanthropy ==
In 2018, Garcia began hosting Teletón Mexico. In 2019, she joined an initiative to reduce the use of plastics and combat the deterioration of the environment. In 2020, she launched a campaign to provide an economic incentive to ten families and help them mitigate the impact on their income due to the COVID-19 pandemic.

== Filmography ==
- Sharknado 5: Global Swarming (2017) - Chara
- Bellezonismo (2019) - Miss

== Awards ==
- Recognition as Healthy Influencer of the Year, awarded by Socialiteen magazine, 2021.
