= Tara Reid =

American actress (born 1975)

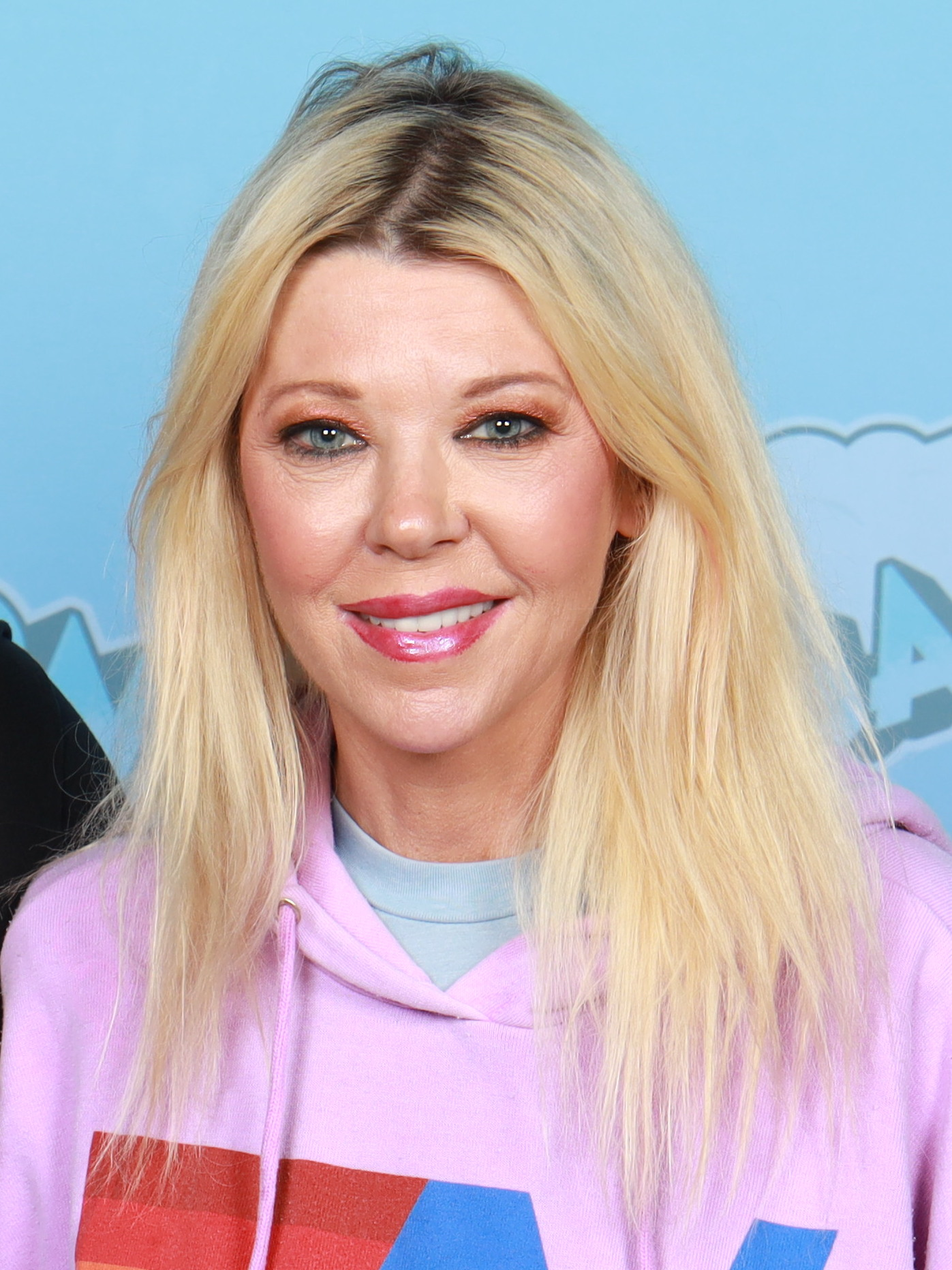
- Reid in 2025
- Born: Tara Donna Reid; November 8, 1975 (age 50); Wyckoff, New Jersey, U.S.
- Occupation: Actress
- Years active: 1982–present

Tara Donna Reid (/riːd/; born November 8, 1975) is an American actress. Her film roles established her status as a sex symbol in the late 1990s and early 2000s.

In film, Reid was the lead ensemble role as Vicky Lathum in the American Pie film series (1999–2001; 2012). Her other notable lead film roles include Urban Legend (1998), Body Shots (1999), Josie and the Pussycats (2001), Van Wilder (2002), My Boss's Daughter (2003) and Alone in the Dark (2005). She had supporting roles in the films The Big Lebowski (1998), Cruel Intentions (1999), Dr. T & the Women (2000), and Just Visiting (2001).

In television, Reid had recurring roles as Ashley on the soap opera Days of Our Lives (1995) and Danni Sullivan on the NBC series Scrubs (2003–2005). She had a co-lead role as April Wexler in the Sharknado television film series (2013–2018). Reid hosted her own reality series on E!, titled Taradise (2005–2006).

== Early life ==
Reid was born on November 8, 1975, and raised in Wyckoff, New Jersey, the daughter of Donna Reid (née Russo; 1947–2018) and Thomas Reid (1941–2016), both of whom were teachers and day-care center owners. Her father also worked on Wall Street. She is of mainly Irish descent with some Scottish, Italian, French, Hungarian, and English descent. Reid has twin younger siblings, Colleen and Patrick, and another brother, Tom.

She attended Professional Children's School in Manhattan.

== Career ==
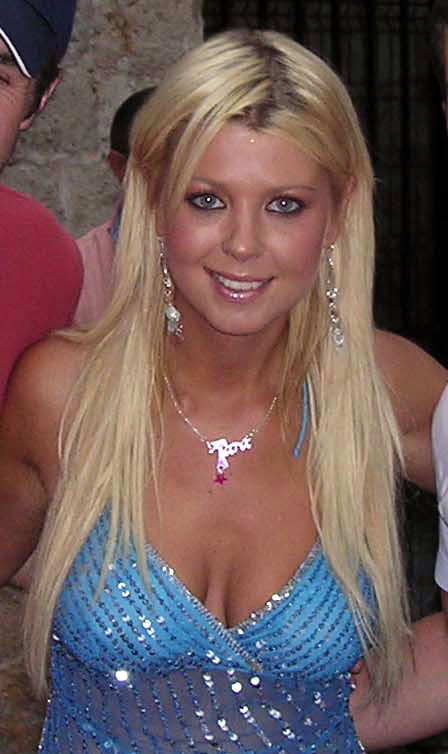
Reid in 2005

Reid began acting at age six. She appeared in the game show Child's Play and appeared in commercials for Jell-O, McDonald's, Crayola, and Milton Bradley. As a teenager, she was on Saved by the Bell: The New Class.

After moving to Hollywood in 1997, Reid transitioned to movies, landing a role in 1998's The Big Lebowski. Though the film disappointed at the box office, grossing only $17 million in the United States, it became a cult film. Later that same year, she appeared in a larger role in a more financially successful film, Urban Legend, where she portrayed a sexy radio host and which grossed just under $40 million in the United States and led to two sequels, though neither included Reid. In 1999, she appeared in a tiny role in Cruel Intentions. Reid achieved mainstream success when she portrayed the role of the virginal Vickie in American Pie (1999), which grossed over $100 million in the United States. The film also marked her first film to reach number one at the box office. In 2001, she reprised the role in American Pie 2, which opened to $45 million and grossed over $145 million in the United States, almost 50% more than its predecessor. Reid did not return for American Wedding (2003), but did reprise the character in the fourth theatrical film in the series, American Reunion (2012).

Following the success of American Pie 2, Reid starred in several commercial and critical misfires, including Josie and the Pussycats and Van Wilder. She also starred as the youngest daughter of a Texas gynecologist in Robert Altman's Dr. T & the Women, alongside Richard Gere. She returned to the small screen as a recurring character on the NBC sitcom Scrubs, appearing in 11 episodes of season three. Shortly thereafter, she appeared alongside Ashton Kutcher in My Boss's Daughter, for which she was nominated for both Worst Supporting Actress and Worst Screen Couple at the 2004 Golden Raspberry Awards.

In 2005, she co-starred in infamous German filmmaker Uwe Boll's Alone in the Dark with Christian Slater. Her mispronunciation of "Newfoundland" became a popular Internet catchphrase. The film was panned by critics and Reid received a Razzie Award nomination for Worst Actress. Reid signed on to host the E!'s Wild On Tara Reid (later renamed Taradise), a program that showcased high-society vacations and hot spots. The show premiered on August 10, 2005, but it was cancelled in September, with Ted Harbert, E! Network's president, saying it was "incredibly difficult to produce with someone well-known."

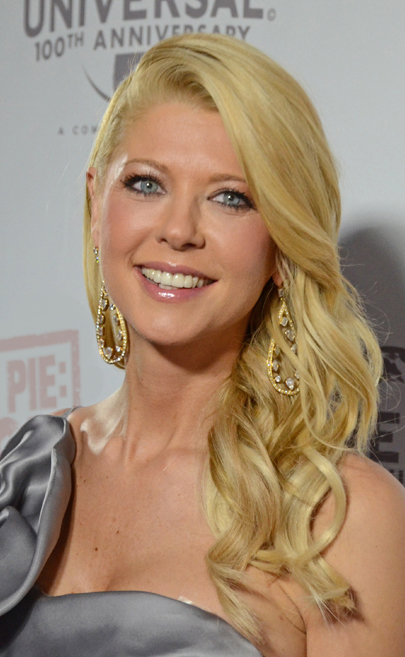
Reid at the premiere of American Reunion in Melbourne in 2012

In January 2007, Reid filmed a commercial with Daniel Conn for Dodo, an Australian budget telephone and internet service provider. Between 2007 and 2008, she starred in several direct-to-video films, including 7-10 Split/Strike, If I Had Known I Was a Genius (which was released at the 2007 Sundance Film Festival), and Clean Break/Unnatural Causes. She also played the main character in the television film Vipers. In 2010, she landed the role of Bonnie in the thriller film The Fields, which was released in 2011. In March 2011, she filmed a Funny or Die spoof trailer for The Big Lebowski 2.

On August 18, 2011, Reid was the second housemate to enter the British reality series Celebrity Big Brother 8. On September 2, she received the fewest votes and became the third celebrity to be evicted from the house.

In October 2011, Reid appeared in Jedward's music video for "Wow Oh Wow". In 2014, she appeared in their music video for "Ferocious".

In 2013, she appeared in the hit Syfy film Sharknado which spawned five sequels in 2014, 2015, 2016, 2017, and 2018. Other projects Reid appeared in during the mid-2010s included comedy spoof The Hungover Games, horror film Charlie's Farm, the Bollywood film Tie the Knot, and the television series The Big Big Show with Andrew Dice Clay and Tom Green.

In 2019, Reid guest-starred as herself in an episode of The Boys where she attended a comic convention with Billy Zane.

In 2023, she appeared in 2 episodes of Special Forces: World's Toughest Test.

In November 2025, Reid said she was drugged at a Rosemont, Illinois bar, local Police say "surveillance footage shows no evidence of anyone tampering with Tara Reid’s drink at the Rosemont DoubleTree hotel bar," noting a bartender covered her drink as standard procedure.

== Other ventures ==
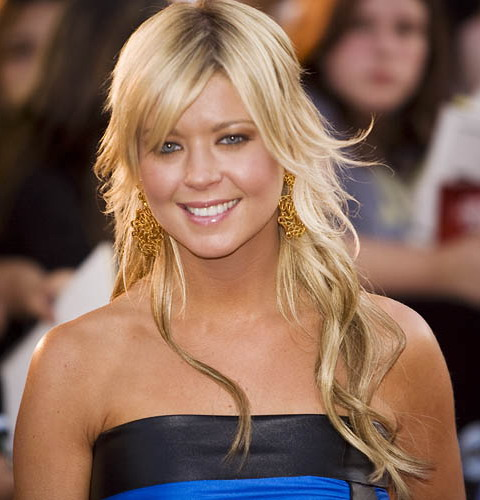
Reid at the 2007 MuchMusic Video Awards

Reid has appeared on the cover of magazines including CosmoGirl, Rolling Stone, Seventeen, Maxim, Playboy, Stuff, and FHM.

In 2007, Reid was invested in three restaurants (Bella, Geisha House, and The Shore) and opened Ketchup, a fast-food restaurant based in Los Angeles.

Reid and Ed Hardy designer Christian Audigier designed Mantra, a clothing line that hit high-end department stores in 2009. In 2014, she released a new swimwear line and a perfume, Shark by Tara, inspired by the film franchise Sharknado.

== Personal life ==
Reid has never married and has no children, which she says negatively affected her career. She froze her eggs in 2021.

In March 2000, Reid met Carson Daly on the set of Total Request Live and they began dating. They shared an apartment in New York City and Daly proposed on October 29, 2000. In June 2001, Reid and Daly broke off their engagement.

On January 18, 2010, Reid's then-boyfriend, Michael Axtmann, an Internet entrepreneur from Nuremberg, proposed to her at The Little Door restaurant in Los Angeles. The couple had reportedly planned an intimate ceremony for summer 2010. On April 20, it was reported that the wedding had been called off and the relationship had ended.

In November 2010, Reid began dating Danish businessman Michael Lillelund. Reid's spokesman reported that she and Lillelund had married the day before in Greece. Lillelund denied it, saying he had not been in contact with Reid in months.

In August 2011, Reid publicized that she had married Bulgarian financier Zachary Kehayov. In October of that year, she announced that they were not legally married.

Between 2013 and 2014, Reid was dating Israeli musician Erez Eisen from the band Infected Mushroom.

In 2015, she dated Aaron Kaufman; he was fired as an executive of Blue Shield of California and sued by the company after he allegedly spent $100,000 of personal expenses, including trips with Reid, on his company credit card.

In 2016, Reid and actor Dean May participated in Marriage Boot Camp, but were rejected when they were revealed not to be in a relationship.

In September 2019, she began dating Nathan Montpetit-Howar, a music producer.

== Filmography ==
=== Film ===
Year	Title	Role	Notes	Ref.
1987	A Return to Salem's Lot	Amanda		
1998	The Big Lebowski	Bunny Lebowski		
1998	Girl	Cybil Grimes		
1998	I Woke Up Early the Day I Died	Prom Queen / Nightclub Bartender		
1998	Urban Legend	Sasha Thomas		
1999	What We Did That Night	The Girl		
1999	Cruel Intentions	Marci Greenbaum		
1999	Around the Fire	Jennifer		
1999	American Pie	Victoria "Vicky" Lathum		
1999	Body Shots	Sara Olswang		
2000	Dr. T & the Women	Connie Travis		
2001	Just Visiting	Angelique		
2001	Josie and the Pussycats	Melody Valentine		
2001	American Pie 2	Victoria "Vicky" Lathum		
2002	Van Wilder	Gwen Pearson		
2003	Devil's Pond	Julianne		
2003	My Boss's Daughter	Lisa Taylor		
2005	Alone in the Dark	Aline Cedrac		
2005	The Crow: Wicked Prayer	Lola Bryne		
2005	Silent Partner	Dina Nevskaya		
2006	Incubus	Jay		
2007	If I Had Known I Was a Genius	Stephanie		
2007	7-10 Split/Strike	Lindsay / Lil Reno		
2008	Senior Skip Day	Ellen Harris		
2008	Vipers	Nicky Swift		
2008	Clean Break/Unnatural Causes	Julia McKay		
2011	The Big Lebowski 2	The Dude, Walter, Donnie, The Big Lebowski	Short film	
2011	The Fields	Bonnie		
2012	American Reunion	Victoria "Vicky" Lathum		
2012	Last Call	Lindsay		
2014	The Hungover Games	Effing White		
2014	Charlie's Farm	Natasha		
2016	Tie the Knot	Beatrice		
2017	Party Bus to Hell	Darby		
2018	United Colors of Bennett Song	Stevie Hawkins-White		
2018	Worthless	Talia Medici		
2018	Ouija House	Young Katherine		
2018	Christmas Manger	Laura		
2018	Andy the Talking Hedgehog	Fairy BFF		
2019	American Christmas	Penny		
2019	Art of the Dead	Tess Barryman		
2020	Attack of the Unknown	Elizabeth		
2020	Baby Bulldog	Dr Robertson		
2020	5th Borough	Sophia Lehoux		
2021	Memoirs of a Fighter	Amber		
2021	Attraction to Paris	Elizabeth		
2021	Mummy Dearest	Angel		
2022	Sally Floss: Digital Detective	Michelle		
2022	Bleach	Maria		
2023	Of Things Past	Kiki		
2023	Bloodthirst	Vampire Queen		
2025	Dr. Quarantine	Dr. Quarantine		
2026	The Dreamer Cinderella	Jenna		
TBA	Air Force Z	President Olivia Wallace		
TBA	Chicken Head	Sandy Banks		

=== Television ===
Year	Title	Role	Notes
1994	Saved by the Bell: The New Class	Sandy	Episode: "Squash It"
1995	Days of Our Lives	Ashley	5 episodes
1996	California Dreams	Sarah	Episode: "Graduation Day"
2000	G vs E	Luis' Roommate	Episode: " Underworld"
2003–2005	Scrubs	Danni Sullivan	Recurring role (season 3); special guest (season 4); 11 episodes
2004	Quintuplets	Ms. Foley	Episode: "Teacher's Pet"
2004	Knots	Emily	Television film
2005	Hitched	Theresa	Television film
2005–2006	Taradise	Herself	own Reality series
2007	Wild 'n Out	Herself	1 episode
2008	Vipers	Nicky Swift	Television film
2011	Celebrity Big Brother 8 (UK)	Herself	Reality series
2013	Fashion Police	Herself	Guest
2013	Lemon La Vida Loca	Herself	Mockumentary
2013	Tosh.0	Herself	Season 5 Worst Impressionist's web redemption
2013	Sharknado	April Wexler	Television film
2014	Sharknado 2: The Second One	April Wexler	Television film
2015	Sharknado 3: Oh Hell No!	April Wexler	Television film
2016	Marriage Boot Camp: Reality Stars	Herself	Reality series
2016	Sharknado: The 4th Awakens	April Wexler	Television film
2017	Hell's Kitchen	Herself	Chef's table guest; Episode: "Tequila Shots?"
2017	Sharknado 5: Global Swarming	April Wexler	Television film
2017	Then and Now with Andy Cohen	Herself	1 episode
2017	Trailer Park Shark	Billie Jean	Television film
2017	A Royal Christmas Ball	Allison	Television film
2018	The Last Sharknado: It's About Time	April Wexler	Television film
2019	The Boys	Herself	Episode: "The Innocents"
2019	2nd Chance for Christmas	Monica Love	Television film
2020	The Wrong Cheerleader Coach	Coach Hughes	Television film
2023	Ghosts	Herself	1 episode
2023	Special Forces: World's Toughest Test	Herself	2 episodes

== Awards and nominations ==
Year	Award	Category	Nominated work	Result	Ref.
2000	Young Hollywood Awards	Best Ensemble Cast	American Pie	Won	
2001	Teen Choice Awards	Choice Female Hottie	—N/a	Nominated	
2004	Golden Raspberry Awards	Worst Supporting Actress	My Boss's Daughter	Nominated	
2004	Golden Raspberry Awards	Worst Screen Couple (shared w/ Ashton Kutcher)	My Boss's Daughter	Nominated	
2006	Golden Raspberry Awards	Worst Actress	Alone in the Dark	Nominated	
2025	Chandler International Film Festival	Best Actress	Dr. Quarantine	Won	
2025	Chandler International Film Festival	Spotlight Award	—N/a (Note: The award was given to Reid for "significant contributions to the film industry".)	Won	
2025	Hollywood Reel Independent Film Festival	Best Actress	Dr. Quarantine	Won	
