= The Last Sharknado: It's About Time =

2018 film by Anthony C. Ferrante

- Promotional release poster
- Written by: Scotty Mullen
- Directed by: Anthony C. Ferrante
- Starring: Ian Ziering; Tara Reid; Cassie Scerbo; Judah Friedlander; Vivica A. Fox
- Music by: Christopher Cano; Chris Ridenhour
- Country of origin: United States
- Original language: English

Production
- Producer: David Michael Latt
- Cinematography: Pătru Păunescu
- Editor: Ryan Mitchelle
- Running time: 90 minutes
- Production companies: The Asylum; Syfy Films
- Budget: US$3 million

Original release
- Network: Syfy
- Release: August 19, 2018

Related
- Sharknado 5: Global Swarming (2017); 2025 Armageddon (2022)

The Last Sharknado: It's About Time is a 2018 American made-for-television science fiction comedy disaster film and the eighth installment in the Sharknado film franchise. The film was directed by Anthony C. Ferrante with Ian Ziering, Tara Reid and Cassie Scerbo reprising their roles from the previous installments. In the film, Fin and his gang use time travel in order to prevent sharknadoes from ever happening. A prequel is in development.

== Plot ==
With the Earth completely devastated from the global sharknado swarm, (Note: As depicted in Sharknado 5: Global Swarming (2017)) Fin Shepard and his adult son Gil time travel to the Cretaceous period in a bid to change the future and undo the destruction. Gil vanishes upon arrival, and a hologram he recorded earlier reveals that due to the instability of the energy needed to time travel, any individual person can only travel back in time once, with any subsequent trips back erasing their existence. Fin joins forces with his friends Nova and Bryan, as well as the still-human version of his wife April, all of whom were saved from their original deaths (Note: As depicted in Sharknado 5: Global Swarming (2017), Sharknado 2: The Second One (2014), and Sharknado 3: Oh Hell No! (2015), respectively) by Gil and sent back to await Fin's arrival. The group destroy the sharknado that appears with the help of a pterodactylus tamed by April, and use a time capacitor built into Gil's flight badge to return home, believing they have erased the sharknadoes from history.

However, the time vortex instead leads to medieval Camelot, with Bryan turning into a woman due to a temporal alteration. They meet Merlin, who reveals he has been helping the past version of Gil research a way to use sharknadoes for time travel; as a consequence of Gil searching for his parents throughout time, the sharknadoes have been unleashed across history. A sharknado forms and heads to the castle, but Fin destroys it with Excalibur after the past Gil uses it to time jump. The group's next jump leads to the American Revolutionary War, where they destroy a sharknado with aid from George Washington and Benjamin Franklin. Bryan, who returned to his original form after leaving Camelot, chooses to stay behind as Fin, Nova and April continue their quest.

The trio use a stagecoach to make the next leap, which brings them to the Old West town of Santa Mira. Their arrival allows Billy the Kid to escape arrest by the local sheriff, who detains Fin as an accomplice to Billy's crimes. This threatens to cause a catastrophic shift in the timeline, as Billy was meant to break Gil out of prison so he could reach the next sharknado. Nova and April meet up with Fin's ex-girlfriend Skye, who was also saved from her original death (Note: as depicted in Sharknado 2: The Second One (2014)) by Gil and sent back to await the others in Santa Mira. Together, they rescue Fin and Gil and allow the latter to make his time jump in the sharknado before destroying it with the eye lasers of April's robot counterpart's head from the previous timeline.

The group next travel to a 1950s beach party beset by a sharknado, which they destroy with aid from younger versions of Fin's parents Gilbert and Raye. They acquire a prototype time capacitor from the pair and attempt to go to July 11, 2013, to stop the Los Angeles sharknado, (Note: as depicted in Sharknado (2013)) but Nova sabotages the capacitor to lead them to 1997 instead. She hopes to save her grandfather from dying in the shark attack that traumatized her as a child and successfully does so despite Fin's warnings, but ends up getting herself and April killed instead, while Robot April's head is lost in the ocean.

Fin and Skye attempt another jump to 2013, but they end up in an alternate timeline that takes them to the year 20013, where the robot April has conquered a ruined world with MechaSharks and an army of clones.

Robot April explains that after her head was found by a fishing boat, she felt abandoned and spent the next 20,000 years creating a Time Vortex powered by the stabilized energy of the Sharknado, which she could use to force Fin into her future so they could be together forever.

She freezes Skye and tempts Fin with clones of his children and Nova, but Fin refuses.

A human April from another timeline—whom Robot April preserved as a genetic base for the clones—awakens and fights her hand-to-hand, buying Fin enough time to use the Time Vortex.

Fin arrives in 2013 and lands on Captain Santiago's shark-hunting boat just as the first sharknado forms. He discovers that Santiago found Robot April's head and intervenes to prevent her from turning evil; he then helps the captain battle the sharknado. Robot April's future self arrives and attempts to steal Fin's capacitor, and their struggle damages the device, releasing a pulse that tears reality. Time begins collapsing, creating a “timenado” that transcended space-time and began destroying the universe throughout history, finding themselves in an apparent void. Robot April helps Fin, who was beyond time and immersed, observing points being torn apart, to destroy her future self, and he activates her nuclear failsafe, sacrificing their lives to destroy the sharknado and repair time, thus creating a new universe.

In the new, sharknado-free timeline, all of the Shepard family and friends are alive. Fin and April run the bar with Nova, who now likes sharks, while April is pregnant with Gil. A television commercial reveals that Skye has become a politician and is a leading presidential candidate. Fin's daughter Claudia delivers Fin a letter from his father, who is in space and has sent his flight insignia as a gift for Gil's birth. Fin, who plans to retire to Kansas with April and Gil, delivers an emotional farewell speech to his friends and family. April goes into labor, and everyone rushes out of the bar to head to the hospital. As they leave, the television plays a broadcast of The Today Show with Al Roker reporting that there are no clouds in the sky at all, an occurrence that will likely never happen again.

== Cast ==
=== Principal cast ===
- Ian Ziering as Fin Shepard
- Tara Reid as April Wexler
- Cassie Scerbo as Nova Clarke
- Judah Friedlander as Bryan
- Vivica A. Fox as Skye

=== Supporting cast ===
Prehistoric

- Brendan Petrizzo as Hologram Gil
- M. Steven Felty as Voice of Hologram Gil
- Matie Moncea as Gil On Dinosaur
- T-Rex (Todd Rex) as T-Rex Operator

Camelot

- Debra Wilson as New Bryan
- Neil deGrasse Tyson as Merlin
- Alaska as Morgana
- Marina Sirtis as Winter
- Audrey Latt and Ana Maria Varty Mihail as Maidens
- Tiberiu Hansan as Medieval Gil
- Andrew Olteanu as Frodo

Revolutionary War

- Leslie Jordan as Benjamin Franklin
- Darrell Hammond as George Washington
- Ben Stein as Alexander Hamilton
- Roy Taylor as Jebediah Clarke
- Constantin Viscreanu as Paul Revere
- Dexter Holland as British Captain
- Ian Ridenhour, Kathrine Ridenhour and Chris Ridenhour as Townspeople

Old West

- Jonathan Bennett as Billy the Kid
- Dee Snider as Sheriff
- Chris Owen as 30-Year-Old Gil
- James Murray as Eastwood
- Kim Little as Cowgirl
- Brady Latt, Moise Latt, Aiden Cano and Zachary Cano as Cowboys

1950s

- Gilbert Gottfried as Rand McDonald, Ron McDonald's father
- Tori Spelling as Raye Martin
- Dean McDermott as Gilly Shepard
- Benjy Bronk as Connor Beale
- Robbie Rist as Quint Guitarist
- Anthony C. Ferrante as Quint Singer
- Joel Valder as Quint Drummer
- Thom Bowyer as Quint Bassist
- Raine Michaels as Yellow Polka Dot Bikini Girl
- Bob Ellis as Surfer Gil
- Erin Ziering as Beach Mom
- Mia Ziering and Penna Ziering as Beach Kids
- Ronanna Bina, Kacie Flower, Courtney Quod, Brandon Quod, Nick Grothe, Tammy Klein, Anna Rasmussen and Ana Florit as 1950s Dancers

1997

- Christopher Knight as Grandpa Clarke
- Catarina Scerbo as Jenny Lynn "Nova" Clarke
- Bernie Kopell as Charter Boat Captain
- Juliana Ferrante as Juliana
- Emma Neal as Emma

Smuggler's Ship

- Israel Sáez de Miguel as Captain Carlos Santiago
- Marcus Choi as Palmer
- Alexandre Ottoni de Menezes (credited as Jovem Nerd) as Azzinaro

Timenado

- La Toya Jackson as Cleopatra
- James Hong as Confucius
- Eileen Davidson as Marie Antoinette
- Shad Gaspard as Muhammad Ali
- Jayson Paul as Joe Louis
- Kato Kaelin as Viking King
- Patrick Labyorteaux as Julius Caesar
- Julia LaJuett as Amelia Earhart
- Paul Logan as Egyptian Guard
- Sharon Desiree as Joan of Arc
- M. Steven Felty as D. Brown

Bar

- Al Roker as Himself
- Petunia as Herself
- Thunder Levin as Bar Patron

Guest stars
20013

- Chuck Hittinger as Matt Shepard
- Ryan Newman as Claudia Shepard

Bar

- Gary Busey as Wilford Wexler
- Bo Derek as May Wexler
- Mark McGrath as Martin Brody
- Masiela Lusha as Gemini
- John Heard as George (archive footage)

== Production ==
In February 2018, the film was confirmed to be released that summer to follow upon Sharknado 5's premiere, Tara Reid, Ian Ziering and Cassie Scerbo were set to return. On March 28, 2018, Syfy confirmed the film will be the final installment of the series.

On May 25, the film's title, The Last Sharknado: It's About Time was revealed by a teaser trailer. A 30-second trailer was released on August 2. Vivica A. Fox, who had starred in Sharknado 2, also returned for the final installment.

Several other actors reprised their roles in cameos for the final scene of the movie, including Chuck Hittinger reappearing as Matt Shepard, replacing Cody Linley who had portrayed Matt in the fourth and fifth movies. Archival footage of John Heard, who portrayed George in the original film, was also used in tribute to the actor, who had died in July 2017.

== Reception ==
On Metacritic, the film has a score of 22 out of 100 based on reviews from 5 critics, indicating "generally unfavorable reviews". On Rotten Tomatoes it has a score of 27% based on reviews from 11 critics.

== Prequel ==
In November 2025, a prequel titled Sharknado Origins was announced to be in development. The film is planned for a Summer 2026 release and will follow Fin and April encountering a Sharknado as teenagers.
