= Sharknado =

2013 film by Anthony C. Ferrante

- Promotional release poster
- Written by: Thunder Levin
- Directed by: Anthony C. Ferrante
- Starring: Tara Reid; Cassie Scerbo; Jaason Simmons; John Heard; Ian Ziering
- Theme music composer: Ramin Kousha
- Composer: Ramin Kousha
- Country of origin: United States
- Original language: English

Production
- Producer: David Michael Latt
- Cinematography: Ben Demaree
- Editor: William Boodell
- Running time: 85 minutes
- Production companies: The Asylum; Syfy Films
- Budget: $2 million

Original release
- Network: Syfy
- Release: July 11, 2013

Related
- Sharknado 2: The Second One (2014)

Sharknado is a 2013 American made-for-television science fiction comedy disaster film directed by Anthony C. Ferrante. It tells about a waterspout that lifts sharks out of the ocean and deposits them in Los Angeles. It is the first installment in the Sharknado film series. The movie first aired on the Syfy channel on July 11, 2013, and stars Tara Reid, Ian Ziering, and John Heard. It was also given a one-night-only special midnight theatrical screening via Regal Cinemas and Fathom Events, where it earned $200,000 from 200 screenings. The over-the-top premise and theatrics of the film quickly earned it a cult following.

The film spawned a franchise of the same name; five sequels have been produced (Sharknado 2: The Second One, Sharknado 3: Oh Hell No!, Sharknado: The 4th Awakens, Sharknado 5: Global Swarming, and The Last Sharknado: It's About Time), as well as three spin-off films (Lavalantula, Sharknado: Heart of Sharkness, and 2 Lava 2 Lantula) and a crossover film (2025 Armageddon).

== Plot ==
Off the coast of Mexico, the ship of shark fin smuggler Captain Carlos Santiago is caught in a hurricane, interrupting his meeting with a potential buyer. A firefight ensues between the buyer and the Santiago before a tornado throws shoals of sharks onto the boat, killing all aboard.

The hurricane soon hits Los Angeles, flooding the city with shark-infested seawater. Bar owner and professional surfer Fin sets out with his friends, Baz, Nova, and George, to rescue his estranged wife, April, and their teenage daughter, Claudia, after the bar and boardwalk are destroyed by the flooding. While heading to April's home, the group stops on a freeway to save people and exactly one dog as flooding causes sharks to attack. George is killed by a shark and the group learns of a tornado warning. They arrive at April's house just before the first floor is flooded and shark-infested. Collin, April's boyfriend, is eaten by sharks, but the rest of the group escapes unharmed from the house, which gets flooded causing it to collapse.

As they travel, the group comes across a school bus trapped in the floodwaters and surrounded by sharks. Fin stops, at the protest of his wife, to save the children and bus driver by rappelling down to the bus from a bridge. Afterward, the bus driver is killed by the letter H in the Hollywood Sign. While Nova is driving the car, a shark lands on top of the car and rips the roof off. Fin's hand is cut. The group abandons the car before it explodes. They steal another car and meet Fin and April's son Matt, a helicopter pilot, who is found taking shelter at his flight school. Three tornadoes develop and absorb the floodwater, turning into shark-filled "sharknados". The group borrow equipment from nearby storage and Matt and Nova bond over Nova surviving a shark attack as a girl and the enormous scar on Matt's chest he got falling off a slide when he was a toddler. Matt and Nova decide to stop the threat of the incoming sharknados by tossing bombs into them from a helicopter. Two are destroyed, but they are unable to stop the third one.

As Nova fights off a shark that had latched onto the helicopter, she falls out of the helicopter and directly into another shark's mouth. Matt is heartbroken. Baz is also lost in the storm along with Matt's friends Bobby and Luellyn. Ultimately, Fin destroys the last sharknado with a bomb attached to his car and the sharks begin to plummet toward the ground. One falling shark flies toward the remaining members of the group. Fin jumps directly into its mouth with a chainsaw and cuts his way out. He emerges carrying an unconscious but otherwise unharmed Nova. Matt is reunited with Nova, and Fin gets back together with April.

== Cast ==
- Ian Ziering as Fin "Finley" Shepard, an ex-surfer who owns a bar.
- John Heard as George, a drunk man who spends all his time at Fin’s bar.
- Tara Reid as April Wexler, Fin's former wife.
- Cassie Scerbo as Nova Clarke, a barmaid who works for Fin.
- Jaason Simmons as Baz Hogan, Fin's right-hand man.
- Aubrey Peeples as Claudia, April and Fin's daughter who feels left out.
- Chuck Hittinger as Matt, Fin and April's son in flight school.
- Christopher Wolfe as Collin, April's boyfriend.
- Robbie Rist as Robbie, a bus driver.
- Eileen Anderson, Frankie Mellor, Hannah Johnson, Ryan Ainsley and Timo de Jong and Laura Welford as school kids on the bus.
- Alex Arleo as Bobby, one of Matt's friends in flight school.
- Connor Weil as Luellyn, one of Matt's friends in flight school.
- Julie McCullough as Jonni Waves, a news reporter.
- Adrian Bustamante as Kelso, a lifeguard.
- Israel Sáez de Miguel as Captain Carlos Santiago, a fishing boat captain.
- Marcus Choi as Palmer, a businessman attempting to make a shady deal with Captain Santiago.

== Production ==
Sharknado was directed for film studio The Asylum by Anthony C. Ferrante, whose previous directing credits include the horror film Boo, and written by Thunder Levin, whose previous writing credits include the film Mutant Vampire Zombies from the 'Hood!. The film's tagline is "Enough said!" Sharknado is one of many B-movies commissioned by Syfy. Robbie Rist said in an interview that he came upon the film's poster at the American Film Market and became enthusiastic about the concept. When his friend Ferrante said that he had been approached to direct the film, Rist insisted that Ferrante take the job. Rist was given a small role in the film and composed the theme.

Actress Tara Reid said of the film, "It is silly, and there's only a certain amount of barriers you could go into. You can't take it so seriously when it's absolutely the sharks flying in the sky. It's so out there that it's actually really funny." The cast had to imagine the presence of sharks due to a green screen being frequently in use. Ian Ziering stated that he had serious reservations about the script but was motivated, in part, by the need to earn enough to qualify for Screen Actors Guild health insurance for his family.

== Release ==
The premiere of the film was watched by 1.37 million viewers, which is slightly below the average audience of 1.5 million viewers for a typical Syfy original film. However, the film was a trend on Twitter, including discussion by celebrities such as Damon Lindelof, Wil Wheaton, and Olivia Wilde. Due to an increase in publicity (mostly through Twitter), Syfy repeated Sharknado on Thursday, July 18, 2013, one week after its premiere. That airing was watched by 1.89 million viewers, an increase of 38% over its initial airing. On July 27, a third airing of Sharknado got 2.1 million viewers, continuing the increase in popularity of the film and setting a record for most watched original film encore in Syfy history. Sharknado was projected to increase revenue for The Asylum from $5 million in 2009 to $19 million in 2013.

A representative of the National Weather Service jokingly recommended what to do in case of a sharknado, saying: "As with any waterspout or tornado, the best advice is to be in an interior part of the lowest floor of a sturdy building – and not outside, whether sharks are raining down or not." Organizations such as the Red Cross of Oklahoma City also used the film as an opportunity to pass on storm safety information while others incorporated it into their own advertising.

Regal Cinemas announced that at midnight on August 2, 2013, it would play the film in roughly 200 theaters nationally. Tickets sold out quickly in New York, Boston, and Seattle, where more showings were added to appease customer demand. Box office numbers were weak for the midnight showings; estimates were at under $200,000.

=== International broadcast ===
- Australia – Premiere on the Universal Channel was scheduled for September 9, 2013, but was fast-tracked to premiere on July 26, 2013, after the film's wide international response. It rated 54,000 viewers, making it the sixth most watched program for the night (and third most watched non-sport program) on subscription television.
- United Kingdom – Premiered on Syfy on August 7, 2013.
- New Zealand – Premiered on free-to-air television channel Prime on September 17, 2013.
- Germany – Premiered on free-to-air Tele 5 television channel on January 10, 2014 as part of their "Worst films of all times" series.
- Thailand – Broadcast on free-to-air PPTV HD television channel on June 6, 2017.
- Philippines – Premiered on free-to-air television network GMA Network on January 2, 2016 under the Kapuso Movie Night block.

=== Merchandising ===
Syfy and The Asylum announced in August 2013 that Sharknado merchandise would be made available, including shirts and potentially other products, such as costumes, bags and posters. Funko acquired the licensing agreement to manufacture the POP Vinyl version of Sharknado

== Reception ==
Rotten Tomatoes gives the film an approval rating of 77% based on 22 reviews; the average rating is 6.40/10. The site's consensus states: "Proudly, shamelessly, and gloriously brainless, Sharknado redefines 'so bad it's good' for a new generation."

Reviewer Mary McNamara, writing for the Los Angeles Times, mentioned that the plot holes are "the whole point of movies like this: fabulous in-home commentary. Often accompanied by the consumption of many alcoholic beverages." David Hinckley of the New York Daily News said "Sharknado is an hour and a half of your life that you'll never get back. And you won't want to." Kim Newman of Empire called the film "cynical rubbish, with an attention-getting title and just enough footage of terrible CG sharks in a terrible CG tornado chomping on people to fill out a trailer suitable for attracting YouTube hits."

Sharknado has become a cult film. The film was used for a RiffTrax Live event in July 2014, where former Mystery Science Theater 3000 cast members mocked the film for a live audience and broadcast to other theaters through NCM Fathom; the idea for using the film for this was prompted by the Sharknado producers discussing the film with Fathom at the same time. After the event, Ferrante said that "Being skewered by the MST3K guys was an honor." In 2016, Homes.com added a page to their disaster prep guides on How to Prepare Your Home For a Sharknado.

== Sequels ==
The success of Sharknado spawned a series of sequels. In 2023, Sharknado was re-released with new special effects and deleted scenes for the film's tenth anniversary.

A prequel, with the seventh film is due to release in 2026.

== See also ==
- List of killer shark films
- Twister (1996 film)
- Into the Storm (2014 film)
- Night of the Twisters (film)
- Tornado!
