= Sharknado: The Video Game =

2014 video game

- Developer: Other Ocean Interactive
- Publisher: Majesco
- Platform: iOS
- Release: July 25, 2014
- Genre: Endless runner
- Mode: Single-player

Sharknado: The Video Game is a 2014 endless running video game developed by Other Ocean Interactive and published by Majesco. The game is based on the 2014 film Sharknado 2: The Second One.

== Gameplay ==
Players control the actions of the main character, Fin Shepard, who is running through various areas of shark-infested New York City. While he runs, players must weave Fin in and out of three different lanes while encountering various obstacles such as roadblocks, cars, and sharks. Fin can kill sharks with a variety of weapons and some levels require the player to kill a certain number of sharks before proceeding. Each level has three parts: a street running segment, a surfing segment, and a boss fight with a sharknado. During each level players can do things like purchase upgrades and extend their gameplay after death by using gold or chum, which is made available during gameplay or via microtransactions. After successfully completing a level players proceeded to a new level with the same setting, but with an increased difficulty.

== Release ==
The game was announced on July 10, 2014. Jeff Li, vice president of Syfy, said that their "one quest was to get a game out before or at the time of the second movie. We did not give the game developer a lot of time. Usually they want more than a year but here we said we've got to get a quality game out so it can ride the Sharknado 2 wave." According to The Hollywood Reporter, if the game is a success, they will likely move on to another game for consoles.

== Reception ==
Critical reception for Sharknado: The Video Game has been predominantly negative. IGN gave it a rating of 5.5 and wrote, "Sharknado's ridiculous tone, tight controls, and respectful in-app purchases make it fine to play for a while. But once the novelty wears off and you play the same level (and hear the same song) dozens of times over, there's not much left to sink your teeth into." Hardcore Gamer heavily panned the game and commented, "As a game based on a movie that literally aspires to be awful, it falls short of its mark. That is how much of a failure this game is. It is so lazily made that it cannot even get into the realm of epiclly [sic], amazingly bad. It is just a boring, run of the mill endless runner without enough ideas to even be terrible."
