= Sharknado 3: Oh Hell No! =

2015 film by Anthony C. Ferrante

- Promotional release poster
- Written by: Thunder Levin
- Directed by: Anthony C. Ferrante
- Starring: Ian Ziering; Tara Reid; Cassie Scerbo; Bo Derek; Mark McGrath; Frankie Muniz; Ryan Newman; Mark Cuban; Jack Griffo; Harvey Levin; Jerry Springer; David Hasselhoff
- Theme music composer: Christopher Cano; Chris Ridenhour
- Country of origin: United States
- Original language: English

Production
- Producer: David Michael Latt
- Cinematography: Ben Demaree; Laura Beth Love; Scott Wheeler
- Editor: Christopher Roth
- Running time: 90 minutes
- Production companies: The Asylum; Syfy Films
- Budget: US$ 2.4 million

Original release
- Network: Syfy
- Release: July 22, 2015

Related
- Sharknado 2: The Second One (2014); Lavalantula (2015); Sharknado: The 4th Awakens (2016)

Sharknado 3: Oh Hell No! is a 2015 American made-for-television science fiction action comedy disaster film and the third installment in the Sharknado film series, following Sharknado and Sharknado 2: The Second One. The film was directed by Anthony C. Ferrante with Ian Ziering, Tara Reid, Cassie Scerbo, and Mark McGrath reprising their roles from the previous installments. Also joining the cast are David Hasselhoff, Bo Derek, Frankie Muniz, Ryan Newman (replacing Aubrey Peeples in the role of Claudia Shepard, from the first film), and Jack Griffo.

Irish music duo Jedward wrote and performed the film's official theme song "Oh Hell No", and also had a brief cameo in the film. In the film, Fin Shepard and his allies attempt to stop a group of sharknadoes that emerge along the East Coast of the United States, from Washington, D.C., to Florida.

The film premiered on Syfy in the United States on July 22, 2015. as well as a spin-off, titled Lavalantula which also premiered three days later. The fourth follow-up film, Sharknado: The 4th Awakens, was released on July 31, 2016.

== Plot ==
In Washington, D.C., Fin Shepard attends an awards ceremony at the White House, where he is given the Presidential Medal of Freedom by the President for his heroic actions during the 2013 and 2014 sharknadoes. When a tropical depression approaches D.C, a sharknado forms and attacks and destroys the nation's capital, killing the Mayor of New York City, White House Chief of Staff, and multiple Secret Service agents. Fin and the President work together to defeat the sharks, and the sharknado eventually evaporates into thin air, rather than having been taken down by force like before.

Worried that his pregnant wife April, who is attending Universal Orlando Resort with their daughter Claudia and her mother May, is in danger, Fin drives down the East Coast in order to reach Florida. En route, Fin encounters a "fognado", which is destroyed by his former employee Nova Clarke and her partner Lucas Stevens. Nova reveals that she and Lucas have been tracking sharknado activity ever since the events in 2013. Using a mobilized RV equipped with sharknado-destroying weapons, the two have been traveling the country destroying sharknadoes and saving lives.

Nova and Lucas realize that the numerous storms will soon combine into a massive sharknado wall that will destroy the entire East Coast. The trio drive down to the Charleston Air Force Base, where they acquire a fighter jet they'll use to get to Orlando. However, Lucas sacrifices himself in order to destroy an approaching sharknado. Nova and Fin destroy a sharknado approaching the Daytona International Speedway during the Coke Zero 400, causing their jet to crash land in the resort at Universal. There, a sharknado kills Claudia's friend Jess while Claudia and Billy, a random stranger Claudia befriended, escape and reunite with Claudia's family.

Fin, April, Nova, Claudia, Billy and May take shelter in the Universal Studios Globe at the entrance of the resort, which is carried away by a sharknado, injuring May. While she is taken to the hospital, the rest of the group escape Universal and seek the help of Fin's estranged father, former NASA colonel Gil Shepard. Fin approaches him at a diner and convinces him to help him with a risky plan to destroy the storm from space. The group reaches a NASA facility outside Cape Canaveral, where they plan to dissipate the storm by using a top-secret Space Shuttle to blow up large tanks of rocket fuel inside it.

Nova accidentally leaks to April that Fin is heading to space in the shuttle, causing her to confront him as he is getting ready to go on the flight. The sharknado wall hits the NASA facility just as takeoff is about to begin, killing Billy while he is fending off sharks with Claudia. Too late for April to return to the command center, she joins Fin and Colonel Shepard in their journey to space. Nova uses a fighter jet to create a hole in the sharknado wall, allowing the trio a clear entrance to the atmosphere. They launch into space where they detonate the external tank, but it fails to stop the wall of sharknadoes.

Colonel Shepard deploys "Plan B", activating a Reagan-era Strategic Defense Initiative satellite laser weapon, stranding himself in space since there is not enough fuel to propel all of them back to Earth. This time, the sharknadoes are destroyed, but the beam causes the sharks to propel into space, attacking the shuttle. Fin attempts to fight them off using an energy-beam chainsaw, but he and April are swallowed by two different sharks, which fall back down to earth. Fin and April emerge from the sharks unharmed, during which Fin discovers that April had given birth during the descent; Fin decides to name his son Gil.

As April recovers Fin's United States Astronaut Badge, a piece of the shuttle debris falls back down to Earth, seemingly crushing her to death.

== Cast ==
=== Principal cast ===
- Ian Ziering as Fin Shepard
- Cassie Scerbo as Nova Clarke, a former waitress at Fin's restaurant
- Bo Derek as May Wexler, April's mother
- Mark McGrath as Martin Brody, Fin's brother-in-law
- Frankie Muniz as Lucas Stevens, Nova's partner
- Ryan Newman as Claudia Shepard, Fin and April's daughter
- Mark Cuban as President Marcus Robbins
- Jack Griffo as Billy, a guy who befriends Claudia at the theme park.
- David Hasselhoff as Gilbert Grayson Shepard, Fin's father and a former NASA colonel
- Tara Reid as April Wexler, Fin's wife

=== Supporting cast ===
- Blair Fowler as Jess, Claudia's friend
- Michael Winslow as Brian "Jonesy" Jones
- Michelle Beadle as Agent Argyle
- Ne-Yo as Agent Devoreaux
- Chris Jericho as Bruce, the Hollywood Rip Ride Rockit Team Member
- Ann Coulter as Vice President Sonia Buck
- Melvin Gregg as Chad
- Christopher Judge as Lead Agent Model
- Grant Imahara as Lodge
- Lou Ferrigno as Agent Banner
- Lorenzo Lamas as Sergeant Rock
- Kim Richards as Babs Jansen, a Team Member at Universal Studios Orlando (Note: Character name from the movie Animal House, in which "Babs Jansen" ultimately becomes a tour guide at Universal Studios Hollywood.)
- Benjamin Bronk as A Preacher
- Bill Engvall as Gary Martin Hayes, the White House Chief of Staff
- Christopher Lambert as Arne Sleslum
- Cindy Margolis as Ms. Litella
- Kellita Smith as Sergeant Roberta Warren
- Maria Menounos as C.J. Sorkin
- Keltie Knight as Alves
- Reza Farahan as A Park Police Guard #1
- Robert Klein as The Mayor of New York
- Anthony Weiner as NASA Director Regina
- Tim Russ as General Gottlieb
- Maryse Ouellet Mizanin as A Park Police Guard #2
- Ryan Kerrigan as Technician Garber
- Renee Willett as Technician
- Michael Bolten as Steve, the ride attendant
- Rick Fox as Principle SSA Webb
- Ron Starrantino as Private Kelly
- Jerry Springer as Mr. White
- Ray J as Tom Major
- Genevieve Morton as A Guest At The White House
- Penn Jillette as Lieutenant Colonel Stylo
- Teller as Major Caissier
- Joey Logano as Himself
- Brad Keselowski as Himself
- Kendra Wilkinson as Flo
- Bobak Ferdowsi as Matt Mason
- Holly Madison as Lieutenant Harrison
- Harvey Levin as Lester Williams
- Derek Caldwell as Airman Ray
- Josh Barnett as Sergeant Richards
- Max Kellerman as Airman Joseph
- Yasmin Yeganeh as Specialist Atkins
- Gerald "Slink" Johnson as Lieutenant Jared
- Darcy Demoss as An Airman #1
- Jorge Bernal as Bernie
- Marcellus Wiley as Specialist Iverson
- Chris Kirkpatrick as A Lifeguard
- Tom Compton as A Reporter
- Michele Bachmann as Herself
- Brian Mitchell as Technician Howe
- Jessalyn Gerbholz as a Universal Parkgoer
- Kelly Colbourne as a Universal Parkgoer
- Diana Terranova as The Bride
- George R. R. Martin as Himself
- Matt Lauer as Himself
- Al Roker as Himself
- Natalie Morales as Herself
- Savannah Guthrie as Herself
- Kathie Lee Gifford as Herself
- Hoda Kotb as Herself
- Elvis Duran as Himself
- Alexis Ohanian as Himself
- Jared S. Fogle as Himself (Note: The scenes concerning Jared Fogle were cut from the SyFy broadcast following his legal issues prior to the film's premiere.)
- Tony Pace as Himself
- George H. Diller as Himself (Note: George Diller is the real-life public affairs announcer at NASA.)
- Bill Davis as Himself (Note: Bill Davis is the real-life president of Universal Orlando. He has a cameo as a greeter at the ticket gate.)
- Doug Burdinski as Douglas Vortex
- Frank Kramer as Himself (Note: Heidi Decker and Frank Kramer of The Heidi & Frank Show radio show on Dish Nation had cameos as radio hosts.)
- Heidi Decker as Herself
- Avalon Stone as Carly
- Juliana Ferrante (Note: Juliana Ferrante is director Anthony C. Ferrante's daughter.) as Juliana
- Anthony C. Ferrante as NASA Launch Director Marymee
- Petunia as Herself (Note: Petunia is a stuffed animal possum who has regular cameo appearances in the Sharknado series.)

=== Cameos ===
- Erika Jordan as NASA Engineer Harleen Quinn
- Bruno Salomone as René Joubert
- Thunder Levin as Mr. Benchley, from the Post
- Chad Johnson as NASA Technician
- Jedward as A Tourist
- Neville Southall
- Rhonda Rhodes as A Shocked Woman in the Universal Orlando scene.
- Oliver Kalkofe and Peter Rütten as Rollercoaster Patrons

== Production ==
Sharknado 3 was filmed on location at Universal Orlando, São Paulo, Brazil, Northern New Jersey, San Juan, Puerto Rico, and Washington, D.C.

The role of the President was written with former Governor of Alaska Sarah Palin in mind, but she declined. The part was then offered to businessman and 2000 Presidential candidate Donald Trump, but he took time to decide since he was preparing a real presidential campaign. After production went ahead and cast Mark Cuban in the role, Trump's lawyers responded angrily and threatened to sue the production.

== Music ==
The original motion picture soundtrack was also released in 2015 and included 13 tracks from the film's score, contributed by various artists. Camper Van Beethoven, Quint and East Bay Ray contributed two songs each.

== Reception ==
On Rotten Tomatoes it has a 36% score with an average rating of 3.9/10, based on reviews from 33 critics. The consensus reads: "Sharknado 3: Oh Hell No! bites off more than it can chew, leaving viewers with an overlong mess that isn't even bad enough to be good." On Metacritic, the film has a score of 53 out of a 100 based on reviews from 19 critics, indicating "mixed or average reviews".

Brian Lowry of Variety said the self-reference gag was beginning to yield diminishing returns. He further added that the question is whether the parent company's insatiable appetite to cash in would hasten the feeding frenzy. Don Kaplan of The New York Daily News said the movie left a fishy taste behind. Neil Genzlinger of The New York Times said Sharknado 3's absurdities was turned to funny levels. He also said it was shameless in certain ways, with one being product placement. Matt Fowler from IGN said the film is surprisingly awful.

== Comic book ==
A tie-in one shot comic, Archie vs. Sharknado, was released on July 22, 2015, by Archie Comics. Written by Ferrante and illustrated by Dan Parent, it depicts a Sharknado striking Riverdale.

== Spin-off and sequel ==
A promotional trailer reveals that Ziering also makes an appearance as Fin Shepard in its first spin-off of the Sharknado franchise, Lavalantula, which debuted on July 25, 2015, three days after Sharknado 3's premiere. This indicates that it takes place in a shared universe. As the character spoke that he has "shark problems right now", this may indicate that the events of Lavalantula take place just before or concurrent with Sharknado 3. Steve Guttenberg, the star of Lavalantula, appears in Sharknado: The 4th Awakens, reprising the role of Colton West in cameo; Michael Winslow also appears in both films, but as different characters.

A follow-up sequel, Sharknado 4 was confirmed to follow upon Sharknado 3's premiere. The film concludes with a cliffhanger leaving open the question as to whether April is killed by falling wreckage. An ad campaign that commenced after the film promoted a Twitter campaign offering fans the chance to decide her fate with the hashtags "#AprilLives" or "#AprilDies", with the results to be revealed in Sharknado 4. The fourth installment aired on July 31, 2016.
