= Sharknado 2: The Second One =

2014 film by Anthony C. Ferrante

- Promotional release poster
- Written by: Thunder Levin
- Directed by: Anthony C. Ferrante
- Starring: Ian Ziering; Tara Reid; Vivica A. Fox; Mark McGrath; Kari Wuhrer
- Theme music composer: Christopher Cano; Chris Ridenhour
- Country of origin: United States
- Original language: English

Production
- Producer: David Michael Latt
- Cinematography: Ben Demaree
- Editors: Ana Florit; Vashi Nedomansky
- Running time: 95 minutes
- Production companies: The Asylum; Syfy Films
- Budget: $2 million

Original release
- Network: Syfy
- Release: July 30, 2014

Related
- Sharknado (2013); Sharknado 3: Oh Hell No! (2015)

Sharknado 2: The Second One is a 2014 American made-for-television film and a sequel to the 2013 television film Sharknado and the second installment in the Sharknado film series. It was directed by Anthony C. Ferrante, with Ian Ziering and Tara Reid reprising their roles from the first film. The film premiered on July 30, 2014, and was the highest-premiering film on the Syfy Channel.

In the film, Fin Shepard travels to New York with April Wexler and attempts to stop a group of sharknadoes that appear there.

The third film, Sharknado 3: Oh Hell No!, was released on July 22, 2015.

== Plot ==
Fin Shepard and his former wife, April Wexler, are traveling to New York City to promote How to Survive a Sharknado and Other Unnatural Disasters, a book April has written about the Los Angeles sharknado. As the plane comes in for a landing through a storm, it is battered by airborne sharks, losing an engine. Sharks enter the plane, killing passengers and the crew, including both pilots. While Fin lands the plane, April's hand is severed while she attempts to shoot a shark with an air marshal's handgun.

Fin's sister, Ellen Brody, is sightseeing in New York with her family. Her husband, Martin, a childhood friend of Fin's, takes their son, Vaughn, to a Mets game at Citi Field along with Martin's and Fin's friends Skye and Brian. Ellen takes their daughter, Mora, to the Statue of Liberty, where she meets with her friends, Polly and Chrissie, who tell her about Fin's recent appearance.

At the airport, Fin tries to warn the crowd of the impending storm, only for no one to take him seriously. After leaving April to the hospital for surgery, Fin is able to contact Ellen, and tells her to get to the Bales Tower Hotel on Manhattan as soon as possible. He agrees to retrieve Martin and Vaughn from the ball game, hiring a cabbie, Ben, in the process. At Citi Field, Skye surprises Fin with a kiss, but Fin explains that he and April are back together. The game is cancelled because of the storm, but when sharks start falling from the sky and killing people, Fin and his group improvise weapons to fight them and go to the subway.

On the ferry ride back to Manhattan, a shark kills Chrissie. The remaining three women flee from the severed head of the Statue of Liberty. Meanwhile, the subway tunnels flood, sending sharks to break into the train's rear cabin and kill Brian. Ben, who anticipated Fin's escape, takes Fin and the others to shops in search of weapons and items to make explosives. When the taxi is caught in a flood, Fin forms a rope swing to take Skye, Vaughn, and Martin to safety. When Ben is killed in his attempt and the rope falls away, Fin uses the top of the sharks as stepping stones to reach the others.

Two sharknadoes are converging into a more powerful storm directly above the hotel. Fin and Skye head to the roof to try to bomb the sharknadoes. Polly is flattened by a whale shark, but Ellen and Mora reach the hotel, and reunite with Martin and Vaughn. Fin and Skye sling bombs into the tornadoes, but as the storm system is too cold; only a few sharks are knocked down, and they are forced to flee down a fire exit stairwell. They meet the Brodys, who were fleeing up the stairwell that is flooding with sharks. They break down a door to escape the stairwell and leave the building.

April flees the hospital, taking a fire truck to meet Fin and the others. At the Empire State Building, a third tornado is expected to merge with the other two. Fin plans to detonate a tank of Freon at the top of the building by connecting it to the structure's lightning rod to halt the storm. He rallies a crowd of New Yorkers, including the mayor and his task force, to battle the sharks. As he and Skye implement the plan, April, who has affixed a circular saw to her stump, arrives and saves Fin from a falling shark. Skye sacrifices herself to help connect the cables; the Freon explosion throws them in the air where sharks rip Skye in half. While in the twister, Fin grabs onto and rides a great white shark using chains, eventually impaling it on the building's antenna. He reunites with April and finds her lost arm in one of the fallen sharks, using the handgun to kill another one. He then takes the wedding ring from April's severed hand and uses it to propose remarriage, and she accepts.

== Cast ==
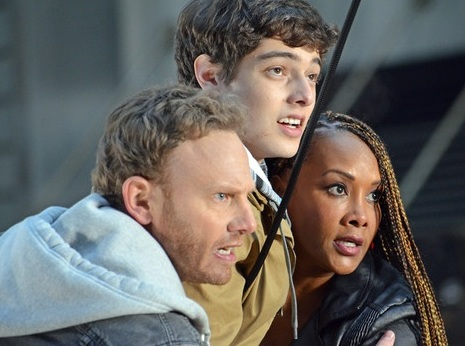
Ian Ziering, Vivica A. Fox and Dante Palminteri prepare to jump the sharks

=== Principal cast ===
- Ian Ziering as Fin Shepard
- Vivica A. Fox as Skye, Fin's former high school classmate.
- Mark McGrath as Martin Brody, Fin's brother-in-law
- Kari Wuhrer as Ellen Brody, Fin's sister and Martin's wife
- Tara Reid as April Wexler, Fin's former wife

=== Supporting cast ===
- Courtney Baxter as Mora Brody, Martin and Ellen's daughter
- Dante Palminteri as Vaughn Brody, Martin and Ellen's son
- Judd Hirsch as Ben, a taxi driver
- Stephanie Abrams as Herself, reporting on The Weather Channel
- Kurt Angle as Fire Chief
- Benjy Bronk as Homeless Guy
- Downtown Julie Brown as Nurse Fletcher
- Juan Castano as Firefighter
- Don Castro (Makowski) as Transit Cop
- Lyman Chen as Concierge
- Billy Ray Cyrus as Dr. Quint
- Sandy "Pepa" Denton as Polly
- Andy Dick as Officer Doyle
- D. C. Douglas as Bud
- Michael J. Dugan as Lou
- Nathan Fast as Radio DJ
- Jared Fogle as Jared From Subway
- Judah Friedlander as Bryan
- William Yeagle as Jared's Friend
- Robert Hays as Captain Bob Wilson, the pilot of Santa Mira Flight 209.
- Perez Hilton as Impatient Passenger
- Melanie Hinkle as Paramedic
- Daymond John as Wall Street Man
- Richard Kind as Harland "The Blaster" McGuinness
- Robert Klein as The Mayor
- David Lambo as Subway Victim
- Matt Lauer as Himself, on The Today Show.
- Biz Markie as Vinnie, a pizza chef
- Raphael Miranda as Himself
- Alexis Molnar as Pizza Worker
- Kelly Osbourne as Flight Attendant
- Kelly Oxford as Annoyed Woman on Plane
- Austin Priester as Sky Marshall Ramis
- Kelly Ripa as Herself, on the show Live with Kelly & Michael
- Al Roker as Himself, on The Today Show.
- Tiffany Shepis as Chrissie
- Michael Strahan as Himself, on Live with Kelly & Michael
- Allee Stone as Nikki
- Avalon Stone as May
- Spencer Stone as Jimmy
- Rachel True as 1st Officer Jonni Valentine, Santa Mira Flight 209
- Thomas P. Vitale as Father at Mets Game (Note: Thomas Vitale is the Executive Vice President of Programming & Original Movies for Syfy. He and his family cameo at the Mets game)
  - Antoinette Vitale as Mother at Mets Game
  - Giovanni T., Ava B., Cararose P., and Patrick A. Vitage as Kids at Mets Game
  - Joan L. and Patrick J. Vitale as Grandparents at Mets Game
- Cat Wallace as Mom on Plane
- Kiki Weiss as Sherry
- Gerald Webb as Technician
- Raymond T. Williams as Maxx
- Anthony C. Ferrante as Guy with Guitar
- Petunia as Herself (Note: Petunia is a stuffed animal possum who has regular cameo appearances in the Sharknado series.)

Many of the cameo appearances made nods to previous roles the guests had played. Robert Hays was previously a pilot in Airplane!; Judd Hirsch was a cab driver in Taxi, Daymond John is a panelist on Shark Tank, Jared Fogle was a longtime spokesman for Subway restaurants, and Billy Ray Cyrus was a doctor in Doc.

Wil Wheaton had an uncredited cameo as an airline passenger along with his real life wife Anne. Jason John Beebe also makes an appearance in the film.

Lauer and Roker appeared as themselves, hosting The Today Show; Abrams appeared as an anchor for The Weather Channel. Both of those properties, like Syfy, are owned by Comcast. In contrast, Michael Gelman, Strahan and Ripa all reprised their roles from Live with Kelly and Michael in the film; that show is not a Comcast property, instead directly competing with The Today Show.

There are multiple in-jokes about Jaws (1975). Polly (Peggy Scott) was Mr. Brody's secretary, Martin Brody (Roy Scheider) was the chief, Ellen (Lorraine Gary) was his wife, Vaughn (Murray Hamilton) was the mayor's last name, Quint (Robert Shaw) was the shark hunter, and Chrissy (Susan Backlinie) was the name of the first victim.

== Reception ==
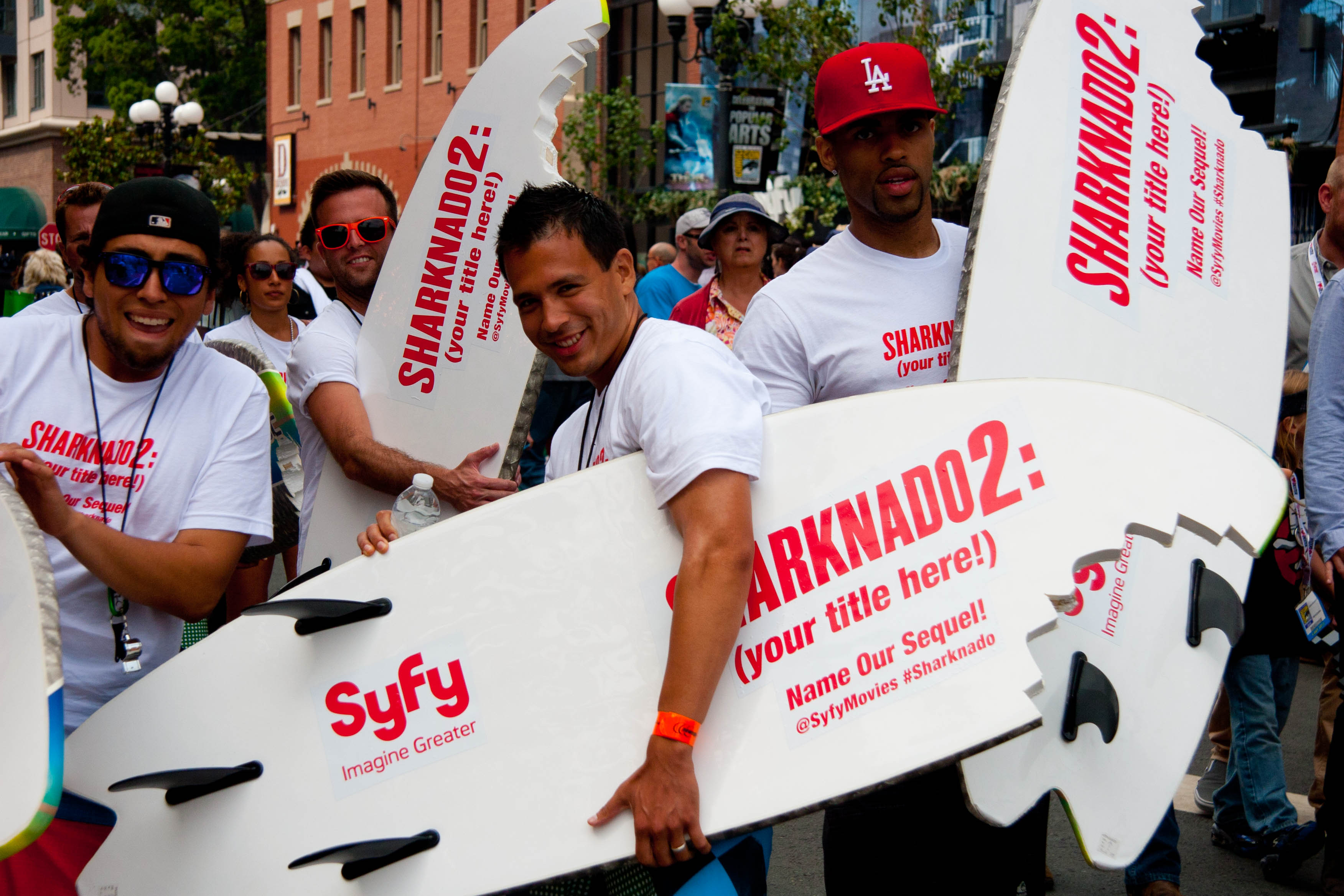
Promoters of Sharknado 2 at San Diego Comic-Con in 2013

On review aggregator website Rotten Tomatoes, the film has a 61% rating based on 31 critics; the consensus states: "The schlock factor for Sharknado 2: The Second One is not as entertaining as its predecessor's, though fans of the brand will likely enjoy it." On Metacritic, the film has a rating of 50 out of 100, based on 17 critics, indicating "mixed or average reviews".

Brian Lowry of Variety said the CGI sharks looked terrible. Neil Genzlinger of The New York Times said that it seems nothing more than dumb fun. Verne Gay of Newsday said the film doesn't take itself as seriously as the original. He also said the film is not as good as the first.

Don Kaplan of the New York Daily News said the film was "a slightly better, more watchable movie than its predecessor." Caroline Framke of The A.V. Club gave the film an 'A', stating the "over-hyped sequel has zero business being this much fun".

== Broadcast ==
The sequel was broadcast on SyFy on July 30, 2014. In the UK, Australia and other countries, it was broadcast just minutes behind the US premiere, in most cases on each country's respective SyFy channel. Upon airing, the film was watched by 3.9 million viewers, with 1.6 million in the 18–49 demographic.

Fathom Events released the film for one night in theaters across the United States on August 21, 2014.

== Tie-in merchandise ==
Two pieces of tie-in merchandise were released to coincide with the release of Sharknado 2. Sharknado: The Video Game, an endless runner video game, was released on July 20, 2014 to mostly negative reviews. A comedic survival guide entitled How to Survive a Sharknado and Other Unnatural Disasters (the book that Tara Reid's character was to promote in the film) was released through Three Rivers Press on July 8, 2014.

== Franchise ==
=== Sequels ===
July 2014 SyFy announced that there would be a Sharknado 3: Oh Hell No! premiering 22 July 2015 taking place in Washington, D.C., and Orlando, FL.

Sharknado: The 4th Awakens was confirmed to follow upon Sharknado 3's premiere.

Sharknado 5: Global Swarming was confirmed in October 2016, and was released on August 6, 2017.

The Last Sharknado: It's About Time was confirmed in February 2018 to follow upon Sharknado 5's premiere.

=== Spin-off ===
It aired on the promised date, followed by Lavalantula, which debuted July 25, 2015, the Saturday after Sharknado 3's Wednesday premiere. Lavalantula featured Sharknado's protagonist in a cameo wearing a white T-shirt with crossed chainsaws. This indicates that it takes place in a shared universe. As he says he has "shark problems right now", this may indicate that the events of Lavalantula take place just before or concurrently with Sharknado 3.

=== Prequel ===
Sharknado Origins was revealed in November 2025 and is set to release in Summer 2026.

== Comics ==
Archie Comics also released a story about Archie Andrews encountering a Sharknado leading up to the third film.
