= Witchblade (film) =

2000 television film directed by Ralph Hemecker

- Advertisement
- Genre: Supernatural; Fantasy; Action; Superhero
- Based on: Witchblade by: Marc Silvestri; David Wohl; Brian Haberlin; Michael Turner
- Written by: J. D. Zeik
- Directed by: Ralph Hemecker
- Starring: Yancy Butler; Anthony Cistaro; Conrad Dunn; David Chokachi; Kenneth Welsh; Will Yun Lee; Eric Etebari
- Music by: Joel Goldsmith
- Country of origin: United States
- Original language: English

Production
- Executive producers: Dan Halsted; Marc Silvestri
- Producers: Perry Husman; Brad Foxhoven; David Wohl
- Cinematography: Anghel Decca
- Editors: Norman Buckley; Gordon McClellan
- Running time: 94 minutes
- Production companies: Halsted Pictures; Top Cow Productions; Warner Bros. Television

Original release
- Network: TNT
- Release: August 27, 2000

Related
- Witchblade (2001 TV series)

Witchblade is a made-for-television live-action superhero film adapted from the comic book by Marc Silvestri and Top Cow Productions. Set in contemporary New York City, the occult police drama centers on Sara Pezzini (Yancy Butler), a brooding and willful homicide detective who is the reluctant inheritor of an ancient, symbiotic weapon that grants her superhuman powers.

Witchblade was directed by Ralph Hemecker, written by J. D. Zeik, and produced by Top Cow Productions and Halsted Pictures in association with Warner Bros. Television. After a world-premiere screening at the Wizard World Chicago 2000 convention, the Turner Network Television (TNT) film made its debut August 27, 2000. The strong ratings performance of the two-hour action-thriller led to the TNT original series Witchblade (2001–2002).

== Plot ==
When one of her best friends is murdered, NYPD homicide detective Sara Pezzini (Yancy Butler) is bitter at being unable to bring her killer to justice. Sara is certain the killer is Tommy Gallo (Conrad Dunn), a legendary hit man who seems untouchable.

After one of Gallo's henchmen assaults her partner, Danny Woo (Will Yun Lee), Sara pursues him into a museum where the artifacts of Joan of Arc are among those displayed. While searching for Gallo's man, Sara is momentarily transfixed by a metal gauntlet in a display case – and is startled by a mysterious figure (Eric Etebari) who vanishes as quickly as he appears. During a savage gunfight in the museum, the display case is shattered and the gauntlet careens through space and finds Sara's arm, miraculously protecting her. In time it appears that all of these events have converged through the machinations of a billionaire named Kenneth Irons (Anthony Cistaro), a man obsessed with an artifact called the Witchblade.

The Witchblade is a magical weapon that chooses who will wear it – and it has chosen but a few warriors, all of them women, throughout the centuries. To understand the Witchblade and why she was chosen to wield it, Sara embarks on a difficult search for self-discovery and justice.

== Cast ==
- Yancy Butler as Sara Pezzini, homicide detective and reluctant bladewielder
- Anthony Cistaro as Kenneth Irons, billionaire obsessed with controlling the bearer of the Witchblade
- Conrad Dunn as Tommy Gallo, most powerful man in the underworld
- David Chokachi as Jake McCartey, rookie NYPD police detective and former champion surfer
- Kenneth Welsh as Joe Siri, Sara's supervisor, also her late father's partner and best friend
- Will Yun Lee as Danny Woo, Sara's partner and guardian angel
- Eric Etebari as Ian Nottingham, enigmatic protégé of Kenneth Irons
- John Hensley as Gabriel Bowman
- Jody Racicot as Drexler
- Hal Eisen as Lorenzo Vespucci
- Jim Codrington as Officer Smitty
- Tony Munch as Guy in Men's room
- Katherine Trowell as Receptionist
- Whitney Westwood as Maria Bonazzi

== Production ==
In April 1998, Turner Network Television announced plans for the two-hour live-action feature film, Witchblade, to premiere in early 1999 as part of the cable network's significant increase in original programming. The film was to be the pilot for an hour-long TNT series that would be filmmaker Oliver Stone's first drama series for television. Executive producer Stone had taken Top Cow's project to Warner Bros. Television, which agreed to finance development and took Witchblade to TNT, a sister company in the Time-Warner family. In October 1999, the pilot film was still in development with Stone's company, Illusion Entertainment, but when filming began in February 2000, Stone was no longer attached to the Witchblade project. Instead, Witchblade was executive produced by Dan Halsted, Stone's former partner, and Top Cow Productions' Marc Silvestri.

Executive producer Marc Silvestri explained Stone's departure during the production: "As with all things Hollywood it was several train wrecks that somehow made it to the station. Honestly, it amazes me how anything gets produced at all". Silvestri attributed Stone's departure to a creative dispute with TNT.

The teleplay by J. D. Zeik is a loose adaptation of the Top Cow comic book. Director Ralph Hemecker said: "We use the comic book to get the essential DNA of the story. We've maintained a lot of the elements of the original eight issues of the comic book ... making it more of a character-driven piece".

Witchblade was filmed in Toronto in February and March 2000. As well as original music by Joel Goldsmith, the soundtrack includes songs by U2 ("Mysterious Ways"), Beth Orton ("She Cries Your Name"), Rob Zombie ("Living Dead Girl") and The Guess Who ("American Woman"). After a world-premiere screening at the Wizard World Chicago 2000 convention on August 4, 2000, the telefilm premiered on TNT Sunday, August 27, 2000.

"Emergence", the episode that begins the second season of the Witchblade television series, uses scenes from the pilot film in presenting an alternative scenario after Sara uses the powerful weapon to reverse time.

== Reception ==
Witchblade was the top-rated movie for the week of August 21–27, 2000, earning a 4.5 Nielsen rating (3,491,000 households) for its premiere broadcast. The TNT Original also was the top movie among the key adult demographics 18–49 (3,157,000) and the most-watched program among adults 25–54 (3,631,000). The thriller was still the number-one original movie among adults 18–49 and 25–54 in October 2000, when TNT announced that it had ordered 11 one-hour episodes of an action-drama series into production.

The WB Television Network, a sibling of TNT in the Time Warner media conglomerate, selected Witchblade as the debut film for a new Tuesday-night movie series in May 2001. In its broadcast-television debut, the movie drew 5.2 million viewers – matching the numbers the WB earned with Buffy the Vampire Slayer and Angel in the previous season, and topping the WB's season average of 4.2 million viewers.

On TNT, Witchblade was reprised June 5, 2001, introducing the Warner Bros. TV series of the same name, which began airing a week later.

== Home media ==
In April 2001, Warner Home Video released Witchblade in Australia in PAL-format VHS. The 91-minute film was rated M (medium level violence, supernatural theme) by the Classification Board of Australia.

In July 2008, Witchblade was released as part of Witchblade – The Complete Series, a seven-disc set that comprised the feature-length pilot and all 23 episodes of the TV series. Although the widescreen Region 1 DVD set from Warner Home Video features an all-new soundtrack selected by the executive producer, the songs in the series pilot were not replaced.

== Awards ==
- 2001, Nominee, Saturn Award
  Best Single Television Presentation
  Academy of Science Fiction, Fantasy & Horror Films
- 2001, Nominee, American Society of Cinematographers Award
  Movie of the Week, Miniseries or Pilot (Basic or Pay), Anghel Decca, Cinematographer
  American Society of Cinematographers
- 2001, Nominee, Golden Reel Award
  Best Sound Editing, Television Movies and Specials – Dialogue & ADR
  Michael E. Lawshe, supervising sound editor/supervising ADR editor; Jennifer Mertens, supervising sound editor; Virginia Cook-McGowan, supervising dialogue editor; Jessica A. Dickson, ADR editor; Bruce M. Honda, dialogue editor
  Motion Picture Sound Editors
- 2001, Nominee, Golden Reel Award
  Best Sound Editing, Television Movies and Specials – Effects & Foley
  Michael E. Lawshe, supervising sound editor; Timothy A. Cleveland, Paul J. Diller, Kenneth Young, Eric C. Hosmer, Rick Hromadka and Wayne O'Brien, sound editors; Kerry Malony, Foley editor
  Motion Picture Sound Editors
