= Magdalena (character) =

American comic book superheroine character

The Magdalena
- Cover of Magdalena TPB by Eric Basaldua

Publication information
- Publisher: Top Cow Productions
- First appearance: (Rosalia and Mariella)The Darkness #15 (June 1998), (Paitence) Witchblade #62 (March 2003)
- Created by: Joe Benitez; David Wohl; Malachy Coney

In-story information
- Alter ego: Sister Rosalia; Sister Mariella; Patience
- Team affiliations: Catholic Church
- Abilities: Hand-to-hand combat skills Swordsmanship; Athletic skills

The Magdalena is a superheroine created by Joe Benitez, David Wohl, and Malachy Coney for Top Cow Productions. The character is based on the Biblical character of Mary Magdalene, and the theory of the bloodline resulting from Mary's marriage to Jesus Christ, from which according to the storyline, the Magdalena is descended.

Each Magdalena wields the Spear of Destiny (Holy Lance), the spear that pierced the side of Jesus.

== Publication history ==
The Magdalena first appeared in The Darkness #15 (June 1998) and only appeared in two brief series. The Magdalena has been featured in The Darkness, Witchblade, Tomb Raider, and Vampirella, and in its own series of twelve issues from April 2010 to April 2011.

== Fictional character biography ==
The Magdalena is the title of a series of women descended from Jesus Christ via his marriage to Mary Magdalene. The Magdalena inherits great powers from the royal bloodline and acts as a warrior in the defence of the Catholic Church.

The Roman Catholic Church has been the Magdalena's employer since the Middle Ages, raising her from childhood and training her until she is ready to carry out her role. The Inquisition, a secretive and powerful council of cardinals, oversees the Magdalena's activities and decides her missions.

=== Sister Rosalia ===
Sister Rosalia was a former Magdalena who died when she was 33 years old. She was raped as a teenager by a masked assailant. She became pregnant as a result of the assault and gave birth to a girl. The child was stolen from her and raised in an unidentified convent.

In her last mission, she was sent to investigate vampirism in France. She was informed that vampirism is a retrovirus that forces vampires to consume blood to restore their hemoglobin. She decided that they were not evil and aided their escape. She was killed by the soldiers of the Inquisition, the Garduna, for trying to prevent them from slaughtering the vampires. It was hinted that Rosalia might have been infected with the virus and would rise three days after her death, mirroring the Resurrection of Jesus.

=== Sister Mariella ===
Mariella, the adult daughter of Rosalia, was sent to kill Jackie Estacado with the Spear of Destiny, but unbeknownst to her she still wasn't fully trained and wasn't able to differentiate between right and wrong. After the Sisters of the Order of Magdalene performed the ritual which gave Mariella the ability to divine a person's sins, she and her Sisters were overpowered and defeated by Jackie, who made an example of them by crucifying them in the church. After recovering from her crucifixion and the fight with Jackie, Mariella learned where the Spear of Destiny was and prepared to retrieve it. While doing so, she encountered the Angelus and Appolonia Francetti in the Amazon rainforest and was again left to die after Appolonia used a portion of the Darkness' power to subdue her.

=== Patience ===
The third and current Magdalena is known as Patience, created by writer Brian Holguin. Patience was in her novitiate but she left her convent suddenly, forcing the Inquisition to send an agent, Kristof, to track her down when her time came to assume the role of the Magdalena.She debuted in Witchblade #62.

Kristof found Patience living on the streets with a homeless girl named Rowan Barry. Kristof became Patience's mentor and gave her basic training. Patience was initially hesitant but later accepted her destiny when Rowan was abducted by agents of an evil force. The events lead to a disagreement with Kristof and the Inquisition, prompting her to declare herself independent of their control. She remains allied with them only when their goals do not conflict with her ethics.

Patience appeared again when Sara Pezzini, an officer of the New York City Police Department and wielder of the Witchblade, was attacked by a bloodthirsty demon posing as a young woman. Patience helped her to drive away the demon.

=== Benedetta Maria Ferro ===
Benedetta was a Magdalena of Spanish descent who tried to stop Jackie Estacado's ancestor, Miguel Estacado, from obtaining a treasure meant for the Pope. During her battle with Estacado, she was fatally wounded before plunging the Spear of Destiny into the hull of Estacado's ship. Before her death, Miguel took the spear, intending to return it to the Holy See, and left her to die, a decision he later regretted.

== Powers and abilities ==
Each Magdalena has the innate ability to see into the human heart and show people the error of their ways in order to give them the chance to redeem their sins. Additionally, each Magdalena wields the Spear of Destiny, the spear that pierced the side of Christ, as a weapon against demons and evil magic.

== Planned movie ==
A movie was planned by Top Cow in 2008. In July 2009, Ryûhei Kitamura was attached to direct with Holly Brix writing. Jenna Dewan and Luke Goss were set to star. The project never came to fruition.
