= Eric Basaldua =

American comic book artist

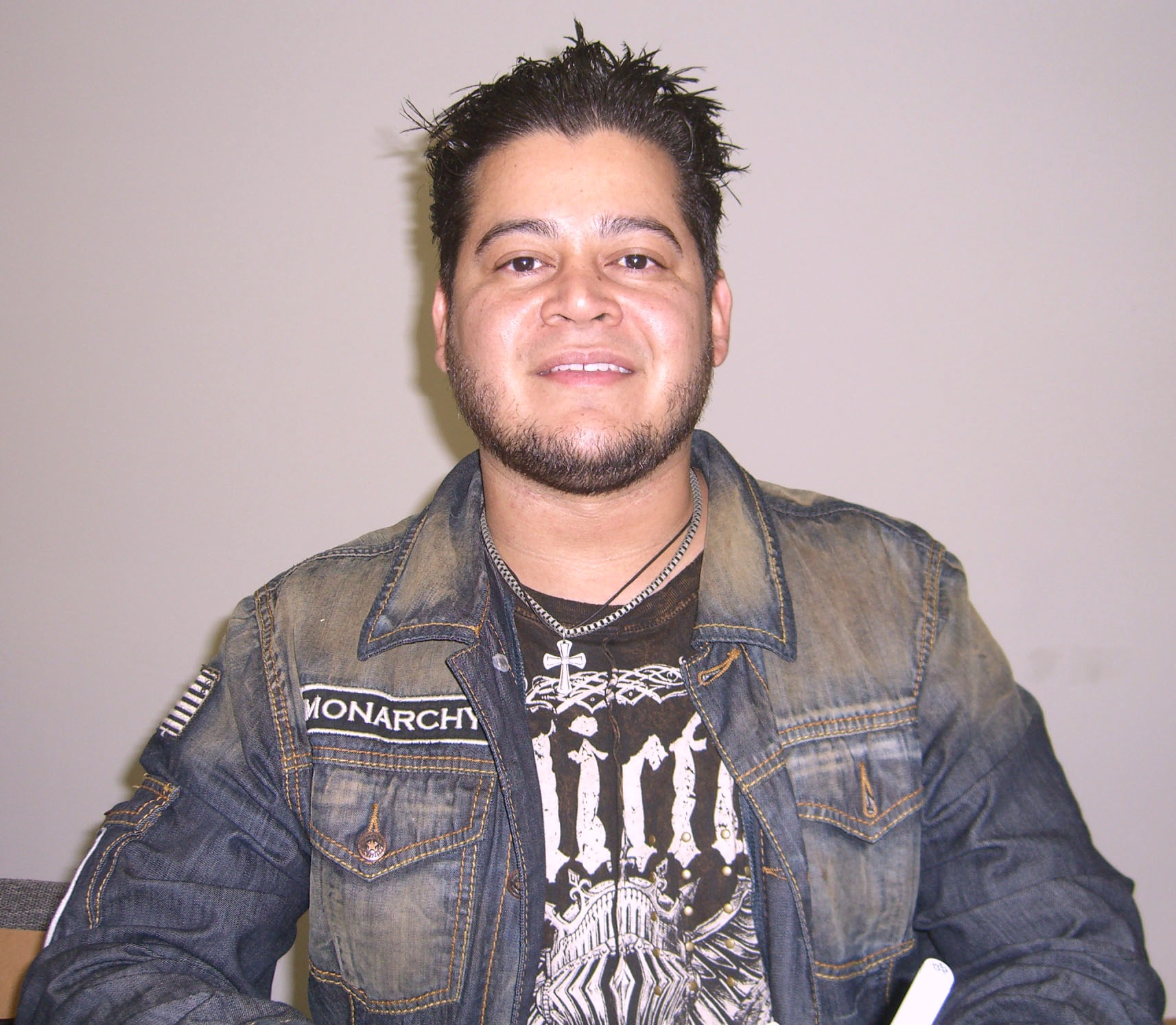
- Basaldua at the Big Apple Convention in Manhattan, October 18, 2009.
- Born: August 26, 1980 (age 46)
- Areas: Penciller, Inker
- Pseudonym: Ebas

Eric Basaldua (born August 26, 1980, and sometimes credited as Ebas) is an American comic book artist

== Career ==
Basaldua started his career at Top Cow studios working directly under its founder, Marc Silvestri, starting with backgrounds for him. He is also the brother of comic-inker, Rick Basaldua.

Basaldua's most recent interior artwork can be seen in Witchblade Annual #1.

== Bibliography ==
Cover of Magdalena TPB by Basaldua

Comics work includes:

- Blood Legacy; The Young Ones
- Magdalena Volume 2: Preview, #1-4
- Tomb Raider #46, 47
- The Darkness Vol.2 #7
- Darkness/Vampirella #1
- Darkness Volume 2 #7
- Darkness: Level #3
- Eric Basaldua 2006 Sketchbook
- Hunter-Killer #7, 8, 9
- Hunter-Killer: Dossier #1
- Witchblade #92
- Witchblade & Wolverine #1
- Ebas Convention Sketchbook 2007 "Ultimate Peepshow"
- Witchblade/Devi #1
- Ultimate Fantastic Four #56
- Witchblade Annual #1

== Awards and recognition ==
- September 2011 Inkwell Awards Ambassador (September 2011 – present)
