= Danielle Baptiste =

- Danielle Baptiste, featured in the cover art for Witchblade #104; art by Adriana Melo and Stjepan Sejic.

Publication information
- Publisher: Top Cow
- First appearance: Witchblade #100 (Nov. 2006)
- Created by: Ron Marz (writer); Adriana Melo (penciller)

In-story information
- Abilities: None; Formerly the powers of the Angelus, including: Photokinesis; Flight; Superhuman strength Superhuman speed Enhanced senses Enhanced durability and endurance Light-vision; Night-vision; Light-energy blasts Invulnerability; Immortality; Healing factor Semi-organic armor Surface-scale

Danielle "Dani" Anastasia Baptiste is a comic book superheroine in the series Witchblade, published by Top Cow. The character was introduced in the one-hundredth issue, becoming the series' co-lead. An athletic young dancer, Dani becomes the new host of the Witchblade, a mystical gauntlet that grants its host an assortment of powers. The series' story arc then shows the character losing the gauntlet to its original host, but later taking hold of the Angelus, one of the two primal forces of the universe.

== Fictional character biography ==
Dani, an impulsive but good-hearted young woman, was born in New Orleans. She moved to New York to pursue a dance career and fulfill her childhood dream. However, following graduation, she became increasingly frustrated about the lack of direction in her life.

Following a strange dream about a mystical gauntlet, Dani was drawn to an antiques shop owned by the mysterious Curator, who later became a trusted confidant of Dani's. At the antiques shop, Dani encountered Sara Pezzini, who at the time of meeting was the host of the Witchblade (Dani and Pezzini previously encountered each other on the steps of the police department where Sara worked). Dani instantly recognized the Witchblade as the mysterious entity in her dreams and impulsively decided to accept it from Sara, who was focused upon motherhood rather than the adventures that accompany the gauntlet. Sara was initially hesitant about handing the Witchblade over to Dani but changed her mind when she noticed how the gauntlet reacted strongly to Dani's presence.

Dani eventually learned that the Witchblade was actually the balance between two primal forces of the universe — a female entity of light known as the Angelus and a male entity of darkness known as the Darkness. She was drawn back home after her father was taken into a hospital. While Dani was enjoying an evening out in New Orleans, she was harassed by three young men and punished them by drawing them into a dark alley and unleashing the Witchblade, almost choking one of them to death. It was then she realized that the Witchblade had a mind of its own and that she would have to exert more control over it.

Dani was then confronted by a mysterious woman who urged her to go to a nearby graveyard, where she was confronted by rotting and deformed ghosts. They begged Dani to help set them free and explained that the ancient and mystical Madeline Desormeaux, who lived in a large mansion on the edge of the graveyard, had tortured them in life and had bound them to the land in death. Dani agreed and promised to bring Madeline to them for justice.

Dani went into the house, and after a brief fight, emerged triumphant. The ghosts then had their revenge on Desormeaux, and were able to move on. The graveyard and the house then disappeared.

Dani is left feeling increasingly unsure whether or not she can control the Witchblade. She returned to her father's bedside and was delighted to find him conscious. She promised to stay by his side for a few weeks to help his recovery and then return to New York, resolving to get rid of the Witchblade after her ghostly encounter. However, she would later end up changing her mind.

Dani later discovered more about her powers (including the ability of flight) while helping the Magdalena and Jackie Estacado, the host of the Darkness, defend a pregnant Sara. After Sara's life was threatened by giving birth, Danielle returned half of the Witchblade in order to save her.

Later, Madame Kostigian, Dani's dance teacher, asked her to take over introductory classes while she returned to Poland to be with her sister, who had cancer. In the first class she taught, Dani met a girl named Finch. While teaching another class with Finch, Dani sensed something wrong and decided to ask Finch why she was so sad lately. Over coffee Finch revealed that her boyfriend, Rock, was trying to turn her into a prostitute. When Dani stated that she may be able to help, Finch excitedly kissed her, surprising Dani, but Finch immediately apologized and left. While accompanied by Finch, Dani had a brief skirmish with Rock at his apartment, using the Witchblade to frighten him. During this encounter, Rock was accidentally shot and killed by a friend of his who quickly departed. A shaken Dani then went to Sara for help, and the two moved the body into the street, making it look like a suicide. An angry Sara then lashed out verbally, and she and Dani parted ways.

The Curator then informed Dani that when the Witchblade was divided, so, too, were its essences. While Dani's half represented the Angelus, Sara's half represented the Darkness. Without balance, the chaotic nature of Sara's half was slowly corrupting her. Dani then considered giving the Angelus half of the Witchblade to Sara, but was told that doing so would not remove the Darkness's influence from Sara's body, as its effects had already become too great. As such, Dani resolved to recover the second half of the entity. She set out to confront Sara in a final battle but was defeated and lost her half of the Witchblade. However, the Angelus, having possessed Finch, arrived and saved Dani by possessing her. Unlike previous hosts, Dani retained her personality and was able to stop the Angelus from killing Sara, using her newfound powers of Light to free her friend from the taint of the Darkness. She leaves New York after parting with Sara on good terms, and heads back to New Orleans with Finch.

Dani then returned home to New Orleans and moved into an apartment with Finch. After leaving the apartment, she and Finch were attacked by a multi-headed chimera. Dani was forced to call upon the Angelus but was nearly defeated, only to be saved by Sabine, one of the Angelus' followers. Sabine then took Dani with her to the Angelus' home realm.

As the Angelus had not fully taken Dani over, she only retains a vague memory of the Angelus' realm after she was guided by Sabine to the throne room where a copy of the Darkness, pierced by Angelus' spear, was kept. Sabine then talked Dani into planning an attack on Jackie Estacado. She rejected the plan, saying that Jackie was a friend. At the last minute she remembered that Finch was left on Earth and returned just in time to save her from two men attempting to rape her.

After the recreation of the universe, Dani is now a police detective in the Special Cases division and serves as Patrick Gleason's partner. However, she was never the host of the Angelus in this universe as the Angelus' essence was spread amongst her warriors like a hive mind before taking Finch as a new host.

== Powers and abilities ==
=== The Witchblade ===
Dani is a professional ballet dancer; as such, she is very agile and dexterous. Dani was the former host of the Witchblade, during which time she possessed all the powers associated with it.

=== The Angelus ===
Dani once wielded the powers of the Angelus, a universal force of order and creation, the equal and opposite of the Darkness. She possessed superhuman strength, speed and durability. She was able to craft beam-like weapons of light, project light-beams, burn objects and people with her touch, and create a semi-organic armor about herself which increased her durability to near-invulnerability. She could also grow wings from the armor giving her self-propelled flight. Additionally, she could manipulate all aspects of order in existence, possessed healing abilities, immortality, teleportation, night-vision, fire manipulation (an extension of her light manipulation ability) and most importantly, the ability to create objects and sentient beings of pure light and fashion them into shapes and functions that she found pleasing. Her powers were limited, however, since functioning in the dark quickly drained her powers and turned anything she created into dust. The source of her light power was the light energy that half the universe is composed of, the same energy also radiated from her body when she used her powers, while her physical abilities were granted to her by her status as an Angelus host.
