= Eric Etebari =

American actor

- Born: December 5, 1969 (age 55); Hollywood, California, U.S
- Occupation: Actor
- Years active: 1993–present

Eric Etebari (born December 5, 1969) is an American actor. He appeared in Witchblade, 2 Fast 2 Furious and The Lincoln Lawyer. He is also known for his physical portrayal of Dallas in Payday: The Web Series and the video game PAYDAY 2; the latter portrayal is voiced by Simon Kerr.

== Early life and education ==
Raised by his mother, photo artist Jean Ferro in Hollywood, in an artist community, Etebari's first taste of acting came in seventh grade from the Francis Ford Coppola Magnet school program at Bankcroft Jr. High School. He spent the ensuing years at Santa Monica High School where he excelled in sports; playing football, baseball and basketball. He subsequently landed a volleyball scholarship to San Diego State University. While at the SDSU, he was awarded the Commendation of Honor by the San Diego Fire Department for his valor in saving two women from a burning apartment.

== Career ==
After college, he had the opportunity to work with Bruce Weber, which launched his modeling career and also landed a Versace advertising campaign. This ad campaign afforded Etebari the opportunity to also work with Richard Avedon. While in Europe, he worked with Karl Lagerfeld and Robert Fleischauer; he also worked on his own cologne campaign, “Zino” Cologne for Men by Davidoff. Additionally, he has appeared in a successful series of commercials with Director Michael Bay, including the “Bongo Jean” commercial with Liv Tyler. After attending intense acting workshops for several years, he did several guest spots and independent films before being cast to play Ian Nottingham in the Warner Brothers/TNT movie of the week, Witchblade, which led to two seasons as a series regular.

In 2003, Etebari appeared in 2 Fast 2 Furious, racing the classic 1970 Dodge Challenger. He next had a role in the September 2004 release of Cellular, directed by David R. Ellis.

== Filmography ==
- 2000 Witchblade (TV film) as Ian Nottingham
- 2001-2002 Witchblade (TV series) as Ian Nottingham
- 2002 The Honorable as Junior Lopez
- 2003 2 Fast 2 Furious (2003) as U.S. Customs Agent Darden
- 2004 Cellular as Detective Dmitri
- 2011 The Lincoln Lawyer as Charles Talbot
- 2012 Stand Up Guys as Billy, The Bartender
- 2013 Payday: The Web Series as Nathan Steele / Dallas
- 2014 Walk of Shame as Denise's bad date guy
- 2020 Alone as Jack Brian
- 2020 Stoker Hills as Detective Adams
- 2021 Boss Level as Roy #2

=== Notable TV guest appearances ===
- 1993 Zino by Davidoff - commercial circa
- 1996 Silk Stalkings episode: "Partners in Crime"(episode # 6.9) as Jeff Turner
- 1997 413 Hope St. episode: "Redemption" (episode # 1.4) as Unknown
- 1998 Acapulco H.E.A.T. episode: "Code Name: Mr. Paradise" (episode # 1.7) as Unknown
- 2003 Line of Fire episode: "Mockingbird" (episode # 1.4) as Jesse Sherwood
- 2006 Ford Fusion Commercial
- 2006 CSI: Miami episode: "Driven" as Javier Morena
- 2007 American Heiress 41 episodes as Fake Carlos
- 2011 Glee as Reggie 'The Sauce' Salazar (voice)
- 2012 NCIS: Los Angeles as Rinaldo 'The Crimeleon' Maggio
- 2014 Castle episode: "Law & Boarder" (episode # 6.21) as Enver Kotta
- 2021 Narcos: Mexico: Jack Dorian, 4 episodes

=== Producing and directing ===
- 2005 Sorrows Lost (Short) as Producer.
- 2010 Bare Knuckles as Producer and Director.
- 2012 Hood (Short) as Producer.
- 2020 Emerald Run as Director.
