= Anthony Cistaro =

American actor

- Born: June 8, 1963 (age 63); Kirksville, Missouri, U.S.
- Education: Loyola Marymount University (BA); Harvard University (MFA)
- Occupation: Actor
- Years active: 1978–present

Anthony Cistaro (born June 8, 1963) is an American actor. At an early age he moved to San Francisco, California, where his father was a career counselor and instructor at City College of San Francisco. His mother was a homemaker. Cistaro attended St. Ignatius College Preparatory and graduated in 1981.

== Education and training ==
He attended Loyola Marymount University in Los Angeles, California, and obtained a Bachelor of Arts-Double Major in French and Communication Arts, 1985. Additionally, he studied abroad at the American University of Paris.

In Los Angeles he studied acting technique with Stella Adler, going on to the Institute for Advanced Theatre Training at Harvard University, where he performed in over 17 productions and graduated with a Professional Certificate in Acting in 1997.

== Roles ==
=== Film and TV ===
- All Day and a Night (2020) ... Detective Brown
- Sense8 (2016-2017) ... Agent Bendix
  - "What Family Actually Means" (2017)
  - "Polyphony" (2017)
  - "Happy Fucking New Year." (2016)
- Fell, Jumped or Pushed (2016) ... Mike
- Bare Knuckles (2010) ... Donald Loften
- Charmed (2006) ... Dumain
- Witchblade (2000) ... Kenneth Irons
- Witchblade (2001–2002) ... Kenneth Irons
- The Runestone (1990) ... Detective
- The Method (1987) ... Tony
- Lady of the House (1978) ... John David, age 15

=== TV guest appearances ===
- Nip/Tuck (2009) ... Steven Ausbury
- Ugly Betty (2008)...Twenty Four Candles
- Friends (#10.18, 6/5/2004)...The Last One
- Angel: "I've Got You Under My Skin" (#1.14, 2/15/2000) ... "Ethros Demon"
- Angel: "Hero" (#1.9, 11/30/1999) ... "Trask"
- Thanks: "Tobacco" (#1.2, 8/9/1999) ... "Marcel Charmont"
- Alright Already ... "Mario":
  - "Again With the White House" (#1.20, 5/4/1998)
  - "Again With the Photos" (#1.19, 4/27/1998)
  - "Again With the Hockey Player" (two parts: #1.15, 2/8/1998; #1.14, 2/1/1998)
- The Nanny: "Maggie the Model" (#1.12, 2/2/1994) ... "Carlo"
- Seinfeld: "The Masseuse" (#5.9, 11/18/1993) ... "Joel Rifkin"
- Cheers ... "Henri":
  - "The Magnificent Six" (#11.4, 10/22/1992)
  - "A Fine French Whine" (#10.10, 11/21/1991)
  - "Home Malone" (#9.24, 4/25/1991)
  - "It's A Wonderful Wife" (#9.21, 2/28/1991)
  - "Woody Interruptus" (#9.11, 12/13/1990)

=== Other ===
- "The Tolls" (2017) ... Hans
- "Corporate Ladders" (2016) ... Roger
- Mafia: Definitive Edition (2020) ... Pilot (voice)
- Stone Landscape: Master of Illusions: Episode 1 (2006) ... "Vincente"
- According to IMDB, Cistaro’s third-grade portrait appears as the son of the renegade Colonel Walter E. Kurtz in Francis Coppola’s Vietnam War epic “Apocalypse Now.”
