= Witchblade (2001 TV series) =

American television series

- Genre: Superhero; Supernatural; Action; Adventure; Mystery; Thriller; Drama
- Created by: Ralph Hemecker
- Based on: Witchblade by: Marc Silvestri; David Wohl; Brian Haberlin; Michael Turner
- Starring: Yancy Butler; David Chokachi; Anthony Cistaro; Will Yun Lee; John Hensley; Eric Etebari
- Theme music composer: Walter Werzowa and Bernhard Locker (season 1); Joel Goldsmith (season 2)
- Composer: Joel Goldsmith
- Country of origin: United States
- Original language: English
- No. of seasons: 2
- No. of episodes: 23

Production
- Executive producers: Dan Halsted; Ralph Hemecker
- Producer: Vikki Williams
- Running time: 60 minutes
- Production companies: Halsted Pictures; Camelot Pictures; Mythic Films; Top Cow Productions; Warner Bros. Television

Original release
- Network: TNT
- Release: June 12, 2001 – August 26, 2002

Related
- Witchblade (film); Witchblade (2006 series)

Witchblade is an American television series that aired on TNT from June 12, 2001, to August 26, 2002. The series is based on the Witchblade comic book series, and followed a pilot film that debuted in August 2000. Some of the episodes were written by Ralph Hemecker, Marc Silvestri (who also wrote the comic book) and J.D. Zeik.

Yancy Butler starred as Sara Pezzini, Anthony Cistaro as Kenneth Irons, David Chokachi as Jake McCartey, Eric Etebari as Ian Nottingham, Will Yun Lee as Danny Woo, Conrad Dunn as Tommy Gallo, Kenneth Welsh as Joe Siri, and John Hensley as Gabriel Bowman, among others. The show was canceled in September 2002; there was speculation that the cancellation was connected to Butler's entering rehab for alcoholism. Top Cow editor Matt Hawkins said that the series was and remains the highest rated TV series to be cancelled.

The series ran for two seasons on TNT, for a total of 24 episodes (including pilot). The first episode aired June 12, 2001; the last episode aired August 26, 2002. In spite of its cancellation, Witchblade was ranked seventh in the Top 10 Basic Cable Dramas for 2002 (Multichannel News, February 2003).

== Cast and characters ==
=== Main ===
- Yancy Butler as Det. Sara Pezzini
- David Chokachi as Det. Jake McCartney
- Anthony Cistaro as Kenneth Irons
- Will Yun Lee as Det. Danny Woo
- John Hensley as Gabriel Bowman
- Eric Etebari as Ian Nottingham

=== Recurring ===
- Lazar Rockwood as Lazar
- Kathryn Winslow as Vicky Po
- Nestor Serrano as Captain Bruno Dante
- Bill Mcdonald as Jerry Orlinsky
- Kim De Lury as Conchobar
- Johnie Chase as Det. "Jumbo"
- Dov Tiefenbach as Jagger
- Noah Danby as Det. Burgess

== Music ==
The series used song fragments from various artists during the two seasons. Acts like Stabbing Westward, Pump, Michael Kisur, and Suicidal Tendencies were featured in the show soundtrack.

On May 29, 2007, the soundtrack for the series' score was released by composer Joel Goldsmith on his independent record label, FreeClyde.

In 2004, a compilation album, Witchblade the Music, was released on the Edge Artists record label featuring music from/inspired by the Top Cow comic book and the Witchblade TV series. It was compiled and produced by G Tom Mac and Eddie Kislinger.

== Episodes ==
=== Season 1 (2001) ===
No. overall	No. in season	Title	Directed by	Written by	Original release date	Prod. code
1	1	"Parallax"	Ralph Hemecker	S : Richard C. Okie; S/T : Ralph Hemecker	June 12, 2001	227105
Det. Sara Pezzini is slowly learning more about the witchblade. She also finds herself before a hostile review board as they try to piece together what happened at the Rialto Theater. She is saddened to learn that her mentor, Captain Joe Siri, is retiring and he leaves her something from her father. When Sara and her new partner Jake McCartey answer a call to a shooting scene, they learn of a now defunct secret military program to create assassins known as the Black Dragons. One of the remaining Dragons, Hector Mobius, seems to be on the rampage.
2	2	"Conundrum"	Neill Fearnley	S : Ralph Hemecker & Richard C. Okie; T : Edithe Swenson	June 19, 2001	227102
Sara and her new partner, Jake McCartey, investigate when skeletal remains are found carefully posed in a downtown park. Using missing person reports, they determine that the remains are those of Gina Maris, a model employed by Dominique Boucher. Slowly, Sara begins to realize that the woman's death and Boucher are somehow related to the Witchblade. She is shocked when she interviews Karen Bronte, Gina's roommate, only to find a photo of a woman and a young child whom Karen claims is her mother and grandmother. The grandmother could be Sara's identical twin.
3	3	"Diplopia"	Vern Gillum	S : Ralph Hemecker & Richard C. Okie; T : David Michaelson	June 26, 2001	227101
Sara and Jake investigate a series of serial murders in the art community in New York. All of the cases somehow seem related to artist Isaac Sullivan but he has cast iron alibis for all of the murders. Much of the case involves the gay community and Sara takes Jake to task over his homophobia. Meanwhile, Sara meets Gabriel Bowman, a collector of trinket talismans and continues to learn about the history of the Witchblade and the fact that only one who is chosen can use it. Also, Kenneth Irons interferes with Sara's attempts to gain more knowledge about her past.
4	4	"Sacrifice"	David Jackson	S : Ralph Hemecker; S/T : Richard C. Okie	July 3, 2001	227103
Sara investigates the ritual murders of young women. With some assistance from Kenneth Irons, she learns of an ancient Celtic legend that tells of human sacrifice required to bring back to life a warrior queen. She also meets Conchobar, an Irish rock singer (named for the Celtic mythological characters with the same name) who has a profound effect on her. From Gabriel Bowman, Sara begins to gather information about the woman who may be her grandmother and her role as an Allied spy during World War II.
5	5	"Legion"	Neill Fearnley	S : Ralph Hemecker; S/T : Richard C. Okie	July 10, 2001	227104
The police arrest a troubled young man, Edward Nolan, for the murder of Monsignor Joe Bellamy. Except for Sara, the police are convinced that he is guilty. She is not ready to assign guilt so quickly, particularly when another priest, Father Del Toro, suggests that Nolan may be possessed. Using the Witchblade, Sara is able to make contact with the dead priest in the same way she can speak to her now dead partner, Danny Woo. She learns that the Vatican may have a particular interest in the Witchblade. But is turns out that Father Del Toro is not what he seems or claims to be. Meanwhile, Sara continues her relationship with Irish singer and poet Conchobar.
6	6	"Maelstrom"	James Whitmore, Jr.	S : Ralph Hemecker; S/T : Richard C. Okie	July 17, 2001	227106
Sara has to rescue her boyfriend, Conchobar, when an Irish gang kidnaps him. The gang are members of the radical Ulster Defense League, a Northern Ireland right-wing group hell-bent on killing terrorists, and they are actually looking for his older brother Edward, a member of the Irish Republican Army (IRA) who reputedly set off 20 car bombs in Belfast in 1996. Sara will stop at nothing to find him, but her late partner, Danny, doesn't approve of her methods. When the kidnappers agree to release Conchobar for a hefty ransom of $2 million, the sole female gang member also demands the Witchblade bracelet. When Kenneth Irons refuses to help her out, Sara seeks to get the money by stealing from the police evidence room.
7	7	"Periculum"	Neill Fearnley	S : Ralph Hemecker & Richard C. Okie; T : Bruce A. Taylor & Roderick Taylor	July 24, 2001	227107
Sara is grieving over the loss of Conchobar and her partner Jake is worried about her well-being. The time has come for Sara to undergo a test of worthiness, the Periculum. In a dream-like state, she meets some of her predecessors who explain the power and origins of the Witchblade and her own role in the world. If she fails the test, she will die. Meanwhile, Captain Dante invites Jake to join a group within the police, called the White Bulls, who ensure that justice is done... and don't hesitate to keep any of the financial proceeds that might come of it.
8	8	"Thanatopsis"	James Whitmore, Jr.	S : Ralph Hemecker; T : Richard C. Okie	July 31, 2001	227108
Captain Dante assigns all of his officers to track and hopefully arrest Armand Parsegian, a known arms dealer. He is assassinated before anything can be done however and Sara has a vision that indicates there is a connection between the murdered man and Kenneth Irons. She also sees Ian Nottingham as the assassin. Meanwhile, Gabriel asks for Sara's help when his best friend is found hanging from the rafters in his apartment building from an apparent suicide. He is convinced that his friend was murdered but again, Sara finds a connection to Irons. Also, Jake decides to accept Dante's offer to join his special group of police officers.
9	9	"Apprehension"	Robert Lee	S : Ralph Hemecker; S/T : Richard C. Okie	August 7, 2001	227109
Sara learns about the White Bulls from her late father who left her a video statement. She also knows who killed Prospero, a local pimp: Detective Orlinsky. She also learns of the long standing feud between Captain Dante and her father. She visits her old Captain, Joe Siri, who tells her of the role the White Bulls and Captain Dante played in her father's death. Kenneth Irons offers to help Sara but she is wary about trusting him, and it turns out that Dante also has powerful friends.
10	10	"Convergence"	James Whitmore, Jr.	S : Richard C. Okie; S/T : Ralph Hemecker	August 14, 2001	227110
With her life in danger from the White Bulls, Sara's not sure who she can trust. Even with partner Jake's revelation, she's not entirely sure she can trust him. Kenneth Irons desperately needs something from Sara or he will face dire consequences when he begins to age at a rapid rate. Meanwhile, Gabriel offers to help Sara by tracing a bullet cartridge, only to get betrayed and finds his own life in danger.
11	11	"Transcendence"	David Jackson	S : Richard C. Okie; S/T : Ralph Hemecker	August 21, 2001	227111
Kenneth Irons tries to get Captain Dante to call off his hunt for Sara, but the Captain is dead set on eliminating her. Meanwhile, Sara and Jake set a trap for Dante but she is shocked when she learns who actually gives the White Bulls their orders. Sara learns of her extraordinary powers and how to use it to right many wrongs. Sara's unlikely protector, Ian Nottingham, surfaces with a life-threatening passion to watch over her that leads to irrevocable consequences. Sara has no choice but to accept the destiny that comes with wielding the gauntlet and use it to regain what she has lost as she sets off to have a final confrontation with Irons after she finally learns what his intentions are for her.

=== Season 2 (2002) ===
No. overall	No. in season	Title	Directed by	Written by	Original release date	Prod. code
12	1	"Emergence"	Joe Chappelle	Ralph Hemecker & Jorge Zamacona	June 16, 2002	227851
Having used the Witchblade's power to reverse time, and Sara and Danny are back at the Rialto Theater (from the premier TV pilot) to confront Tommy Gallo, but Sara turns away, thus preventing the fatal shootout, changing the course of time, and causing great annoyance in Irons, who wanted the Witchblade to bond with Sara through shedding blood. So, he decides to find a new woman to wield the "Blade", and he sets a murderous plot in motion with Ian and his new unholy disciple, Christina, to make it all happen which involves targeting Danny Woo.
13	2	"Destiny"	David Carson	T : Ralph Hemecker; S/T : Jorge Zamacona & William J. Macdonald	June 16, 2002	227852
Using the incredibly strong and powerful powers and abilities of the Witchblade, Sara saves the life of her partner, Danny Woo when he's buried alive. But then Irons procures an ancient weapon, called the Longinus Lance, in order to kill Sara to obtain the Witchblade. She tries to save herself as the battle for the Witchblade turns into a fight to the death. In this new timeline, Sara struggles to know more about the Witchblade which leads her to meeting Gabriel for the first time who gives her some advice, but it puts a strain on her detective partner, Danny, over her refusing to confide in him about what has been going on with her.
14	3	"Agape"	Paul Holahan	Paul Barber & Larry Barber	June 17, 2002	227853
15	4	"Consectatio"	Neill Fearnley	Richard C. Okie	June 24, 2002	227856
Obsessed with his feelings for Sara and driven by the evil spirit of the late Kenneth Irons, Ian Nottingham contracts with a group of deadly assassins, The Black Dragons, who were his former Special Forces unit, to murder Sara.
16	5	"Static"	Neill Fearnley	Larry Barber & Paul Barber	July 1, 2002	227854
When a rock star meets his untimely demise, Sara and Danny are called in on a series of strange homicides. But when Sara discovers that the killer is using a trail of mayhem to lure her into a trap, her investigation turns into a fight for the Witchblade.
17	6	"Nailed"	Rick Rosenthal	Richard C. Okie	July 8, 2002	227855
A psychotic serial killer of young girls (Currie Graham) – who has a fetish for their fingernails – becomes obsessed with Danny's niece. Sara must rely on the Witchblade's visions to find the girl before she becomes the killer's next victim.
18	7	"Lagrimas"	James Whitmore, Jr.	Jorge Zamacona	July 15, 2002	227857
Sara experiences love at first sight when she meets a man who is perfect for her. But the affair goes awry when Irons returns from the grave with knowledge of the man's true identity. Sara is faced with an impossible dilemma of whether she must kill the man she loves.
19	8	"Hierophant"	Paul Holahan	Roderick Taylor & Bruce Taylor	July 22, 2002	227858
A killer known only as V tries to take over New York's organized crime syndicates, causing mayhem. But when the evidence gathered at the crime scenes includes the fingerprints of Sara's long-dead father, Sara must trust the Witchblade's powers to overcome her emotions and wage war with the greatest evil she has ever faced.
20	9	"Veritas"	Paul Abascal	Jorge Zamacona	August 5, 2002	227859
A man named Tickner is on the run from two mysterious men who kill him after he sends a message to Gabriel. It turns out Tickner had a tape with evidence convicting the mysterious men and their organization of some major murder. Gabriel and Sara recover the tape, are forced to shoot two of the men who are government/federal types, and go on the run while Sara has visions of a mysterious Boston-accented man talking to her about politics and evil. Sara ends up captured by the conspirators, who are a mysterious cabal who plan on taking over the U.S. She escapes but the conspiracy lets her live in return for a favor, and they return the captive Gabriel to her.
21	10	"Parabolic"	Anghel Decca	Jenny Beck & Ralph Hemecker	August 12, 2002	227860
A link to unusual circumstances and the mysterious tattoos on the murder victims lead Sara and Jake to investigate other hate crimes that have been interrupted but are occurring across the city. It becomes apparent that a vigilante is trying to thwart the efforts of the hate crime perps. Sara goes undercover to find out more about the tattoos that are traced to the Lupo Organization and its mysterious leader, but when her disguise is blown, she must use the Witchblade to escape.
22	11	"Palindrome"	Paul Holahan	Roderick Taylor & Bruce Taylor	August 19, 2002	227861
Jake and Danny go undercover posing as hot-headed fighters to investigate the murder of a young man who was in an underground bare-knuckle fight club. But the deadly game becomes complicated when Sara's long-lost love, Conchobar, steps into the ring. In a bizarre twist of fate, Sara finds herself falling in love with him (despite having never met him before in this alternate reality) and thus risks everything (including the Witchblade) to save her lover and bring the killer to justice.
23	12	"Ubique"	Bradford May	Richard C. Okie & Ralph Hemecker	August 26, 2002	227862
Sara awakens from a nightmare to discover the Witchblade bracelet gone from her wrist and New York City in chaos after a bizarre homicidal spree. When she finds that the killers recently accessed Cyberfaust.net, a Web site run by someone who knows about the Witchblade, Sara suspects Kenneth Irons. Risking her sanity, she peruses the site and becomes helpless due to Cyberfaust's spell. Sara is forced to battle against the Witchblade and its diabolical new wielder, who is under Irons' employment, but without her special abilities.

== Home media ==
In 2008, Warner Home Video released Witchblade: The Complete Series — a seven-disc collectors set including the original made-for-TV movie, all 24 episodes of the series, and special features — on July 29. For the DVD release the music was altered in many episodes in comparison to the original aired episodes.

Name	Region 1	Region 2	Region 4	Discs
Witchblade: The Complete Series	July 29, 2008	—N/a	—N/a	7

== Reception ==
On Rotten Tomatoes season 1 has a rating of 63% based on reviews from 8 critics, 5 of the reviews were positive, 3 of the reviews were negative. Allan Johnson of The Chicago Tribune praised the show for following seamlessly from the television movie and praising it for translating the cinematic effects to the small screen. Johnson calls it "a nice action series to enjoy in the summer, full of atmospheric characters and situations".

Allan Johnson of The Chicago Tribune gave season 2 a positive review. Johnson notes that although some viewers may be tuning in due to difficulties in Butler's personal life, praises the show for its "sharp visual sense, lurid, high-octane action scenes and a captivating lead in Butler".
