= Angelus (comics) =

American comic character

The Angelus
- Cover of The Darkness #3, art by Marc Silvestri

Publication information
- Publisher: Top Cow Productions
- First appearance: The Darkness #2 (Feb. 1997)
- Created by: Marc Silvestri; David Wohl; Garth Ennis

In-story information
- Alter ego: Lauren Franchetti; Finch; Danielle Baptiste; Jenny Romero; Celestine Wright
- Team affiliations: Angelus Warriors
- Notable aliases: Amaterasu-O-Mi-Kami; Illa
- Abilities: The power to fashion constructs and creatures of light which she can control telepathically. Teleportation as well as the ability to emit destructive light from her body and breathe flame. Supernatural healing and immortality as well as winged armor for flight and super-strength.

The Angelus is an American comic character featured in publications by Top Cow Productions. Initially appearing in the first lineup of The Darkness in 1997, the Angelus has featured as an antagonist and occasional supporting character in issues of The Darkness and Witchblade.

Described as the eternal opposite of the Darkness, as well as essentially being the mother of the Witchblade, the Angelus is a powerful opponent that has challenged both Jackie Estacado and Sara Pezzini on several occasions. She has also made cameos in a few other Top Cow titles.

== Publication history ==
The Angelus played a prominent role in the First Born limited series and had a one-shot by Ian Edginton released in December 2007 as part of the Top Cow Pilot Season event.

== Fictional character biography ==
The Angelus is the antithesis of the Darkness; while those who bear the Darkness are agents of chaos and shadow, those who host the Angelus are avatars of order and light. Unlike her nemesis, the Angelus completely subjugates the personality of its vessel; rendering her fully possessed but also retaining her memories as well as those of all previous hosts. The Angelus was conceived from the light of creation; coming into being as the universe was being formed by God. It immediately resented the Darkness, starting the cosmic war between the two forces. Eventually a truce was agreed upon and the two consummated; conceiving the Witchblade.

Despite being a luminescent spirit of order and divinity, the Angelus is just as ruthless and destructive as her counterpart. The Angelus desires to spread her "light" to the world whether they want it or not. The Angelus will sometimes create a humanoid out of the light as a sexual companion, even spending centuries perfecting them. Recently the Angelus has allowed her hosts control over her powers such as with Danielle Baptiste and Finch, both of whom were allowed to live a normal life until they needed to tap into the power.

== Powers and abilities ==
The Angelus possesses such basic prowess as supernatural strength and resistance to injury as well as flying at high speeds with her wings and teleportation. Like the Darkness, the Angelus can form weapons such as flaming swords or spears as well as armor from her native element which can easily withstand gunfire. Likewise, the Angelus can fashion living beings. These are called Angelus Warriors and usually appear as angelic beings but can also appear mortal. Unlike the more numerous Darklings, Angelus Warriors require considerably more time and effort to bring to life.

One such entity, a mortal concubine created for the Angelus, possesses hypnotic powers of seduction, which she uses to lure her guards into her cell and fatally attack them in order to escape. Her subordinate Warriors exhibit limited teleportation abilities alongside enhanced strength and durability, though they remain less resilient than their mistress and are vulnerable to chemical dissolution as well as Darklings and Darkness-based weaponry.

Unlike the Darkness, the Angelus retains the memories of her previous incarnations. Similarly, the Angelus's abilities and constructs are weakened while in the shadows; although she is not totally powerless. She can see and hear through her servants' eyes as well as breathe fire. As a celestial being, the Angelus can fire powerful waves of raw sunlight to blind or burn her enemies. Even in dark environments, these blasts can obliterate Darklings from a distance. When outraged, the Angelus is known to have destroyed a large island and leveled entire cities.

The Angelus also seems to be able to combine the radiance of both her and her Warriors to intensify their effectiveness. This was shown when they overpowered and banished Glorianna Silver – bearer of the Ember Stone – using their combined light channeled through their spears. An ancient host of the Angelus was also shown to be able to channel the collective souls of an entire host of slain Warriors and infuse them into a dying star to create the Sun Dagger – a blade powerful enough to completely destroy even the most powerful of the Darkness's vessels.

So long as she remains possessed, the Angelus renders its host immortal. However, depending on the age of the body, it will quickly begin to age and decay if depleted of power. This was seen when the first Angelus Jackie fought – nearly a millennium old – began to age into dust. Beyond her supernatural abilities, the Angelus is innately skilled with her weapons. She is a deadly swordswoman and can hold her own against any battle-hardened Darkness wielder, the Magdalena, and even one of her own renegade Warriors who was empowered by the Wheel of Shadows.

== Other media ==
=== Video games ===
The Angelus is absent in The Darkness, with only a few fleeting references to "the light" in the plot. However, she is frequently referenced in The Darkness II - her conflict with the Darkness providing the backstory for many of the collectible relics found throughout the levels. Throughout the course of the story, the Angelus manifests only as visions of Jenny which haunt Jackie. She soon begins recreating whole scenarios, making Jackie relive past moments with Jenny - such as a dance at a diner or a time when they visited a now-abandoned amusement park.

It is not until the post-credits scene that the Angelus is fully revealed. After one final tender moment with Jenny, she is suddenly possessed by the entity - having been under its influence since her death in the first game and been used to lure Jackie into freeing her from Hell. The Angelus transforms Jenny's image into her own and declares her intention to return her light to the world. While Jenny is still within her and still loves Jackie, she also "knows what must be done." She then ascends, leaving a despondent and powerless Jackie stranded in Hell.
