= Water Park Shark =

2026 American sharksploitation film by Anthony C. Ferrante

- Direct-to-video release poster
- Directed by: Anthony C. Ferrante
- Written by: Cody Calahan; Al Kratina
- Story by: Daniel Levin
- Produced by: Adam Scott Epstein; Daniel Levin; Thomas P. Vitale; Nerissa Williams
- Starring: David Chokachi; Chelsea Gilson; Matthew Dame; Kacie Patricia; Michael Shaun Sandy; Snow Feng; Hector Becerra; Brigdon York
- Cinematography: Jeffrey Carolan
- Edited by: Cameron Ames; Anthony C. Ferrante
- Music by: Phantom Lightkeeper
- Production companies: TCGT Entertainment; Chroma; Narrative Pictures
- Distributed by: Fandango at Home
- Release date: 2026
- Running time: 91 minutes
- Country: United States
- Language: English

Water Park Shark is a 2026 American action comedy disaster film directed by Anthony C. Ferrante. A sharksploitation film in the vein of Ferrante's previous work on the Sharknado franchise, it follows a lifeguard (David Chokachi) who must protect guests at a water park from sharks. The film was shot on location in Cape Cod, Massachusetts, where it is set. It was released direct-to-video on July 4th weekend.

== Plot ==
Two employees at the Wicked Waves water park on Cape Cod secretly enter the park after hours and are attacked by a shark that has somehow entered the attraction’s water system.

The following day, Austin Dillard, a former local football star whose career was derailed by a serious leg injury, returns to his hometown and takes a job as a lifeguard at Wicked Waves. He reunites with his former coach, known simply as Coach, and Makhaila Ivy, the park’s head lifeguard. Austin also encounters Makhaila’s older sister, Peyton Ivy, his former girlfriend and the town’s current police chief. Their reunion is strained because Austin left town years earlier and largely cut off contact. The park is owned by Mayor Clark Calhoun, a former classmate of Austin’s who is eager to increase attendance and promote the park’s newly renovated attractions.

Strange incidents soon occur around Wicked Waves, including unexplained electrical surges and problems with the park’s water system. After a blockage is discovered in one of the slides, the workers find a dead shark showing signs of severe electrical damage. Because the park draws some of its water directly from the ocean through underground intake pipes, Peyton orders an investigation into how the animal entered the system. Makhaila later discovers a small shark that has lost its teeth and names it Gums. The animal appears unusually docile, leading the group to suspect that something is affecting the local shark population.

Although the park is temporarily closed, Calhoun pressures Peyton to allow it to reopen after the damaged intake is inspected and the water is treated. Austin remains suspicious, particularly after additional sharks appear inside the pools and slides and attack visitors. He begins connecting the attacks with recurring power failures around the park and town. Austin eventually reveals to Peyton that, after his football career ended, he joined the FBI. He was later forced out after pursuing an investigation without authorization, but information from that case had led him to suspect that something unusual was occurring around Wicked Waves.

Austin, Peyton, Makhaila, Coach, Deputy Jenkins and park employee Rain investigate the electrical disturbances. Utility records show that Wicked Waves is consuming an enormous amount of power, while dead birds, oversized electrical fuses and a blue chemical substance found near the sharks point to a large hidden source of electricity. Tests on the substance reveal chemicals associated with large lithium-ion batteries. Austin realizes that someone may be operating an illegal cryptocurrency-mining installation beneath the park.

The group searches the network of maintenance tunnels underneath Wicked Waves and discovers a large collection of servers and overheating batteries. They also find Dag, a man who has been operating the equipment. The batteries’ cooling system has been leaking contaminated water into the park’s ocean intake system. The combination of the chemicals and powerful electrical fields has affected the sharks’ electroreceptive senses, attracting them toward the park and causing increasingly aggressive and abnormal behavior.

Peyton confronts Calhoun and learns that he arranged the illegal mining operation, using stolen electricity in an attempt to generate a fortune in cryptocurrency. His scheme is responsible for the power surges, toxic runoff and shark attacks. Before Peyton can fully deal with him, several sharks enter the crowded park, forcing the group to evacuate the guests.

Realizing that the mutated sharks could escape back into the ocean and threaten the surrounding coastline, Austin and the others decide to destroy them before they can leave. They seal the park and connect its pools and water system to electrical wiring, intending to use a massive power surge against the sharks and destroy their route through the underground tunnels. Their first attempt fails because Calhoun’s cryptocurrency equipment is consuming too much electricity.

Dag turns against Calhoun and agrees to help destroy the mining operation. The group uses the batteries, explosives and other equipment around the park to create a larger electrical overload. During the confrontation, Calhoun attempts to protect a digital wallet containing the fortune generated by the operation. Meanwhile, Makhaila attempts to save Gums, recognizing that the toothless shark is not behaving like the others.

The group finally triggers the overload, electrocuting the attacking sharks and destroying the underground route they were using to enter and leave Wicked Waves. Gums survives, and the remaining members of the group escape the destruction. With the immediate danger over, Makhaila presents Austin with a gold lifeguard whistle in recognition of his actions. Austin and Peyton reconcile and renew their relationship.

A closing scene suggests that the cryptocurrency operation may have been connected to a larger scheme, with Austin’s former FBI associate Crawford discussing a cover-up and plans involving larger energy operations and additional mining sites.

== Cast ==
- David Chokachi as Coach
- Chelsea Gilson as Peyton Ivy
- Matthew Dame as Austin Dillard
- Kacie Patricia as Makhaila Ivy
- Michael Shaun Sandy as Deputy Jenkins
- Snow Feng as Rain
- Hector Becerra as Clark Calhoun
- Brigdon York as Dag
- Rob Eubanks as Crawford
- Camilla Bastos as Liza
- Brady Leonard as Randall
- Frances Domond as Chelsea
