= Great White Waters =

2025 American action thriller film

- Directed by: Anthony C. Ferrante
- Written by: Anthony C. Ferrante; Geoff Meed
- Starring: Angela Cole; Johnny Ramey; Steve Hanks
- Music by: Tim Carlos; PJ Ramirez
- Production companies: The Asylum; Acme Holding Company; Mini Nation Pictures
- Release date: 2025
- Running time: 93 minutes
- Country: United States
- Language: English

Great White Waters is a 2025 American action thriller film co-written and directed by Anthony C. Ferrante, known for the Sharknado, Blind Waters, and Dante's Hotel films. The film stars Angela Cole, Johnny Ramey, and Steve Hanks. It was released in 2025.

== Plot ==
Gia Shah is a widow who lost her husband in tragic circumstances five years earlier. On the anniversary of his death, she decides to revisit one of their happiest memories: a scuba-diving trip in the Florida Keys. At the same time, Leo Reverend, the leader of a drug cartel, is enraged after a multimillion-dollar shipment of cocaine disappears off the coast of Florida. To recover it, he sends his longtime associate Jareth Danzo along with newcomer Charlotte Harlow to investigate. When they arrive at the drop zone, they discover Gia already diving in the area. Matters worsen when a group of sharks begins infesting the waters, seriously complicating the drug recovery operation.

== Cast ==
- Angela Cole as Gia Shah
- Johnny Ramey as Jareth Danzo
- Steve Hanks as Leo Reverend
- Ashton Leigh as Charlotte Harlow
- Hector Becerra as Teller
- Michael Shaun Sandy as Batton
- Rob Eubanks as Silas
- Michelle Ng Mini as Paulina Lee
- Gerry Laytin as Governor Willis
- Alejandro Cruzet as Calvin
- Stephen Lamar Lewis as Dalton
- Joseph Aviel as Captain Oscar
- Milton Lyles as Rex
- Alessandra Liu as Carrie
- Stephane Fiorenza as Harper
- Jesse Aponte as Luther
- Jonna Kae Volz as Lydia
- Alan Moore as Jim

== Production ==
Writing for iHorror, Timothy Rawles noted that director Anthony C. Ferrante had previously created the Sharknado film series, broadcast on the Syfy channel between 2013 and 2018. The first installment became a pop-culture phenomenon that both parodied and revitalized the killer-shark disaster subgenre, helping establish modern standards for CGI-heavy shark films. The release of Great White Waters coincided with the 50th anniversary of the theatrical release of Jaws.

== Release ==
The film was released in the United States on July 4, 2025, via the streaming service Tubi. It was released in France on July 15, 2025.

== Reception ==
Reception was mixed. A review wrote that it was a ”typically ropey Asylum production that is surprisingly coherent, yet disappointingly dull”. ”If you’re looking for fleshed-out characters or a compelling ‘enemies to accomplices’ arc, look elsewhere. If you enjoy watching unconvincing CGI sharks leap out of the water to gobble down human caricatures, then Great White Waters gets the job done.”, wrote Bloody Disgusting.

== See also ==
- List of killer shark films
