= Dan Halsted =

American film producer

- Born: July 12, 1962 (age 64); New York City, New York, U.S.
- Education: UCLA
- Occupation: Film producer

Dan Halsted (born 1962) is an American film producer and talent manager, best known for producing such films as Garden State, Any Given Sunday and The Virgin Suicides.

== Early life ==
Daniel Halsted was born in New York on July 12, 1962, and moved to Beverly Hills, California in 1976. He graduated from the UCLA with a B.A. in Political Science. His Hollywood career started in 1984 as an assistant to Scott Rudin at 20th Century Fox before later becoming an agent at United Talent Agency (formerly Bauer Benedek Agency).

== Career ==
=== UTA ===
While at 20th Century Fox and UTA, Halsted packaged and sold films such as: There's Something About Mary, New Jack City, The Fabulous Baker Boys, K-9, RoboCop, Casualties of War, Jumpin' Jack Flash, Alien, Predator, and The Untouchables.

=== Hollywood Pictures ===
Halsted left the representation business in 1990 to work at Hollywood Pictures, a division of The Walt Disney Company. While there he oversaw projects such as: The Hand That Rocks the Cradle, Tombstone, Evita, Mr. Holland's Opus, Encino Man, Son in Law, The Joy Luck Club, and While You Were Sleeping.

=== Illusion Entertainment ===
Halsted partnered with filmmaker Oliver Stone in 1995 to create Illusion Entertainment, a joint production company. Together, they produced films such as: Nixon, U Turn, The Art of War, The Corruptor, Beyond Borders, Freeway, Any Given Sunday, and the documentary The Last Days of Kennedy and King for TBS.

=== Halsted Pictures ===
In 1999, Halsted ventured out on his own with Halsted Pictures a multi-year, first-look production deal with Mandalay Pictures. That same year he produced The Virgin Suicides and the action film S.W.A.T. Halsted also executive produced both the TNT television pilot and series Witchblade, and the movie Serving Sara during that time.

One of Halsted's final projects as a full-time producer was the award-winning Garden State. Halsted helped find buyers for the film, which started as a relatively unknown independent and eventually sold for $5 million to Miramax Films and Fox Searchlight Pictures at Sundance 2004.

=== Manage-Ment ===
In 2004, Halsted formed his own company, Manage-ment, representing various film, and television writers and directors. On the film side, Manage-ment clients are known for writing and directing such films as Academy Award-winning Moonlight and Jojo Rabbit, Thor: Ragnarok, Watchmen, The Amazing Spider-Man, Beasts of the Southern Wild, Always Be My Maybe, Beautiful Boy, Twilight, What We Do in the Shadows, Sundance breakout Hunt for the Wilderpeople, and Golden Globe-nominated Neruda. At the end of 2013, Halsted signed a first-look, two-year producing deal with Fox Television Studios. His clients have written, directed and produced for numerous critically acclaimed shows including House of Cards, Breaking Bad, The X-Files, The Americans, Mad Men, The Twilight Zone, Shameless, Narcos, Fear the Walking Dead, The Sopranos, Umbrella Academy, The Marvelous Mrs. Maisel, The Office, This Is Us, Dead to Me, Good Girls Revolt, NCIS, Law & Order: SVU, Sons of Anarchy, 13 Reasons Why, The Leftovers, BoJack Horseman, and Bates Motel.

Manage-ment's roster additionally includes the writers of a number of Pulitzer, Tony and Obie-winning Playwrights including Lynn Nottage, Jon Robin Baitz, Lucy Thurber, and Suzan-Lori Parks. Halsted and Manage-ment also provide equity consulting and investment banking services to financiers, with services provided on such films as Michael Clayton, The Namesake, Garden State, the 2010 Best Documentary Emmy nominee Crips and Bloods: Made in America, and Samsara, the sequel to Baraka. In 2018, managers Nathan Miller and Corinne Hayoun were promoted to partners of Manage-ment.

Nathan Miller has been with the company since 2009 acquiring a roster of clients who have been staffed on shows including The Chi, American Gods, Hannibal, Circe, Homecoming, Swagger, GLOW, Tokyo Vice, Y: The Last Man and Seven Seconds and set up projects at Showtime, AMC, FX, Netflix, Amazon and Hulu. While at Mange-ment, Miller has optioned IP to major networks and studios such as Legendary, Sony, CBS, Big Beach, MRC, Lionsgate, FX, NBC, Paramount TV, and Netflix.

Corinne Hayoun, a former CAA theater agent, joined the company five years ago as head of the New York office. Hayoun has clients with film and TV projects set up at Warner Brothers, Searchlight, HBO, Apple, FX, Amazon, AMC, HBO Max, and BET. Her clients have worked on shows such as the Peabody Award-winning David Makes Man, Emmy-nominated When They See Us, Little America, American Crime Story: Impeachment, Black Lightning, The Chi, and NOS4A2, as well as the Emmy-nominated Netflix documentary Reversing Roe. Hayoun also served as a co-producer on the Broadway play An Act of God starring Jim Parsons, and is a former board member of the Lilly Awards Foundation, which celebrates and advocates for women in the American theatre.

== Filmography ==
Year	Film	Position
2016	The Rendezvous	Producer
2016	People of Earth	Executive Producer
2015	Bleeding Heart	Executive Producer
2015	Stockholm, Pennsylvania	Producer
2015	Eye Candy	Consulting Producer
2014	Learning to Drive	Executive Producer
2013	Over/Under	Executive Producer
2011	Samsara	Consulting Producer
2008	Crips and Bloods: Made in America	Producer
2008	Restraint	Executive Producer
2008	Comedy Gumbo	Executive Producer
2004	Garden State	Producer
2004	Home of Phobia	Producer
2003	Beyond Borders	Producer
2003	S.W.A.T.	Producer
2003	Platinum	Producer
2002	Serving Sara	Producer
2001	The Day Reagan Was Shot	Executive Producer
2001	Witchblade	Executive Producer
2000	The Art of War	Executive Producer
1999	Any Given Sunday	Producer
1999	The Corruptor	Producer
1999	The Virgin Suicides	Producer
1998	The Last Days of Kennedy and King	Executive Producer
1997	Cold Around the Heart	Producer
1997	U Turn	Producer
1996	Freeway	Executive Producer
1995	Nixon	Co-Producer

=== Accolades ===
Year	Award	Category	Nominee(s)	Result	Ref.
2024	Peabody Awards	Entertainment	Reservation Dogs	Won	
2022	Peabody Awards	Entertainment	Our Flag Means Death	Nominated	
