= David Chokachi =

American actor (born 1968)

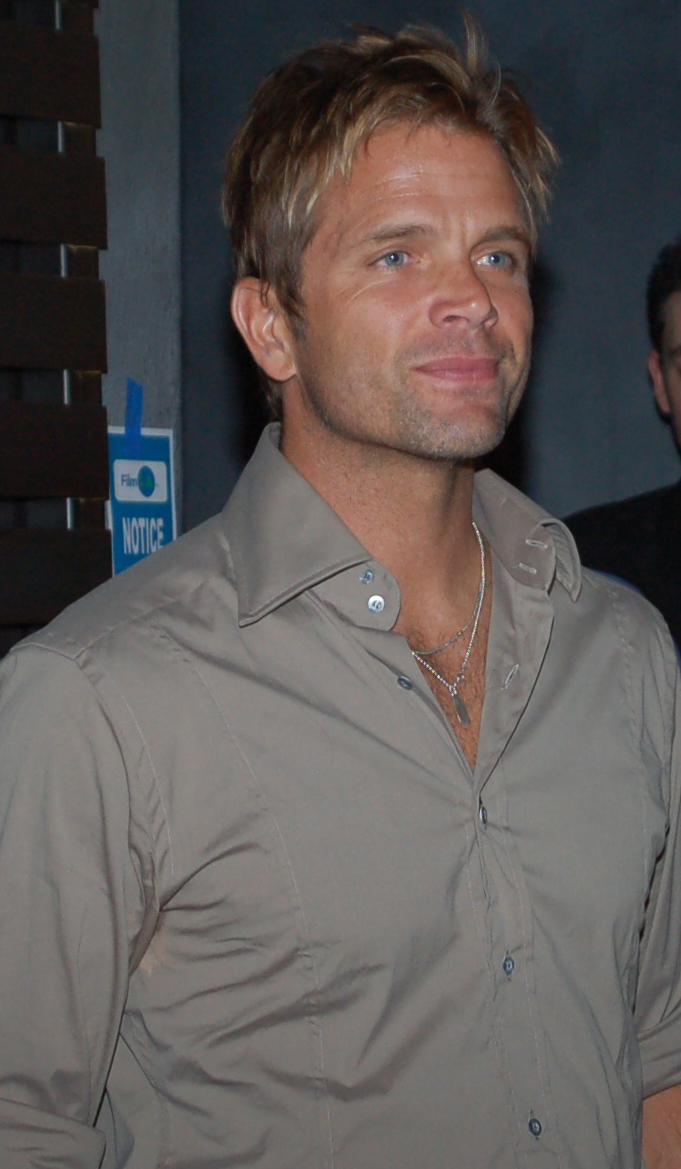
- Chokachi in October 2008
- Born: David Al Chokachi; January 16, 1968 (age 58); Plymouth, Massachusetts, U.S.
- Occupation: Actor
- Years active: 1995–present
- Spouse: Susan Brubaker (2004–present)
- Children: 1

David Chokachi (/ˈtʃoʊkətʃi/ CHOH-kə-chee; born January 16, 1968) is an American film and television actor. He is known for his roles in the TV series Witchblade, Baywatch, and Beyond the Break.

== Early life ==
David Chokachi was born in Plymouth, Massachusetts. His father is of Iraqi Turkmen origin, and his mother is American from Cape Cod, Massachusetts. His maternal grandmother was Finnish from Vaasa, Finland.

He attended Tabor Academy, an elite boarding prep school in Marion, Massachusetts, where he played lacrosse and football. He graduated from Bates College in Lewiston, Maine, with a degree in political science.

== Career ==
Chokachi began his acting career in 1995 at the age of 27 on Baywatch in the role of Cody Madison, eventually replacing David Charvet as a main cast member. In 1999, he left Baywatch and took up the role of Jake McCartey in the TV series Witchblade, which lasted until 2002. Following that, he appeared in various TV series and made-for-TV movies. Chokachi then landed the role of main character Justin Healy on The N's 2006 TV series Beyond The Break. He also appeared on VH1's Confessions of a Teen Idol, a reality show in which former teen idols attempt to revitalize their careers.

Chokachi was one of People magazine's "50 Most Beautiful People in the World" in 1997.

== Filmography ==
Year	Title	Role	Other notes
1995–1999	Baywatch	Cody Madison	
1996	The Unspeakable	Darren Metlick	
1996	Shadow of a Scream		
1997	Suddenly Susan	Elliot	
1997	Sabrina the Teenage Witch	Doug, Sabrina's Ski Instructor	
1997	Bad to the Bone	Waldo	
1998	12 Bucks	Evil Lovejoy	
1998	Baywatch: White Thunder at Glacier Bay	Cody Madison	Direct to video
1999	V.I.P.	Himself	
1999	A Crime of Passion	Eddie Meredith	
2000	Psycho Beach Party	Eddie	
2000	Witchblade	Detective Jake McCartey	
2001–2002	Witchblade	Detective Jake McCartey	
2003	A Crime of Passion		
2003	She Spies	Gordon Braddock/Cable Guy	
2005	Crimson Force	Ambrose	
2006	Beyond the Break	Justin Healy	
2006	Mystery Woman: Oh Baby	Dave	
2006	The Dreamless	Jeff	
2007	Bats: Human Harvest	Captain Russo	
2008	A Date with Murder (Murder Dot Com)	Bobby	
2009	Confessions of a Teen Idol	Himself	Reality TV
2010	Costa Rican Summer	Brad	
2010	The Ascent - Venganza en la cumbre	Robert	
2011	Soul Surfer	Paramedic	
2011	Rage of the Yeti	Jonas	TV movie
2012	Jet Stream	Weatherman	
2013	Atlantic Rim	Red	
2013	Stars in Danger: The High Dive	Himself	Contestant
2013	Roseville	Stephen	
2013	Abner, The Invisible Dog	Denning	
2014	Christmas in Palm Springs	Ian	TV movie
2014	10.0 Earthquake	Reynolds	
2015	Patient Killer		TV movie
2015	Online Abduction	Matt Fletcher	TV movie
2018	A Mother’s Greatest Fear	Steve	TV movie
2022	Adeline	John	
2022	A Hole in Time	Jake	TV movie
2022	As Long as I'm Famous	Gene Tunney	
2024	Shark Warning	Uncle Ron Wetzel	
2025	Predator: Wastelands	Balam	
2026	Water Park Shark	Coach	
