= Boo (2005 film) =

- Theatrical film poster
- Directed by: Anthony C. Ferrante
- Written by: Anthony C. Ferrante
- Produced by: David E. Allen; Sheri Bryant; Harmon Kaslow; Brian Patrick O'Toole
- Starring: Trish Coren; M. Steven Felty; Jilon VanOver; Nicole Rayburn; Josh Holt; Michael Samluk; Rachel Melvin; Dig Wayne; Happy Mahaney
- Cinematography: Carl Bartels
- Edited by: Chris Conlee
- Music by: Alan Howarth; Carey James
- Production companies: Kismet Entertainment Group; Graveyard Filmworks
- Release date: August 2, 2005 (Munich Fantasy Filmfest)
- Country: United States
- Language: English

Boo is a 2005 American horror film directed by Anthony C. Ferrante.

== Plot ==
Jessie Holden is invited by her boyfriend, Kevin, and two friends, Freddy and Marie, to spend one Halloween night at Santa Mira Hospital, abandoned years ago due to a fire. Their friend, Emmett, is preparing the props to scare Jessie when he and his dog, Dutchess, are attacked by a ghost. Meanwhile, Allan is searching for his sister, Meg, who went missing with her friend, Caitlin, in the hospital a few days ago. His father's old friend, former actor-turned-cop Arlo Ray Baines, initially refuses his plea to accompany him to the hospital, but changes his mind and trails him anyway. Allan finds Dutchess horribly mutilated, but she suddenly rises up and attacks him until he shoots and blows her to bits. Upon entering the third floor, he reunites with Meg, who says that she got separated from Caitlin.

Arriving at the hospital, the four friends begin searching for Emmett. When they are alone, Kevin cheats on Jessie by having sex with Marie. Meanwhile, Jessie, who is revealed to be spiritually aware, tells Freddy the story of her late mother, who died due to disease years ago but is still calling her every Halloween. The two stumble upon a terrified Emmett in the locker room. When the five meet up, Emmett suddenly begins attacking them. Allan and Meg arrive in time and Meg uses Allan's gun to shoot Emmett to bits. She tells the group that everyone who die in the hospital are reanimated; Emmett and Dutchess are among them. A paranoid Kevin, suspecting that Marie is becoming a ghost, grabs Allan's gun and shoots her dead.

Since Meg refuses to use the elevator, the group split up, with Jessie, Kevin, and Freddy taking Marie's body to the elevator and Allan and Meg using the stairs. The former three are transported to the third floor, where Jessie has a series of premonitions involving a child murderer named Jacob. Jacob was committed to the hospital's third floor that was specifically reserved for mental patients. Despite this, he managed to murder a little girl in the hospital's premises anyway. When he tried to run away by burning the hospital as distraction, Nurse Russell threw away the door keys, trapping both of them in the fire. Jacob has been killing and reanimating people in the hospital so he can possess them, but all have failed so far. While inspecting the floor, Kevin goes missing.

Jessie and Freddy reunite with Allan, Meg, and Arlo, who has killed a reanimated Caitlin and decided to save them all. They find Kevin trapped by the little girl's spirit and manage to free him, but in the process, Freddy is revealed to have died and was reanimated, forcing Arlo to shoot him. The rest try to escape through the stairs, however, Jessie eventually realizes that until they are able to beat Jacob, he will never allow them to leave. To do it, she impersonates Nurse Russell, intending to scare him from the living world. The plan works. Nevertheless, Jacob uses a reanimated Marie to kill Kevin. Kevin is reanimated, but shows no symptom of a normal ghost. It is revealed that he is directly possessed by Jacob, who finds Kevin, a sociopath, to be a perfect vessel. At the same time, Meg shows herself to be a reanimation; she had died alongside Caitlin back then. However, she is possessed by Russell and retains her control. Russell tells the group to leave while she confronts and successfully subdues Jacob.

Jessie, Allan, and Arlo leave the premises safely, finding out that it is already the noon of All Saints' Day outside. Back at the hospital, Jacob vows to escape, but Russell casually states that he will have to get through her first before turning off the lights.

== Cast ==
- Trish Coren as Jessie Holden
- M. Steven Felty as Jacob
- Jilon VanOver as Kevin
- Nicole Rayburn as Marie
- Josh Holt as Freddy
- Michael Samluk as Allan
- Rachel Melvin as Meg
- Dig Wayne as Arlo Ray Baine/Dynamite Jones
- Happy Mahaney as Emmett
- Dee Wallace as Nurse Russell
- Terri Novak as Jessie’s mom
- Taylor Hurley as The Ghost Girl

== See also ==
- List of films set around Halloween
