= Rage of the Yeti =

- DVD cover
- Written by: Brooks Peck; Craig Engler
- Directed by: David Hewlett
- Starring: David Chokachi; Matthew Kevin Anderson; Yancy Butler
- Theme music composer: Lisa Mazzotte
- Country of origin: United States
- Original language: English

Production
- Producers: Jeffery Beach; John Cappilla; Phillip J. Roth
- Cinematography: Alexander Krumov
- Editor: Matt Michael
- Running time: 86 minutes
- Production company: UFO International Productions

Original release
- Network: Syfy
- Release: November 12, 2011

Rage of the Yeti is a 2011 monster movie by Syfy.

== Plot summary ==
Two groups of treasure hunters, each from all walks of life are dispatched to the Arctic to get items that a wealthy millionaire, Mills is interested in but both groups soon find themselves fighting for their lives as they battle the freezing cold, Russians and a pack of crazed Yetis.

== Cast ==
- David Chokachi as Jonas
- Matthew Kevin Anderson as Jace
- Yancy Butler as Villers
- Laura Haddock as Ashley
- Atanas Srebrev as Eidelman
- David Hewlett as Mills
- Jonas Armstrong as Bill
- James Patric Moran as Ted
- Rosalind Halstead as Lynda
- Emilia Klayn as Laura
- Jesse Steele as Walterson
- Mike Straub as Hedges
- Mark Dymond as Bud
- Kitodar Todorov as The Maitre Di
- Hristo Balabanov as Chopper Guy 1
- Jordan Andonov as Chopper Guy 2
- Igmar Uribe as Guard
- Velislav Pavlov as Pilot
- V.J. Benson as Co-Pilot
