= Stoker Hills =

- Directed by: Benjamin Louis
- Written by: Jonah Kuehner
- Produced by: Benjamin Louis; Jonah Kuehner; Rab Butler; Timothy Christian
- Starring: David Gridley; Vince Hill-Bedford; Eric Etebari; William Lee Scott; Steffani Brass; Tyler Clark; Jason Sweat; Danny Nucci; John Beasley; Tony Todd
- Cinematography: John Orphan
- Production companies: Streetwalkers Productions; Night Fox Entertainment
- Distributed by: Screen Media
- Release date: November 13, 2020 (Molins Horror Film Festival)
- Running time: 91 minutes
- Country: United States
- Language: English

Stoker Hills is a 2020 American mystery horror thriller film written by Jonah Kuehner, directed by Benjamin Louis and starring David Gridley, Vince Hill-Bedford, Eric Etebari, William Lee Scott, Steffani Brass, Tyler Clark, Jason Sweat, Danny Nucci, John Beasley and Tony Todd.

== Cast ==
- David Gridley as Ryan
- Vince Hill-Bedford as Jake
- Steffani Brass as Erica Gallagher
- Eric Etebari as Detective Adams
- William Lee Scott as Detective Bill Stafford
- John Beasley as Dr. Jonathan Brooks
- Tony Todd as Professor Smith
- Danny Nucci as Mark Gallagher
- Tyler Clark as Dani Brooks
- Thomas R. Martin as Officer Martin
- Joy McElveen as Officer York
- Maya Nucci as Emma Gallagher
- Michael Faulkner as Peterson
- Jason Sweat as Charles Moyer

== Production ==
According to cinematographer John Orphan, the forest scenes were filmed in Griffith Park. Orphan claims filming was supposed to have occurred in the Angeles National Forest, but a snowstorm happened there on the week that filming was scheduled to occur.

== Release ==
The film premiered at the Molins Horror Film Festival on November 13, 2020.

In November 2021, it was announced that the U.S. distribution rights to the film were acquired by Screen Media. The film was released in limited theaters and on VOD on January 14, 2022.

== Reception ==
The film has a 17% rating on Rotten Tomatoes based on six reviews.

Starburst gave the film a positive review: "The conclusion might be a tad obvious but it works, although some viewers might feel a little short-changed."

Tyler Doupe of Dread Central awarded the film one and a half stars out of five and wrote, "A discombobulated narrative and frequent gaps in logic make the flick a chore to endure."

Bobby LePire of Film Threat rated the film a 5 out of 10 and wrote, "Stoker Hills is nowhere near being downright terrible, or even all that unwatchable. But, it is disappointing and unremarkable."
