= The Corruptor =

1999 film by James Foley

- Theatrical release poster
- Directed by: James Foley
- Written by: Robert Pucci
- Produced by: Dan Halsted
- Starring: Chow Yun-fat; Mark Wahlberg; Ric Young; Paul Ben-Victor; Byron Mann; Brian Cox
- Cinematography: Juan Ruiz Anchía
- Edited by: Howard E. Smith
- Music by: Carter Burwell
- Production company: Illusion Entertainment Group
- Distributed by: New Line Cinema
- Release date: March 12, 1999
- Running time: 110 minutes
- Country: United States
- Languages: English; Cantonese
- Budget: $25 million
- Box office: $24.5 million

The Corruptor is a 1999 American action film directed by James Foley. The film was written by Robert Pucci, and produced by Dan Halsted. The film stars Chow Yun-fat and Mark Wahlberg. The film was released in the United States on March 12, 1999.

== Plot ==
NYPD Lieutenant Nick Chen is head of the Asian Gang Unit. His job is to keep the peace in Chinatown from a turf war that has broken out between the Tung Fung Benevolent Association tong and the Fukienese Dragons street gang. The problem is complicated by the fact that he is also an informant for the Tongs under Uncle Benny Wong and his lieutenant Henry Lee. After a bombing in Chinatown, Chen is reluctantly teamed up with Danny Wallace, who is unaware of Chen's corruption. Danny was also secretly tasked by Internal Affairs to monitor Chen. Danny lied to Chen and the Asian Gang Unit by claiming that he had taken the job to gain his detective shield quickly.

During a police raid on a Fukienese whorehouse, Chen saves Wallace's life. Wallace, knowing that his life is now in Chen's hands, initiates a bust on a drug operation, not knowing that an undercover FBI agent is involved. After being berated by the FBI for interfering with an ongoing investigation, Wallace is introduced to Lee. Lee discusses the potential value of having another cop in the AGU on the Tong payroll, which Uncle Benny allows. Benny is able to lure Wallace into working for him by tipping him off to an underground prostitution ring. Wallace is given a commendation for valor, but Chen now suspects him working for the Tongs.

Wallace and Chen inadvertently cross paths, throwing their initial trust for each other out the window and putting Lee's intentions into question. Chen hates the Fukienese, but neither he nor Danny knows that Lee is forming a partnership with their leader Bobby Vu. Both Lee and Vu know that there is an FBI agent undercover in their drug operation and decide to kill him.

While monitoring a drug operation, Wallace and Chen witness a violent confrontation with a Tong hit squad that leads to Chen getting berated for botching the FBI investigation. After the incident, Wallace and Chen swear not to talk to the FBI without talking to each other first. The FBI finds out Wallace's real reason for joining the AGU and threatens to expose him unless he is willing to spy on Chen. When Jack, one of Chen's informants, witnesses Vu's assassination of Uncle Benny, Chen alerts the DA, who intends to indict the Tongs under RICO. The DA, the FBI, and both Wallace and Chen decide that they want to catch Vu in the act and decide to hold off on the arrests.

Lee chooses to alert Chen of Wallace's real identity and job. During the nighttime operation, Chen draws his gun on Wallace in anger. Wallace reasons with Chen and the two fight the Dragons, killing most of them. Chen pushes Wallace out of the way and is fatally shot by Vu. Wallace then shoots Vu. While at the hospital, Wallace refuses to withdraw his original statement that Chen died a good cop. Later, Wallace leads the arrest of Lee. Chen is then given a hero's funeral with Wallace in the procession.

== Cast ==
- Chow Yun-fat as Lieutenant Nick Chen
- Mark Wahlberg as Detective Danny Wallace
- Byron Mann as Bobby Vu
- Jon Kit Lee as Jack
- Kim Chan as Benjamin "Uncle Benny" Wong
- Ric Young as Henry Lee
- Paul Ben-Victor as FBI Agent Pete Schabacker
- Bill MacDonald as Internal Affairs Captain Vince Kirkpatrick
- Elizabeth Lindsey as Detective Louise Deng
- Andrew Pang as Detective Willy Ung
- Brian Cox as Sean Wallace
- Tovah Feldshuh as U.S. Attorney Margaret Wheeler
- Beau Starr as Captain Stan Klein
- Mark Williams as Co-Captain
- Susie Trinh as Amy San
- Olivia Yap as Tai
- Lynda Chiu as Kim
- Marie Matiko as May
- Pak-Kwong Ho as Phan Ho
- Chuck Scarborough as Himself

== Soundtrack ==
The soundtrack of The Corruptor features underground hip-hop songs by artists including Mobb Deep, Spice 1 and Mystikal. The original score for The Corruptor contains music composed by Carter Burwell.

== Reception ==
=== Critical reception ===
The movie received mixed reviews from critics and audience. On the review aggregator website Rotten Tomatoes, 48% of 48 critics' reviews are positive. The website's consensus reads: "This uninspiring cop thriller doesn't measure up to Chow Yun-Fat's Hong Kong work." Metacritic, which uses a weighted average, assigned the film a score of 56 out of 100, based on 23 critics, indicating "mixed or average" reviews. Audiences polled by CinemaScore gave the film an average grade of "C+" on an A+ to F scale.

Roger Ebert of the Chicago Sun-Times gave the film one and a half out of four stars and wrote, "Even when it's transplanted to the streets of New York's Chinatown, as The Corruptor is, the Hong Kong action genre has certain obligatory requirements. Low-angle shots of bad guys looming over the camera, for example. And the sound of a metallic whoosh when there's a quick cut from one scene to the next. And what seems like more dialogue during action scenes than before and after them... Director James Foley is obviously not right for this material. It's a shame, actually, that he's even working in the genre since his gift is with the intense study of human behavior..."

=== Box office ===
The Corruptor grossed a total of $24,493,693 worldwide, including $15,164,492 in the United States and $9,329,109 in other territories.
