= William Lee Scott =

American actor

- Born: July 6, 1973 (age 52); Hudson, New York, U.S.
- Occupation: Actor
- Years active: 1996–present
- Spouse: Charlene Bloom (m. 2002)
- Children: 2

William Lee Scott (born July 6, 1973) is an American actor. He is best known for his role as high school student Stanley "Bullethead" Kuznocki on the WB sitcom The Steve Harvey Show. Additionally, he appeared in the films Gone in 60 Seconds, Pearl Harbor, October Sky and The Butterfly Effect.

== Career ==
Scott began his career as a series regular on The Steve Harvey Show, with guest roles in other TV shows such as Fitz and Gun. His first feature film role came as the younger version of Loren Dean's character in Andrew Nicolas' Gattaca. He can also be seen as Hank in the TV movie Before Women Had Wings and as Randy in the independent picture The Opposite of Sex. In 1999, Scott starred in October Sky as Roy Lee Cooke. He also had a role in the 2000 film Gone in 60 Seconds. In 2007, he guest starred in Criminal Minds in the episode "Children of the Dark." In January 2016, he reunited with his co-star Steve Harvey for his birthday show on his self-titled talk show during the segment of "Ask Steve". In 2021, Scott reunited with his former Steve Harvey show co-star Cedric the Entertainer on CBS' The Neighborhood on the season 3 episode "Welcome to the Dad Band".

== Filmography ==
=== Film ===
Year	Title	Role	Notes
1997	Gattaca	Young Anton	
1997	Before Women Had Wings	Hank Jackson	TV movie
1998	The Opposite of Sex	Randy Cates	
1998	Tis the Season	Zach	Short
1999	October Sky	Roy Lee	
1999	Black and White	Will King	
2000	Gone in 60 Seconds	Toby	
2001	Pearl Harbor	Billy	
2003	Identity	Lou	
2003	Dumb and Dumberer: When Harry Met Lloyd	Carl	
2004	The Butterfly Effect	Tommy	
2004	Killer Diller	Wesley	
2004	The Winning Season	Ty Cobb	TV movie
2004	$5.15/Hr.		TV movie
2006	Beautiful Dreamer	Clay	
2006	The Novice	Henry	
2006	Twenty Questions	Peter Burnet	TV movie
2007	The Go-Getter	Rid	
2008	Farm House	Chad	
2009	Brooklyn's Finest	Officer	
2009	Nine Dead	Jackson	
2010	Madso's War	Lep Quinn	TV movie
2012	A Feeling from Within	Kevin Scully	
2013	Burning Blue	Charlie Trumbo	
2014	Talking Points	Narrator (voice)	Short
2016	Let Me Make You a Martyr	Jamie	
2016	The Magnificent Seven	Moody	
2018	The Brawler	Artie Stock	
2020	Stoker Hills	Detective Bill Stafford	

=== Television ===
Year	Title	Role	Notes
1996–2002	The Steve Harvey Show	Stanley 'Bullethead' Kuznocki	Main cast
1997	Gun	The Skinhead	Episode: "Ricochet"
1997	Cracker	Jeremy Falls	Episode: "Sons and Lovers"
2003	CSI: Miami	DJ Scorpius	Episode: "Tinder Box"
2007	Criminal Minds	Gary	Episode: "Children of the Dark"
2008	ER	Jordan	Episode: "Owner of a Broken Heart"
2009	CSI: Crime Scene Investigation	Jeffrey Luvan	Episode: "Kill Me if You Can"
2010	Chase	Bob McGraw	Episode: "The Posse"
2021	The Neighborhood	Brett	Episode: "Welcome to the Dad Band"
