= Anthony C. Ferrante =

American film director

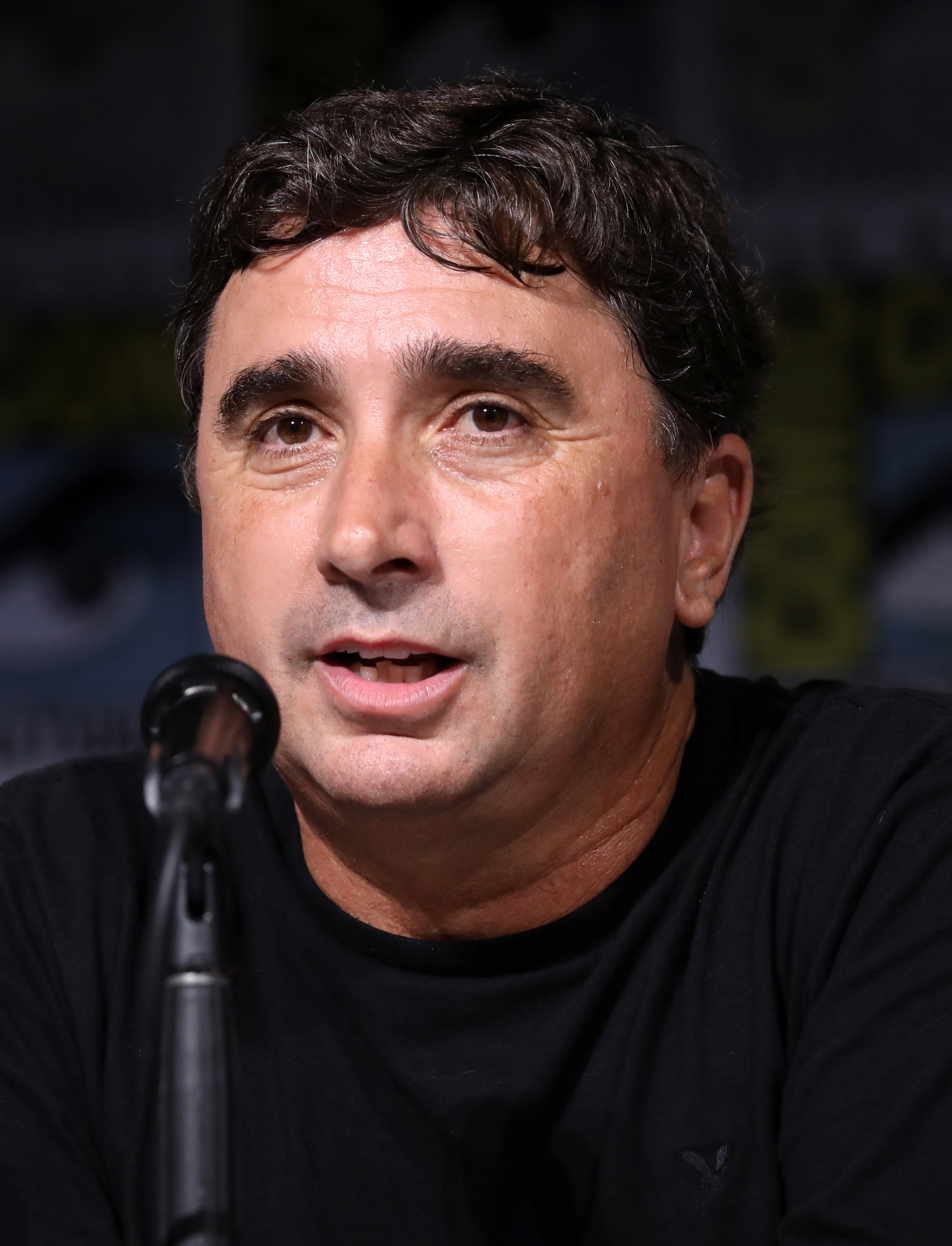
- Ferrante in 2023
- Born: Antioch, California, U.S.
- Education: Los Medanos College (AA); San Francisco State University (BA)
- Occupations: Film director; film producer; screenwriter

Anthony C. Ferrante is an American film director, producer, and writer, known for directing the Sharknado series, the 2017 thriller Forgotten Evil and the 2005 ghost story Boo, which was his feature film writing and directing debut.

== Career ==
Ferrante grew up in Antioch, California. When he was attending Antioch High School, he took a film studies class at Los Medanos College. His first film was shot at the El Campanil Theatre. He would later get his bachelor arts degree in film studies at San Francisco State.

In addition to his film career, he has written a comic, Archie vs. Sharknado, which is a tie-in to Sharknado 3: Oh Hell No! and is illustrated by Dan Parent. He also formed the band Quint with actor / musician Robbie Rist. They have written and performed songs for every Sharknado movie including the theme song "(The Ballad of) Sharknado". Before moving to movies full-time, Ferrante was the editor-in-chief of (the now defunct) Cinescape magazine and a writer for Fangoria.

== Filmography ==
Year	Film	Director	(Executive) Producer	Writer	Actor	Role	Notes
1987	The Video Dead				Yes	A zombie	Direct-to-video
1997	God Talk	Yes	Yes	Yes			Short film
2000	The Dead Hate the Living!				Yes	Store customer	Direct-to-video
2001	The Surreal World	Yes	Yes	Yes			Short film
2002	Scarecrow		Yes		Yes	Jake	Direct-to-video
2003	The Revolting Dead		Yes		Yes	Construction worker	Direct-to-video
2004	Scarecrow Slayer		Yes				Direct-to-video
2005	Boo	Yes		Yes			
2007	Headless Horseman	Yes		Yes			
2009	The Five Stages of Grief of a TV Guest Star	Yes		Yes			Short film
2010	Para-Homeless Activity	Yes		Yes			Short film
2010	House of Bones			Yes			
2011	Scream of the Banshee		Yes	Yes			
2012	Red Clover		Yes	Yes			Also known as "Leprechaun's Revenge"
2012	Ghostquake			Yes			Also known as "Haunted High"
2012	American Horror House			Yes			
2013	Hansel & Gretel	Yes					
2013	Attila			Yes	Yes	John McVie	
2013	Sharknado	Yes					
2013	Hello Hero: Holding Out for a Hero	Yes		Yes			
2014
2014	Sharknado 2: The Second One	Yes			Yes	Guy with Guitar	
2015	Sharknado 3: Oh Hell No!	Yes			Yes	NASA Launch Director Marymee	
2016	Sharknado: The 4th Awakens	Yes			Yes	Fenwick	
2017	Forgotten Evil	Yes		Yes			
2017	Sharknado 5: Global Swarming	Yes			Yes	Dundee	
2018	The Last Sharknado: It's About Time	Yes			Yes	Quint Singer	
2019	Zombie Tidal Wave	Yes		Yes			
2020	Stalked by My Husband's Ex	Yes					TV Movie
2020	Beaus of Holly	Yes					TV Movie
2022	Framed by My Sister	Yes					TV Movie
2022	Time Pirates	Yes					
2022	Nix	Yes	Yes	Yes			
2022	Crown Prince of Christmas	Yes		Yes			TV Movie
2023	Butch Cassidy and the Wild Bunch	Yes					
2025	Great White Waters	Yes		Yes			Direct-to-video
2026	Water Park Shark	Yes					Direct-to-video
