= The Darkness (character) =

American comic book superhero

- The Darkness issue #1. Art by Marc Silvestri

Publication information
- Publisher: Top Cow Productions (Image Comics)
- First appearance: Witchblade #10 (Nov. 1996)
- Created by: David Wohl; Marc Silvestri; Garth Ennis

In-story information
- Alter ego: Jackie Estacado
- Team affiliations: Franchetti crime family Darklings; Sierra Muñoz
- Notable aliases: Jack Estacado Jack Estes El 'Ocaso The Darkness Darkman Jackie Darko Antichrist
- Abilities: Access to an otherworldly dimension and control over the demons that dwell there. Can teleport through the shadows and manifest armor to increase his strength and enable shapeshifting. His body heals supernaturally. A skilled marksman and physical combatant Trained in chemistry

The Darkness (Jackie Estacado) is a superhero created by Marc Silvestri, Garth Ennis, and David Wohl, who first appeared in Witchblade #10 (Nov. 1996), published by Top Cow Productions (an imprint of Image Comics). Jackie Estacado is a New York mafioso who, after turning 21, inherits the curse of the Darkness.

== Publication history ==
The Darkness debuted in Witchblade #10 (Nov. 1996) by Marc Silvestri, Garth Ennis, and David Wohl. The comics series The Darkness ran from December 1996 to August 2001. Volume 2 ran from December 2002 to November 2005. Volume 3 ran from December 2007 to December 2013.

== Fictional biography ==
=== The Darkness ===
The Darkness is a supernatural force older than the Earth itself which acts as a driving catalyst for much of the events in the story. Drawing on the Biblical account of creation as described in Genesis, the Darkness is the chaos that existed prior to God's light.

As the universe took shape in the void, the Darkness grew to resent God and his creation. Conjuring an endless legion of demonic creatures, the Darkness declared war upon the light itself - now embodied as the Angelus. This lasted for eons until an armistice was reached to prevent mutual destruction; to seal the truce, the two powers mated and conceived the Witchblade to act as a balancing element between them.

Sometime after this, the Darkness began inhabiting human vessels using the sons of a chosen bloodline; the father passing the curse to his offspring at the moment of conception - dying as the Darkness departed his body. The power then awakens on the son's 21st birthday.

A wielder of the Darkness has been present in every major time period and continental power in history. These hosts are usually predisposed to be violent and thus have been dictators, murderers, thieves and abusers of every variety with minimal exceptions.

While the Estacado family is the most prolific and enduring bloodline to carry the curse, they’re not the only lineage to wield the Darkness; with Aram - an African warlord and witch-king who appears later in the series - being the only example of a host who willingly took the curse into himself (and later expelled it) rather than being born with it.

=== Jackie Estacado ===
Jackie Estacado is the vessel of the Darkness for the first run of the series. He is depicted as an antihero; often aligned with evil, but sometimes with remorse. He states his ethos in Vol. 2, #5: "My whole life I've been kicked around, you know? I don't know how to do anything but kick back".

The son of notorious mob associate Danny Estacado and an unnamed prostitute, Jackie is taken in by Saint Gerald's Orphanage, where he is frequently abused by the orderlies. Despite his antisocial nature, Jackie protects his friend Jenny from their cruel treatment. At the age of six, Jackie is adopted by up-and-coming mob boss Frankie "Kill-The-Children-Too" Franchetti, who claims to be his uncle. Frankie does this after being persuaded by Sonatine of the Brotherhood of Darkness that bringing Jackie into his inner circle will make him powerful.

Raised as a hitman for the Franchetti mob family, Jackie has a penchant for murder and promiscuity. Despite his criminal lifestyle, Jackie follows a strict moral code of trust in those who earn it and fierce loyalty to family and allies. Early in the series, his main love interest is his childhood friend Jenny Romano. He later develops a romance with Sara Pezzini after the birth of their daughter, Hope Pezzini.

Life in the mob provides Jackie with a home and as a sense of safety and family, but also makes him more violent and prone to illegal activity. Losing his virginity at age fourteen to a female police officer during an interrogation, he disregards the law and develops a sex habit. Completing his first hit at age sixteen, Jackie soon becomes Frankie's chief enforcer, skyrocketing the Franchetti family into one of the top mob families in New York City. Jackie often visits Jenny's club to keep in touch.

Both the Angelus and Sonatine watch over Jackie throughout his life, waiting for him to manifest the Darkness – the Brotherhood wishing to exploit his power and the Angelus wishing to annihilate the wielder at his most vulnerable. Jackie is also watched by followers of the Church of the Angelus who have infiltrated various criminal operations. Among them is Regis Tyne, a mob accountant who associates with Jackie and attempts to assassinate him over a decade later.

When he turns 21, his dark powers awaken and he learns of his evil heritage. Jackie spend much of his time escaping from or fighting the Angelus and the Brotherhood of the Darkness. Jackie tries to quit the mob and Frankie kidnaps and kills Jenny. Jackie blows up a warehouse with Franchetti's crew in it, killing Frankie and burning himself alive. Jackie spends two days wandering around Hell searching for Jenny until the former priest Tom Judge, bearer of an artifact called "the Rapture," comes and gives him hope, allowing him to exit Hell. Jackie's body is then reconstructed by the Darkness.

Jackie returns to find the Franchetti mob taken over by Frankie's cousin, Paulie. Paulie discovers Jackie's secret and blackmails Jackie into doing hits for him. Jackie turns on Paulie and takes control of the Franchetti family, fighting the Russian mafia in Atlantic City, where he is seduced by a woman created by his own unconscious. Siding with the Magdalena (the bearer of another artifact, the Spear of Destiny), he confronts the Angelus.

After an attack by the Angelus's army on the Franchetti family, Jackie learns from an Angelus warrior that detective Sara Pezzini, former bearer of the Witchblade, is pregnant and that he is the father of the unborn baby. The Darkness, tired of the truce between the Light and the Darkness, had mind-controlled Jackie to have sex with Sara while she was in coma. The Angelus tries to get the baby to win the war. Jackie and Danielle Baptiste, the new bearer of the Witchblade, defend Sara from an attack by the Angelus's army and get her to a safe house in a cavern. The Angelus army attacks again, defeating Jackie and the Magdalena, but they buy Sara enough time to give birth. Sara dies in the process, but her daughter's power brings her to life again, giving her half of the power of the Witchblade, Dani keeping the other half. The Angelus defeats Sara and Dani, but is vanquished by the baby. Sara names her daughter Hope.

Jackie meets chemical engineer Professor Kirchner, who helps him develop his darkness abilities. Jackie usurps the power in the fictional banana republic of Sierra Muñoz, South America, in hopes of establishing a new empire. Jackie establishes a drug cartel in Sierra Muñoz with a narcotic made from his own bodily fluids, builds an impenetrable fortress, forms an army, and takes a lover, not knowing Kirchner is controlling her. The residents of Sierra Muñoz resist Jackie's takeover with the help of the U.S. Department of Defense, which wants to capture Jackie for experimentation. He defeats them, but Kirchner and his pregnant lover turn against him, and she takes control of the Darkness, taking it from him. Dying, Jackie regains the Darkness by pure willpower. Confronting Kirchner, he learns that the baby is already born, and that it is an incarnation of the Darkness without human flaws like a conscience. It attacks him, but Jackie defeats it.

Jackie heads back to the United States, surviving an encounter with a dream-stealing witch in Mexico. He is captured by a devil named the Sovereign. The devil tells Jackie that when he went to hell, Jackie made a deal with the Sovereign, who promised, in return for several assassinations, to reunite Jackie's body and soul. Jackie fulfills the Sovereign's demands, killing a possessed nun, an immortal drug dealer, and a 10-year-old African warlord.

He visits New York, where he punishes some thugs of the Franchetti mob who caused the death of a 5-year-old girl and visits Sara and his daughter. The antagonists Glacier Stone and Ember Stone are introduced, Jackie learns that there is a total of 13 artifacts, and Jackie kills the current incarnation of the Angelus, and has his first kiss with Sara. The new bearer of the Glacier Stone, and of another artifact, the Sword of Blood, is Michael Finnigan, an Irish mobster Jackie hired to watch over Sara and Hope. Months after this, he saves Jackie, who was captured by a revenge driven Egyptian mob.

During Jackie's missions for the Sovereign, he encounters a woman with a red ribbon who intrigues him. He also meets a past Darkness wielder named Aram, also known as the Foreigner, who explains that the Sovereign has been manipulating Jackie from the start and that his soul and the Darkness are still in him, repressed by his desire to be free of the Darkness's influence. Ignoring the Foreigner, Jackie follows the woman and faces a resurrected djinn created by a shaman to kill Darkness wielders. Finding the djinn to be virtually invincible, Jackie is guided to strangle the woman to death with her own ribbon, breaking the curse of the djinn and freeing the woman from eternal servitude. Jackie is confronted by Aram, who intimidates him into summoning the full power of the Darkness. Aram disappears and Jackie realizes the Sovereign's manipulations and intent on revenge with full control of his powers.

Jackie attacks the Sovereign, chases him away from his base, and conquers it for himself. He finds a list of statues of the Sovereign; to destroy all of them he gathers a crew of thieves, smugglers, and fighters, beginning with Leonard Kim, a surviving member of the Sovereign's mercenaries. He has to escape from a team of government killers with the help of an army officer who decides that Jackie's abilities should not be replicated. He walks into a trap that a Russian mafioso built with the help of a traitor on his team, which lures him with images of his sister Capris; he escapes from a machine that feeds on his magic energy. Next, he has to deal with a second traitor in his team, mob accountant Regis Tyne, a sleeper agent of a fanatical human Angelus army, who decides not to kill Jackie because there could be worse bearers to the Darkness, but is still killed by a surprised Jackie. He revives Regis with the help of the Darkness, now controlling him, hears his story and let him continue as part of the crew. In the last confrontation with the Sovereign, Jackie and his team, ensnared in illusion spells, win because of Leonard Kim's sacrifice. Leonard declines Jackie's offer to heal him with the Darkness.

== Powers and abilities ==
The Darkness is an elemental force of chaos and creation. A Darkness wielder accesses another dimension through the shadows around them and exerts control over the demonic creatures that dwell there. These creatures, called Darklings, usually appear as serpentine or goblinoid fiends that can communicate with their master through telepathy. They possess supernatural strength and stamina as well as deadly claws and fangs.

Darklings emerge in different forms depending on the needs of their host. Some Darklings have wings and others can breathe fire. Darklings have also exhibited the ability to easily adhere to sheer surfaces as well as teleport through shadows with their bearer and produce corrosive chemicals through their saliva or excrement. While beholden to their vessel, Darklings do exhibit their own autonomy.

In battle, Darkness wielders envelop their bodies in an armor of shadowy metal. This gives them strength and durability as well as razored fingers and bladed tendrils emerging from their shoulders which can transform into wings. With practice, the wielder can use their armor to shapeshift. They can also instinctively fashion weapons and shields from their armor.

When a wielder is injured, the shadows surrounding them are absorbed into their body to regenerate cells at unnatural rates, even to regrow lost limbs. This renders the vessels impervious to disease and poisons as well as resistant to supernatural afflictions. This also allows them a degree of pseudo-immortality as the Darkness keeps them preserved over millennia.

Darkness bearers are typically hardened individuals whose lives have endowed them with considerable fighting prowess and survival skills. Wielders from older time periods were usually skilled swordsmen while modern hosts like Jackie are skilled marksmen. Jackie was trained in chemistry by Kirchner, enabling him to convert Darkness into water, corrosives, or narcotics.

== Significant characters ==
Angelus

The antithesis of the Darkness, the Angelus is a common enemy in the series. While Jackie's first confrontation with the entity ended with him victorious, Sonatine would later conjure the spirit in hopes of driving it to possess Appolonia Franchetti in their mutual desire to take vengeance on Estacado. Instead, it inhabited the body of the latter's catatonic mother, Lauren. Jackie managed to escape this encounter by creating a doppelganger of himself from the Darkness.
Returning some time after Frankie's death, the Angelus would again seek out Jackie - now boss of the Franchetti family. At the same time, the newest Magdalena - Patience - was assigned to assassinate Jackie. During her hunt, she encountered the Angelus and followed her to Estacado. As Patience subdued Jackie, the Angelus took advantage and attacked. He was able to lure her into a tunnel to weaken her enough for Appolonia to kill her with the Spear of Destiny. The power then possessed Patience for only a few moments before being exorcised through sheer will.

Appolonia Franchetti

The daughter of Frankie and Lauren Franchetti and Jackie's adoptive cousin. When she was a child, she witness her father brutally torture and murder her mother's lover. The trauma of this experience led to Appolonia's resentment of Frankie as well as her own antisocial behaviors. Growing up with Jackie, they both grew to hate each other; him for Franchetti's attention and her for her petty cruelty. Estacado was Frankie's golden boy while he more or less ignored Appolonia and her now-catatonic mother. She eventually left New York to study abroad in Europe.
Appolonia returned to the States shortly after Jackie inherited the Darkness. Bent on revenge and determined to take over the Franchetti Family without Estacado, she had Wenders kidnapped and tortured until he revealed everything he knew about Jackie, his powers, and the Angelus. Collaborating with Sonatine, she planned to become the next Angelus host. This plan misfired when the spirit inhabited her mother instead. She was left in a coma following this encounter and was only resuscitated back to consciousness by the severed blade of the Spear of Destiny.

Aram

The oldest recorded host of the Darkness, Aram the Witch-King was a sovereign and warlock of Ancient Africa some ten thousand years prior to the Common Era. Willingly letting the curse into his body, he used its power to take entire regions of land to sate his lust for conquest. At some point after becoming disgusted with his cruelty, he used his mastery of sorcery to exorcise the Darkness from his body. Although effectively free from the curse, the Darkness condemned him with immortality; promising that he would wander the Earth until he let it back in.
Over the centuries, Aram - known by then only as the Foreigner - would travel the globe watching over Darkness hosts from a distance. At some point during his trek, he would encounter and slay a djinn created to kill Darkness bearers and outwit the Sovereign.

Capris Castiglione

Jackie's twin sister and a minor ally in the first volume of the series and later a primary antagonist in or around the last volume. Separated from her sibling at birth, Capris inherited only a small portion of the Darkness's power - being one of the only women to bear the curse. Raised by Father Brendan, Capris lived an idyllic life. This all ended after her 18th birthday when she found her longtime friend and college roommate - Blaire Dray - dead from an apparent suicide. It's soon found out that Blaire was murdered as a cover for an illegal porn racket.
Capris made her last appearance in the Outer Darkness storyline, where it was revealed that she had become fully seduced by the euphoric power of the Darkness and had been training and perfecting her powers. The Darkness chose her to be his new host and used her to try to kill Jackie. She attacked and overpowered him with her superior powers and would have killed him if not for Aram using his last bit of magic to shut down the Darkness. Jackie killed Capris using a magical crystal glove given to him by Aram. She is last seen as a damned soul in a strange afterlife for Darkness-wielders.
While she did manifest Darkness powers upon turning 21, Capris's abilities were significantly less than those of her brother when she first appeared in the series. She seemed to function as a repository of power which Jackie drew on during their encounter with the Cherub Hostile. She initially only showcased increased strength and resilience as well as the ability to conjure tendrils from the surrounding shadows. Over a decade later, her powers expanded exponentially to the point of manifesting her own armor and creating zombies by feeding them her blood.

The Doppleganger

An evil clone of Jackie created by the Darkness after Aram purged him from it.

Sonatine

The leader of the Brotherhood of Darkness and a recurring antagonist early in the series. Having followed Jackie's bloodline since the days of their founder - Miguel Estacado - Sonatine was obsessed with remaking the world in the image he desired using the powers of the Darkness. Sonatine first met Jackie after he manifested the curse. While initially presenting himself as a mentor, Jackie's refusal led to the Brotherhood kidnapping Jenny to force his cooperation. However, this plan backfired when the Angelus arrived, and they were forced to work together.
Sonatine's knowledge of the occult allowed him a degree of arcane ability and a prolonged lifespan. He carried a star talisman that compelled people to believe anything he said or to answer any question truthfully. It could also create light powerful enough to frighten Darklings. He was also schooled in ceremonial magic and possession. These were showcased when he ritualistically conjured the presence of the Angelus in an attempt to enslave its power, and later after being gravely wounded he transferred his consciousness into one of his servants, Wenders.

Sovereign

The Sovereign was the Emperor of Rome roughly three thousand years prior to the Common Era. His reign was short-lived as he and his family were murdered by a bearer of the Darkness. Sentenced to Hell for his cruelties in life, he managed to deceive an angel into freeing his soul. Bargaining with the Fates to be spared an eternity of torture, he became a custodian of souls sent to Hell. Able to enter the living world only by possessing statues made in his image, the Sovereign became obsessed with taking revenge of any vessel of the Darkness he encountered.

Jenny Romano

The childhood friend and girlfriend of Jackie.

Frankie Franchetti

Frankie is one of the main antagonists of the series and a vicious mobster.

The Magdalena

Descended from Mary Magdalene and Jesus Christ, The Magdalena is an assassin born and bred to serve the Vatican in times of duress.

Nino Wenders

A manservant of the Darkness working for Sontaine, who Jackie forces to help him battle the Angelus. He later becomes romantically obsessed with Jackie, who regards Wenders as cowardly and untrustworthy.

Angelus Warriors

Servants of the Angeleous.

Elle

An artificial human who becomes Jackie's companion.

Paulie Franchetti

The cousin of Frankie Franchetti and the Don of the Franchetti crime family after Jackie kills his cousin. Paulie is a vicious psychopath who has no morals, empathy, or regard for the lives of others. He has an extremely short temper, engaging in brutal retaliation against even the slightest offense.

The Brotherhood of the Darkness

A recurring antagonistic faction for the first half of the series, the Brotherhood is a cult that worships the Darkness; less out of genuine reverence and more so out of a desire to use its power to reshape the world to their liking.

== In other media ==
=== Film ===
In December 2004, Dimension Films paid an undisclosed six-figure sum to develop a movie based on the comic, with a planned release for 2008. The film rights were later sold to the Pang brothers in December 2005.

At Comic-Con 2009, Top Cow president Matt Hawkins revealed that a live-action The Darkness film was in development, with Scott Stuber Productions attached as the producer for the project. In 2012, Len Wiseman signed on to produce the movie.

=== Video games ===
A game based on The Darkness was released for the PlayStation 3 on June 20, 2007, and for the Xbox 360 eight days later. Developed by Starbreeze Studios and published by 2K Games, the game follows a differing version of the story and gives more characterization to the Darkness.

A sequel, titled The Darkness II, was released for the PC, the Xbox 360 and the PlayStation 3 on February 7, 2012, developed by Digital Extremes and published by 2K Games.

== Collected editions ==
The series has been collected into a series of trade paperbacks:

- Volume 1 (1996–2001):
  - Coming of Age (176 pages, collects The Darkness preview and The Darkness #1–6, 1998, ISBN 1-58240-032-6)
  - Ultimate Collection (352 pages, collects The Darkness #1–6 and #40, Volume 2 #1–6, 2007, ISBN 1-58240-780-0)
  - Heart of Darkness (144 pages, collects The Darkness #7–8, 11–14, 2001, ISBN 1-58240-205-1)
  - Spear of Destiny (106 pages, collects The Darkness #15–18, 2000, ISBN 1-58240-147-0)
  - Original Sin (166 pages, collects The Darkness #15–25, 2005, ISBN 1-58240-459-3)
  - Flesh and Blood (464 pages, collects The Darkness #26–39, October 2005, ISBN 1-58240-538-7)
  - Compendium 1 (1280 pages, collects The Darkness #1–40, Tales of the Darkness #1–4 and Darkness: Wanted Dead, December 2006, ISBN 1-58240-643-X, November 2007, ISBN 1-58240-801-7)
  - Origins Volume 1 (176 pages, collects #½-6, ISBN 978-1-60706-097-0)
  - Origins Volume 2 (176 pages, collects #7-10, Witchblade issues #18–19, ISBN 978-1-60706-103-8)
  - Origins Volume 3 (208 pages, collects #11–18, ISBN 978-1-60706-208-0)
  - Origins Volume 4 (176 pages, collects #19–25, ISBN 978-1-60706-549-4)
- Volume 2 (2002–2005):
  - Resurrection (176 pages, collects The Darkness Volume 1 #40, Volume 2 #1–6, 2004, ISBN 1-58240-349-X)
  - Demon Inside (272 pages, collects The Darkness #7–16 and Darkness: Wanted Dead, January 2007, ISBN 1-58240-646-4)
  - Depths Of Hell (224 pages, collects The Darkness #17–24, September 2007, ISBN 1-58240-795-9)
- The Darkness Vs. Eva – Daughter of Dracula (104 pages, collects The Darkness Vs. Eva #1–4, 2008, ISBN 1-933305-85-1)
- Top Cow/Marvel: The Crossover Collection Vol. 1 (304 pages, collects Devil's Reign #1–8, Wolverine/Witchblade, The Hulk/The Darkness, ISBN 978-1-58240-533-9)
- DC/Top Cow Crossovers (200 pages, collects The Darkness/Batman, The Darkness/Superman, JLA/Cyberforce & JLA/Witchblade, ISBN 978-1-4012-1338-1)
- Unholy Union (Marvel Comics crossover: featuring the Hulk, the Darkness, Ghost Rider, Witchblade, & Dr. Strange).
- First Born (160 pages, First Born #0–3, ISBN 978-1-58240-854-5)
- Broken Trinity (208 pages, Broken Trinity #1–3, The Darkness one-shot, Angelus one-shot, Witchblade one-shot, ISBN 978-1-60706-051-2)
- Compendium 2 (collects The Darkness #41–89, The Darkness: Lodbrok's Hand one-shot, The Darkness: Shadows And Flame one-shot, The Darkness: Butcher one-shot, ISBN 1-60706-403-0)
- Volume 3 (2008–2012):
  - Accursed: Volume 1 (160 pages, collects The Darkness #1–6, September 2008, ISBN 1-58240-958-7)
  - Accursed: Volume 2 (140 pages, collects The Darkness #7–10, 75 October 2009, ISBN 1-60706-044-2)
  - Accursed: Volume 3 (160 pages, collects The Darkness #76–79 and Tales of the Darkness: Lodbrok's Hand one-shot, June 2010, ISBN 1-60706-100-7)
  - Accursed: Volume 4 (172 pages, collects The Darkness #80–84 and The Darkness: Shadows and Flame one-shot, December 2010, ISBN 1-60706-194-5)
  - Accursed: Volume 5 (160 pages, collects The Darkness #85–89, November 2011, ISBN 1-60706-216-X)
  - Accursed: Volume 6 (160 pages, collects The Darkness #90–95, March 2012, ISBN 1-60706-495-2)
  - Accursed: Volume 7 (160 pages, collects The Darkness #96–100, April 2012, ISBN 1-60706-517-7)
- Rebirth (2012–2013)
  - Rebirth: Volume 1 (160 pages, collects The Darkness #101–105, September 2012, ISBN 1-60706-585-1)
  - Rebirth: Volume 2 (160 pages, collects The Darkness #106–111, April 2013, ISBN 1-60706-672-6)
  - Progeny (160 pages, collects Artifacts #25–26, Witchblade #164–165, and The Darkness #111, August 2013, ISBN 1-60706-748-X)
  - Rebirth: Volume 3 (160 pages, collects The Darkness #112–116, February 2014, ISBN 1-60706-806-0)
