= Witchblade =

American comic book series and its franchise

- Front cover to Witchblade Vol. 1 ("Witch Hunt") TPB (Feb 2008)

Publication information
- Publisher: Top Cow Productions (Image Comics)
- Schedule: Monthly
- Format: Ongoing series
- Genre: Superhero
- Publication date: November 1995 – October 2015; December 2017 – January 2020; July 2024 – Present
- No. of issues: 209
- Main character(s): Witchblade; Sara Pezzini; Alex Underwood

Creative team
- Created by: Marc Silvestri; David Wohl; Brian Haberlin; Christina Z Michael Turner
- Written by: David Wohl; Marc Silvestri; Brian Haberlin; Christina Z Ron Marz; Marguerite Bennett
- Artist(s): Michael Turner; Marc Silvestri; Stjepan Šejić; Giuseppe Cafaro

Witchblade is an American comic book series published by Top Cow Productions, an imprint of Image Comics, which ran from November 1995 to October 2015. The series was created by Top Cow founder and owner Marc Silvestri, editor David Wohl, writers Brian Haberlin and Christina Z, and artist Michael Turner.

The Witchblade comic was adapted into a television series in 2001, as well as an anime, a manga and a novel in 2006. A feature film based on the comic, titled The Witchblade, was announced for a 2009 release, but was never produced. A second Witchblade television series was announced for development in January 2017, but no further updates have been reported.

Top Cow relaunched Witchblade comic in December 2017 with the creative team of writer Caitlin Kittredge and artist Roberta Ingranata. The series features journalist Alex Underwood as the main character.

The first of a new Witchblade comic series was released in July 2024 featuring a new Witchblade creative team: writer Marguerite Bennett, artist Giuseppe Cafaro, colorist Arif Prianto and letterer Troy Peteri.

== Plot summary ==
The series follows Sara Pezzini, an NYPD homicide detective who comes into possession of the Witchblade, a supernatural, sentient gauntlet that bonds with a female host and provides her with a variety of powers in order to fight supernatural evil. Sara struggles to hone the powers of the Witchblade and fend off those with a nefarious interest in it, such as entrepreneur Kenneth Irons and his bodyguard Ian Nottingham.

== Characters ==
Witchblade #80

=== The Witchblade ===
The Witchblade is a sentient gauntlet; described as being the offspring of the Darkness and Angelus and serving as the balance between the two forces. Often described as being a male entity, though occasionally taking a feminine form whenever it manifests itself, the Witchblade symbiotically bonds itself to humans—typically women—to serve as its bearers.

=== Sara Pezzini ===
A New York City detective, Sara first encountered the Witchblade while on a case with her then partner, Michael Yee. After both officers were mortally wounded by criminal Ian Nottingham, the gauntlet suddenly left the possession of his employer, Kenneth Irons, and gave its power to Sara, healing her wounds. When Jackie Estacado, the host of the Darkness, was possessed by its influence, he impregnated a temporarily comatose Sara as part of an effort to sway the Witchblade's balance. However, neither of them became aware of this until later. Eventually, Sara met and relinquished the Witchblade to Danielle Baptiste, to whom the artifact had a strong affinity. Amidst complications during the birth of her daughter, Hope, Sara's life was saved when she received half of the Witchblade from Dani. Sara now possesses the full Witchblade and Dani is now the host for the Angelus.

=== Danielle Baptiste ===
Danielle is a young ballet dancer who was born in New Orleans. After moving to New York to pursue her career, she experienced a mysterious dream in which she saw herself inheriting great power by means of a mystical gauntlet. Dani found herself taking a walk and wandering to an antique shop the next day. It was there that she encountered Sara Pezzini, the current host of the Witchblade. Having become pregnant, Sara realized that the time had come for her to relinquish the artifact. Sara relinquished the Witchblade to Dani when she realized that she was meant to become its next host. While exploring her powers, Dani faced and overcame a number of mystical opponents. Eventually, Dani returned half of the Witchblade to Sara in order to save Sara's life following the birth of her child. She currently does not have any portion of the Witchblade as she is the present host to the Angelus.

=== Patrick Gleason ===
An NYPD detective, Sara's partner and boyfriend. Following Hope's birth, he serves as the baby's surrogate father and Sara's confidant in issues involving the Witchblade.

=== The Curator/The Survivor ===
The owner of an antiques shop, the Curator is a sage-like spectator, occasional informant, and the second primary antagonist of the series. One of Sara and Dani's most trusted confidants, he knows much about the various Artifacts. The Curator later dies, spontaneously exploding after saying "all hope is lost". It was later revealed that the Curator was actually the Survivor, the mysterious mastermind behind all of the recent events in Sara's life. He is the sole survivor of the previous universe in which he was the "Codex", a being meant to ensure its survival in the event of Armageddon. Having failed in his duty and witnessed the destruction of his family, the Survivor has been gradually gathering and manipulating the Artifacts and their bearers throughout history as part of his plan to resurrect his universe.

=== Tau'ma ===
The Curator's brother, Tau'ma has sided with the Darkness and can pull Darklings from out of his head to attack or spy on others. He also wields a powerful cane with a gem-encrusted hawk head.

=== Hope Pezzini ===
Sara's daughter with Jackie Estacado. She is neither of the Darkness nor the Angelus, but has unknown powers that are dormant. Hope is the subject of a search by several Artifact bearers following her capture by the Survivor. Hope is the "Codex" for the entire universe, meant to survive and ensure its survival. The Survivor planned to kill Hope and replace her as the Codex in order to guarantee the resurrection of his own universe.

=== Julie Pezzini ===
Sara's sister. She was romantically involved with Jake, but the two broke up when Jake discovered that she was running drugs. Jake later returned and shot Julie, but she survived, leading to her arrest and imprisonment. Julie was later released after serving her sentence and was reunited with Sara. While taking Hope to a fair, Julie was surprised by Aphrodite IV, who killed her after shooting her in the head.

=== Ian Nottingham ===
Formerly a Captain of the British Special Air Service, Ian subsequently joined MI5. He underwent behavioural modifications for the purpose of infiltrating the Yakuza. Afterwards, he forgot his past and became Kenneth Irons' bodyguard. Ian has phenomenal skill with both ancient and modern weapons. Ian kills Sara's partner, Michael Yee. For a time he underwent a great change, allowing him the capability to absorb great quantities of energy and to drain energy from entities, even going so far as to temporarily host both the Witchblade and the Darkness. He also temporarily wielded Excalibur, the Witchblade's twin, but it was revealed that Excalibur was merely a shard of the Witchblade, which quickly reabsorbed it. After he lost Excalibur and was defeated by Sara, Ian was taken to prison, only to be freed later by Aphrodite IV. He then retrieved the Blood Sword from Michael Finnegan, gravely wounding the wielder of the Glacier Stone in the process, and left him in the river to die.

=== Kenneth Irons ===
The first main antagonist of the series, Kenneth Irons is a wealthy entrepreneur who discovered the Witchblade in Greece. Irons' age is unknown. It was eventually revealed that he was a Templar Knight of the Third Crusade and that he once drank from the Holy Grail, granting him a healing factor and immortality, establishing his age as greater than 800 years. However, due to his exposure to the Witchblade during an attempt to host it, Irons does not age at a normal rate; he appears to be no older than 35. In a failed bid to gain control of the Witchblade, Irons lost his hand and sacrificed his wife. Later he was one of two characters left in the Deathpool. As a result, Chief Joe Siry killed Irons for all of the trouble that he had unleashed on Sara. Kenneth is the father of Geraud Irons.

=== Joe Siry ===
Sara's former captain when she served at the 18th Precinct. He was the partner of Sara's dead father, Detective Vincent Pezzini.

=== Jake McCarthy ===
An NYPD detective, Jake was Sara's best friend and former partner. He fell in love with Sara, but his feelings were unrequited. A demon came to Earth and entered Jake's body, possessing him while he was wounded defending a weakened Sara. While in a coma he was placed in a hospital. When he woke up later, the god-like demon took full control of his body. The demon was bent on destroying the world to remake it into a hellish kingdom with him as ruler. Sara eventually drove the demon's influence out of Jake's mind, but Jake, still possessed by the demon, committed suicide to ensure that the demon could never control his body again.

=== Lisa Buzanis ===
Daughter of Maria, a deceased friend of Sara's.

=== Alex Underwood ===
A journalist who bonds with the Witchblade.

=== The Darkness ===
Jackie Estacado is a former mob hitman and later becomes the host for the Darkness. The Darkness is one of the parents of the Witchblade and one of the primordial forces of the Witchblade universe. He is a supporting character in the Witchblade series and is the main character in his own spin-off series.

=== The Angelus ===
The Angelus is the light counterpart of the Darkness and one of the parents of the Witchblade. The Angelus possesses many female hosts and is the arch-enemy of the Darkness. The Angelus was the primary antagonist of the Darkness series and the third primary antagonist of the Witchblade series.

=== Magdalena ===
Magdalena is a supporting character in the spin-off series Darkness and later in Witchblade.

=== Katarina Godliffe ===
A former witchblade wielder from Medieval Times.

=== Michael Yee ===
Sara's former co-worker from the police.

=== Tora no Shi ===
A assassin from the Yakuza who has fought both the Witchblade and Darkness users.

=== Finch ===
A student of Danielle.

=== Sabine ===
A lietunant from The Angelius Warriors.

=== Gerald Irons ===
the Son of Kenneth Irons who also desires the Witchblade like his father.

== In other media ==
=== Television ===
==== TNT series ====
Following a pilot film in August 2000, TNT premiered a television series based on the comic book series which ran for two seasons from June 12, 2001 to August 26, 2002. The series was directed by Ralph Hemecker, written by Marc Silvestri and J.D. Zeik, and starred Yancy Butler as Sara Pezzini. Although critically acclaimed and popular with audiences, the series was canceled in September 2002, reportedly due to Butler’s issues with substance abuse. Warner Home Video released Witchblade: The Complete Series—a seven-disc collector's set including the original made-for-TV movie, all 23 episodes of the series, and special features—on DVD on July 29, 2008.

=== Music ===
Witchblade: The Music

Compilation album by Various Artists
- Released: 2004
- Genre: Rock music
- Length: 54:20
- Label: Edge Artists
- Producer: G Tom Mac

Witchblade the Music is a compilation album of music from/inspired by the Witchblade TV series and the comic book. The songs included on this album are performed by various artists. It was compiled and produced by G Tom Mac a.k.a. Gerard McMahon G Tom Mac, conceived by Christina Z, and released in 2004 on the Edge Artists record label. The album notes credit G Tom Mac for the music and Eddie Kislinger for the lyrics for "Wicked Town", "Drop Dead Pretty", and "Was It Magic”. G Tom Mac is also credited for "Greater Powers"; "Child of Mine" with Roger Daltrey; and "Cry Little Sister" which he wrote with Michael Maineri. In addition, G Tom Mac and Kislinger are credited as the executive producers of the soundtrack.

==== NBC series ====
In January 2017, NBC announced the development a Witchblade television series, with Carol Mendelsohn and Caroline Dries serving as executive producers.

=== Anime series ===
Top Cow and Japanese animation studio Gonzo produced an anime adaptation of Witchblade, which began broadcast during April 2006 and ran for 24 episodes. Although the anime features a new story with all new characters, it exists in the same continuity as the comic book and manga. The anime focuses on Masane Amaha, who has no recollection of her past beyond six years earlier.

=== Manga ===
In August 2004, Top Cow made an agreement with manga publisher Kodansha to produce a manga adaptation of Witchblade. The subsequent adaptation, Witchblade Takeru (ウィッチブレイド丈流, Wicchibureido Takeru), was released in March 2006, written by the anime's main writer Yasuko Kobayashi (小林靖子) and drawn by Kazuasa Sumita (隅田 かずあさ, Sumita Kazuasa). The manga features a different plot and characters from the Witchblade anime and comic book but is set in the same continuity as both. The manga focuses on Takeru Ibaraki, an average Japanese high school girl raised in a Buddhist convent who experiences recurring nightmares about the Witchblade and eventually becomes its newest bearer. The manga was released in the U.S. by Top Cow and Bandai Entertainment from February 2007 to February 2008.

=== Japanese novel ===
Witchblade: Ao no Shōjo (ウィッチブレイド 碧の少女, Witchibureido Ao no Shōjo) is a Japanese novel written by Satoshi Ichikawa (市川智士) with art and illustrations by Makoto Uno (うのまこと), who previously worked on the Witchblade anime as the lead art and character designer. It was published in August 2006. The protagonist is Yuri Miyazono, a sickly 15-year-old Okinawan girl who bonds with the Witchblade for her own survival. The novel is set the same continuity as the Witchblade anime and manga, with Yuri as the immediate successor of Takeru Ibaraki from Witchblade Takeru and the immediate predecessor of Masane Amaha from the Witchblade anime.

=== Cancelled film and untitled video game adaptation ===
A feature film adaptation of the comic was announced in 2008 and scheduled for a 2009 release, but was never produced. The film was to have been produced by Platinum Studios, Top Cow Productions, and Arclight Media, with Top Cow's Matt Hawkins & Marc Silvestri, Platinum's Rich Marincic, and Greenberg Group's Randy Greenberg serving as executive producers. Production was planned for September 2008, with filming to be done in Australia. A video game was announced but was later scrapped.
