= David Wohl =

American comic book writer and editor

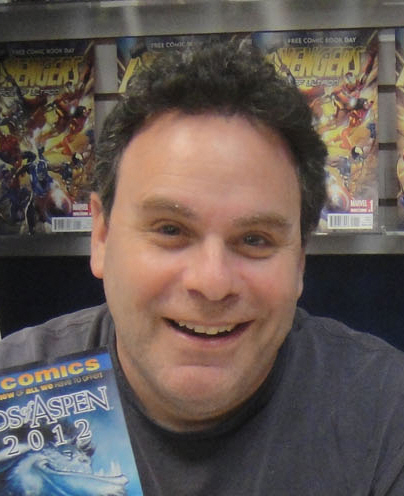
- David Wohl in 2012
- Areas: Writer, Editor
- Notable works: Witchblade; The Darkness; Battle of The Planets

David Wohl is an American comic book writer and editor. He is best known as an editor at Marvel Comics and Top Cow Productions and, at the latter, writing The Darkness and Witchblade.

== Career ==
David Wohl began his creative career as a high school intern at Marvel Comics. He later became an assistant editor on titles ranging from Spider-Man to X-Men, and later still was promoted to managing editor.

In 1993, Wohl left Marvel to become editor-in-chief and executive vice president of Top Cow Productions, eventually becoming president in 1999. While at Top Cow, he co-created and wrote such comic book franchises as The Darkness, Witchblade, and Aphrodite IX. He worked as a producer on the Witchblade television series that aired on TNT for two seasons. Several episodes of the series were based on Wohl's original story ideas.

In 2003, Wohl joined John Woo's Tiger Hill Entertainment as creative director, working with Clive Barker on Demonik for Majesco and with Woo on Stranglehold for Midway Games.

In 2006, Wohl became vice president of development for the fledgling animation company Blockade. As of the late 2000s, the company has four shows in production, led by a television series based on Sony's Heavenly Sword videogame franchise.

Wohl has also worked on comics for HBO's True Blood and New Regency's Se7en franchise.

After a two-year stint as editor-in-chief of Radical Comics, Wohl resumed his role at Blockade, and is currently creating and writing several new projects with Aspen Comics and served as producer on the film adaptation of Ratchet & Clank, released in April, 2016, as well as Sly Cooper (currently in development). Wohl has also recently taken a position as consultant at DC Entertainment, editing several comic lines.

Wohl's most recent series for Aspen are Executive Assistant: Iris (currently in Active Development with American Sniper production company Mad Chance) and Santeria: The Goddess Kiss (released in 2016).
