= 2007 in comics =

Notable events of 2007 in comics.

== Events ==
=== January ===
- January 10: Superman & Batman vs. Aliens & Predator released.
- January 16: Dutch cartoonist Willem wins the Inktspotprijs for Best Political Cartoon.
- January 24: The Boys is canceled with issue #6.
- Red Menace by Jerry Ordway and Adam Brody (Wildstorm)
- Batman/The Spirit by Jeph Loeb (DC Comics)
- Bullet points by J. Michael Straczynski and Tommy Lee Edwards (Marvel)
- The Order of the Stones by Pierre Christin and Jean-Claude Meziéres, 30th album of the Valerian series (Dargaud).

=== February ===
- February 2: Newsarama reports that The Boys has been picked up by Dynamite Entertainment.
- February 5: Gerben Valkema's comic strip Elsje (Lizzy in English) makes its debut.
- February 7: The Dark Tower: The Gunslinger Born by Peter David and Jae Lee (Marvel)
- February 28: Release of 2000 AD prog #1526. This is the 30th anniversary issue and will see the start of three new storylines: Flesh (by Pat Mills and Ramon Sola), Nikolai Dante (by Robbie Morrison & Simon Fraser) and Savage (by Pat Mills and Charlie Adlard)
- The final issue of Cracked is published.
- 100 dollars Pour Mourir (An Hundred Dollars To Die) by Francois Corteggiani and Michel Blanc Dumont, 16th album of the Bluberry's youth series (Dargaud).
- In Italy, the fantasy series Lys makes its debut, written by Katja Centomo (Edizioni Tridimensional). It is interrupted after 8 issues.

=== March ===
- March 6: Albert Uderzo is honoured as Knight in the Order of the Netherlands Lion.
- March 7: Marvel Comics "kills" Captain America (US)
- March 14: The British children's TV show Blue Peter, who organized a competition to let young viewers choose which new character they would like to become a recurring cast member in the comic strip The Bash Street Kids declare the character Wayne the winner.
- March 14: First issue of Buffy the Vampire Slayer Season Eight (Dark Horse Comics)
- March 21: Andy Diggle starts his run on Hellblazer with issue #230.
- March 21: Empowered by Adam Warren and Ryan Kinnaird (Dark Horse Comics)
- With issue #215, Batman: Legends of the Dark Knight is cancelled by DC.
- The webcomic Crying Macho Man is collected in a print edition.
- First issue of the Italian fantasy series Angel's Friends, by Bruno Enna and Giada Perissinotto (Play Press).

=== April ===
- April 5: Alice in Sunderland by Bryan Talbot (Dark Horse Comics).
- April 15: The tribute album Astérix et ses amis is released, to celebrate Albert Uderzo's 80th birthday (Editions Albert René).
- April 25: Amazons Attack! by Will Pfeifer and Pete Woods (DC Comics).
- In the DC universe, The Lightning Saga arc begins.
- World war III by Keith Champagne and John Ostrander (DC comics)
- The Trenchcoat Brigade by John Ney Rieber and John Ridgway (Vertigo)
- Dimmi Che Non Vuoi Morire (Tell Me That You Don't Want To Die) graphic novel by Massimo Carlotto and Igort (Mondadori), part of the series about the private eye “Alligator”.

=== May ===
- May 2: The weekly series 52 concludes.
- May 2: Supernatural origins by Peter Johnson and Matthew Dow Smith is released, a prequel to the Supernatural series (WildStorm).
- May 3: Belgian comic artist Benoît Sokal is knighted in the Order of Leopold II.
- May 12: Bristol Comic Expo, start of two-day event
- May 15: Spike: Asylum by Brian Lynch and Franco Urru (IDW publishing).
- May 23: British comic heroine Tank Girl returns after a twelve-year sojourn, with original writer Alan Martin on scripts and Australian penciler Ashley Wood on art. The four-part mini-series is called The Gifting and will be collected in time for Christmas.
- First issue of The Astounding wolf-man, by Robert Kirkman and Jason Howard (Image)
- Rides (Wrinkles) – graphic novel by Paco Roca about the old age and the Alzehimer's disease (Delcourt).
- On Tue Au Théâtre Ce Soir (This evening, murder at the theatre) by Andrè Paul Duchateau and Tibet, 73th album of the Ric Hochet series (Le Lombard).
- Les Trois Yeux des gardiens du Tao (The Tao Wardens' Three Eyes) by Jean Van Hamme and Philippe Francq, 15th album of the Largo Winch series (Dupuis)

=== June ===
- June 1 Silver Surfer :requiem by J. Michael Straczynski and Esad Ribic (Marvel).
- June 12: In The Amazing Spider-Man, the story arc One More Day begins: the marriage between Peter Parker and Mary-Jane Watson is deleted from the history of the Marvel universe and the Spider-Man's continuity is wholly upset. The radical retcon is harshly criticized by critics and readers.
- June 16: Dragonero (Black dragon) fantasy by Luca Enoch, Stefano Vietti and Giuseppe Matteoni, first album of the series Romanzi a fumetti Bonelli (Bonelli graphic novels). Later, a comic series (always published by Bonelli) and a novel one were born from the album.
- In the Green Lantern titles, the Sinestro corps war arc begins (DC Comics).
- Fallen son: The death of Captain America by Jeph Loeb and various artists (Marvel)
- X-Men: Endangered Species by Mike Carey and Scot Eaton (Marvel Comics).
- Impeesa by Paolo Fizzarotti and Ivo Milazzo – biography of Robert Baden-Powell, published for the 100th anniversary of the scouting (Rizzoli Libri).

=== July ===
- July 10–11: Doug Marlette, creator of Kudzu, dies in a car accident, which means the end of his series.
- July 17: in Topolino, to celebrate the 60th anniversary of the character Scrooge McDuck, the saga Tutti i milioni di Paperone (All Scrooge's millions) by Fausto Vitaliano, begins, exploring how Scrooge became a billionaire in the 1920s.
- July 25: The United States Postal Service releases Marvel Superhero Stamps featuring Spider-Man, Wolverine, and other Marvel superheroes.
- Green Arrow: Year One by Andy Diggle and Jock (DC Comics)
- In Nathan Never comics, the so-called “space-time saga”, written by Stefano Vietti, begins: a falling space wreck destroys the megalopolis depicted in the series.

=== August ===
- August 11: The two-day comic event Caption starts.
- August 14: Tokyopop begins publishes Undertown.
- August 26: The final episode of Kudzu is published. Half a month earlier the creator, Doug Marlette, died in a car accident.
- August 26: The final episode of Triple Take by Scott Nickel and Todd Clark is published.
- In the Marvel Universe, the crossover Annihilation: Conquest begins.
- In the Top Cow universe, the arc First born, written by Ron Marz, begins; Sara Pezzini and Jackie Estacado give birth to a little girl, Hope, who reunites the powers of Witchblade and The Darkness.
- In Kuwait, first issue of The 99, by Naif Al-Mutawa (Teshkeel Comics).
- First issue of Dylan Dog color fest; it's the first integrally color series published by Sergio Bonelli.

=== September ===
- September 8: London Film & Comic Con, start of two-day event.
- September 9: The final episode of Farley is published.
- September 15: Suske en Wiske receive a bust in Kalmthout, Belgium.
- September 19: The Umbrella Academy: Apocalypse Suite by Gerard Way and Gabriel Bà (Dark Horse).
- September 29: During the Stripdagen in Houten, the Netherlands, Aloys Oosterwijk receives the Stripschapprijs. Ronald Grossey wins the P. Hans Frankfurtherprijs for his book about Studio Vandersteen. Henk Groeneveld wins the Bulletje en Boonestaakschaal.
- 299+1 by Leo Ortolani, parody of Frank Miller's 300 (Panini Comics).

=== October ===
- October 2: Artemis Fowl: The Graphic Novel by Eoin Colfer, Andrew Donkin and Giovanni Rigano (Hyperion books)
- October 10: The Best American series releases the second The Best American Comics publication. The collection is edited by Chris Ware and Anne Elizabeth Moore.
- October 10: Burma Chronicles by Guy Delisle (Delcourt)
- October 10 : First issue of Volto Nascosto by Gianfranco Manfredi (Sergio Bonelli)
- October 20: The final episode of Posy Simmonds' Tamara Drewe is published.
- October 26: In Scott Adams' Dilbert, a gag is printed in which decision makers in offices are compared to "drunken lemurs". An employee at the Catfish Bend Casino in Burlington, Iowa hangs it in his office, after being informed that the casino will close down and is fired. Two months later, an administrative law judge rules in the fired employee's favor. Adams also draws a Dilbert gag supporting the fired employee.
- October 30: Zuda Comics, a webcomics imprint of DC Comics, launches.
- October 31: Gli occhi e il buio (The Eyes and the Darkness) – a period thriller by Gigi Simeoni, about the hunt for a serial killer in Milan at the beginning of the 20th century (Sergio Bonelli Editore)

=== November ===
- November 2: In Strasbourg the Tomi Ungerer Museum opens.
- November 9: The Folger Shakespeare Library hosts Lynda Barry, Alison Bechdel, and Chris Ware in a discussion on graphic novels as a part of the PEN/Faulkner Reading Series.
- November 21: The first episode of Signe Wilkinson's Family Tree is published. It will run until 2011.
- November 28: The graphic novel Cherubs! by Bryan Talbot is published by Desperado Publishing.

=== December ===
- December 11: Mike Le begins publishing the "Don't Forget To Validate Your Parking" webcomic.
- The final episode of Tumbleweeds is published.

=== Specific date unknown ===
- Gary Panter releases an updated version of his 1992 graphic novel Dal Tokyo.

== Deaths ==
=== January ===
- January 1: Tiberio Colantuoni, Italian comics artist (Bongo, worked for Rolf Kauka, Disney comics), dies at age 71.
- January 3: Sam Burlockoff, American comics artist and inker, dies at age 82.

=== February ===
- February 6: Robert Gigi (Scarlet Dream, Orion, Le Laveur de Planètes, Dossier Soucoupes Volantes, Agar, Ugaki), dies at age 80.
- February 8: Joe Edwards, American comics artist (Li'l Jinx), dies at age 85.
- February 14: Willy Moese, German comics artist and animator (Bogomil, Klaus und Choko), dies at age 79.
- February 18:
  - Alfio Consoli, Italian comics artist (Demoniak), dies at age 61.
  - Bob Oksner, American comics artist (Miss Cario Jones, made various TV-based comics, continued Dondi), dies at age 90.

=== March ===
- March 3: Osvaldo Cavandoli, Italian animator and comics artist (La Linea), dies at age 87.
- March 5: Yvan Delporte, Belgian journalist (chief editor of Spirou 1955-1968) and comics writer, dies at age 78.
- March 6: Lina Buffolente, Italian comics artist and illustrator (Piccolo Ranger, Gun Gallon Homicron, Nick Reporter, Reno Kid, Comandante Mark), dies at age 82.
- March 9: Hugo Leyers, aka Haschèl or Hug, Belgian comics artist (De Geschiedenis van Vlaanderen, De Geschiedenis van Nederland, Met De Neus & Co Op Stap), dies at age 77.
- March 12: Arnold Drake, American comics writer (It Rhymes with Lust, co-creator of the Doom Patrol and Deadman), dies at age 83.
- March 21: Drew Hayes, American comics artist and writer (Poison Elves), dies from a heart attack at age 37.
- March 24: Marshall Rogers, American comics artist (continued Batman, Silver Surfer, Wolverine and Doctor Strange), dies from a heart attack at age 57.
- March 27: Boris Dimovski, Bulgarian comics artist (Once Upon A Time), dies at age 81.
- March 29: Leslie Waller, American comics artist (It Rhymes with Lust), dies at age 82.
- March 31: Massimo Belardinelli, Italian comics artist (Ace Trucking Co.), dies at age 68.

=== April ===
- April 7: Johnny Hart, American comics artist (B.C., The Wizard of Id), dies at age 76.
- April 15: Brant Parker, American comics artist (The Wizard of Id, Crock), dies at age 86 from a stroke.
- April 21: Art Saaf, American comics artist (worked for Highlights for Children magazine and made various comics for DC Comics, Fiction House, Harvey Comics, Quality Comics and Standard Comics), dies at age 85.
- April 29: José De Huescar, aka Garvi, Spanish comics artist (Agence Eureka), dies at age 68.

=== May ===
- May 1: Tom Artis, American comics artist (DC Comics, Marvel Comics, Fleetway), dies at age 51.
- May 2: Mario Cubbino, Italian comic artist (Zip e Jungla, Wallenstein i Mostro, Karzan, L'Ombra, worked on Pantera Bionda, Dylan Dog and Diabolik, worked for Rinaldo Dami's studio, drew comics for Trisanto Torelli and Amalgamated Press), dies at age 77.
- May 6: Oscar Blotta, Argentine comics artist and animator (El Gnomo Pimenton, Ventajita), dies at age 88.
- May 8: Manuel Moro, Mexican comics artist (Aníbal 5), dies at age 77.
- May 9: Luk Carlens, Belgian comic artist (member of the collective Ercola), dies at age 65.
- May 26: Jack Edward Oliver, British comics writer and artist (E.C. Ryder, Fresco-Le-Raye the Dinosaur, Blunder Girl, Master Mind, Crazy Maisie, Cliff Hanger, Vid Kid), dies at age 64.

=== June ===
- June 5: Arnaud Leterrier, French comics artist (Finn Mac Cumhall, Les Chasseurs de Rêves), dies at age 39.
- June 7: Roger Armstrong, American comics artist (Disney comics, the Bugs Bunny newspaper comic strip, continued Napoleon and Uncle Elby and Little Lulu), dies at age 89.
- June 10: Taizo Yokoyama, Japanese cartoonist and comics artist (Pu-San, Shakai Gihyo), dies at age 90.
- June 11: Percy Sedumedi, South African painter, sculptor, poet and comic artist (Mzi Mzo, Travels of the Free Spirit), dies at age 56.
- June 18: Pratap Mullick, Indian comic artist (Nagraj), dies at age 70.
- June 20: John Bernard Handelsman, British comics artist, cartoonist and illustrator (Freaky Fables), dies at age 85.
- June 22: Jeff Wilkinson, Australian comics artist (The Phantom Ranger, The Shadow, Kid Champion), dies at age 82.
- June 24:
  - Giovanni Boselli, Italian comics artist (Susy Rosa, Gec Sparaspara, Joe Felix, Zia Rapunzía, Pachito Olé, Bellocchio e Leccamuffo, Il Signor Beniamino, Dodo & Cocco, Quelli del West, Topo Leonardo), dies at age 83.
  - Pil, Belgian cartoonist (Meneerke Peeters), dies at age 82.
- June 28: Howie Schneider, American comics artist (Eek & Meek, Percy's World, Bimbo's Circus, The Sunshine Club), dies at age 77 from complications from heart bypass surgery.

=== July ===
- July 10–11: Doug Marlette, American comics artist (Kudzu), dies at age 57 in a car accident.
- July 14: Harry Driggs, American underground cartoonist, dies at age 71.
- July 19: Roberto Fontanarrosa, aka El Negro, Argentine comics artist (Inodoro Pereyra, Boogie, el aceitoso), dies at age 62.

=== August ===
- August 12: Mike Wieringo, American comics artist (DC Comics, co-creator of Tellos), dies at age 44.
- August 26: Larry Woromay, American comic artist (worked for EC Comics and Charlton Comics, contributed to Eerie), dies at age 80.
- Specific date unknown: August: Phil Gascoine, British comic book artist (The Sarge), dies at age 72-73.

=== September ===
- September 6:
  - George Crenshaw, American comics artist and animator (Belvedere, The Muffins, Nubbin, Simpkins, McGirk's Works and Gumdrop), dies at age 89.
  - Ian Gray, British comics writer (wrote gag comics for The Beano), dies at age 69 from a heart attack.
- September 7: Ruben Sosa, Argentinian comic artist (worked on Misterix, Ernie Pike), dies at age 67.
- September 13: Phil Frank, American comics artist (Farley), dies at age 64 from a brain tumor.
- September 14: Horst Klöpfel, German comics artist and painter, dies at age 82 or 83.
- September 28: Jan van der Aa, aka Punt, Belgian painter, cartoonist and comics artist (De Perfesser), dies at age 80.

=== October ===
- October 2: Richard Goldwater, American editor-in-chief of Archie Comics, dies of cancer at age 71.
- October 3:
  - Manfred Sommer, Spanish comics artist (Frank Cappa), dies at age 74.
  - Elmer Wexler, American illustrator and comics artist (Vic Jordan, Jon Jason), dies at age 89.
- October 5: Josette Macherot, wife of Raymond Macherot and colorist of his comics, dies at age 77.
- October 15: Manny Curtis, British comic artist (Algie & Fred, Mixed Blessings), dies at age 72.
- October 20: Peg Bracken, American writer and comics writer (Phoebe, Get Your Man, with Homer Groening), dies at age 89.

=== November ===
- November 5: Paul Norris, American comics artist (co-creator of Aquaman, continued Brick Bradford), dies at age 93.
- November 6: Bob Bindig, American comics artist (Big Boy, Buster Bison, The Mischievous Twin Bears), dies at age 86.
- November 27: Donyo Donev, Bulgarian cartoonist, caricaturist, animator and comics artist (The Three Fools, Trimata Glupaci, Chetirmata Glupaci, Umno Selo), dies at age 81.

=== December ===
- December 3:
  - Eduard De Rop, Belgian comics artist (Studio Vandersteen, De Geschiedenis van Sleenovia, assisted and continued Pats, De Rode Ridder and Jerom), dies at age 79.
  - James Kemsley, Australian comics artist (Frogin, continued Ginger Meggs), dies at age 59.
- December 8: Al Scaduto, American comics artist (assisted on and continued They'll Do It Every Time, Little Iodine, dies at age 79.
- December 9: Wayne Howard, American comics artist (Charlton Comics), dies at age 58.
- December 14: Dave Gantz, American cartoonist, novelist and sculptor (Little Lizzie, Moxy, Dudley D., Don Q., assisted on Peanuts, worked for Timely Comics), dies at age 85.
- December 23: Raphaël Carlo Marcello, also known as Ralph Marc, Italian comics artist (Docteur Justice, continued Le Cavalier Inconnu), dies at age 78.
- December 25: Gualtiero Schiaffino, aka Skiaffino, Italian comics artist (I Santicielo, La Bancarella, I Diavoli), dies at age 54.
- December 27: Wim Meuldijk, Dutch TV writer and comics artist (Ketelbinkie, Sneeuwvlok de Eskimo), dies at age 85.

=== Specific date unknown ===
- Herbert Geldhof, aka Herbert, Belgian comics artist (Docteur Gladstone, worked on L'oncle Paul), dies at age 77 or 78.
- Hui Guan-man, Chinese comics artist (Uncle Choi), dies at age 70.

== Exhibitions and shows ==
- March 4 – June 11: Museum of Modern Art (New York City) — "Comic Abstraction: Image-Breaking, Image-Making," an exhibition of fine artists who use the language of comics as the jumping-off point for their work
- April 5 – July 1: The Cartoon Museum (London, England) — "Alice in Sunderland: The Exhibition," featuring work from Bryan Talbot's graphic novel, as well as its various influences
- April 21–August 19: Phoenix Art Museum (Phoenix, Arizona) — "UnInked: Paintings, Sculpture and Graphic Work by Five Cartoonists," featuring Kim Deitch, Jerry Moriarty, Gary Panter, Ron Regé Jr. and Seth; guest-curated by Chris Ware
- May–June: Jackson State University (Jackson, Mississippi) — "Other Heroes: African-American Comics, Creators, Characters, and Archetypes," curated by John Jennings and Damien Duffy
- September 4, 2007–January 19, 2008: Cartoon Research Library, Ohio State University (Columbus, Ohio) —"Rarities: Unusual Works from the Caniff Collection", celebrating the centennial of Milton Caniff's birth (part of the Festival of Cartoon Art)
- September 14, 2007 – January 24, 2008: Museum of Comic and Cartoon Art (New York City) — "Infinite Canvas: The Art of Webcomics", featuring the work of Dean Haspiel, Dan Goldman, Josh Neufeld, Jerry Holkins & Mike Krahulik, John Allison, Batton Lash and others
- October 23, 2007–March 23, 2008: Ohio Historical Society (1982 Velma Avenue, Columbus, Ohio) — "Spotlight on Milton Caniff" (part of the Festival of Cartoon Art)
- December 6–January 1, 2008: Floating World Comics (Portland, Oregon) — "Spacenight: A Tribute to Bill Mantlo", a fundraiser exhibition of Rom the Spaceknight illustrations, by such creators as Jeffrey Brown, Sal Buscema, Guy Davis, Renée French, Brandon Graham, Corey Lewis, Walt Simonson, Al Milgrom, Jeff Parker, Ron Regé Jr., and Danijel Žeželj

== Conventions ==
- January 19–20: Big Apple Comic Book Art, and Toy Show I (Penn Plaza Pavilion, New York City, US) — guests include Seth Tobocman, James Romberger, Alex Maleev, Alex Saviuk, Arnold Drake, Mac McGill, Bill Sienkiewicz, Dan Slott, Danny Fingeroth, Dennis Calero, Dick Ayers, Fred Harper, Guy Dorian, Guy Gilchrist, Ian Dorian, Irwin Hasen, Ivan Brandon, Ivan Velez, Jamal Igle, Jim Kyle, Jennifer Camper, Jim Salicrup, Jim Sherman, Ken Gale, Mark Texeira, Mercy Van Vlack, Michael Avon Oeming, Rich Buckler, Sean Chen, and Tommy Castillo
- January 27–28: Phoenix Comicon (Mesa, Arizona) — 3,200 attendees; official guests: Shannon Denton, Crispin Freeman, Tiffany Grant, Matt Greenfield, M. Alice LeGrow, Angel Medina, Vic Mignogna, George Pérez, Jen Quick, and Amy Reeder Hadley
- February 16–18: MegaCon (Orange County Convention Center, Orlando, Florida, US) — guests include David Finch, Darwyn Cooke, George Pérez, Andy Smith, Brian Pulido, Sean Astin, Lou Ferrigno, Virginia Hey, Bob May, David Hedison, and "Lois Lane" actresses Noel Neill and Margot Kidder (guests June Lockhart and Mark Goddard canceled)
- February 23–25: New York Comic Con (Jacob K. Javits Convention Center, New York City, US) — guest of honor: George Pérez; official guest: Peter David
- March 2–4: WonderCon (Moscone Center West, San Francisco, California, US)
- March 3: STAPLE! (Red Oak Ballroom, Austin, Texas, US) — guests: Dean Haspiel, Brian Keene, Danielle Corsetto, Jim Mahfood, Dave Crosland, and David Hopkins
- March 16–18: Wizard World Los Angeles (Long Beach Convention Center, Long Beach, California, US)
- March 17: UK Web & Mini Comix Thing (London, UK)
- March 24–25: Steel City Con (Pittsburgh Expomart, Monroeville, Pennsylvania) — guests include Matthew Atherton/Feedback
- March 31–April 1: Emerald City ComiCon (Qwest Field Event Center, Seattle, Washington, US) — 7,000 attendees; guests: Mark Bagley, David Mack, Terry Moore, Mike Oeming, Michael Golden, Gene Ha, Phil Hester, Ron Marz, Jim Lawson, Ande Parks, Joseph Michael Linsner, Chris Sprouse, Mark Waid, Peter Gross, Frank Cho, Brian Pulido, Brian Wood, Dexter Vines, Georges Jeanty, Eric Shanower, Adam Hughes, Brian Michael Bendis, Jim Woodring, Scott Kurtz, Jim Valentino, Peter Bagge, Darick Robertson, Steve Lieber, David Hahn, Matthew Clark, Jeff Parker, Ed Brubaker, Brian Reed, Kurt Busiek, Paul Chadwick, Tim Sale, Clayton Crain, Mike Grell, Andy Kuhn, Aaron Lopresti, Alex Maleev, Gail Simone, and Greg Rucka
- April 7: FLUKE Mini-Comics & Zine Festival (Tasty World, Athens, Georgia)
- April 12–15: Coco Bulles (Culture Palace of Abidjan, Côte d'Ivoire)
- April 13–15: Toronto ComiCON Fan Appreciation Event (Metro Toronto Convention Centre, Toronto, Ontario, Canada)
- April 21–22: Alternative Press Expo (Concourse Exhibition Center, San Francisco, California, US)
- April 21–22: Small Press and Alternative Comics Expo (S.P.A.C.E.) (Aladdin Shrine Center, Columbus, Ohio) — event expands to two days; special guest: Dave Sim
- April 27–29: Pittsburgh Comicon (Radisson Hotel Pittsburgh ExpoMart, Monroeville, Pennsylvania) — guests include George Pérez, Ron Frenz, Terry Moore, Amanda Conner, Mike Grell, Adam Hughes, Joe Jusko, Joseph Michael Linsner, and David W. Mack
- May 12–13: Comic Expo (British Empire & Commonwealth Exhibition Hall/Ramada Plaza Hotel, Bristol, UK) — guests include Kurt Busiek, Brian K Vaughan, Jeph Loeb, and Jean-Pierre Dionnet. Presentation of the Eagle Awards, hosted by Norman Lovett.
- May 17–18: East Coast Black Age of Comics Convention (African American Museum in Philadelphia and Anderson Hall (Temple University), Philadelphia, Pennsylvania) — guests include Dwayne McDuffie, Kyle Baker, and Taimak; presentation of the Glyph Comics Awards
- May 18–20: Motor City Comic Con (Rock Findancial Showplace, Novi, Michigan) — guests include BarBara Luna, Louis Gossett Jr., and Lou Ferrigno
- June 1–3: Adventure Con (Knoxville Convention Center, Knoxville, Tennessee, US) — first event held under the new ownership by Las Vegas Autographs, LLC. Guest of honor: Ethan Van Sciver; other guests include John Romita Jr.
- June 8–-10: Toronto Comic Con ("Paradise Comics Toronto Comicon") (Direct Energy Centre, Hall C, Toronto, Ontario, Canada) — guests of honor: Michael Golden, Terry Moore, Marv Wolfman, and Matt Wagner
- June 15–17: Heroes Convention (Charlotte Convention Center, Charlotte, North Carolina, US) — guests include Jim Amash, Robert Atkins, Kyle Baker, John Beatty, Christian Beranek, Mark Brooks, Nick Cardy, Richard Case, Johanna Draper Carlson, KC Carlson, C. B. Cebulski, Bernard Chang, Sean Chen, Cliff Chiang, Paul Conrad, Peter David, Rosario Dawson, Kelly Sue DeConnick, Tania del Rio, Todd Dezago, Dan Didio, Tony DiGerolamo, Colleen Doran, Dave Dorman, Tommy Lee Edwards, Michael Eury, Tom Feister, Ian Flynn, Matt Fraction, Francesco Francavilla, Robin Furth, Craig Gilmore, Dick Giordano, Michael Golden, Keron Grant, Cully Hamner, Scott Hampton, Tony Harris, Irwin Hasen, Jeremy Haun, Paul Hornschemeier, Adam Hughes, Jamal Igle, Mark Irwin, Georges Jeanty, Nat Jones, Rafael Kayanan, Barry Kitson, Erik Larsen, John Paul Leon, John Lucas, Heidi MacDonald, Jim Mahfood, Laura Martin, Nathan Massengill, Paul Maybury, Ed McGuinness, Bob McLeod, Joshua Middleton, Tony Moore, Steve Niles, Phil Noto, Jeff Parker, Jason Pearson, Brandon Peterson, Chris Pitzer, Eric Powell, Rick Remender, Andrew Robinson, Don Rosa, Craig Rousseau, Andy Runton, Chris Samnee, Alex Saviuk, Bill Sienkiewicz, Joe Simon, Chris Staros, Joe Staton, Karl Story, Ryan Stegman, Brian Stelfreeze, Arthur Suydam, Mark Texeira, Roy Thomas, Tim Townsend, Dean Trippe, Koi Turnbull, Chris Walker, Loston Wallace, Daniel Way, Mike Wieringo, Renée Witterstaetter, Ethan Van Sciver, Dexter Vines, Tracy Yardley, and Skottie Young
- June 15–17: Wizard World Philadelphia (Philadelphia Convention Center, Philadelphia, Pennsylvania, US)
- June 23–24: Big Apple Comic Book Art, and Toy Show "Summer Sizzler" (Penn Plaza Pavilion, New York City, US) — guests include Alan Kupperberg, Alex Niño, Alex Maleev, Cameron Stewart, Dan Fogel, Danny Fingeroth, Ernie Chan, Graig Weich, Guy Dorian, Ian Dorian, J. David Spurlock, Jay Lynch, Ken Kelly, Michael Golden, Michael Avon Oeming, Mitchell Breitweiser, Murphy Anderson, Neil Vokes, Paul Gulacy, Rags Morales, Rich Buckler, Rudy Nebres, Skip Williamson, Tommy Castillo, and Walt Simonson
- June 23–24: MoCCA Festival (Puck Building, New York City, US)
- June 30–July 1: Dallas Comic Con ("DCC9") (Richardson Civic Center, Richardson, Texas) — guest of honor: Herb Trimpe; official guests: Billy Tan, Bill Willingham, Matthew Sturges, Kristian Donaldson, Brian Denham, Josh Howard, The Crow creator James O'Barr, Ben Dunn, Jamie Mendoza, Steve Irwin, Kez Wilson, Kenneth Smith, Cal Slayton, Baldo writer Hector Cantú, multiple Hugo-winning fan artist Brad W. Foster, and more
- July 26–29: Comic-Con International (San Diego Convention Center, San Diego, California, US) — 125,000 attendees; official guests: Sergio Aragonés, Alison Bechdel, Allen Bellman, Ray Bradbury, Dan Brereton, Daryl Cagle, Cecil Castellucci, Darwyn Cooke, Guy Delisle, Paul Dini, Roman Dirge, Cory Doctorow, Ann Eisner, Warren Ellis, Mark Evanier, Renee French, Gary Friedrich, Christos N. Gage, Neil Gaiman, Rick Geary, George Gladir, Laurell K. Hamilton, Gilbert Hernandez, Jaime Hernandez, Adam Hughes, Joe Jusko, Miriam Katin, Mel Keefer, Scott Kurtz, Joseph Michael Linsner, Joe Matt, David Morrell, Karen Palinko, Lily Renee Phillips, Mike Ploog, Paul Pope, George A. Romero, Rowena, Dave Stevens, J. Michael Straczynski, Ben Templesmith, Roy Thomas, Morrie Turner, Mark Verheiden, Matt Wagner, J. H. Williams III, Kent Williams, F. Paul Wilson, Brian Wood, and more.
- August 9–12: Wizard World Chicago (Donald E. Stephens Convention Center, Rosemont, Illinois, US)
- August 11–12: CAPTION: "Dreams and Nightmares" (East Oxford Community Centre, Oxford, England, UK)
- August 18–19: Toronto Comic Arts Festival (Old Victoria College, Toronto, Ontario, Canada)
- August 24–26: Fan Expo Canada (Metro Toronto Convention Centre, Toronto, Ontario, Canada) — 43,738 attendees; guests include Adam West, Jonathan Frakes, Tricia Helfer, David Prowse, Malcolm McDowell, Robert Beltran, Dario Argento, Adrienne Barbeau, John Romita Jr. and John Romita Sr., Greg Pak, Olivier Coipel, Simone Bianchi, Paul Dini, Steve McNiven, David Finch (comics), Michael Turner, Frank Quitely, and Dale Eaglesham
- August 31–September 3: Dragon Con (Hyatt Regency Atlanta/Marriott Marquis/Atlanta Hilton, Atlanta, Georgia, US) — 30,000+ attendees; guests include Lewis Gossett Jr., Tara McPherson, Erik Estrada, and the MythBusters build team
- September 1–2: London Film & Comic Con (London, UK)
- September 11–15: Jornadas de Cómic (Aviles, Spain)
- September 14–16: Comics Salon (Bratislava, Slovakia)
- September 15–16: Montreal Comiccon (Place Bonaventure, Montreal, Quebec, Canada) — 700 attendees
- September 29–30: Stumptown Comics Fest (Lloyd Center Doubletree, Portland, Oregon)
- October 12–13: Komikazen (Ravenna, Italy) — guest of honor is Ho Che Anderson
- October 12–13: Small Press Expo (Marriott Bethesda North Hotel & Conference Center, Bethesda, Maryland, US)
- October 18–20: International Comic Arts Forum (Library of Congress, Washington, D.C.) — guests include Ian Gordon, Lat, and Kyle Baker
- October 19–November 6: Comica — London International Comics Festival (Institute of Contemporary Arts, London, UK) — organized by Paul Gravett; guests include Sarnath Banerjee, Igort, Gipi, Clément Oubrerie, Jeffrey Lewis, Everett True, Jamie Delano, David Hine, Posy Simmonds, Lisa Appignanesi, Nick Abadzis, Marguerite Abouet, Misako Rocks!, Sean Michael Wilson, Lee O'Connor, Anthony Lappé, Dan Goldman. Introduction of the Comica Graphic Short Story Prize and Comica Comiket: Small Press Fair.
- October 25–27: Festival of Cartoon Art (Ohio State University, Columbus, Ohio) — "Graphic Storytelling"; speakers include Jessica Abel, Nick Anderson, Alison Bechdel, Ray Billingsley, Gary Groth, R. C. Harvey, Mike Peters, Paul Pope, Peter Poplaski, Ted Rall, Arnold Roth, P. Craig Russell, David Saylor, Diana Schutz, Frank Stack, Brian Walker, and Mort Walker
- October 27–28: Manitoba Comic Con (Victoria Inn, Winnipeg, Manitoba, Canada) — guests include David Prowse, Richard Hatch, Margot Kidder
- November 4: Comica Comiket Small Press Fair (Institute of Contemporary Arts, London, England) — first iteration; part of Comica, London International Comics Festival
- November 16–18: Big Apple Comic Book Art, and Toy Show III (Penn Plaza Pavilion, New York City, US) — guests include Adam Hughes, Alan Kupperberg, Alan Weiss, Alex Maleev, Alex Saviuk, Amanda Conner, Bernard Chang, William Tucci, Bob Hall, Bob Layton, Bob McLeod, Carmine Infantino, Chris Moreno, Darwyn Cooke, Dan Slott, Danny Fingeroth, Dennis Calero, Dick Ayers, Elayne Riggs, Frank Cho, Gary Friedrich, Graig Weich, Guy Dorian, Herb Trimpe, Ian Dorian, Irwin Hasen, Ivan Brandon, Joe Sinnott, Jim Steranko, John Romita Sr, Jim Calafiore, Jimmy Palmiotti, Jim Salicrup, Ken Gale, Ken Kelly, Kim Deitch, Kyle Baker, Mark Bodé, Mark Evanier, Mark Texeira, Mercy Van Vlack, Michael Gaydos, Michael Golden, Michael Netzer, Neal Adams, Norm Breyfogle, Paolo Rivera, William Foster III, Rich Buckler, Robin Riggs, Ron Garney, S. Clay Wilson, Sean Chen, Sergio Aragonés, Spain Rodriguez, Tim Sale, Tim Vigil, and Tom Feister
- November 16–18: Wizard World Texas (Arlington Convention Center, Dallas, Texas, US) — guests include Dan Didio, Marc Silvestri, Adam Kubert, Bill Sienkiewicz, Arthur Sudyam, and Laura Vandervoort
- November 18–19: Dublin City Comic Con (Tara Towers Hotel, Dublin, Ireland) — 2nd annual show; guests include: Jim Lee (Guest of Honour), Mark Millar, Steve McNiven, Doug Braithwaite, Ben Oliver, Jock, Carlos Pacheco, Adi Granov, Andy Diggle, Liam Sharp, C. B. Cebulski, Paul Cornell, Nick Roche, Stephen Mooney, Steve Thompson, John McCrea, Simon Bisley
- November 24–25: Mid-Ohio Con (Columbus Convention Center, Columbus, Ohio, US)

== First issues by title ==
Alice in Sunderland (graphic novel)
Release: April 5. Writer: Bryan Talbot. Artist: Bryan Talbot.

Arkin Comics
Release: by Arkin Ventures Pvt. Ltd. Editor: Shamik Dasgupta.

Banimon
Release: by Rocket North Press. Writer and Artist: Boris Savic.

BeanoMAX
Release: First issue was dated the first of March 2007, this comic was a monthly spinoff of the British comic The Beano.

Kartun Benny & Mice: Jakarta Luar Dalem
Release 2005. Writer: Benny Rachmadi Artist: Muhammad "Mice" Misrad

Forge of War (6-issue mini-series)
Release: May by Boom! Studios. Writers: Dan Abnett and Ian Edginton. Artist: Rahsan Ekedal.

Freddy vs. Jason vs. Ash (6-issue mini-series)
Release: November by Wildstorm, Dynamite Entertainment. Writer: James Kuhoric Artist: Jason Craig

Kamisama Dolls
Release: January by Shogakukan (Monthly Sunday Gene-X). Author: Hajime Yamamura

Last Blood
Release: May by Blatant Comics. Writer: Bobby Crosby Artist: Owen Gieni

March Comes in Like a Lion
Release: by Hakusensha (Young Animal). Author: Chica Umino

Northlanders
Release: December 5 by Vertigo. Writers: Brian Wood. Art by: Davide Gianfelice

Omega the Unknown
Release: Early 2006 by Marvel Comics. Writer: Jonathan Lethem. Art by: Farel Dalrymple and colorist Paul Hornschemeier.

Superman & Batman vs. Aliens & Predator (2-issue mini-series)
Release: January 10 by DC Comics. Writer: Mark Schultz .Art by: Ariel Olivetti.

Ward of the State
Release: May by Shadowline. Writer: Christopher Long Artist: Chee

=== Renamed titles ===
Dandy Xtreme
Release: The Dandy became the Dandy Xtreme in issue 3426 dated the 2 August 2007.
