= Pyongyang (disambiguation) =

Pyongyang is the capital of North Korea.

Pyongyang may also refer to:

- Pyongyang (comic), a graphic novel by Guy Delisle
- Pyongyang (restaurant chain)
- "Pyongyang", a song on the Blur album The Magic Whip

Pyongyang should not be confused with:

- Pyeongchang County, a county in Gangwon province, South Korea
- Pyonggang, a county in Kangwon province, North Korea
