= List of Shadowline publications =

Shadowline is an American comic book company and an imprint of Image Comics.

This is a list of Shadowline publications.

== Titles ==
=== A ===
- Accelerate (2007)
- After the Cape (2007)
- Aletheia (2008)
- Archibald Saves Christmas (2007)
- Archibald Saves Easter (2008)
- Archibald Chases the Dragon (2009)

=== B ===
- Badger vol. 2 (1997)
- Blacklight (2005)
- Bomb Queen: Royal Flush (2006)
- Bomb Queen II: Queen of Hearts (2006)
- Bomb Queen III: The Good, the Bad and the Lovely (2007)
- Bomb Queen IV: Suicide Bomber (2007)
- Bomb Queen V: The Divine Comedy (2008)
- Bomb Queen vs. Blacklight: Cat Fight (2005)
- Bomb Queen Presents: All Girl Comics (2009)
- Bruce: The Little Blue Spruce (2008)

=== C ===
- Cemetery Blues (2008)
- Cowboy Ninja Viking (2009)

=== D ===
- Dead Romans (2023)
- Dear Dracula (2008)
- DNAgents (2008)
- Drawing From Life (2007)

=== E ===
- Eddy Current (2008; hardcover)
- Emissary (2006)
- Evil and Malice (2009; Silverline)

=== G ===
- Graveslinger (2007)
- Gutwrencher (2008)

=== H ===
- Heathentown (2009)
- Hiding in Time (2007)

=== I ===
- I Hate Gallant Girl (2008)
- In Her Darkest Hour (2007)
- Intimidators (comics) (2005)

=== J ===
- Johnny Monster (2009)

=== K ===
- Kamikazi Blacktop

=== L ===
- Lazarus (2007)

=== M ===
- Metropol (hardcover)
- Missing the Boat (2008)
- Morning Glories (2010)
- M-Theory (2008)

=== N ===
- New World Order (2008)
- Normalman 20th Anniversary Special (2004)
- The Complete Normalman (2007)

=== O ===
- Overlook (2009)

=== P ===
- The Pact (2005)
- Parade (with Fireworks) (2007)
- Peter Panzerfaust (2012)
- Platinum Grit (2009)
- Pretty, Baby, Machine (2008)
- PX! A Girl and Her Panda (2007)
  - PX! vol. 2 (2008)

=== R ===
- Rat Queens
- Reckers
- The Return of ShadowHawk (2004)
- The Roberts (2008)
- Runes of Ragnan (2005)

=== S ===
- Savage (2008)
- Sam Noir: Ronin Holiday (2007)
- Sam Noir: Samurai Detective (2006)
- Second Chance at Sarah
- ShadowHawk (1992)
  - ShadowHawk II (1993)
  - ShadowHawk III (1993; reverts to ShadowHawk)
  - ShadowHawk (2004; ashcan)
  - ShadowHawk vol. 2 (2005)
  - ShadowHawk vol. 3 (2010)
- Small Gods (2005)
- The Surreal Adventures of Edgar Allan Poo: Book 1 (2007)
  - The Surreal Adventures of Edgar Allan Poo: Book 2 (2008; Silverline)

=== T ===
- T. Runt! (2009; Silverline)
- Task Force One (2006)
- Tasty Bullet (2009; OGN)
- The Lava Is a Floor (2009; Silverline)
- Tiffany's Epiphany (2009; Silverline)
- Timothy and the Transgalactic Towel (Silverline)
- Transit (2008; hardcover)

=== U ===
- Urban Monsters (2008)

=== V ===
- Vignettes: The Director's Cut (2008)
- Vix! (2008)

=== W ===
- Ward of the State (2007)

=== Z ===
- Zombie Cop (2009)
