= Ryan Winn =

American comic book artist

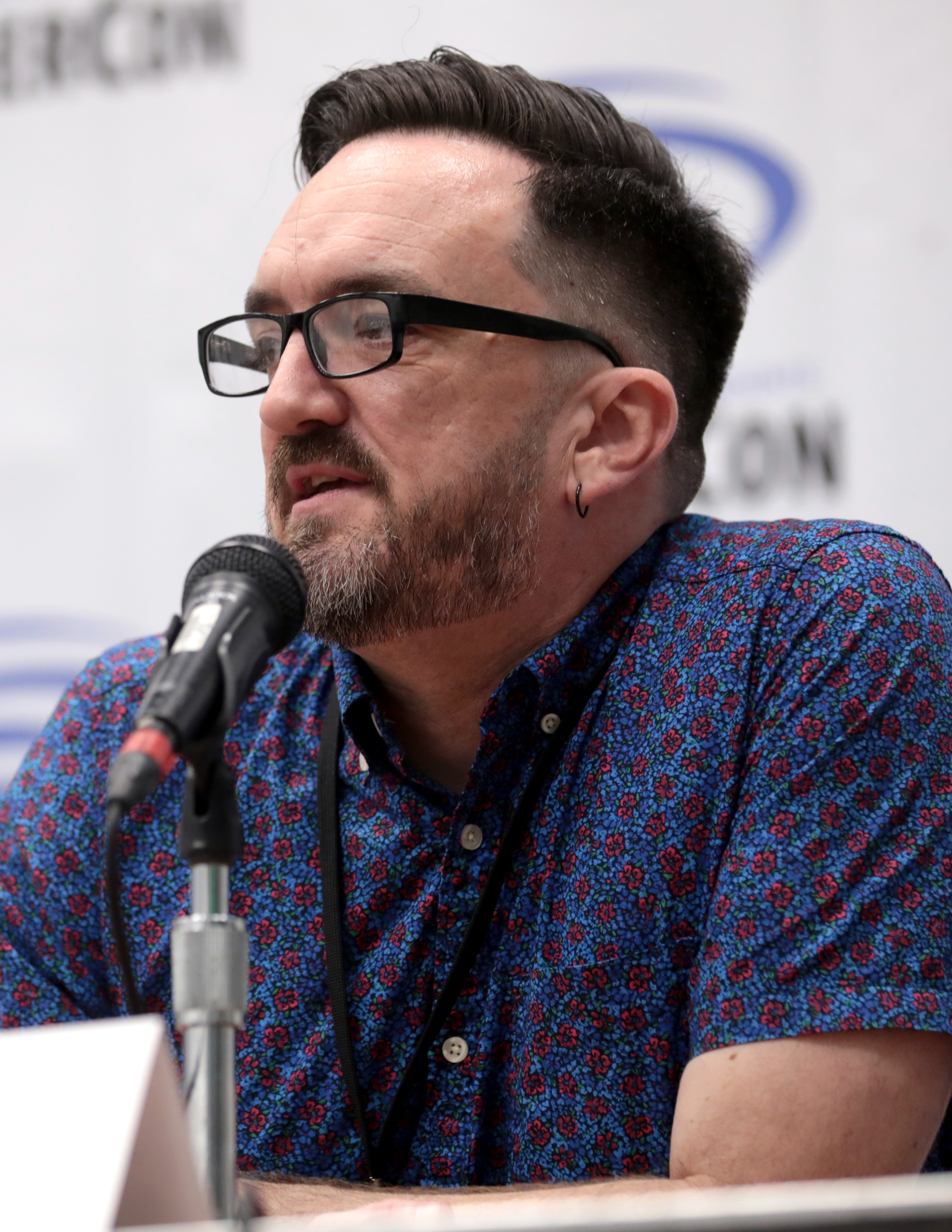
- Winn at the 2023 WonderCon
- Born: August 11, 1976 (age 50) San Mateo, CA
- Area: Artist/Inker
- Notable works: Spawn, The Darkness, Hiding in Time, WildCats, Batman (comic book), Brightest Day, Detective Comics, Batwing

Ryan Winn is an American comic book artist and inker residing in Orange County, CA. He frequently contributes artwork for DC Comics.

== Career ==
After apprenticing for several years as a "ghost inker", he first began receiving credit for his ink work in the early 2000s. He has worked for several major publishers and is currently working for DC Comics. For many years, he contributed art work to Top Cow and his work on The Darkness earned him a Harvey Award nomination for Best Inker, announced June 30, 2009.

In 2009, he was recruited to work on WildCats for Wildstorm Comics, inking over Tim Seeley. He then moved to projects from DC 'Central' such as Brightest Day, Untold Tales of the Blackest Night, Detective Comics, Teen Titans, Catwoman, and Batman working with artists such as Tony Daniel, David Finch, ChrisCross, and Marcus To.

Beginning in early 2011, he worked on Batman with artist Tony Daniel and then transitioned to Detective Comics for the re-launch of The New 52, the first issue of which has received six printings, second only to the relaunched Justice League which garnered seven printings. The relaunched Detective Comics received the award for "Best Series" at the 2012 Stan Lee Awards.

In 2012, he began work on The New 52 series Batwing with writer Judd Winick and artists ChrisCross and Marcus To.

Ryan appeared on the Nerdist Comic-Con wrap-up special, along with guests Damon Lindelof, Alex Albrecht, and John Barrowman filmed for television and aired on BBC America July 28, 2012.

== Selected works ==
- Ultimate Fantastic Four (Marvel, 2004)
- Spawn (Image, 2005–2007)
- Hunter-Killer (Top Cow, 2005)
- Wraithborn (Top Cow, 2006)
- Runes of Ragnan (ShadowLine, 2005/Image Comics, 2008)
- Hiding in Time (ShadowLine, 2007)
- The Darkness (Top Cow, 2008–2009)
- WildCats (Wildstorm Comics, 2009–2010)
- Bruce Wayne: The Road Home, Catwoman (DC Comics, 2010)
- Brightest Day (DC Comics, 2010)
- Untold Tales of the Blackest Night (DC Comics, 2010)
- Batman (DC Comics, 2011)
- Teen Titans (DC Comics, 2011)
- Detective Comics (DC Comics, 2011)
- Batwing (DC Comics, 2012)

== Creator-owned Projects ==
In 2007, Winn collaborated with writer Christopher E. Long on an independent series titled "Hiding in Time." The three issue series was edited by Jim Valentino and was published and distributed through ShadowLine Comics. Winn provided both pencil and ink artwork. The three-part series had a limited release but was well received and optioned by Warner Brothers for a major motion picture.

In 2018 he partnered with friend and writer Adam Jackman to publish the action packed series called Death Betty: We catch up to Betty during a rescue in progress. Fires, firefighter, dogs, and tots find their way into the fray as Betty takes a moment to reflect on where it all started. Also-novella excerpt featuring Betty's brother Bronson.

== Awards ==
In 2016, Winn was nominated for the Inkwell Awards S.P.A.M.I. (Favorite Small Press and Mainstream-Independent) award.
