= Papyrus (comics) =

Belgian comic book series

- The seventeenth book in the series, Tutankhamun, from left to right: Papyrus, Théti-Chéri and Pouin

Publication information
- Publisher: Dupuis (French); Cinebook (English)
- Format: Ongoing series
- Genre: Alternate history fiction
- No. of issues: 36 (in French); 7 (in English)

Creative team
- Created by: Lucien De Gieter

Papyrus is a Belgian comic book series, written and illustrated by Lucien De Gieter. The story takes place in ancient Egypt. It was first published in 1974 in Spirou magazine in the form of episodes.

An animated series was created in 1998 that was two seasons long (52 episodes) and shown on TFOU in France and in Quebec on Radio-Canada. It also aired on Unis in 2016.

In 2000, a video game for the Game Boy Color was developed by Planet Interactive Development and published by Ubisoft.

== Plot ==
Papyrus, a young fisherman in ancient Egypt, is chosen by a goddess to become the protector of the Pharao's daughter, princess Théti. Along with her and a group of friends, and sometimes under the order of the gods themselves, Papyrus ends up fighting threats against pharao's rule and the welfare of the people of Egypt.

== Characters ==
=== Main characters ===
- Papyrus: originally a young fisherman, Papyrus is the hero of the comic, friend of the daughter of the Pharaoh, and possessor of a magic sword which was given to him by the daughter of the god Sobek; in exchange, he must protect the princess Théti-Chéri from all danger.
- Théti-Chéri is the Pharaoh's daughter, grand priestess of Isis, sacred dancer, and heiress to the throne of the Double Kingdom. While she can be haughty and stubborn, she cares very much for Papyrus.

=== Regular side characters ===
- The Goddess with the Resplendent Hair (La Déesse au Cheveux Resplendissant) is Papyrus' patron deity, a lesser goddess and daughter of Sobek.
- Pharao: Théti's father and ruler of Egypt. While a capable and just ruler, he can be stern and unforgiving, especially where the welfare of his daughter is concerned.
- Imhotep is a one-legged boy and apprentice to the architect Amenope who becomes a friend of Papyrus.
- Pouin is a short, timid Bedouine dwarf.
- Khamelot is Pouin's donkey, who is much smarter and more determined than his master.
- Shepti is a young maidservant to Théti-Chéri who becomes a pawn of Sekhmet's mad High Priest in issue #22 (La Prisonnière de Sekhmet). Upon her rescue by Papyrus and Pouin, she and Pouin fall in love and get married.

== Albums ==
Thirty-three albums have been published so far:

1. La Momie engloutie (1978) (ISBN 2-8001-2721-X, ISBN 2-8001-0598-4 et ISBN 2-8001-2714-7): Papyrus is appointed by Sobek's daughter to rescue Théti-Chéri and her father from a power-hungry traitor at the Pharaoh's side.
2. Le Maître des trois portes (1979): While trying to discover why the Nile's waters have suddenly gone low, Papyrus and Théti-Chéri discover and become prisoners in a golden underground city ruled by the living mummy of Menes, who wishes to seize power over Egypt again. In order to escape, Papyrus must discover the secret of the three gates which separate the city from the upper world.
3. Le Colosse sans visage (1980): Papyrus aids the inhabitants of a city cursed by the gods for the unholy atrocities their past ruler (the titular colossus) has committed. For this well-meant deed, he is cursed by the gods and transformed into a hideous creature, and it is up to Théti-Chéri to appease the gods, even if it means paying the ultimate price.
4. Le Tombeau de Pharaon
5. L'Égyptien blanc
6. Les Quatre Doigts du Dieu Lune
7. La Vengeance des Ramsès (ISBN 2-8001-2727-9); English translation: The Rameses Revenge (ISBN 978-1905460359): The four colossi of the Temple of Rameses rise against a band of plunderers.
8. La Métamorphose d'Imhotep (ISBN 2-8001-2728-7); English translation: Imhotep's Transformation (ISBN 978-1905460502): Papyrus must find an antidote for the poisoned Pharaoh while a friend plays the role of the ruler.
9. Les Larmes du géant (ISBN 2-8001-2729-5): A Hittite princess arrives at court as a second wife for the Pharaoh, bringing with her the secret of iron. In the temple of Amonhotep III, plotters want to seize power for themselves and build invincible weapons, so they capture the Hittite princess as well as Théti.
10. La Pyramide noire (ISBN 2-8001-2730-9): Papyrus takes an enchanted Théti to a mage who may be able to heal her.
11. Le Pharaon maudit (ISBN 2-8001-2731-7): Théti and Papyrus fight against plunderers, six girls who call themselves Daughters of Akhenaton.
12. L'Obélisque: Amenope, the royal architect, and his assistant Imhotep, despite obstacles but with the help of Papyrus and Théti cut, transport, and erect an obelisk at Thebes.
13. Le Labyrinthe: Papyrus is named ambassador of Egypt by the King of Minos.
14. L'Île Cyclope (ISBN 2-8001-2734-1): Théti goes to rejoin Papyrus in Crete with the mummy of the son of Minos. Papyrus sets off again, finally finding and rescuing the princess on a fantastic island.
15. L'Enfant hiéroglyphe: Imhotep, the successor of Amenope, is saved from a fire by Papyrus. The parchment that established the plans of Amenope for the new temple were saved, but the workers strike, and Imhotep is accused of sacrilege. Théti and Papyrus discover those responsible for the strike.
16. Le Seigneur des crocodiles (ISBN 2-8001-2736-8): Captured by Libyan nomads, Papyrus and Théti escape into the desert where they meet a blind mage who asks Papyrus to give him his eyes.
17. Toutânkhamon, le Pharaon assassiné (ISBN 2-8001-2737-6); English translation Tutankhamun (ISBN 978-1-905460-84-7): While beset and framed by graverobbers plundering the Valley of the Kings, Papyrus meets the spirit of Ankhesenpaaton, the wife of Tutankhamen, who seeks his help in reuniting her with her beloved husband, just as Papyrus' ancestor has done so many years ago.
18. L'Œil de Rê (ISBN 2-8001-2194-7): During the feast of Opet, Amenmes, one of the sons of Rameses II disputes the throne of the Pharaoh Merenptah.
19. Les Momies maléfiques (ISBN 2-8001-2739-2); English translation The Evil Mummies (ISBN 978-1-84918-027-6): In the chambers of the temple of Montouhotep, ten bodies of archers of Seqenenre Taa II, dead in combat, are mummified in haste. Meanwhile, Théti's expedition enters the desert but forgets to render homage to Seth.
20. La Colère du grand sphinx (ISBN 2-8001-2445-8 et ISBN 2-8001-2740-6); English translation (ISBN 978-1-84918-115-0): While searching for Théti, Papyrus angers the Great Sphinx.
21. Le Talisman de la grande pyramide (ISBN 2-8001-2591-8): Wanting to discover the origin of the screams heard at the foot of the Great Pyramid each night, Papyrus angers the god Anubis.
22. La Prisonnière de Sekhmet (ISBN 2-8001-2765-1); English translation Sekhmet's Captive (ISBN 978-1800440395): The goddess Sekhmet is upset: the ancient Great Priest of her temple has conceived a diabolical plan in which Princess Théti, the only one capable of calming this divinity, plays a central role.
23. Le Cheval de Troie (ISBN 2-8001-2940-9): Papyrus and Théti arrive in Troy, ruined and occupied by thieves searching in vain for the treasure of King Priam.
24. La main pourpre (ISBN 2-8001-3095-4): Papyrus and Théti find the "purple hand" in Tyre, along with victims of the leaders of the city.
25. Le Pharaon fou (ISBN 2-8001-3229-9): After having escaped from the soldiers of Tyre, Papyrus and Théti find that Pouin has become the king of Dor. After having convinced him to return to Egypt, Papyrus meets a curious character named Moses who is leaving Egypt with his tribe.
26. Le Masque d'Horus (ISBN 2-8001-3354-6): The queen sends Papyrus on a secret mission: to find Théti's younger brother, who was taken by the priests of the temple of Kom Ombo.
27. La Fureur des Dieux (ISBN 2-8001-2721-X): Rameses II the younger hunts a bull in the company of his father, Sethi I.
28. Les Enfants d'Isis: For his services to Egypt, Papyrus is granted land and an estate, but the Pharaoh has a darker, ulterior motive for his generosity. He means to separate Papyrus and Théti, who have come to love each other, so that he can arrange a more prestigious marriage of his daughter with a prince of Mitanni.
29. L'Île de la reine morte
30. L'Oracle
31. L'Or de Pharaon
32. Le taureau de Montou
33. Papyrus Pharaon

== Translations ==
=== English ===
Since November 2007, Cinebook has been publishing Papyrus in English. Seven albums have so far been released:

1. The Rameses Revenge, November 2007, ISBN 978-1-905460-35-9 (translation of the 7th volume)
2. Imhotep's Transformation, April 2008, ISBN 978-1-905460-50-2 (translation of the 8th volume)
3. Tutankhamun, April 2009, ISBN 978-1-905460-84-7 (translation of the 17th volume)
4. The Evil Mummies, April 2010, ISBN 978-1-84918-027-6 (translation of the 19th volume)
5. The Anger of the Great Sphinx, June 2012, ISBN 978-1-84918-115-0 (translation of the 20th volume)
6. The Amulet of the Great Pyramid, June 2015, ISBN 978-1849182409 (translation of the 21st volume)
7. Sekhmet's Captive, March 2022, ISBN 978-1800440395 (translation of the 22nd volume)

=== Spanish ===
In 2020, Dolmen Editorial started publishing integrals of the series in Spanish. As for 2025 it has published 9 volumes containing 27 albums of the series Papyrus. The volumes published by Dolmen Editorial are:

1. "Papyrus 1974-1977." (November 2020) ISBN 978-84-18510-13-7
2. "Papyrus 1978-1982." (March 2021) ISBN 978-84-18510-43-4
3. "Papyrus 1984-1986." (July 2021) ISBN 978-8418898020
4. "Papyrus 1987-1989." (January 2022) ISBN 978-84-18898-43-3
5. "Papyrus 1990-1992." (April 2022) ISBN 978-84-18898-83-9
6. "Papyrus 1993-1995." (October 2022) ISBN 978-84-19380-48-7
7. "Papyrus 1996-1998." (March 2023) ISBN 978-84-19740-07-6
8. "Papyrus 1998-2001." (January 2024) ISBN 978-84-10031-24-1
9. "Papyrus 2002-2004." (January 2025) ISBN 978-84-10390-63-8

== Animated series ==
=== Season 1 ===
1. The Black Mummy
2. Anger of the Moon God
3. Lord of the Crocodiles
4. Revenge of Ramses
5. The Faceless Giant
6. The Cursed Pharaoh
7. The Black Sun of Seth
8. The Metamorphosis of Imhotep
9. The Maze
10. The Triumph of Bastet
11. City of Scribes
12. The Demon of the Red Mountains
13. The Golden Feather of the Great Falcon
14. The Return of the Red Sphinx
15. The White Egyptian
16. The Harp of Hathor
17. The Forgotten Sarcophagus
18. The House of Life
19. The Revenge of Amon
20. The Rebirth of the Child Pharaoh
21. Tears of Giants
22. The Hieroglyph Child
23. The Master of the Three Doors
24. The Black Pyramid
25. The Mirror of Nebou
26. The Second Flood of the Sacred River

=== Season 2 ===
1. The Sacrilege of Papyrus
2. Mika the Sorceress
3. The Thirtieth Case of Senet Cursed
4. Justice Thoueris
5. The Awakening of Osiris
6. White Baboon
7. Stolen Country
8. Four Chapels of Tutankhamun
9. The Divine Potter
10. Return Senkhet
11. The Talisman of the Great Pyramid
12. Yam
13. Time of Discord
14. Seven Knots of Horus
15. Renunciation of Papyrus
16. Nile Red
17. The Sacred Crown of Wadjet
18. Neferure
19. Emissaries
20. Princess Tiya
21. Princess Star
22. The Sacred Child of Ebla
23. The Ished Tree
24. The Djed Pillar
25. The Trial of Papyrus
26. The Nightmare

Canadian animator and cartoonist Guy Delisle documented his experiences while working on this animated series in 1997 in Shenzhen: A Travelogue from China.
