= Shenzhen (disambiguation) =

Shenzhen (深圳市) is a city in China's Guangdong Province.

Shenzhen may also refer to:

- Shenzhen (comics), a graphic novel
- Shenzhen Airlines, airline headquartered in Shenzhen, China
- 2425 Shenzhen, a main-belt asteroid
- Shenzhen, a Type 051B destroyer of the Chinese Navy
- Shenzhen F.C., Chinese professional football club
- Shenzhen Stock Exchange, stock exchange located in Shenzhen, China
- Shenzhen Special Economic Zone, a special economic zone of Shenzhen, China
- Shenzhen railway station, major railway station in Shenzhen, China

== See also ==
- Schengen (disambiguation)
- Shenzun (深圳里), Xinwu District, Taoyuan, Taiwan
