= Undertown =

Undertown may refer to:

- Undertown (comics)
- Undertown (album), by Calm Down Juanita 2002
- Under Town, 2004 book in Edgar & Ellen series
