= Sam Noir =

- Sam Noir issue #1

Publication information
- Publisher: ShadowLine, Image Comics
- Format: Limited series
- Publication date: September 2006—

Creative team
- Written by: Eric A Anderson; Manny Trembley
- Artist(s): Manny Trembley

Sam Noir is a comic book mini-series written by Eric A. Anderson/Manny Trembley and illustrated by Manny Trembley, first published in September 2006.

Rendered in grayscale, the comic is a fusion of hardboiled noir fiction and a samurai adventure tale. While originally a three-issue mini-series, the comic's popularity and critical acclaim caused it to continue, with another 3-issue "Ronin holiday" mini-series getting published by Image's ShadowLine imprint (the last page indicates another mini to be published in June 2007 but as of early 2009 no new series has been announced).

== Plot ==
Sam Noir, a ronin detective, is paid to track a young woman named Jasmine, and after watching her for a while begins to fall in love with her. After Jasmine's murder by ninjas, Sam starts to look for "Master Fuyu", the man who ordered her assassination.

== Reception ==
Comics Bulletin calls Sam Noir's art "fantastic", but the story "more than a little derivative". Broken Frontier stated that "Anderson knows his hard-boiled style ... [making] the reading itself compelling—not to mention witty at times," while the art's "lyrical framing, evocative panel constructions, light and shadow effects [are] so well executed they’re like characters in the story".

Conversely, The X-Axis found the series "frustrating", stating that "it feels like there are two completely different, and better, comics struggling to get out - one which is much more funny, and one which takes [itself] entirely seriously".

== Collected editions ==
- Sam Noir: Volume 1. Image Comics 2007-06-13. ISBN 1-58240-758-4 ISBN 978-1582407586

== See also ==
- Video trailer:
