= Papyrus (video game) =

2000 video game

- Developer: Planet Interactive Development
- Publisher: Ubi Soft
- Platform: Game Boy Color
- Release: February 2000
- Genres: Action, platform
- Mode: Single-player

Papyrus is a 2000 platform video game developed by Planet Interactive Development and published by Ubi Soft for the Game Boy Color. The game is based upon the Belgian comic book series Papyrus by Lucien De Gieter, with the player completing levels set in ancient Egypt as the titular character. Upon release, Papyrus was generally well received by critics, with praise directed to the game's visuals and animations, and criticism to its limited gameplay features and longevity.

== Gameplay ==
A screenshot of Papyrus

Players control the titular Papyrus, an Egyptian fisherman tasked with rescuing the kidnapped Pharaoh's daughter Theti. The game is a platform video game in which players traverse 21 levels across areas including the Forbidden Forest to the Pharaoh's Tomb, with the objective to reach the exit of the level, defeating a boss at the end of each. Players can attack, jump, climb, and hang from objects including vines. The game contains a password save system and an Ubi Key. The Ubi Key is a feature contained in some Ubisoft Game Boy Color titles that allows players to trade unique items found in Ubisoft games to unlock additional content using the infrared link: in Papyrus, this includes a secret level. Completing a level unlocks a second playable character, Theti, who has minor changes to content when replaying levels.

== Development ==
Ubisoft announced Papyrus at the 1999 European Computer Trade Show with the intent of a Europe-only release, and showcased the game at the Cannes Milia trade show in February 2000.

== Reception ==
Reception

Review scores
Publication	Score
Eurogamer	6/10
Hyper	7/10
IGN	7/10
Game Boy Official Magazine	78%

Reception of Papyrus was generally positive. Tim Jones of IGN praised the game as a "joy to play", highlighting the game's variety of themed levels with "sharp" and "vivid" graphics, "clear and excellently animated" sprites and "fluid, responsive controls". On the negative side, Jones felt that the game lacked unique gameplay features to distinguish the game from the "endless supply of traditional platformers", although he still recommended the title. Describing the game as a "nicely made platformer", Eliot Fish of Hyper praised the game's "top-notch" animation, control and level design and "fun" platforming, although noted that "there isn't any great mental challenge". Game Boy Official Magazine praised the graphics as "great", but considered gameplay to only last a "few days play".
