= Jerusalem: Chronicles from the Holy City =

2008 graphic novel by Guy Delisle

- Cover of the English-language edition
- Author: Guy Delisle
- Cover artist: Guy Delisle
- Language: French, English, Spanish
- Genre: Graphic novel, Memoir
- Publisher: Drawn & Quarterly
- Media type: Print (hardcover)
- Pages: 334

Jerusalem: Chronicles from the Holy City, originally published in French as Chroniques de Jérusalem, is a 2012 graphic novel written and illustrated by Guy Delisle. Jerusalem is a travelogue and memoir in which Delisle recounts his trip to Jerusalem, parts of Palestine and the West Bank, as well as within Israel, with his two young children and his long-term partner, Nadège, who went there to do administrative work for Médecins Sans Frontières (MSF).

== Summary ==
The book recounts Delisle's year-long trip to Jerusalem with his long-term spouse, Nadège, and their two young children. They arrived in August 2008. Delisle lived in Beit Hanina during his stay in the region.

== Background ==
Before Jerusalem, Delisle had previously written three other graphic novel travelogues. They are, in order of publication: Shenzhen, about his trip to Shenzhen, an economic hub of Southern China; Pyongyang, about his stay in Pyongyang, the capital of The Democratic People's Republic of Korea; and Burma Chronicles, about his stay in Rangoon, the then-capital of Myanmar. He went to Shenzhen and Pyongyang for his work in animation, while he went to Burma to accompany his partner, Nadège, as she did her work for MSF. While in Jerusalem, Delisle again worked primarily as a stay-at-home dad, taking care of their two young children while Nadège was working.

When it was released in English in April 2012, it was perhaps Delisle's most-anticipated book.

== Style and themes ==
Delisle uses simple line drawings that are "plain and clean and casual without being sloppy". And although Jerusalem is Delisle's first book to feature color, Delisle uses it only sparingly, to center attention on certain important objects, including maps, loud noises, or memories.

In the book, Delisle frequently encounters aspects of the Israeli–Palestinian conflict and depicts arguments from each side without openly divulging where his sympathies lie.

== Reception ==
Tim Peters of Slant Magazine summed up, "As a whole, the book is both enjoyable and instructive; it makes you chuckle and grin, and it makes you feel like a more informed, concerned citizen of the world."

== Awards ==
- Fauve d'Or : Prix du meilleur album, Angoulême 2012
- Prix Bédéis causa (Albéric-Bourgeois)
- Meilleur Album Reportage, Solliès-Ville 2012
- Prix littéraire des lycéens d'Ile-de-France 2013
- Prix Segalen des Lycéens d'Asie 2013
- Independent Publisher Book Awards Results - Graphic Novel 2013

== See also ==
- Burma Chronicles
- Pyongyang: A Journey in North Korea
- Shenzhen: A Travelogue from China
