= Schengen (disambiguation) =

The Schengen Area is the group of European countries that have abolished border controls between each other.

Schengen may refer to:

- Schengen acquis, a set of rules and legislation which regulates border controls in respect to the Schengen Area
  - Schengen Agreement, the initial 1985 European treaty that provided for the removal of border controls between participating countries
- Schengen, Luxembourg, the Luxembourgish village and commune nearest to where the Schengen Agreement was signed
- "Schengen", a song on the album Caravane by Raphael
- Military Mobility, also called Military Schengen

== See also ==
- Schengen Information System, a European governmental database related to border security and law enforcement
- Schengen visa, a travel document valid for the entire Schengen Area
- Shenzhen (disambiguation)
