= Bruce Wayne: The Road Home =

2010 event comic by DC Comics

- Cover of Bruce Wayne: The Road Home deluxe edition; art by Shane Davis

Publication information
- Publisher: DC Comics
- Title(s): Full list
- Formats: Original material for the series has been published as a set of one-shot comics.
- Genre: Superhero
- Publication date: December 2010
- Number of issues: 9
- Main character(s): Batman; Robin; Red Robin; Batgirl; Outsiders; Catwoman; Commissioner Gordon; Oracle; Ra's al Ghul

Creative team
- Writer(s): Batman and Robin; Fabian Nicieza; Red Robin; Fabian Nicieza; Batgirl; Bryan Q. Miller; Outsiders; Mike W. Barr; Catwoman; Derek Fridolfs; Commissioner Gordon; Adam Beechen; Oracle; Marc Andreyko; Ra's al Ghul; Fabian Nicieza
- Artist(s): Batman and Robin; Cliff Richards; Batgirl; Pere Pérez; Commissioner Gordon; Szymon Kudranski; Oracle; Agustín Padilla
- Penciller(s): Red Robin; Ramon Bachs; Outsiders; Javier Saltares; Catwoman; Peter Nguyen; Ra's al Ghul; Scott McDaniel
- Inker(s): Red Robin; John Lucas; Outsiders; Rebecca Buchman; Walden Wong; Catwoman; Ryan Winn; Ra's al Ghul; Andy Owens

Reprints
- Collected editions
- Hardcover: ISBN 1-4012-3081-4

Bruce Wayne: The Road Home is a month-long event comic published by the comic book publishing company DC Comics in December 2010. The event was intended as a conclusion to Batman: The Return of Bruce Wayne limited series and as a bridge to the ongoing story of the Batman family.

The event deals with the return of the original Batman after his journey through time and the effect that it has on a number of Gotham City's heroes and villains, particularly upon Dick Grayson, who has been using his mentor's mantle since Battle for the Cowl.

During October 2010, all Batman titles were suspended in favor of eight one-shots, each dealing with a hero or villain. A final, ninth one-shot simply titled "Batman: The Return" rounded out the event and acted as a launching pad for the new continuity of the Batman universe, specifically for Batman Incorporated, a subsequent monthly ongoing title written by Grant Morrison.

== Titles ==
Titles in the event include:

- Batman #703 (prelude)
- Bruce Wayne: The Road Home: Batman and Robin #1
- Bruce Wayne: The Road Home: Red Robin #1
- Bruce Wayne: The Road Home: Outsiders #1
- Bruce Wayne: The Road Home: Batgirl #1
- Bruce Wayne: The Road Home: Catwoman #1
- Bruce Wayne: The Road Home: Commissioner Gordon #1
- Bruce Wayne: The Road Home: Oracle #1
- Bruce Wayne: The Road Home: Ra's al Ghul #1
- Batman: The Return #1

== Plot synopsis ==
Promotional art of Bruce Wayne: The Road Home; art by Shane Davis

More than one year after the supposed death of Batman during Final Crisis, Bruce Wayne returns, armed with a new technologically advanced suit, as well as a new identity, The Insider. The Insider, recording his exploits in the White Casebook, determines how each of the people that played a great part in the life of the first Batman have been coping since his death.

=== Batman and Robin ===
Batman and Robin successfully take down an incarnation of the Hangmen. Although most of the Hangmen are defeated, one of them manages to escape. Batman reveals that he orchestrated the escape of one of the members in order to know more about them. Watching Dick Grayson and Damian Wayne throughout this mission is the Insider, who comments both on Dick's acceptance of being Batman, Grayson's success on keeping Damian in line, as well as the dynamic both brothers share as Batman and Robin. When Dick and Damian trace the last member to his hideout, they are interrupted by the Insider. Their fight causes a massive explosion that allows the member to escape. Despite the machinations of Insider, Batman and Robin eventually capture the escaping final member. It is revealed that the escape of the member would have been used by the Insider for a much grander plan, but was interrupted by Dick and Damian. By the end of the issue, Bruce Wayne does not reveal himself to either Batman or Robin.

=== Red Robin ===
Tim Drake is in Amsterdam continuing his mission from Bruce. Tim is fighting a group called the Council of Spiders. Prudence shows up to give Tim a hand. Bruce shows up for a quick glimpse and attacks Tim and Prudence to set the scene. Tim and Prudence escape and talk about The Global Assassination Tournament. First the Hangmen try to kill the mayor of Gotham now the Council of Spiders is trying to kill the mayor in Amsterdam. Prudence sends a mysterious text message to someone. Vicki Vale shows up at Wayne Manor to talk to Alfred. She shows him the tracer and Alfred tells Vicki what has been going on with Bruce. Vicki is elated that Alfred just spilled but she is sad that Bruce almost died. Alfred tells her that no one will believe her and that the tracer is just a toy. Bruce is doing some under cover work for the Council of Spiders. He battles Tim but then switches the game on the Spiders. Bruce and Tim are staying at a hotel and Bruce is suspicious of Prudence. At the end Prudence is seen on the phone talking to Ra's al Ghul about Bruce and Tim.

=== Outsiders ===
The road home continues into the Outsiders. In Markovia there have been riots against Geo-Force and even assassins hired to kill him. Looker returns and greets Katana. Halo does not remember Looker because of her memory issues. Vicki Vale decides to meet up with Creeper for some journalistic advice. She asks him about publishing something that she knows can hurt certain people and he tells her not to. Geo-Force is happy to see Looker again. The Outsiders go out into the riot and try to stop it without hurting anyone. The entire time Bruce has been watching the Outsiders and taking notes in his journal. Bruce fights each of them and wins, even against Geo-Force. At the end, Bruce is talking to Katana and she says that she missed him. He wants her to keep an eye on the Outsiders and he leaves.

=== Batgirl ===
Stephanie is fighting the Insider, who is stealing a rifle from Waynetech R&D. He runs away but, Stephanie is not hurt. Oracle tells Steph that she should stay away from him and maybe leave it to the Birds and Steph promises she will leave it alone but, with her fingers crossed behind her back. So, she asks for Proxy (Wendy Harris)'s help and beats up some guys in the alley. She then goes to the presentation at Crime Alley because she knew that the Insider was targeting someone on stage. She finds the Insider and she says that he must be very clever or very sloppy. Then the Insider shows himself and he is Bruce. Steph slaps him in the face, and departs, remarking "I'm glad you aren't dead". Meanwhile, Vicki Vale stops Barbara and says she has made the connection that she was Batgirl but she denies it. Barbara managed to clone Vicki's data and find out what she know. Steph meets up with Bruce and Steph has a long talk with him, saying that being Batgirl was the first time in her life that she is doing things because she wants to, and he cannot take that away from her. He allows her to stay Batgirl. Bruce meets up with Alfred and Bruce sees that Alfred really believes in Stephanie. Alfred asks why Bruce has not looked for Cassandra Cain and that was because Bruce already knows where she is and so does Tim. Bruce says it was all part of his plan for Cassandra to let Stephanie become Batgirl.

=== Catwoman ===
Selina Kyle and Poison Ivy are at a very exclusive party at Club V. Selina is following Vicki Vale to see what she's doing there and catch her next move. There is also an auction at the party and there is one item in particular that catches Selina's eye. It's the Fabled Pink Mynx. It brings memories back to Selina about a time when she tried to steal it at a party and Bruce chased after her. All of a sudden Harley Quinn bursts through the doors and is livid. She sees her "babies" in cages and sets them free. Everyone runs out of the building. Vicki was at the auction to meet with a secret informant from Wayne Industries that did not turn up. She was at her apartment when she gets a call from the informant and leaves her apartment unattended. Selina sneaks in through the window and finds all the information Vicki has on them. She sees that Vicki even has info on her. Vicki comes back in and Selina leaves. Selina is waiting on top of the roof and Bruce comes up to her as his current alias Insider. He wants to know the info she gathered from Vicki's apartment and she tells him. Bruce then says something to Selina that takes her back years ago and it suddenly clicks that she knows it's Bruce.

=== Commissioner Gordon ===
Commissioner Gordon on the cover of Bruce Wayne: The Road Home: Commissioner Gordon (vol. 1) (December 2010); art by Shane Davis

The Penguin sends two supervillains (one superstrong and one with electrical powers) after Vicki Vale. She herself was at the GCPD having rough talks with Gordon when the two supervillains attack with the aid of corrupt cops. While they try to escape, the Insider is alerted by Oracle, with whom he had earlier made contact, of the situation. He arrives at GCPD and beats the 2 villains. He has some talks with Gordon and tells him to allow Vicki to leave before leaving himself. Later, Oracle informs Bruce who ordered the Penguin to send the villains: Ra's al Ghul.

=== Oracle ===
Oracle is helping the Insider get Vicki Vale out of harm's way from Ra's al Ghul's army. The Insider asks Oracle to get some help to beat the army of Ra's al Ghul named "The Seven Men of Death". She was going to get the regular Birds of Prey but they are overseas. Instead she gets Hawk, Dove, Man-Bat, Batgirl, Ragman, and Manhunter. Oracle thinks of her past and how she was ready to give up when she lost the use of her legs. Bruce told her she cannot give up and with those words she never did give up. Batgirl then contacts Oracle and Oracle stops thinking of the past. Batgirl tells her that she and her team are ready to fight "The Seven Men of Death". They fight them. Vicki gets caught in an explosion but the Insider saves her. As the Insider gets attacked Vicki runs and reaches a pay phone, but she gets captured.

=== Ra's al Ghul ===
Vicki is eventually rescued by Bruce, and gives the immortal her word that she will never reveals his secrets. Vicki realizes that Bruce's mission is bigger than the truth she's seeking, and decides not to expose his secrets and to become his ally. During the conflict, Ra's realizes that Vicki is a descendant of Marcel du Valliere, a French soldier and one of the few who challenged Ra's and his warriors centuries before Batman. Ra's claims that du Valliere stole the woman he attempted to court with.

== Collected edition ==
| Title | Material collected | Published date | ISBN |
|---|---|---|---|
| Batman: Bruce Wayne: The Road Home | Bruce Wayne: The Road Home – Batman and Robin #1, Bruce Wayne: The Road Home – Red Robin #1, Bruce Wayne: The Road Home – Outsiders #1, Bruce Wayne: The Road Home – Batgirl #1, Bruce Wayne: The Road Home – Catwoman #1, Bruce Wayne: The Road Home – Commissioner Gordon #1, Bruce Wayne: The Road Home – Oracle #1, and Bruce Wayne: The Road Home – Ra's al Ghul #1 | July 2011 | 978-1401230814 |
