= Burma Chronicles =

2007 graphic novel by Guy Delisle

- Cover of the English-language edition
- Author: Guy Delisle
- Cover artist: Guy Delisle
- Language: English
- Genre: Graphic novel, Memoir
- Publisher: Drawn & Quarterly
- Media type: Print (hardcover)
- Pages: 263 p.

See Burmese chronicles for the royal chronicles of Burma (Myanmar).

Burma Chronicles (French: Chroniques Birmanes) is a 2007 Canadian graphic novel written and illustrated by Guy Delisle. Burma Chronicles is a travelogue about Delisle's time spent in Burma with his young son, Louis, and his wife, Nadège, an administrator for Médecins Sans Frontières (MSF). Originally written in French, the book was translated into English by Helge Dascher and published by Drawn & Quarterly in 2008.

== Summary ==
The book recounts Guy Delisle's trip to the southeast Asian country which is officially recognized by the United Nations as Myanmar but that is referred to as Burma by countries that do not recognize the military junta that controls it. Delisle went with his infant son, Louis, and his wife, Nadège, an administrator for Médecins Sans Frontières (MSF). At the beginning of the trip, the family must stay in an MSF guest house while they search for more permanent housing. Guy stays home and takes care of Louis while Nadège is frequently absent on MSF business. Guy takes Louis on frequent walks around the neighborhood in his stroller and interacts with local people in Burma.

== Background ==
Delisle had previously documented his traveling to countries under oppressive regimes in the graphic novel Pyongyang, which focused on his extended trip to North Korea.

== Style and themes ==
Burma Chronicles, like Delisle's other graphic travelogues, features a simple drawing style. The book tells mostly slice-of-life stories and does not focus on politics.

== Reception ==
Burma Chronicles was generally well received. The New Yorker, in a short review, praised the book's simple and lively art style and noted Delisle's keen observation of the unexpected. Rory MacLean, in a review for The Guardian, also praised the book's "fantastic verve" and called it "the most enlightening and insightful book on Burma in years."

In a review for the Literary Review of Canada, Jeet Heer called Burma Chronicles Delisle's best book. Heer contrasted Delisle's style of travel writing favorably to the "hit-and-run style" of writers like Thomas Friedman. Steve Duin of The Oregonian also praised the book, saying at the end of his review, "Because I've never been to Burma, I don't know that Burma Chronicles is the perfect travel guide to this land of sweltering heat and monsoons. But it is a marvelous graphic memoir of a year in the life in a remote world that is beyond the ability of most readers to grasp." Kirstin Butler of The Atlantic included Burma Chronicles on a list of ten masterpieces of graphic nonfiction.

Edith Mirante of The Irrawaddy was more critical of the book, calling Delisle's grasp on Burmese politics "literally sketchy" and saying that Delisle lacked "the black and white bravura of other graphic storytellers such as Marjane Satrapi... or Alison Bechdel...".

== See also ==
- Jerusalem: Chronicles from the Holy City
- Pyongyang: A Journey in North Korea
- Shenzhen: A Travelogue from China
