= Don't Forget To Validate Your Parking =

Webcomic by Mike Le

- Author: Mike Le
- Website: dontforgettovalidateyourparking.com
- Current status/schedule: Completed
- Launch date: 2007-12-11

Don't Forget To Validate Your Parking is a webcomic written and illustrated by American screenwriter, film producer, and comic book creator Mike Le. The webcomic was officially launched on December 11, 2007, during the 2007-2008 Writers Guild of America strike. Published roughly once a week, the webcomic is loosely based on the author's experiences working in Hollywood. Its readership grew significantly when blogger Cory Doctorow posted a link to the webcomic on Boing Boing.

The only visible character in Mike Le's webcomic is an illustrated version of Le himself, sitting behind his laptop and on the phone. All supporting characters are expressed through dialogue, usually as a voice on the phone.

== Syndication ==
Don't Forget To Validate Your Parking was published regularly in the humor section of The Behrend Beacon, the official student publication of the Penn State Erie, The Behrend College.

== Reception ==
Ain't It Cool News described Don't Forget To Validate Your Parking as a "diamond in the internet rough" and praised its simplicity, calling it "a fun experiment with the genre and a testament to the writing skills of ... Mike Le." On August 5, 2008, PC Magazine listed Don't Forget To Validate Your Parking in its "Top 10 Best Unsung Webcomics".
