= Pyongyang: A Journey in North Korea =

2003 graphic novel by Guy Delisle

Pyongyang
- Cover of the English-language paperback edition
- Author: Guy Delisle
- Cover artist: Guy Delisle
- Language: French
- Genre: Graphic novel, memoir
- Publisher: Drawn & Quarterly
- Media type: Print (hardcover, paperback)
- Pages: 176

Pyongyang: A Journey in North Korea is a black-and-white non-fiction graphic novel by the Canadian Québécois author Guy Delisle, published in 2003. The novel details the months Delisle spent in Pyongyang while working for a French animation company.

== Overview ==
Pyongyang documents Delisle's experiences in Pyongyang, the capital of North Korea, where he stayed for two months. Acting as the liaison between a French animation producing company (Protécréa working for TF1) and the SEK Studio (Scientific Educational Korea) company, he struggles with the difficulties of outsourcing and the bureaucracy of the totalitarian closed state.

The book has 176 pages, two of them drawn by a French colleague ("Fabrice").

It was drawn in Ethiopia, where Delisle's wife was working for Médecins Sans Frontières.

Delisle does not expect to return to North Korea, writing: "I don't think I would be welcome there anymore."

== Summary ==
Delisle arrives in Pyongyang, bringing, in addition to the items that he was authorized to bring into the country, a copy of George Orwell's Nineteen Eighty-Four, that he judged appropriate for a totalitarian state, CDs of Aphex Twin, and presents like Gitanes cigarettes and Hennessy cognac.

Delisle encounters former colleagues working at SEK Studio on an adaptation of the Corto Maltese comics. He also meets foreign diplomats, NGO workers in the World Food Programme and businessmen, such as French engineers installing an HDTV transmitter.

During his two-month visit, he stays at the Yanggakdo International Hotel, and visits other foreigners in the Koryo Hotel. Accompanied by his guide, he visits the massive statue of Kim Il Sung, the Pyongyang Metro, the legation quarter, the Diplomatic Club (former Romanian embassy), the Arch of Triumph, the Juche Tower, the International Friendship Exhibition, the USS Pueblo, the enormous Ryugyong Hotel, the Taekwondo Hall, the Children's Palace and the Museum of Imperialist Occupation.

Delisle notes things such as tightrope walking, the absence of disabled and elderly people, North Korean music propaganda, the cult of personality for past leader Kim Il Sung and his son Kim Jong Il, the required presence of his translator and guide, nearly-expired water from the South, Coca-Cola and kimjongilias. He also notes the extreme level of apparent brainwashing in the citizens of Pyongyang, perhaps prompted by the oppressive atmosphere of the area. When questioned regarding the lack of disabled people in Pyongyang, his guide asserts and seems to genuinely believe that North Korea has none, and that the children of the "Korean race" are all born healthy, strong and intelligent.

== Publication ==
The English version was translated from French by Helge Dascher, and published by Canadian publisher Drawn & Quarterly. A new English version with new cover design and introduction by Gore Verbinski has been published.

== Cancelled film ==
New Regency was working on a film version of Pyongyang, with Steve Conrad to write the script and Gore Verbinski to direct the film, and to star Steve Carell. This was cancelled in December 2014 in the wake of response to the film The Interview, when the film's production company was hacked by North Korean operatives and threats were made against cinemas planning to show the film. Pre-production had begun in October 2014, and at the time of cancellation was still without a title. New Regency revealed that the scheduled distributor, Fox, cancelled their participation in the project after the incidents with The Interview.

== See also ==
- Burma Chronicles
- Jerusalem: Chronicles from the Holy City
- Shenzhen: A Travelogue from China
