= Doug Marlette =

American editorial cartoonist

- Born: Douglas Nigel Marlette; December 6, 1949 Greensboro, North Carolina, U.S.
- Died: July 10, 2007 (aged 57) Marshall County, Mississippi, U.S.
- Area: cartoonist
- Notable works: Editorial cartoons, Kudzu

Douglas Nigel Marlette (December 6, 1949 – July 10, 2007) was a Pulitzer Prize-winning American editorial cartoonist who, at the time of his death, had also published two novels and was "finding his voice in writing long-length fiction." His popular comic strip Kudzu, distributed by Tribune Media Services from 1981 to 2007, was adapted into a musical comedy.

Born in Greensboro, North Carolina, Marlette was raised in Durham, North Carolina; Laurel, Mississippi; and Sanford, Florida.

Marlette began his cartooning career while a student at Seminole Community College where he worked on the student newspaper. He then went on to Florida State University where he drew political cartoons for The Florida Flambeau, from 1969 to 1971. He illustrated the 1970-71 FSU yearbook, Tally Ho, including a wraparound cover.

Marlette was the cartoonist for The Charlotte Observer (1972–1987), The Atlanta Journal-Constitution (1987–89) for which he won a Pulitzer Prize in 1988, New York Newsday (1989–02), The Tallahassee Democrat (2002–06) and The Tulsa World (2006–07).

In 2002, he drew criticism from Islamic groups for drawing a cartoon depicting Mohammed driving a Ryder van with missiles pointed out the back and the caption, "What would Mohammed drive?"

== Kudzu ==
He wrote and drew the internationally syndicated comic strip Kudzu, which launched June 15, 1981. Marlette collaborated with Bland Simpson and Jack Herrick of the Red Clay Ramblers on a musical comedy adaptation of the strip, Kudzu, A Southern Musical.

His work appeared in Time and Newsweek, along with newspapers such as The New York Times and The Washington Post.

== Awards and honors ==
In 1981, Marlette became the first cartoonist ever awarded a Nieman Fellowship. He won every major award for editorial cartooning, including the 1988 Pulitzer Prize for Editorial Cartooning, the National Headliner Award for Consistently Outstanding Editorial Cartoons (three times) and first prize in the John Fischetti Memorial Cartoon Competition (twice). In 1997, he won his second Robert F. Kennedy Journalism Award.

Two days after Marlette's death, North Carolina Governor Michael F. Easley awarded him the honor of membership in the Order of the Long Leaf Pine, the highest civilian honor bestowed by the governor of North Carolina.

== Books ==
Kudzu and his editorial cartoons are collected in 19 volumes, including Faux Bubba: Bill and Hillary Go to Washington, Gone with the Kudzu, I Feel Your Pain!, What Would Marlette Drive? and A Town So Backwards Even the Episcopalians Handle Snakes.

His 1991 book, In Your Face: A Cartoonist at Work, was his personal account of the cartooning process.

In 2001, his first novel, The Bridge, was published by HarperCollins. The Bridge won the 2002 SIBA Book Award (Best Book of the Year Fiction) sponsored by the Southern Independent Booksellers Alliance (SIBA).

In 2006, his second novel, Magic Time, was published by Sarah Crichton Books/Farrar, Straus & Giroux and received critical praise, including a positive review in The New York Times Book Review.

== Academic life ==
Marlette served as distinguished visiting professor in the School of Journalism and Mass Communication at the University of North Carolina at Chapel Hill in the 2001–2002 academic year and was inducted into the UNC Journalism Hall of Fame in 2002. In 2006, he was appointed a Gaylord Distinguished Visiting Lecturer at the College of Journalism and Mass Communication at the University of Oklahoma.

== Personal life ==
Marlette and his wife, TV producer Melinda Hartley Marlette, split their time between residences in Tulsa, Oklahoma and Hillsborough, North Carolina. Their son, Jackson, studied art in France. Marlette had a brother, Chris, and a sister, Marianne. His nephew, Andy Marlette, worked for 15 years at the Pensacola News Journal in Florida as a columnist, illustrator and cartoonist. As of September 2022, he no longer worked at the News Journal but was distributed by Creators Syndicate.

Marlette was a close friend of author Pat Conroy, speaking to him daily.

== Death ==
Marlette died in Marshall County, Mississippi, a passenger in a Toyota pickup truck that hydroplaned and struck a tree in heavy rain; Marlette died instantly. He was traveling from Memphis International Airport to Oxford, Mississippi to help students at Oxford High School prepare for their performance of Kudzu, A Southern Musical at the Edinburgh Fringe Festival. Marlette died less than a week after he delivered the eulogy for his father, Elmer Monroe Marlette, in Charlotte, North Carolina. He was buried at Walnut Grove United Methodist Church near Hillsborough on July 14, 2007. Conroy and Joe Klein eulogized him at the funeral, before an overflow crowd. There were ten eulogists in all, and Conroy called Marlette his best friend and said, "The first person to cry, when he heard about Doug's death, was God."
