= Hiding in Time =

Comic book miniseries

Cover of the first issue

Hiding in Time is an Image Comics mini-series, edited and published in 2007 by Jim Valentino at ShadowLine Comics. The story was written by Christopher E. Long, penciled and inked by Ryan Winn, and colored by Igor Noronha. The three-part series had a limited release but was well received and optioned by Warner Brothers for a major motion picture.

== Synopsis ==
Issue One

In the near future the Witness Protection Program will relocate, to various eras in time, those who turn in State's Evidence. But the list of transplanted witnesses is discovered and hit squads are sent through time. The protagonist, Nathan Crew – a simple technician in the now-defunct Time Portal Division of the WPP – is forced to travel back in time to try to warn the witnesses.

Issue Two

Abraham Smith has been relocated to 1774 but is followed by three assassins from the future. Outgunned and outnumbered he must decide whether to abandon his new life and family.

Issue Three

Nathan Crew is an accidental tourist in Colonial America who is swept up in the events unfolding before him, including having Benjamin Franklin coax him into being an unwitting participant in the Boston Tea Party. But his vacation comes to an abrupt end when three killers from the future arrive to settle accounts.

== Press and Previews ==
During an interview with Comic Book Resources, Christopher Long and Ryan Winn promoted the release of the series that was originally slated to be a four-issue series. The series was eventually published as only three issues.

Comic Book Resources gave readers a 9-page sneak preview of the first issue in July 2007 and a 5-page preview of the third issue in October 2007.

Issue #2 was solicited with an alternative cover image that was not printed.

== Publication history ==
- Hiding in Time # 1 was published July 2007. Its original cover price $3.50.
- Hiding in Time # 2 was published Published August 2007. Its original cover price $3.50.
- Hiding in Time # 3 was published Published October 2007. Its original cover price $3.50.

== Television adaptation ==
A television series adaptation of the comic is in the works. Whalerock Industries' Lloyd Braun, Andrew Mittman of MGM Television, and Long are set to serve as an co-executive producers. Ray Miller and David Server are set to be producers as well. In 2023, Colin Trevorrow’s Metronome Film Company joined the production of the TV series entitled “Halcyon,” with Davey Holmes set as the showrunner for Amazon Prime Video.
