= Christian Beranek =

American graphic novelist, actor, musician and film/television producer

- Born: August 23, 1974 (age 52) Council Bluffs, Iowa
- Areas: Writer, actress, musician, producer

Christian Beranek (born August 23, 1974) is a United States writer, actress, musician and film/TV producer.

== Biography ==
Beranek was born in Council Bluffs, Iowa, though she regards herself as a native of Glenwood. She currently resides near Santa Fe, New Mexico and is a writer, producer, and consultant. Beranek is a trans woman. Her graphic novel credits include Dracula vs. King Arthur, Silent Forest and Outlaw Territory. She wrote, produced and starred in the 2004 indie film Caucasian Brown and has acted in several shorts for Pdflo Films.

In 2008 Beranek signed a deal with Walt Disney Pictures to help launch Kingdom Comics.

Beranek has developed prequel and origin material for the films Seven, Babylon A.D. and Max Payne.

In 2010 Beranek co-launched The Webcomic Factory with co-creator Tony DiGerolamo. The site provides daily webcomic content. Beranek continues to write material there.

In 2013 Beranek launched the webcomic series Validation with Kelci Crawford.

== Works ==
=== Bibliography ===
Comic book work includes:

- Silent Devils (OGN, writer, with art by Chris Burke, co-creator with David Fairley, Silent Devil, 2003)
- Silent Forest:
  - Silent Forest The Graphic Novel (OGN, co-writer and co-creator with Adam Beranek and Father Nicholas Misty, art by various, Silent Devil, 2004)
  - Silent Forest Television Parody Special (OGN, co-writer and co-creator with Adam Beranek, art by various, Silent Devil, 2005)
- Dracula vs. King Arthur (4 issue mini-series, hardcover collection and TPB, co-writer with Adam Beranek, art by Chris Moreno, co-creator, Silent Devil, 2005–2006)
- "16 Gets You 20" (back-up story in The Gift #13, co-writer with Mr. Nova, art by Tony Fleecs, Image Comics, 2006)
- Se7en #4: Lust (7 issue mini-series, hardcover collection, co-writer with Adam Beranek, art by Steven Perkins, Zenescope, 2007)
- Grimm Fairy Tales Annual 2007 (one-shot, writer Little Boy Blue segment, art by Siya, Zenescope, 2007)
- Starship Troopers #9-10 (ongoing series, co-writer on Triple Threat two-parter, AAM/Markosia, 2008)
- Willow Creek #0-1 (co-writer with Denny Williams, art by Josh Medors, co-creator, Zenescope, 2008)
- "Ahiga" (short story in Outlaw Territory Volume 1, art by Koray Kuranel, creator, Image Comics, 2009)
- Japanese Schoolgirls in Love #1 (co-writer with Tony DiGerolamo, art by Alfa Robbi, co-creator, The Webcomic Factory, 2010)
- "Forever is a Long Time" (short story in Outlaw Territory Volume 2, art by Vivian Lee, creator, Image Comics, 2011)
- Post Apocalyptic Nick (co-writer with Tony DiGerolamo, art by Tom Kurzanski, co-creator, The Webcomic Factory, 2013)

=== Filmography ===
Film work includes:

- Caucasian Brown (2004)
- Thai Smile (2006)
- The Kings of YouTube (Tubedeedo) Extended Edition (2008)
- Babylon A.D.: Genesis of Aurora (2008)
- Max Payne: Michelle Payne (2009)
