= Shenzhen: A Travelogue from China =

2000 graphic novel by Guy Delisle

- Cover of the English-language edition
- Author: Guy Delisle
- Cover artist: Guy Delisle
- Language: French, English
- Genre: Graphic novel, memoir
- Published: 2000 (Drawn & Quarterly)
- Media type: Print (hardcover, paperback)
- ISBN: 0-224-07991-3

Shenzhen: A Travelogue from China is a comic book written by the Canadian Québécois author Guy Delisle. It documents Delisle's three-month deployment in December 1997 to Shenzhen, a big city developed by the People's Republic of China near Hong Kong. In the city, he acts as the liaison between Dupuis, a Belgian animation production company and a Chinese studio, where Chinese animators draw child-oriented films (Papyrus) from the layout phase taking the French storyboards as a guide.

He struggles with boredom, the difficulties of outsourcing and the culture shock of a Westerner in this profit-oriented Chinese city. The book has 145 pages. Some of the frames are drawn by Chinese artists and by a friend of Delisle's.

== Plot ==
Delisle had already been to China in Nanjing. He is deployed to Shenzhen as part of an outsourcing project, where he will spend three months in the Great Wall Hotel. Unlike in Hong Kong, there are not many bilingual Chinese so he has language problems during his stay, including with the interpreters at work. Often he has to recourse to drawing or pointing to communicate. Among his experiences of life in Shenzhen include a visit to a Chinese dentist to cure a toothache, but after seeing the unhygienic conditions of the clinic, he is relieved to find out it is just a case of mesialization.

Since the main leisure activity in Shenzhen is shopping, Delisle tries to read books, works for L'Association's Lapin magazine, and buys Chinese artbooks (drawings by children, Wang Chi Yun, and Hu Buo Zhong). He realizes that the Spirou that he liked as a child is no longer funny. An allegory he applies to the Chinese rural exodus is the Divine Comedy, with the Chinese countryside as the Inferno; the USA as the Paradiso; and the big Chinese cities, Shenzhen and Hong Kong as intermediate rings. He finds a copy of Théodore Poussin.

His Chinese-speaking acquaintances bring him to try Chinese food.

He finds Guangzhou and Hong Kong more interesting than Shenzhen.

The only tourist attraction he visits in the new city is the Window of the World, since his Chinese friends are not interested in Splendid China Folk Village. He spends a Christmas dinner with a Chinese animator who, while a fan of Rembrandt, has only a black-and-white photo of Bathsheba at Her Bath.

There is less political commentary than in his later graphic novel Pyongyang.

== See also ==
- Burma Chronicles
- Jerusalem: Chronicles from the Holy City
- Pyongyang: A Journey in North Korea
