= Kudzu (comic strip) =

American comic strip by Doug Marlette

- Doug Marlette's first Kudzu Sunday strip in 1981 toured Bypass.
- Author(s): Doug Marlette
- Current status/schedule: Concluded daily & Sunday strip
- Launch date: June 15, 1981
- End date: August 26, 2007
- Syndicate(s): Universal Press Syndicate
- Genre(s): Humor, the South

Kudzu was a daily comic strip by Pulitzer Prize-winning editorial cartoonist Doug Marlette about rural Southerners. Distributed by Universal Press Syndicate, the strip ran from June 15, 1981 to August 26, 2007.

The title came from the kudzu vine which was introduced to the Southern United States (and initially encouraged) as a soil erosion control plant, but soon became an out-of-control invasive species.

== Publication history ==
The daily strip was launched on a Monday, June 15, 1981. At its peak, it was syndicated in 300 newspapers.

Marlette was killed in a car accident on July 10, 2007, in Marshall County, Mississippi. Kudzu is no longer in syndication; the last daily was published on August 4, 2007. The Sunday strips ran until August 26, 2007.

== Characters and story ==
The cast included Kudzu Dubose, Nasal T. Lardbottom, Rev. Will B. Dunn, Ida Mae Wombat, Veranda Tadsworth and NASCAR Dad. Comics historian Don Markstein described the strip's characters:

The nominal star of Kudzu is Kudzu Dubose, a 16-year-old resident of Bypass, NC... The real star is Rev. Will B. Dunn, a minister who in some ways conforms to the stereotype of the Southern preacher—loud, always ready to speak his mind, and somewhat more materialistic in the eyes of others than in his own self-image. But in other ways, such as his ready sarcasm and a rather eccentric way of looking at the world, he's unique. Apparently, readers take to him more enthusiastically than they would to a more conventional fire'n'brimstone type, because the first entry in the successful series of Kudzu reprints in paperback appeared the year the strip began. Other regulars include Kudzu's mom (pushy and possessive, but loving), Uncle Dub (Kudzu's main male role model), Veranda Tadsworth (Kudzu's lust object, considerably less interested in him than he is in her) and Maurice Jackson (Kudzu's pal). The town of Bypass is a small Southern hamlet, with all the favorable and annoying traits that implies, affectionately rendered by Marlette, himself a native of North Carolina.

Will B. Dunn (the name is a play on the phrase "thy will be done", spoken by Jesus Christ at the Garden of Gethsemane), was modeled, at least in clothing and appearance, on Will D. Campbell, a preacher, director of religious life at the University of Mississippi, civil rights activist (the only white man in the Southern Christian Leadership Conference) and author. Following Campbell's death in 2013, Marlette's son, Andy, honored Campbell with a final comic strip featuring Will B. Dunn, holding the Holy Bible at Campbell's grave.

== In other media ==
CBS aired a pilot for a Kudzu sitcom on August 13, 1983, but ended up airing as a TV special instead. Marlette collaborated with Bland Simpson and Jack Herrick of the Red Clay Ramblers on a musical comedy adaptation of the strip, Kudzu, A Southern Musical, which was produced in Washington, D.C., in 1998.
