= Tony DiGerolamo =

American comic writer

- Born: March 9, 1966 (age 60)
- Areas: Comic book writer, creator, publisher; screenwriter; improv performer

Tony DiGerolamo (born Anthony M. DiGerolamo on March 9, 1966) is a comic book writer, and screenwriter, and Colonel Sanders impersonator from New Jersey.

== Career ==
Tony DiGerolamo began his comics career in 1996 with the publication of his first comic book, "Jersey Devil #1", based on the Jersey Devil legend and several articles written in the South Jersey Courier-Post. It was published under his own imprint, South Jersey Rebellion Productions. Pencilled largely by Steven Cornicelli and inked by Bob Clark, "Jersey Devil #1" enjoyed modest sales. Replacing the art team, DiGerolamo recruited Dom LaGrutta, Jr. for the pencils and Donn Smith for the inks, giving "Jersey Devil #2" a cleaner look. Although the improvements continued to bring DiGerolamo and the SJRP strong local sales, comic fans largely ignored the comic. DiGerolamo's insistence on longer issues and multi-issue stories put a strain on his art team and forced him to recruit additional artists.

Around 1999, DiGerolamo launched what would become a more successful comic book, The Travelers, which was eventually picked up by Kenzer & Company at issue #4. With the changes of art teams, Jersey Devil was dropped by Diamond Distributors after issue #7 due to low sales. DiGerolamo struggled to keep the comic alive publishing issues 8 to 12 in mini-comic formats.

Now relieved of the financial burden of publication, DiGerolamo concentrated more on making The Travelers a success. The bimonthly schedule put a strain on artist Brian Dawson and the variety of inkers on the book, who included the Fraim Brothers. DiGerolamo also launched a four-issue mini-series called The Fix to coincide with a novel with the same character.

By issue 9, Dawson could no longer commit to The Travelers hectic schedule, so inker James Dunn took over the art chores for issues 10 and 11. Eventually, DiGerolamo found a new artist with Chris Moreno on the "Travelers #12". Sales peaked with The Travelers issue #14, which was a crossover with Knights of the Dinner Table Illustrated. Shortly thereafter, he took over the writing chores for another Kenzer comic called Everknights. DiGerolamo moved The Travelers to Wingnut Games with issue #21. By issue 22, Moreno could no longer keep doing the Travelers with his other comic work. DiGerolamo struggled with a series of other artists, with Moreno occasionally coming back to help with the art. The comic limped to the 25th issue before Wingnut had to cancel it.

By this time, DiGerolamo had landed side work with Bongo Comics writing for the Bart Simpson comics. His first story was a Lisa story entitled "A Chair of One's Own" in November 2002. While he continued to write for Bongo, he met the publishers at Silent Devil. Looking for another project that both he and Moreno could work on, the duo launched the Super Frat webcomic under Silent Devil's banner. In 2006, Silent Devil published its first compilation of Super Frat called "Super Frat: Rush Week Collection".

DiGerolamo continues to write screenplays and comic books in New Jersey. He is also the creator of "Complete Mafia" for d20 from Living Room Games and worked on an online zombie TV show called Zombie Country. DiGerolamo currently works with Christian Beranek on a webcomic hub called The Webcomic Factory.

In March 2023, DiGerolamo was part of the Ocean City Comic Book and Memorabilia Festival.

== Books ==
- The Wildsidhe Chronicles: Book 5: The Undercover Dragon 2003, Published by Padwolf Publishing. ISBN 1-890096-17-2 (author)
- The Fix: Fix In Overtime 2001, Published by Padwolf Publishing. ISBN 1-890096-09-1 (author)
- The Ralph Wiggum Book 2006, Published by Bongo. ISBN 0060748206 (contributing writer)
- F*ck You I'm Italian: Why We Italians Are Awesome 2018, Published by Ulysses Press. ISBN 1612437826 (writer)
- Wokeistan: A Novel 2019, Published by South Jersey Rebellion Productions. ASIN: B07TTWJ8WD (co-writer)
- The Pineys: Book 1: My Cousin, The Piney 2019, Published by South Jersey Rebellion Productions. ASIN: B07XVCWVCK (writer)

== D20 game books ==
- Tony Digerolamo's Complete Mafia for d20 2005, Published by Living Room Games. ISBN 0-9755206-1-X (creator)
- Lethal Legacies Traps of the World Before 2006, Published by Goodman Games. ISBN 0976314290 (writer)
- Tony Digerolamo's Complete Mafia for d20 West Coast Edition 2008, Published by The Le Games. (creator)

== Filmography ==
- Allergic to Cats 2016 (writer)
- Mafioso: The Father, The Son 2004 (writer)
- 10 Cents a Minute 2001 (writer)
- The Evil Within 1998 (written by)
- Life with the Dice Bag 2004 (Actor: Self)
