= Katja Tukiainen =

Finnish visual artist and painter (born 1969)

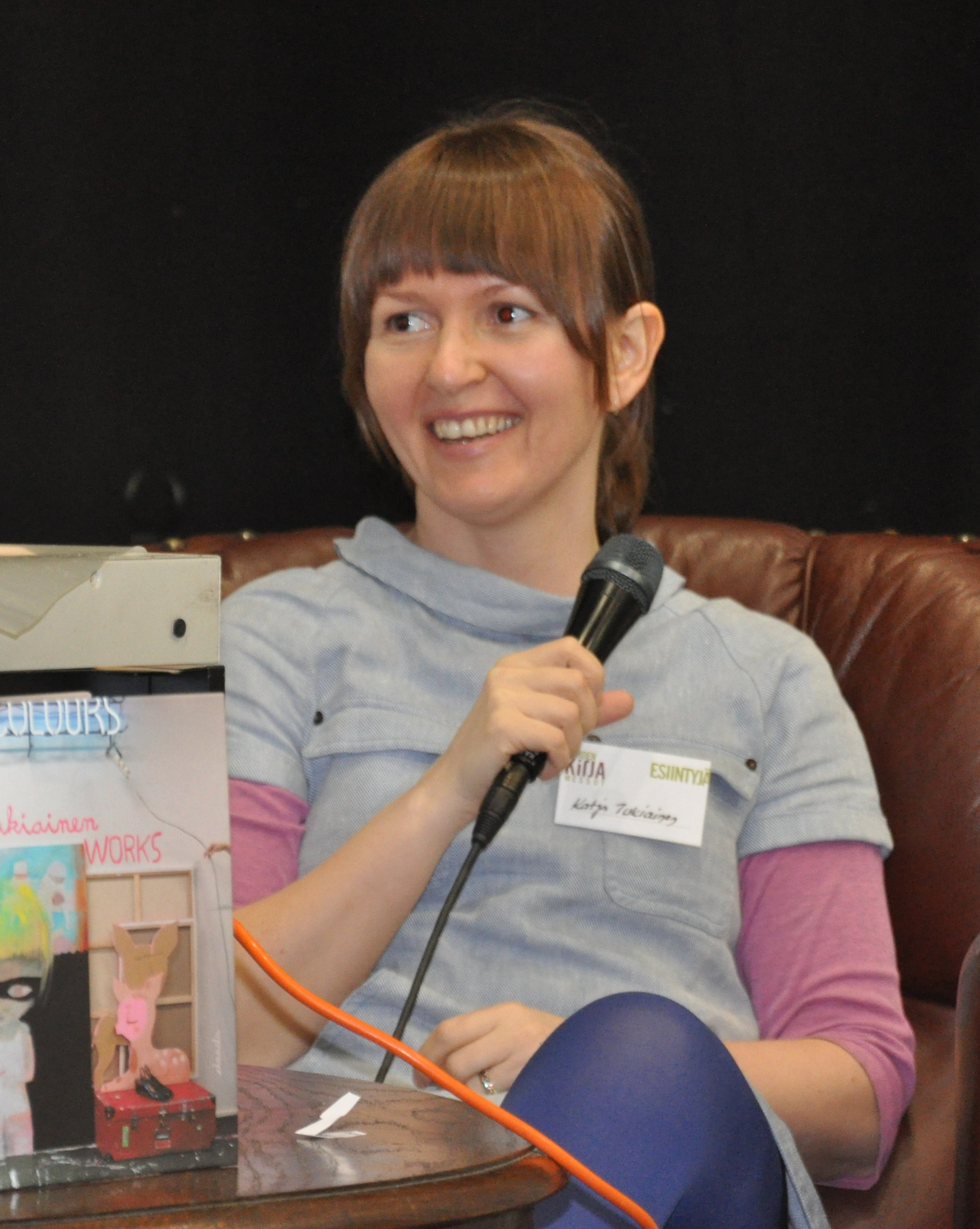
Katja Tukiainen (2009)

Katja Maarit Tukiainen (born 1969) is a Finnish visual artist, painter and comic artist. She was the regional artist of Uusimaa from 1999 to 2001 and the 2003 winner of the Finnish Comic Society's annual Puupää Award. She received the Finnish State Prize for Design in 2007, and the William Thuring Prize of the Finnish Art Society in 2011.

Tukiainen works with site-specific narration. She changes her medium according to what best suits the content of her artwork: paintings, comics, drawings, animation and sculptures. Her works are recognizable by their joyful colours (especially pink and magenta), sympathetic figures, and expressive style, and can deal with themes of daily politics, sorrow, or longing as well as dreams, love, and peace.

Tukiainen holds a Master's of Art degree from the University of Art and Design Helsinki and a Master's of Fine Arts degree from the Academy of Fine Arts (Finland), and has studied painting in the Academy of Fine Arts of Venice, Italy. After graduating, she worked for six months in Mazzano Romano, Italy, and has travelled to India on ten occasions to work for Dalit human rights.

Katja Tukiainen's paintings have been purchased into various prestigious collections in Finland and her comics have been published in several international anthologies. She is married to her colleague, Matti Hagelberg, and they have one child.

== Publications ==
Artist monographs:

- KATJA TUKIAINEN WORKS PART TWO ( 2008 - 2013, articles: Riiko Sakkinen, Katja Tukiainen, Raul Zamudio, languages: English and Finnish, 216 pages, Parvs Publishing 2013)
- KATJA TUKIAINEN WORKS ( 1999 - 2007, articles: Timo Valjakka, languages: English, France and Finnish, 112 pages, Daada kustannus 2007)
