= Triple Take =

American comic strip by Todd Clark and Scott Nickel

Scott Nickel and Todd Clark's Triple Take (January 11, 2007)

Triple Take is an American comic strip by Todd Clark and Scott Nickel that featured three separate punch lines in each daily installment. The strip was syndicated by King Features Syndicate and ran from April 4, 2005, to August 26, 2007. Clark provided the majority of the writing with Nickel drawing the strip and contributing gags.

== Triple punchlines ==
At its peak, Triple Take was syndicated to 40 newspapers. When it ended, the strip was appearing in 29 papers. The idea for Triple Take came from the late Jay Kennedy, comics editor at King Features, who developed the strip with Nickel and Clark. In 2005 press release, Kennedy commented, "What separates Triple Take from other comic features is that it delivers three different punchlines in one strip. Ask any cartoonist who has labored all day on one punch line and they will tell you how difficult it is to create three ideas for one gag. It takes true talent. This is a business where your talent will get you far. You don’t need to 'know someone' or have 'a connection'. If you have the talent, you’re made. These men (Clark and Nickel) have the talent." Kennedy died in a drowning accident in March 2007 at the age of 50.

In the same press release, Nickel noted, "We get three chances to make the reader laugh. If we’re successful at least two out of three times, we have a better batting average than most major-league baseball players. And we do it without steroids! Everything is fair game. Pop culture, history, everyday life… we pull inspiration from everywhere. And with no regular cast of characters, the range of subjects can span anywhere from aliens to pirates or even alien pirates!"
