= Ward of the State =

2007 comic book limited series published by Shadowline

- Cover of the first issue

Publication information
- Publisher: Image Comics
- Schedule: Mini-series
- Publication date: May–July 2007
- No. of issues: 3

Creative team
- Created by: Christopher Long
- Written by: Christopher Long
- Artist(s): Chee
- Colorist(s): Joel Seguin

Ward of the State is a three-issue comic book limited series published by Shadowline comics, a division of Image Comics.

== Plot ==
Dravis, Carrie, Clifton, Harkin, and Devon have been left in the Foster care of Ms. Balitzer, a foster mother with a secret. She has been training the children to be assassins. When one of their own dies, they must find who the killer is before they are all dead.
