= Guy Delisle =

Cartoonist, animator and comic book author

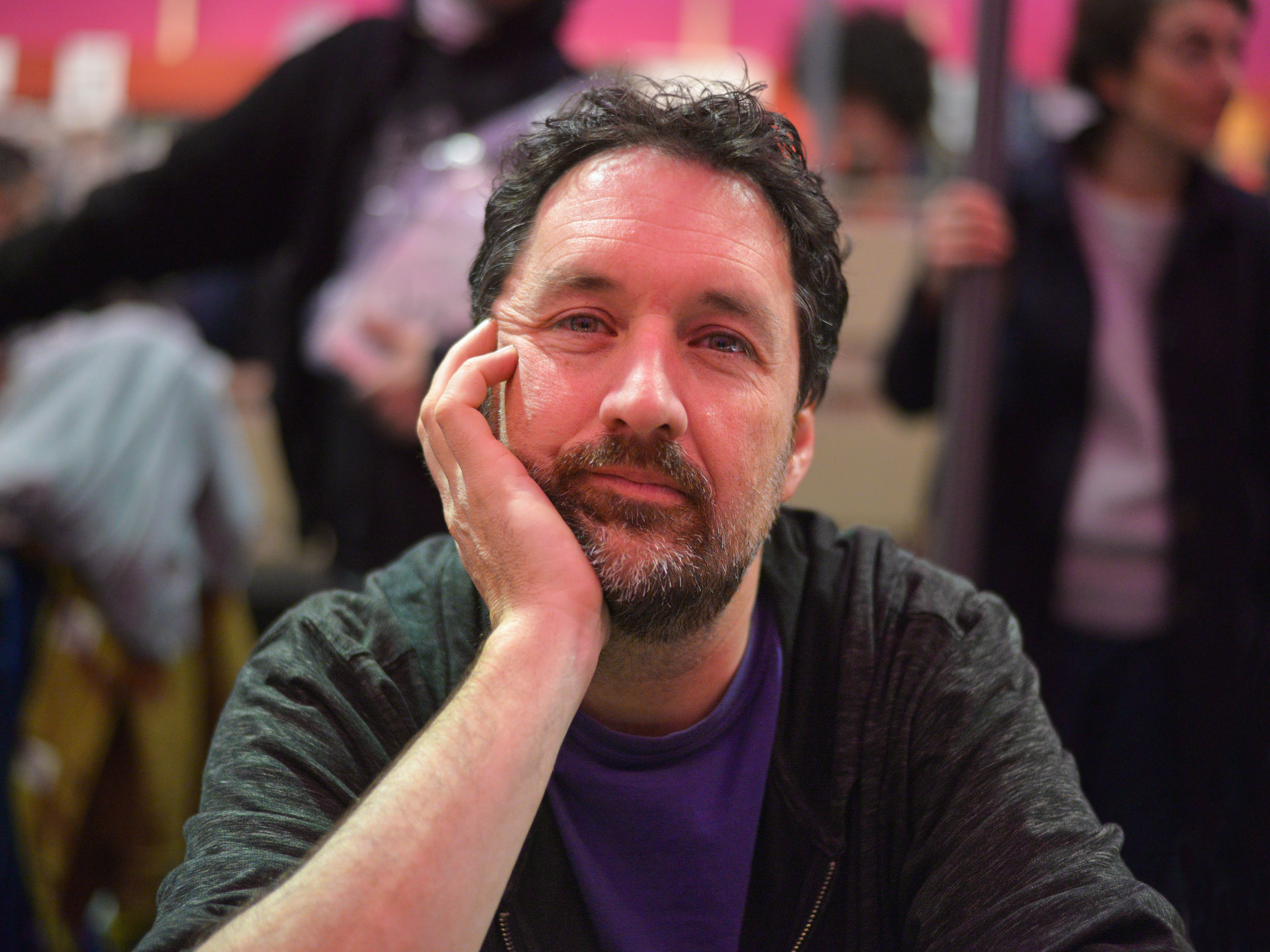
- Delisle at the 2015 Angoulême International Comics Festival
- Born: January 19, 1966 (age 60) Quebec City, Quebec, Canada
- Area: Cartoonist
- Notable works: Shenzhen: A Travelogue from China; Pyongyang: A Journey in North Korea; Burma Chronicles; Jerusalem: Chronicles from the Holy City

Guy Delisle (/ɡi dəlil/, born January 19, 1966) is a Canadian cartoonist and animator, best known for his graphic novels about his travels, such as Shenzhen: A Travelogue from China (2000), Pyongyang: A Journey in North Korea (2003), Burma Chronicles (2007), and Jerusalem: Chronicles from the Holy City (2012).

== Biography ==
Delisle studied animation at Sheridan College in Oakville, near Toronto, and then worked for the animation studio CinéGroupe in Montreal. He later worked for different studios in Canada, Germany, France, China and North Korea.

His experiences as a supervisor of animation work by studios in Asia were recounted in two graphic novels, Shenzhen: A Travelogue from China (2000) and Pyongyang: A Journey in North Korea (2003). The two books, Delisle's most famous work, were first published in French by the independent bande dessinée publisher L'Association. They have been translated into many languages, including Burmese, Croatian, Czech, English, Finnish, German, Italian, Polish, Portuguese and Spanish. A film version of Pyongyang starring Steve Carell was cancelled in December 2014 after the Sony Pictures Entertainment hack.

Delisle is married to a Médecins Sans Frontières (Doctors Without Borders) administrator. With her, he made a trip to Myanmar (Burma) in 2005, which is recounted in Chroniques Birmanes (2007), translated into English as Burma Chronicles.

In the summer of 2009, they completed a one-year stay in Beit Hanina, Jerusalem, again with Médecins Sans Frontières. This stay was recounted in Chroniques de Jerusalem (2011) which won the Angoulême International Comics Festival Prize for Best Album in 2012. Amongst other things it covered the Gaza War. In France, Chroniques de Jerusalem (English title: Jerusalem: Chronicles from the Holy City) was a best-seller.

In 2016, Delisle published S'enfuir. Récit d'un otage (Dargaud), translated into English as Hostage and published by Drawn & Quarterly in 2017. The graphic novel depicts the true story of Christophe André, a Médecins Sans Frontières administrator who was kidnapped in the Caucasus Region in 1997. Hostage was longlisted for Brooklyn Public Library's 2017 literary prize.

Delisle resides in Montpellier, France.

== Bibliography ==
=== French language ===
- Réflexion (L'Association, paperback, October 1996, ISBN 978-2909020723)
- Aline et les autres (L'Association, paperback, April 1999, ISBN 978-2844140159)
- Shenzhen (L'Association, paperback, April 2000, ISBN 978-2844140357)
- Inspecteur Moroni 1 : Premiers pas (Dargaud, paperback, March 2001, ISBN 978-2205050813)
- Albert et les autres (L'Association, paperback, June 2001, ISBN 978-2844140746)
- Inspecteur Moroni 2 : Avec ou sans sucre (Dargaud, paperback, April 2002, ISBN 978-2205052565)
- Comment ne rien faire (La Pastèque, paperback, August 2002, ISBN 978-2922585094; hardcover, November 2007, ISBN 978-2922585490)
- Pyongyang (L'Association, paperback, June 2003, ISBN 978-2844141132)
- Inspecteur Moroni 3 : Le Syndrome de Stockholm (Dargaud, paperback, July 2004, ISBN 978-2205055511)
- Louis au ski (Delcourt, paperback, November 2005, ISBN 978-2847899702)
- L'Association en Inde (L'Association, paperback, March 2007, ISBN 978-2844141958, with Frederik Peeters, Thiriet, Katja Tukiainen, and Matti Hagelberg)
- Chroniques birmanes (Delcourt, paperback, November 2007, ISBN 978-2756009339)
- Louis à la plage (Delcourt, paperback, August 2008, ISBN 978-2756014586)
- La maison close (Delcourt, paperback, January 2010, ISBN 978-2756021348, with Jérôme Mulot, Florent Ruppert, et al.)
- Chroniques de Jérusalem (Delcourt, paperback, November 2011, ISBN 978-2756025698)
- Le guide du mauvais père tome 1 (Delcourt, paperback, January 2013, ISBN 978-2756038735)
- Le guide du mauvais père tome 2 (Delcourt, paperback, January 2014, ISBN 978-2756047775)
- Papier 4 (Delcourt, paperback, September 2014, ISBN 978-2756053103, with Lewis Trondheim, Grégory Panaccione, et al.)
- Le guide du mauvais père tome 3 (Delcourt, paperback, January 2015, ISBN 978-2756066479)
- Croquis de Québec (Pow Pow, paperback, August 2016, ISBN 978-2924049136)
- S'enfuir. Récit d'un otage (Dargaud, paperback, September 2016, ISBN 978-2205075472)
- Le guide du mauvais père tome 4 (Delcourt, paperback, June 2018, ISBN 978-2413002802)
- Chroniques de jeunesse (Delcourt, paperback, January 2021, ISBN 978-2413039310)
- Pour une fraction de seconde: La Vie mouvementée d'Eadweard Muybridge (Delcourt, paperback, October 2024, ISBN 978-2413085850)

=== English language translations ===
- Pyongyang: A Journey in North Korea (Drawn & Quarterly, hardcover, September 2005, ISBN 978-1896597898; paperback, May 2007, ISBN 978-1897299210)
- Shenzhen: A Travelogue from China (Drawn & Quarterly, hardcover, October 2006, ISBN 978-1894937795; paperback, April 2012, ISBN 978-1770460799)
- Aline and the Others (Drawn & Quarterly, paperback, November 2006, ISBN 978-1897299128)
- Albert and the Others (Drawn & Quarterly, paperback, November 2007, ISBN 978-1897299272)
- Burma Chronicles (Drawn & Quarterly, hardcover, September 2008, ISBN 978-1897299500; paperback, September 2010, ISBN 978-1770460256)
- Jerusalem: Chronicles from the Holy City (Drawn & Quarterly, hardcover, April 2012, ISBN 978-1770460713; paperback, March 2015, ISBN 978-1770461765)
- A User's Guide to Neglectful Parenting (Drawn & Quarterly, paperback, June 2013, ISBN 978-1770461178)
- Even More Bad Parenting Advice (Drawn & Quarterly, paperback, August 2014, ISBN 978-1770461673)
- The Owner's Manual to Terrible Parenting (Drawn & Quarterly, paperback, October 2015, ISBN 978-1770462144)
- Hostage (Drawn & Quarterly, hardcover, April 2017, ISBN 978-1770462793)
- The Handbook to Lazy Parenting (Drawn & Quarterly, paperback, October 2019, ISBN 978-1770463646)
- Factory Summers (Drawn & Quarterly, hardcover, June 2021, ISBN 978-1770464599)
- World Record Holders (Drawn & Quarterly, paperback, August 2022, ISBN 978-1770465671)
- Muybridge: In a Fraction of a Second (Drawn & Quarterly, hardcover, April 2025, ISBN 978-1770467729)
