= Matti Hagelberg =

Finnish cartoonist (born 1964)

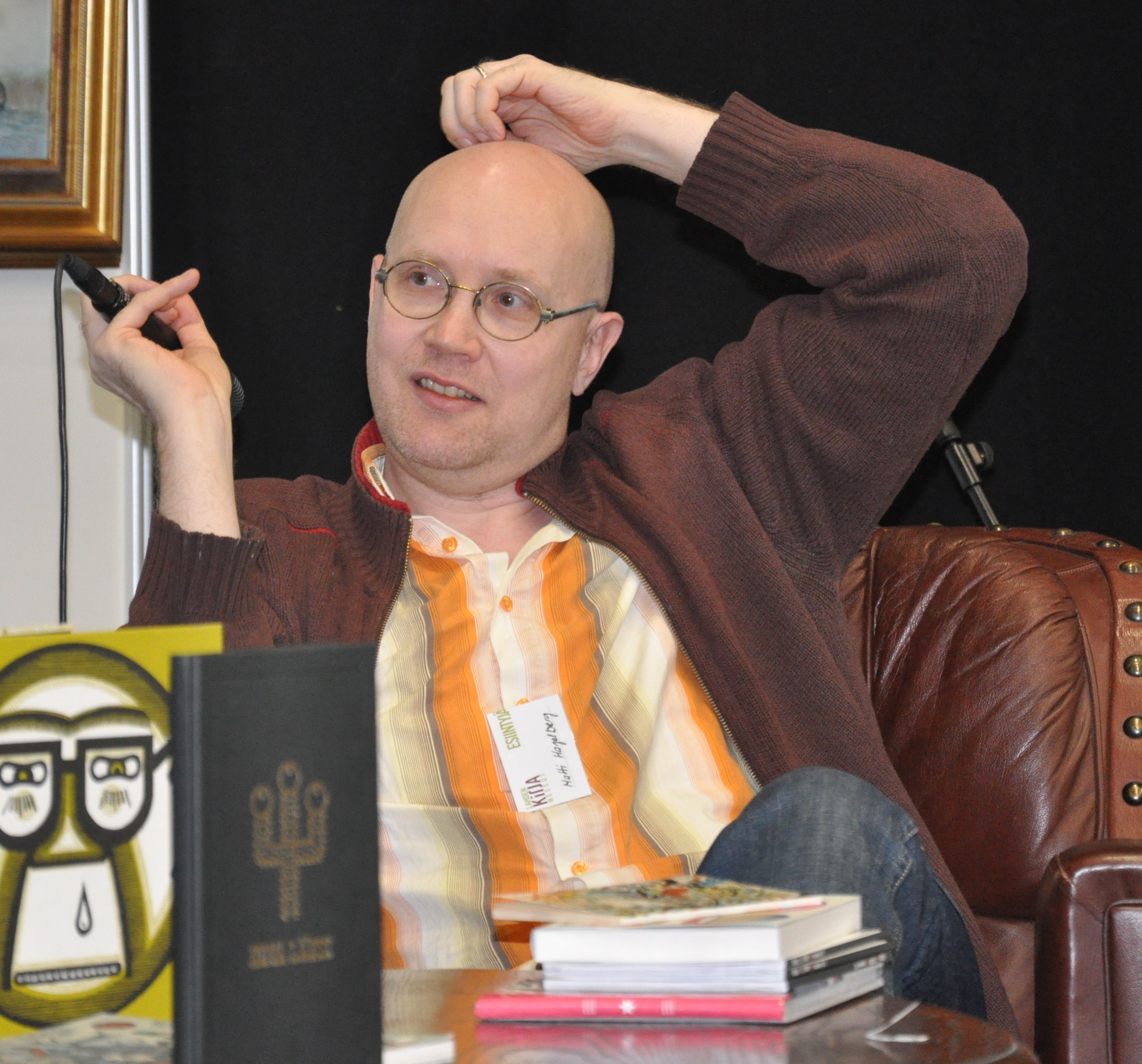
Matti Hagelberg (2009)

Matti Hagelberg (born 1964 Kirkkonummi) is a Finnish comic book artist, illustrator, graphical designer and teacher.

== Education and Career ==
He attended the University of Art and Design in Helsinki and achieved a Master of Arts degree. Hagelberg is the only famous Finnish author to use scratch cardboard as his medium and has won a Puupää hat award of the Finnish Comic Society in 1997.

He is married to Katja Tukiainen with one child.

Hagelberg's comics are humorous and discursive. He combines mythology and popular culture with fantastic and autobiographical elements in a liberal way. It is also common for Hagelberg to use a heroic character named directly after himself

His latest work is One way to make time more easy passing, a 1000-page comic book.

== Excerpts from bibliography ==
- B.E.M. -series, issues 1 - 19. For example, Bonuskaupungin vitsaukset, Venuksen Sulttaani, Tikapuuhermosto, Holmenkollen and Kekkonen. (1992–2012)

== Exhibits ==
- Le Mauvais oeil sur (Strasbourg, Angoulême, Marseille) 1997
- BIG Torino, biennale arte emergente 2000
- Un Regarde Moderne -gallery in Paris 2000
- The Finnish Culture Institute of Tallinn 2000

== Awards ==
- Best of year 1993 - special prize and commendation for best use of paper medium
- Best of year 1995 - silver apex for B.E.M. 2
- Puupää hat award, 1997
