= Undertown (comics) =

American manga-inspired comic

- Author: Jim Pascoe
- Illustrator: Jake Myler
- Publisher: Tokyopop
- Original run: 2007
- Volumes: 2

Undertown is an American manga-inspired comic written by Jim Pascoe and illustrated by Jake Myler and published by Tokyopop. The manga was released by Tokyopop on August 14, 2007. The magazine, New York, offered an exclusive preview of Undertown on its online-only comics page. The manga gets syndicated in over 50 newspapers, including the Los Angeles Times, Denver Post, Vancouver Sun and Seattle Post-Intelligencer. It was dropped from Los Angeles Times Sunday pages on July 5, 2009.

== Plot ==
10-year-old Sama is a shy young boy who is something of a crybaby, as his father apparently constantly reminds him. Sama cries so often that the tears stain his cheeks, but he finds comfort in his teddy bear, Eddie.

Sama's father is hospitalized after a heart attack, and given only a month to live. A stranger at the hospital tells Sama that he can find a cure for his father, the Sugar Stone, a magical healing item, but it is located in the mysterious realm of Undertown. All Sama needs to do is crawl under his bed, close his eyes, and countdown from ten to one. When his father’s condition turns worse, Sama takes a chance and does as the stranger tells him. He wakes up in a strange place where anthropomorphized animals and insects do battle for the one thing that is most valuable in Undertown: sugar. Sama gets an even bigger surprise when his teddy bear, Eddie suddenly comes to life. With the help of a rabbit named B.W., a porcupine name Joey P.P., and a reticent penguin named Broom, Sama takes on The Cloud, the leader of the Insect Insurgents, to find the Sugar Stone. In a place called the Sand Sea, they find lizards who choose to fight alongside them but not join their group. But the mystery and secret histories swirl around the boy and his teddy bear, and before Sama can save his father, he’ll have to discover them.

== Characters ==
- Sama: A young boy at age ten who is lonely and has only one friend. His teddy bear Eddie is from somewhere where teddy bears are made and they can move and talk.
- Eddie: He is Sama's teddy bear and Sama's only friend. Eddie lost his memory when he was sent up to Sama's world, so now he wants to find the Teddy Bear Bell. In the first volume, he finds it, and it makes Eddie remember everything about his past, including what happened to the other Teddy bears.

== Reception ==
Mania.com's criticizes the manga for not developing the background, saying "characters interact so fleetingly with the cities, the deserts and the forests that Undertown feels like little more than a cardboard backdrop". Coolstreak Cartoons's Leroy Douresseaux commends the illustrator's use of toning in the manga making the art "highly detailed". Publishers Weekly states, "Undertown ’s real strength lies in how all these concepts are introduced with a breakneck pace and with grand strokes."
