= Beth Sotelo =

American comic book colorist

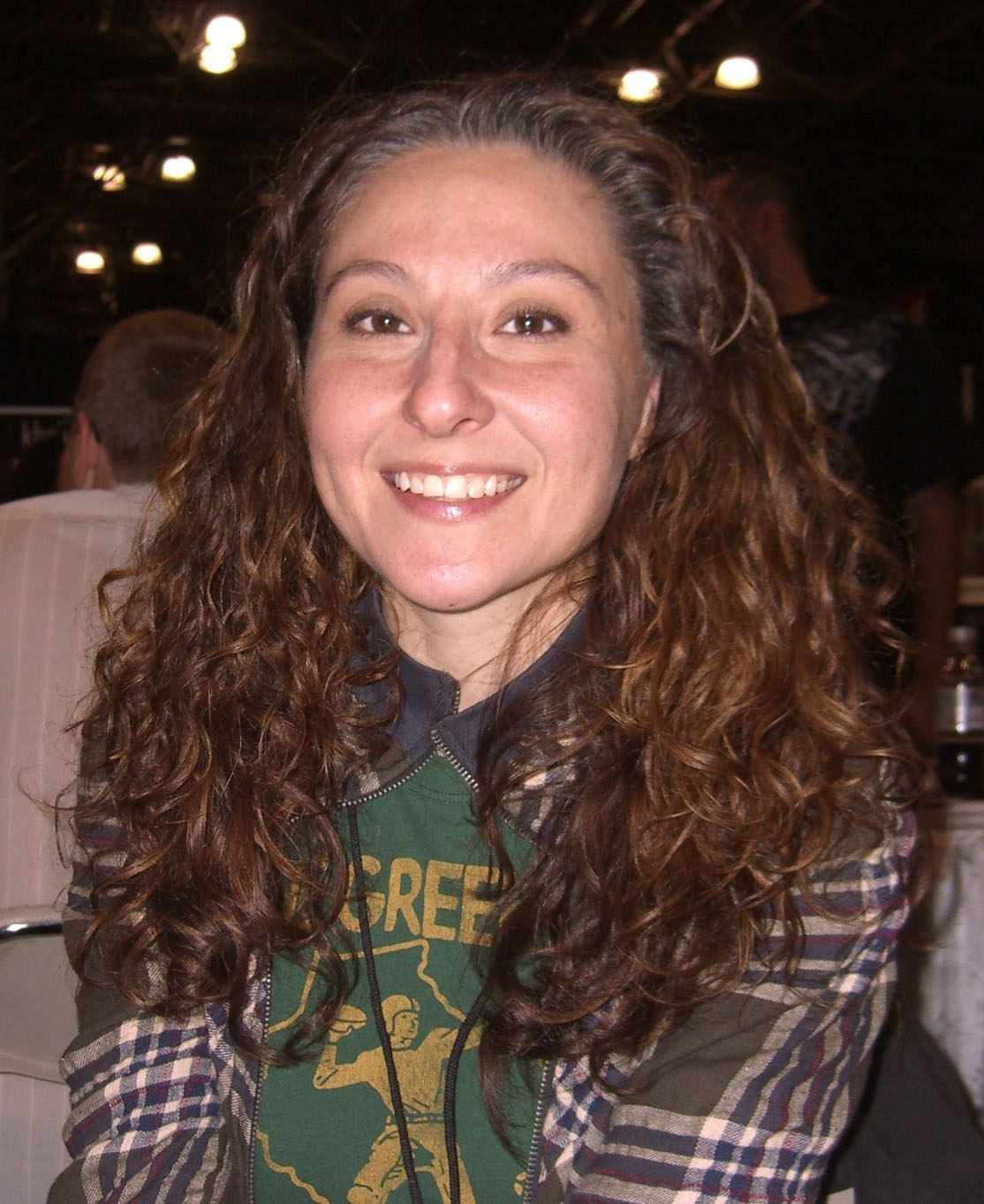
- Sotelo at the New York Comic Con in Manhattan, New York on October 10, 2010.
- Area: Colourist
- Notable works: Witchblade
- Spouse: Joel Gomez

Beth Sotelo is an American comic book colorist working with Aspen MLT. Having started at Top Cow Productions in 2001, she has since worked at both DC Comics and Marvel Comics, two of the largest American comic publishers.

== Early life ==
Sotelo grew up in Hesperia and San Gabriel, California. She began drawing at a young age, and took classes related to her interest in art whenever possible.

== Career ==
Sotelo began her career as a colorist for Top Cow Productions in 2001. She was mentored by Peter Steigerwald. She continued to work mostly for Aspen Comics, but also did work for Marvel Comics and DC Comics. Among her Marvel works is the 2008 comic book Wolverine: Killing Made Simple. She was the colorist on the All New Fathom and Shrugged comics series produced by Aspen MLT. She was also the colorist on Fathom volume 5 in 2016.

She was noted for her work on Brightest Day #0, on which Sotelo collaborated with fellow colorist Peter Stiegerwald. Doug Zawisza of Comic Book Resources noted their "solid coloring", saying that "the duo delivered consistency in this book -- but some of their color choices seemed murky and undefined, such as Firestorm's skin tone." Zawisza later praised the color in issue #18, saying, "All the same, the colors are played as a strength in this issue, even serving as a framing sequence." Her work on Soulfire #9 was called "electric" by David Pepose of Newsarama.

In 2013, she used Kickstarter to fund her comic, Grump. Sotelo had been working on the character and concept of Grump for about 7 years, and describes the character: "Grump is a 9 year old boy with a pinch of agoraphobia. He lives in a house that looks like it should be condemned. He has no friends. His adopted stray dog has gone missing. Now, Grump’s world is about to change. We'll watch him explore his own neighborhood for the first time."

Sotelo was one of the colorists on Catwoman in 2014. She was a colorist on Jason Coffee's Warhawks in 2014. She worked as a colorist on Batman/Superman in 2015. She was an artist on the 2016 one-shot Suicide Squad Most Wanted: El Diablo and Boomerang.

Sotelo appeared at the Long Beach Comic Con in September 2014. She was one of the special guests at the event "A League of Extraordinary Ladies" at Big Red Comics in Orange, California in February 2015. She was one of the industry personalities at the Middle East Film & Comic Con in Dubai in April 2016.

== Personal life ==
Sotelo is married to fellow artist Joel Gomez. They live in San Diego, California.

== Bibliography ==
=== Aspen ===
- Aspen Seasons: Spring 2005 #1 (2005)
- Aspen Showcase: Kiani (2009)
- Aspen Splash #1
- Fathom Prelude #1
- Fathom: Cannon Hawke Beginnings
- Fathom: Cannon Hawke #0-2,4,5
- Fathom: Cannon Hawke: Dawn of War #1
- Fathom: Cannon Hawke: Prelude #1
- Fathom: Killian's Tide #2-3
- Heroes #12-14
- Shrugged Preview
- Shrugged #0-5
- Shrugged Beginnings
- Soulfire #4-6
- Soulfire: Dying Of The Light #0-5
- Worlds of Aspen #1

=== DC Comics ===
- Action Comics #826
- Adventures of Superman #639
- Prelude to Infinite Crisis #1
- Supergirl #1-2
- Superman #216

=== Image Comics/Top Cow Productions ===
- Aphrodite IX #3-4
- Common Grounds #5
- EVO #1
- Fathom #1/2, 13
- The Magdalena V.2 #1-4
- Proximity Effect TPB
- Tomb Raider Journeys #9
- Witchblade #58, 62-64
- Witchblade and Tomb Raider #1
- Witchblade/Wolverine #1

=== Marvel Comics ===
- Loners #3-4
- New X-Men #154

=== Other ===
- Ant #4 (cover)
- Atomika #1-8
- Cici #1-2
- "The Revolution" - Heavy Metal Magazine (January 2002)
- Lucky Bamboo Presents #0
- "Lady Mechanika - The Clockwork Assassin" #1-2
