= Joel Gomez =

American comic book artist

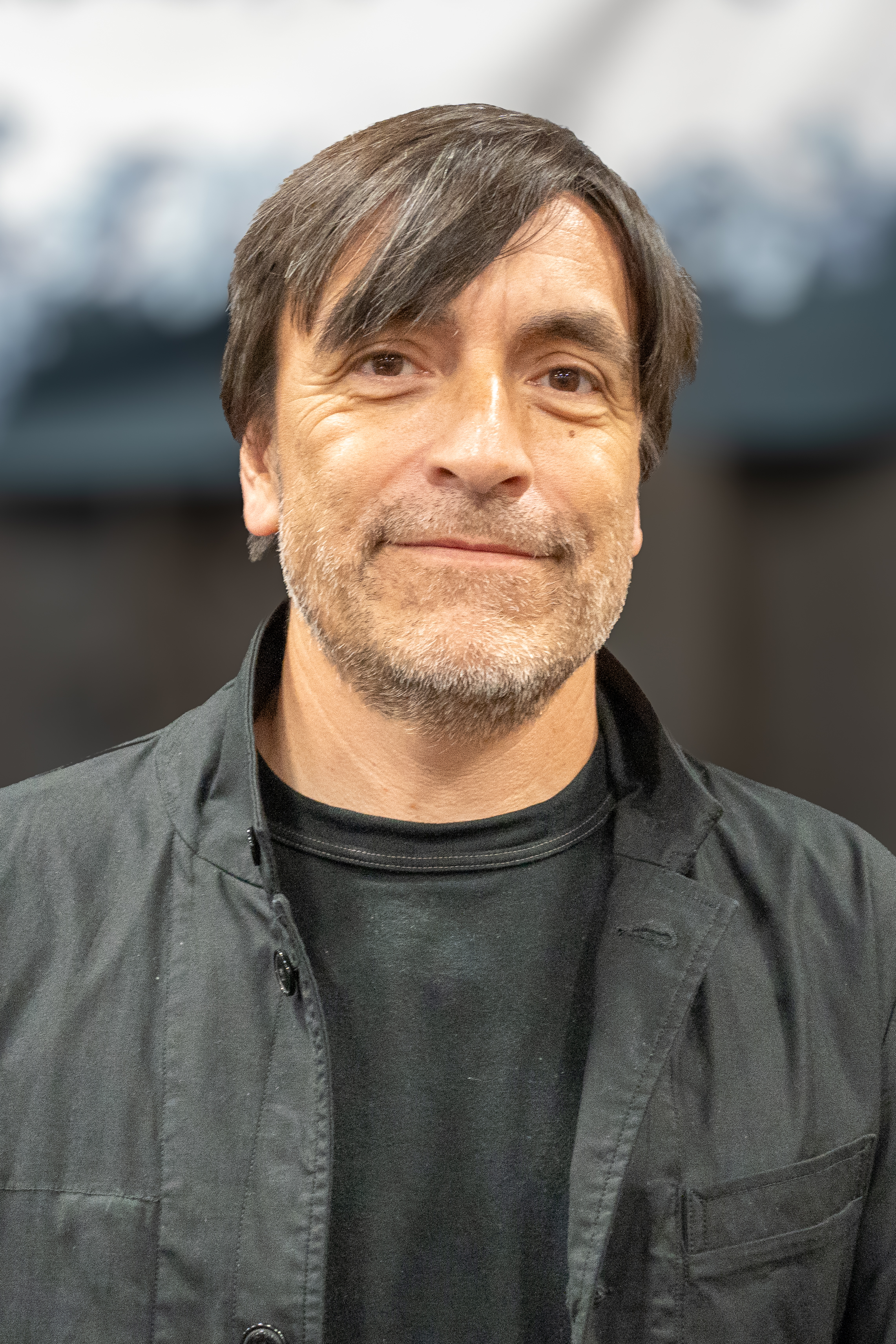
- Gomez at Comic Con Oakland 2026
- Area: Penciller
- Notable works: Lost Boys: Reign of Frogs
- Spouse: Beth Sotelo

Joel Gomez is an American comic book artist, known for his work on books such as WildStorm Productions' Lost Boys: Reign of Frogs.

== Career ==
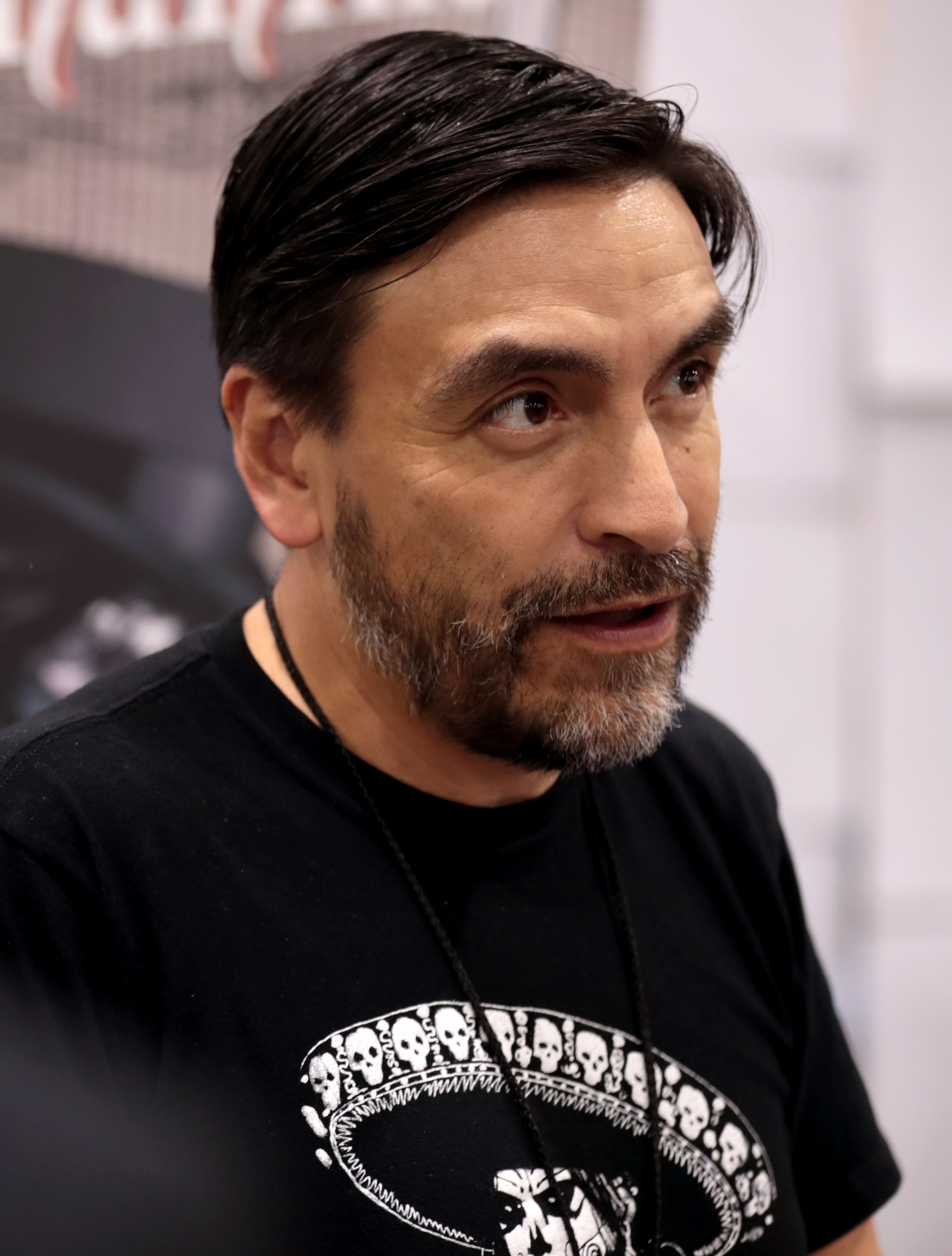
Gomez at the Phoenix Fan Fusion in May 2019

Gomez started his career at Top Cow, working on books such as Witchblade and The Darkness. After moving to San Diego, Gomez was hired by Wildstorm Productions for whom he now works.

== Personal life ==
Gomez is currently married to comic book colorist, Beth Sotelo. They live in San Diego, California.

== Bibliography ==
Comics work includes:

- Darkness #37 (Top Cow, February 2001)
- Witchblade/Lady Death #1 (with David Wohl, Top Cow, November 2001)
- Witchblade #62-65,68-75 (Top Cow, March–July 2003, September 2003 - June 2004)
- Soulfire #6 (inks, with co-authors Jeffrey T. Krul/Michael Turner and pencils by Michael Turner, Aspen MLT, April 2006)
- A Nightmare on Elm Street #4-5 (Wildstorm, March–April 2007)
- Iron and the Maiden #0-4 (with Jason Rubin, Aspen, July–December, 2007)
- Wetworks #10-15 (with J.M. DeMatteis (#10-15) and Keith Giffen (#13-15), Wildstorm, August 2007 - January 2008)
- The Texas Chainsaw Massacre: About a Boy #1 (Wildstorm, September 2007)
- Iron and the Maiden: Brutes, Bims and the City #1 (Aspen, February 2008)
- Legion of Super-Heroes #39 (with Jim Shooter, DC, April 2008)
- Lost Boys: Reign of Frogs (with Hans Rodionoff, Wildstorm, 4-issue mini-series, May–August 2008)
- Gears of War #8 (with Joshua Ortega, Wildstorm, July 2009)
