= Gears of War (disambiguation) =

Gears of War is a science fiction video game series.

Gears of War may also refer to:

- Gears of War (video game), the first installment of the series
- Gears of War (comics), a comics series based on the series
- "Gears of War" (song), by Megadeth
- Other media named Gears of War
