= Aspen Comics =

American entertainment company

- Founded: 2003
- Founder: Michael Turner
- Country of origin: United States
- Headquarters location: Santa Monica, California
- Distribution: Diamond Book Distributors (books)
- Key people: Michael Turner
- Publication types: Comics
- Owner: Mythos Studios (50%)
- Official website: www.aspencomics.com

Aspen Comics (Aspen MLT Inc.) is a California entertainment company founded in 2003 by artist Michael Turner. It has locations in Santa Monica and Marina Del Rey. The company is best known for producing comic books and figurines.

== History ==
The company was founded by comic book artist Michael Turner in January 2003. The name "Aspen" comes from the main character in Turner's comic series, Fathom. Aspen Comics released the fantasy adventure Soulfire in 2004, its first ongoing series. 2005 marked the return of Fathom (originally published by Image Comics), with comic artist Koi Turnbull taking over the illustration of the title. Ekos, a collaboration between Turner and Geoff Johns was scheduled to follow shortly after Soulfire, but was still unreleased prior to Turner's death in 2008.

In 2001, Top Cow Productions announced a live-action Fathom feature film and supposedly entered into an agreement with James Cameron's Lightstorm Entertainment to co-produce the film.

== Staff ==
- Founder – Michael Turner
- Co-Owner – Peter Steigerwald
- Co-Owner/President – Frank Mastromauro
- Vice President/Design and Production – Mark Roslan
- Vice President/Editor in Chief – Vince Hernandez
- Marketing and Production Manager – Sara Hasson
- Office Manager – Megan Shirk

== Titles ==
- Artifact One
- Aspen
- Aspen Swimsuit: Splash
- Broken Pieces
- Bubblegun
- Charismagic
- Damsels in Excess
- Dellec
- Ekos
- Eternal Soulfire
- Executive Assistant Assassins
- Executive Assistant Iris
- Fathom
- Fathom Blue
- Fathom: Kiani
- Four Points, The
- Idolized
- Iron and the Maiden
- Homecoming
- Lady Mechanika
- Legend of the Shadow Clan
- Lola XOXO
- Mindfield
- Oniba: Swords of the Demon
- Overtaken
- Psycho Bonkers
- Portal Bound
- Santeria: The Goddess Kiss
- Shrugged
- Soulfire
- Trish Out of Water – a side story in the Fathom continuity, with different characters. A five-issue limited series written by Vince Hernandez, drawn by Giuseppe Cafaro, colored by Ruben Curto and Studio Parlapa and lettered by Josh Reed. Published in 2013–2014.
- The Zoo Hunters

== Collaborations ==
Aspen MLT has worked together with both DC Comics and Marvel Comics on major cross-company collaborations. The most well-known are DC's Superman: Godfall and Superman/Batman: Supergirl, where creators of Aspen MLT worked together with DC to create art and story for these comics. Following this, both DC and Marvel contracted Michael Turner to produce covers for their series.

=== Aspen/DC works ===
- Flash (covers)
- Identity Crisis (covers)
- Supergirl (variant covers – #1–5, interior colors #1–4)
- Superman: Godfall (covers and interior art)
- Superman/Batman: Supergirl (covers and interior art – #8–13)
- Superman/Batman #26 (covers)
- Teen Titans (variant cover – #1)
- Justice League of America (covers)

=== Aspen/Marvel works ===
- Black Panther (#23–25 – covers (Turner) and interiors (Turnbull))
- Civil War (variant covers – #1–7)
- Incredible Hulk (variant cover – #100)
- Hulk (variant covers 1, 6 & 7)
- Ms. Marvel (variant cover – #1)
- Onslaught: Reborn (variant cover – #1)
- Ultimate Wolverine (promo art, series never completed)
- Ultimate X-Men (variant cover – #75)
- Wolverine: Origins (variant cover – #1)
- Wolverine Wolverine #66 Old Man Logan

== Notable creators ==
- Talent Caldwell
- Jason Gorder
- Siya Oum
- Micah Gunnell
- Vince Hernandez
- Don Ho
- Geoff Johns
- J. T. Krul
- Jeph Loeb
- A. Mahadeo
- Frank Mastromauro
- David Morán
- Mark Roslan
- Beth Sotelo
- Peter Steigerwald
- Christina Strain
- Marcus To
- Koi Turnbull
- Michael Turner (founder)
