= Talent Caldwell =

American comic book artist

- Area: Penciller

Talent Caldwell is a comic book artist best known for his work on the Top Cow Productions character Fathom. He has also drawn for DC Comics' Superman and Marvel Comics' Spider-Man characters.

== Career ==
Talent Caldwell came to the attention of artist Michael Turner of Top Cow Productions and was signed to work with that comic book company. He made his professional debut drawing backgrounds on Turner's Fathom. Caldwell went on to draw the Fathom mini-series Killian's Tide.

When Turner and some other Top Cow employees broke off to form Aspen Comics, Talent joined them. After a lawsuit between Aspen and Top Cow, Talent's Fathom: Dawn of War miniseries, which he co-wrote and drew, was released in 2004. Talent then left Aspen and began doing freelance work for DC Comics and Marvel Comics. In the mid-2000s, he drew Wildstorm's Gen^{13} series.

== Bibliography ==
Promotional art by Caldwell for Wildcats: Nemesis #6

- Action Comics #812-813
- Adventures of Superman #625 - 626
- Aspen Sketchbook #1
- Fathom #11-14 (background assists]
- Fathom: Dawn of War #0-3
- Fathom: Dawn of War Beginnings #1
- Fathom: Killians Tide #1-4
- Gen^{13} vol. 4, #1-3, 5-6
- G.I. Joe: A Real American Hero: Cobra Reborn #1
- Spectacular Spider-Man vol. 2, #21-22
- Superman vol. 2, #202-203
- Tom Judge: End of Days Special (pinup)
- Wildcats: Nemesis (with Robbie Morrison, 9-issue limited series, Wildstorm, tpb, 208 pages, 2006, ISBN 1-4012-1105-4))
- "Wildcats: Armageddon" (with Christos Gage, Wildstorm, January 2008)
- X-Men: Age of Apocalypse (one-shot, Marvel)
