= Sand + Bone =

Graphic novel

- First edition
- Date: 17 April 2017
- Page count: 60 pages
- Publisher: Adaptive Comics

Creative team
- Creator: J.T. Krul, Andrea Mutti

Sand + Bone is a graphic novel by J.T. Krul and Andrea Mutti published in 2017. The book revolves around a soldier's return from Iraq and subsequent dealing with symptoms of PTSD.

== Plot summary ==
Sean Hitcher, a United States soldier, has recently returned home from Iraq due to being wounded in the Iraq War. Attempting to buy more pain medication at the pharmacy, he learns that his old love interest, Hannah, is the town's pharmacist. Hannah is unable to fill Sean's prescription until after he has met with the VA's psychiatrist. Sean leaves and buys alcohol instead.

On the way home, Sean is approached by a dog. Sean stands his ground and the dog backs down. The dog's owner then tries to sell drugs to Sean, who refuses. The drug dealer is angry at Sean, as he thinks Sean has done something to the dog, who is acting strange. Later, after Sean is home, he has a nightmare of being in a cave in Iraq when something bad happens; this is not communicated to the reader. The drug dealer goes to check on his dog and finds that it has been savagely killed.

Sean's life begins to spiral downward; he begins using drugs and having illicit sex in alleyways with random women. His nightmares have not gone away; he dreams of fangs. A visit from Hannah leads to her and Sean spending the day together. They go and watch her son playing soccer where her ex-husband, Eric, is also present. Later, at the bar, Sean turns down a woman he has previously been involved with. He is then attacked by, Eric, who thinks Sean is trying to rekindle his relationship with Hannah.

On Sean's walk home, he is attacked by the drug dealer in retaliation for his dog's death. Sean runs into the forest and is followed. Sean dispatches each of the drug dealer's friends in quick succession, leaving them for dead. Sean attempts to commit suicide at home, but cannot bring himself to pull the trigger. He goes to see Hannah at the pharmacy and tells her of the horrors of war while she drives to her house.

Sean and Hannah are attacked by Eric, who ties Sean to a chair. When Eric threatens Sean with a shotgun, Sean begins to transform into a werewolf. Sean kills Eric by ripping out his throat. Hannah leaves town afterwards, apparently keeping Sean's secret. A flashback shows that Sean found writings on a cave wall in Iraq and was attacked by a werewolf. In the present, Sean wakes up and looks out of the window and it is revealed that he has reenlisted and has returned to Iraq.

== Style ==
The book has been described as gritty. Mutti uses a blocky style which is perfect for the chiseled face of Hitcher. During more action-paced scenes, Mutti begins to imitate charcoal drawings with dark shades and harsh lines.

== Analysis ==
In an interview, J.T. Krul wanted to emphasize the lack of a support system for veterans suffering from PTSD. An underlying theme throughout the book is how people with good intentions cannot understand the experiences of war. Krul goes on to say that this book is for entertainment, but that it is also meant to shed some light on the struggles of veterans and how they are being failed. The transformation into a werewolf at the end of the book happens suddenly. While it is clear that there have been killings, it is unclear if the reader is to take the transformation literally.

== Reception ==
PopMatters gave the book a rating of 7 out of 10 and said "the brevity of the book is both a strength and a weakness". PopMatters goes on to say that there is more filler than necessary. The dialogue has been described as clunky, especially Hannah's exposition. The artwork is said to be some of Mutti's best.
