= List of Gears of War media =

Gears of War is a video game franchise that debuted on November 9, 2006 with Gears of War for the Xbox 360 and was a best-seller. The fictional universe of the series takes place on the fictional planet Sera and focus on a war between humans and creatures known as Locust. The franchise has since spawned several novels, art books, a series of comic books, and a board game by Fantasy Flight Games, with a film currently in pre-production.

== Video games ==
Game	Details
Gears of War Original release date(s): NA: November 9, 2006; EU: November 12, 2006; AU: November 24, 2006	Release years by system: 2006—Xbox 360; 2007—Microsoft Windows
Gears of War Original release date(s): NA: November 9, 2006; EU: November 12, 2006; AU: November 24, 2006	Notes: A Limited Collector's Edition was released in a steel case with an additional disc with environment and stages artwork and a book titled Destroyed Beauty.
Gears of War 2 Original release date(s): WW: November 7, 2008	Release years by system: 2008—Xbox 360
Gears of War 2 Original release date(s): WW: November 7, 2008	Notes: A Limited Edition version was released featuring a SteelBook case, bonus content DVD, a book titled Beneath the Surface: An Inside Look at Gears of War 2, and exclusive Xbox Live downloadable content.; Expansions: "All Fronts Collection" (2009)
Gears of War 3 Original release date(s): WW: September 20, 2011	Release years by system: 2011—Xbox 360
Gears of War 3 Original release date(s): WW: September 20, 2011	Notes: A Limited Edition version was released featuring a SteelBook case.; Expansions: "RAAM's Shadow" (2011); "Horde Command Pack" (2011); "Versus Booster Map Pack" (2011); "Forces of Nature Map Pack" (2012); "Fenix Rising" (2012)
Gears of War: Judgment Original release date(s): NA: March 19, 2013; AU: March 19, 2013; EU: March 22, 2013	Release years by system: 2013—Xbox 360
Gears of War: Judgment Original release date(s): NA: March 19, 2013; AU: March 19, 2013; EU: March 22, 2013	Notes: It serves as a prequel of the first game.; Epic Games co-developed the game with Polish studio People Can Fly.; Expansions: "Call to Arms" (2013); "Lost Relics" (2013); "Dreadnought" (2013); "Haven" (2013)
Gears of War: Ultimate Edition Original release date(s): NA: August 25, 2015; AU: August 25, 2015; EU: August 28, 2015	Release years by system: 2015—Xbox One; 2016—Microsoft Windows
Gears of War: Ultimate Edition Original release date(s): NA: August 25, 2015; AU: August 25, 2015; EU: August 28, 2015	Notes: A remaster game of the original Gears of War.; The first game in the series not developed by Epic Games. The Coalition led the game's development.
Gears of War 4 Original release date(s): WW: October 11, 2016	Release years by system: 2016—Xbox One; 2016—Microsoft Windows
Gears of War 4 Original release date(s): WW: October 11, 2016	Notes: Set 25 years after Gears of War 3 and the single-player campaign focuses on the story of Marcus Fenix's son, J.D. and his friends Kait Diaz and Del Walker.; The first main entry in the series to be developed by The Coalition
Gears Pop! Original release date(s): WW: August 22, 2019	Release years by system: 2019—iOS; 2019—Android; 2019—Microsoft Windows
Gears Pop! Original release date(s): WW: August 22, 2019	Notes: Mobile real-time strategy video game in which two players battle using Funko Pop!-stylized characters from the Gears fictional universe, with gameplay similar to Clash Royale.; Mediatonic led the game's development.
Gears 5 Original release date(s): WW: September 10, 2019	Release years by system: 2019—Xbox One; 2019—Microsoft Windows; 2020—Xbox Series X and Series S
Gears 5 Original release date(s): WW: September 10, 2019	Notes: Direct sequel to Gears of War 4 with Kait Diaz as the central protagonist, while J.D. Fenix is playable in the first chapter of the campaign; Gears 5 will receive visual enhancements for the Xbox Series X upon its launch, including higher resolution textures, new visual effects such as volumetric fog, and running at higher frames per second; A Limited Edition version was released, which includes the Ultimate Edition of the game, a Limited Edition Xbox One X console, controller, headset, wireless keyboard, mouse from Razer, external hard drives from Seagate, Gears of War: Ultimate Edition, and the standard versions of Gears of War 2, Gears of War 3, and Gears of War 4; Expansions: "Hivebusters" (2020)
Gears Tactics Original release date(s): WW: April 28, 2020	Release years by system: 2020—Xbox One; 2020—Microsoft Windows; 2020—Xbox Series X and Series S
Gears Tactics Original release date(s): WW: April 28, 2020	Notes: A spin-off title with gameplay similar to the X-COM series, and serves as a prequel of the first game.; Set one year after Emergence Day and 13 years before Gears of War and focuses on Kait Diaz's father, Gabriel Diaz.

== Printed ==
Title	Release date	ISBN	Media type
Destroyed Beauty	November 9, 2006	—	Supplementary book
Released with the Gears of War Limited Collector's Edition package
Beneath the Surface: An Inside Look at Gears of War 2	November 7, 2008	—	Supplementary book
Released with the Gears of War 2 Limited Edition package
Gears of War	December 2008 – August 2012	—	Comic book series
Written by Joshua Ortega with art by Liam Sharp
Gears of War: Aspho Fields	October 28, 2008	ISBN 978-0-345-49943-1	Novelization
Written by Karen Traviss; First novel in an expected book series and is considered canon material
Gears of War: Jacinto's Remnant	July 28, 2009	ISBN 978-0-345-49944-8	Novelization
Written by Karen Traviss; Second novel in an expected book series and is considered canon material
Gears of War: Anvil Gate	August 31, 2010	ISBN 978-0-345-49945-5	Novelization
Written by Karen Traviss; Third novel in an expected book series and is considered canon material
Gears of War: Coalition's End	August 2, 2011	ISBN 978-1-4391-8395-3	Novelization
Written by Karen Traviss; Fourth novel in an expected book series and is considered canon material
Gears of War: The Slab	May 8, 2012	ISBN 978-1-4391-8407-3	Novelization
Written by Karen Traviss; Fifth novel in an expected book series and is considered canon material
Gears of War: Rise of RAAM	January 2018 - April 2018	ISBN 978-1-6840-5238-7	Comic book series
Written by Kurtis J. Wiebe with art by Max Dunbar
Gears of War: Hivebusters	May 2019 - March 2020	ISBN 978-1-6840-5417-6	Comic book series
Written by Kurtis J. Wiebe with art by Alan Quah
Gears of War: Ascendance	July 30, 2019	ISBN 978-1-7890-9261-5	Novelization
Written by Jason M. Hough
Gears of War: Bloodlines	April 21, 2020	ISBN 978-1-7890-9478-7	Novelization
Written by Jason M. Hough
Gears of War: Ephyra Rising	November 16, 2021	ISBN 978-1-7890-9580-7	Novelization
Written by Michael A. Stackpole

== Other media ==
Title	Release date	Media type
Gears of War: The Board Game	2011	Board game
Notes: A board game released by Fantasy Flight Games and designed by Corey Konieczka.
Gears of War	TBA	Film
Notes: Rights to the film were purchased by New Line Cinema, with Stuart Beattie writing the script along with Marty Bowen and Wyck Godfrey, who will be producing it.

== Soundtracks ==
Title	Release date	Length	Label	Ref
Gears of War: The Soundtrack	July 31, 2007	69:08	Sumthing Else	
Gears of War 2: The Soundtrack	November 25, 2008	62:27	Sumthing Else	
