= Micah Gunnell =

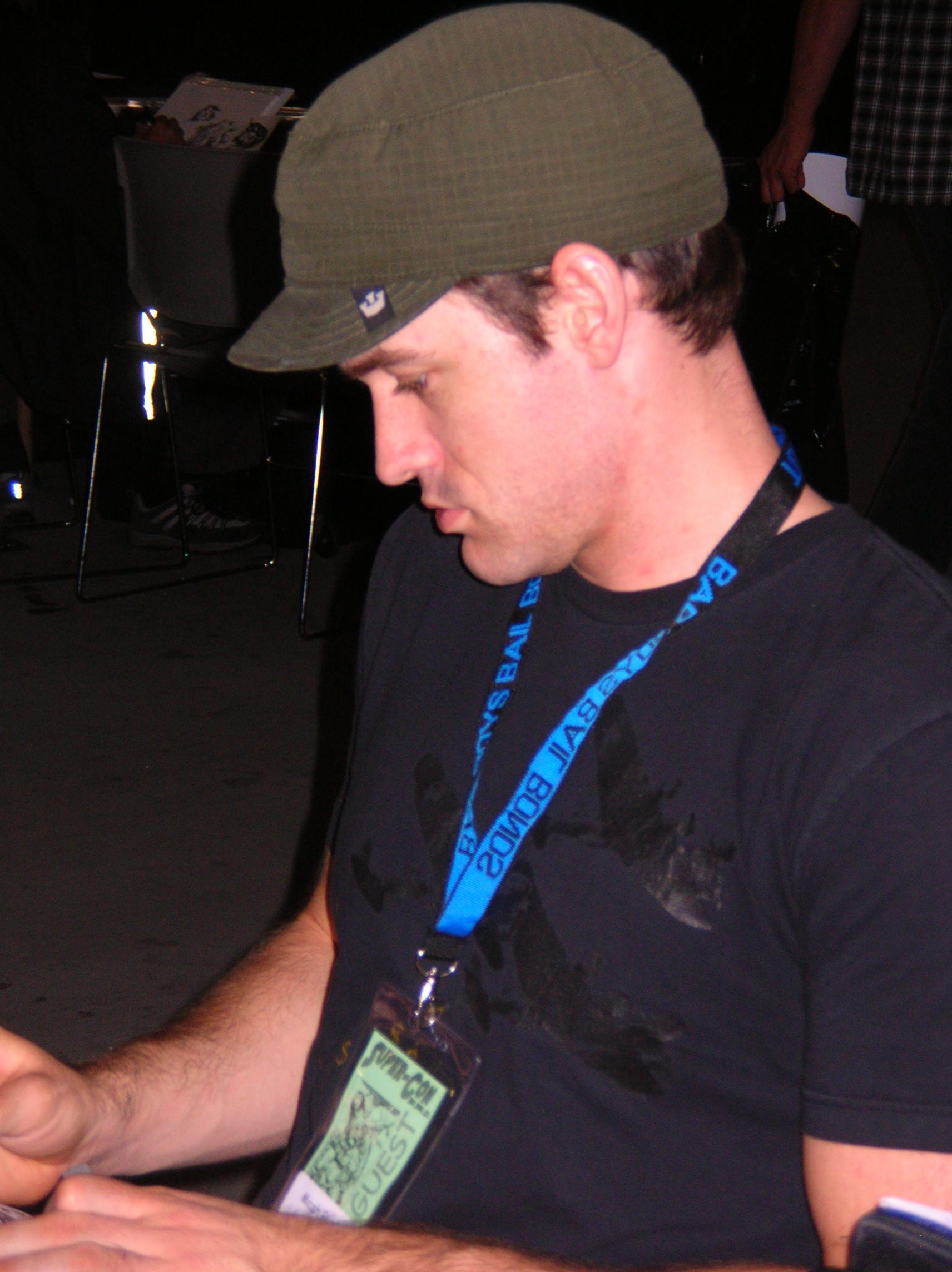
Gunnell in May 2009

Micah Gunnell (born June 18, 1980) is an animation director, storyboard artist, and comic book artist who currently works for DreamWorks Animation in the United States. In addition to his work in comics, he has produced storyboards for several animated series, including Film Roman/Marvel's Ultimate Spider-Man, Nickelodeon's Teenage Mutant Ninja Turtles, Marvel's Guardians of the Galaxy, and Avengers Assemble. He has also directed Marvel's Avengers animated series and is currently a director on DreamWorks' Fast and Furious: Spy Racers series which is available on Netflix.

== Bibliography ==
- Executive Assistant: ORCHID miniseries
- Dellec vol. 1
- Aspen Showcase: Benoist
- Shrugged #0-8
- Shrugged: Beginnings #1
- Soulfire: Dying of the Light #0-5
- Aspen Seasons Spring 2005
- Deadpool Team-Up#890
