= Marcus To =

Canadian comic book artist (born 1983)

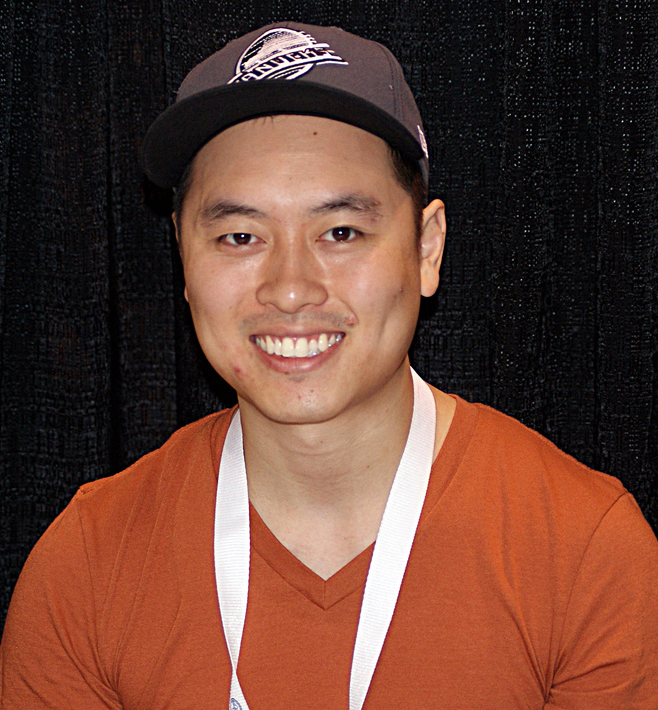
- To in June 2011
- Born: Marcus Anthony To; October 20, 1983 (age 43) Red Deer, Alberta, Canada
- Area: Artist
- Notable works: Red Robin; Huntress

Marcus To (born 20 October 1983) is a Canadian comic book artist who currently works for Marvel Comics as the artist for Excalibur. He is best known for his work on Red Robin, Huntress, and Soulfire. On July 9, 2012, it was announced that To is the artist for the North American adaptation of Cyborg 009, due to be released in July 2013. To drew The Multiversity: Guidebook (March 2015), the sixth issue of Grant Morrison's The Multiversity project.

== Bibliography ==
=== Aspen Comics ===
- Fathom vol. 2 #8-9 (fill-in work, 2004)
- Aspen Seasons Spring 2005 (one-shot, 2005)
- Aspen Seasons Fall 2005 (one-shot, 2005)
- Fathom: Cannon Hawke #1-5 (mini-series, 2005–2006)
- Soulfire: Chaos Reign #0-3, Beginnings #1 (mini-series, 2006)
- Fathom: Kiani #0, 1-4 (mini-series, 2007)
- Aspen Seasons Winter 2009 (one-shot, 2009)
- Soulfire vol. 2 #0-9 (mini-series, 2009–2011)

=== Boom! Studios ===
- Cyborg 009 (graphic novel, 2013)
- Hacktivist vol. 1 #1-4 (mini-series, 2014)
- Hacktivist vol. 2 #1-6 (mini-series, 2015)
- Joyride #1-12 (ongoing, 2016–2017)

=== DC Comics ===
- Red Robin #6-21, 23-26 (ongoing, 2010 - 2011)
- Teen Titans vol. 3 #100 (ongoing, 2011)
- Huntress vol. 3 #1-6 (mini-series, 2011–2012)
- The Flash vol. 4 #10-11, 15, Annual #1 (ongoing, 2012–2013)
- Batwing #9-15, #0 (ongoing, 2012–2013)
- Superboy vol. 6 #23 (fill-in, 2013)
- Adventures of Superman vol. 2 #6 (mini-series, 2013)
- Earth 2 #27 (fill-in, 2014)
- Nightwing vol. 4 #10-15, 23 (ongoing, 2017)
- Justice League/Power Rangers vol. 4 #1 (mini-series, 2017)
- Justice League: Power Rangers #2-3 (mini-series, 2018)
- Batman: Urban Legends #1-present (ongoing, 2021–present)

=== IDW Publishing ===
- Star Trek: Boldy Go #17 (fill-in, 2018)

=== Marvel Comics ===
- Black Panther #24-25 (fill-in, 2007)
- The New Warriors vol. 5 #1-4, 7–8, 10-12 (ongoing, 2014)
- New Avengers vol. 4 #8-10 (ongoing, 2016)
- All New Guardians of the Galaxy #8 (fill-in, 2017)
- Guardians of the Galaxy #146-150 (ongoing, 2017–2018)
- X-Men Blue #27-28, #33-36 (ongoing, 2018)
- Age of X-Man: NextGen #1-4 (mini-series, 2019)
- Excalibur #1- (ongoing, 2019)
- Shang-Chi and the Ten Rings #1- (ongoing, 2022)
