= Koi Turnbull =

American comic book artist

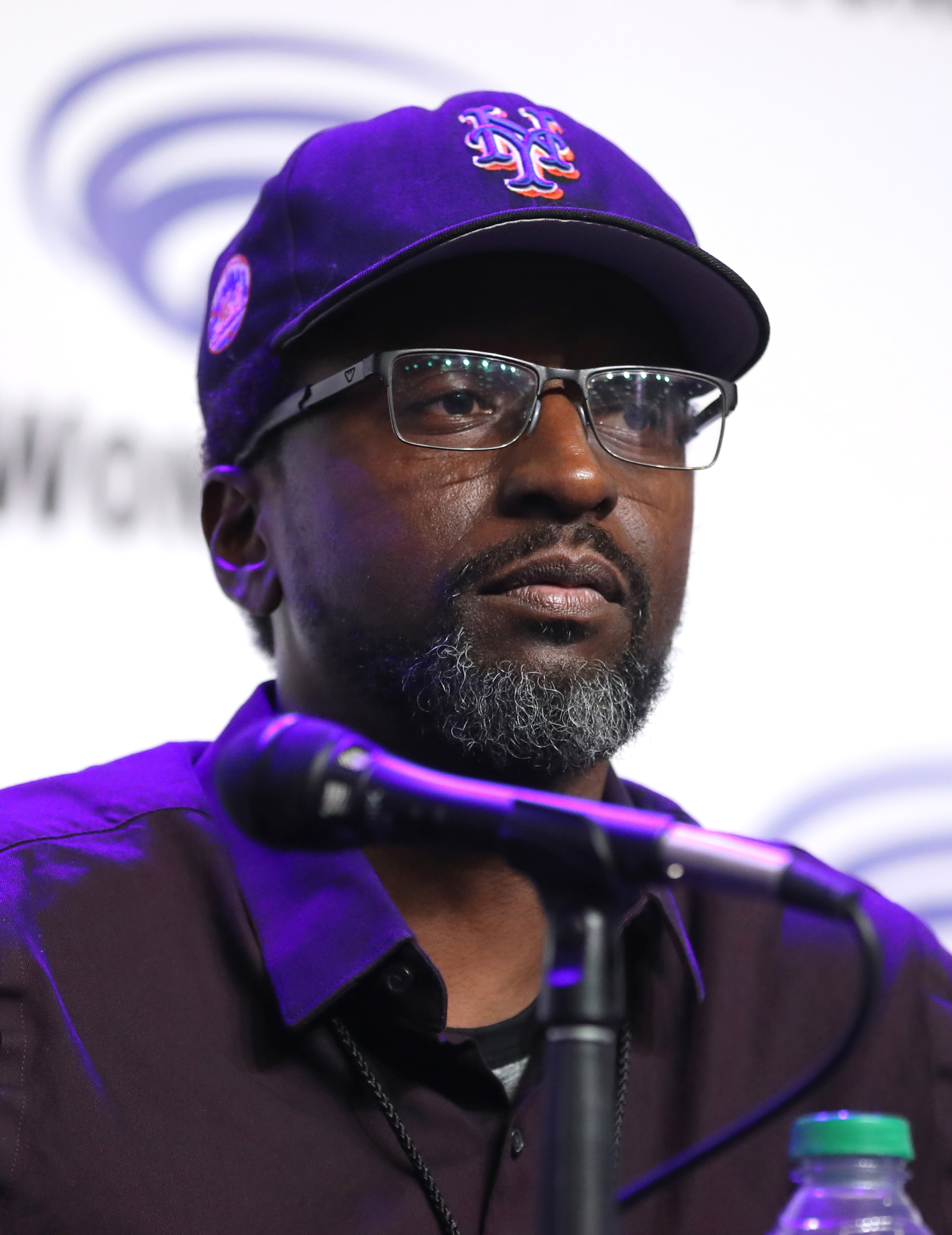
- Turnbull at the 2024 WonderCon
- Born: Coy Winston Turnbull Elmhurst, Queens, New York
- Areas: Writer, Penciller, Artist
- Pseudonym: Coy Turnbull
- Spouse: Yazmin Khan
- www.koiturnbull.com

Koi Turnbull (sometimes credited as Coy Turnbull) is an American comic book artist, known for his work with DC Comics, Marvel, Aspen MLT's Fathom.

== Early life and career ==
Coy Turnbull (the original spelling) was born on December 12, in Elmhurst, Queens, New York. Most of his early years were spent in New York. When he was 13, Turnbull's family moved to Asheboro, North Carolina. There, he learned the ins and outs of the comic industry from working at a local comic shop with fellow future comic inker John "Waki" Wycough. Turnbull learned from the likes of local artist Randy Green and Rick Ketcham, who mentored him in preparation for a future in comics. In 1997, Turnbull moved back to New York to pursue a career in comics. His skills were noticed and he began work as a background artist on Marvel projects for Adam Pollian and Walter McDaniel.

In 2002, Turnbull's big break happened during the Wizard World Chicago Comic Convention, at a portfolio review with Aspen MLT's Frank Mastromauro (Executive Vice President) and Peter Steigerwald (Vice President of Publishing). The work caught their eyes, and a week after the con they contacted him about future employment with Aspen MLT.

After receiving the penciler job with Aspen MLT, Turnbull moved to Santa Monica, California to work in the Marina Del Rey studio. Working under the direction of Michael Turner, Turnbull's talent grew, and with that followed Turner's run on Fathom with his own run starting with Fathom Volume 2. Not feeling hindered by the large fan following of Turner's work, Turnbull was able to follow Mike's work with his own and bring his influence to the comic during his run.

Following Turnbull's run on Fathom, he has since found work with DC Comics (working on Flash and Superman Confidential), Marvel Comics (Terror INC, New Warriors, Black Panther and One Month 2 Live storyline) and other comic projects.

== Bibliography ==
=== Interior and cover art ===
- The 3-minute Sketchbook (2007) #1
- Aspen Seasons: Spring 2005 (2005) #1 #1 (Aspen Exclusive) #1 (Wizard World LA variant)
- Batgirl #11 and TPB vol.02
- Batman: Gotham Knights #12
- Black Panther collected edition, TPB vol.04, #23 and #24
- Detective Comics #756
- Ex Parte #1 and #2
- The Flash (1987) #237 - "Superman's Cape"
- Green Lantern (1990) Annual 09 - "Mother of Heaven"
- Heroes (2006) #1 - "Monsters"
- Shrugged #4
- Heroes (2007)
1. HC vol. 01 (Alex Ross cover) - "Volume One"
2. HC vol. 01 (Jim Lee cover) - "Volume One"
3. TPB vol. 01 - "Volume One"
- Justice Leagues Justice League of Arkham (2001) - #1 "Justice Leagues Part IV: Taking Over the Asylum"
- New Warriors (2007)
1. TPB vol. 03 - "Secret Invasion"
2. #14 - "Invaded: Part 1"
3. #15 - "Invaded: Part 2"
- Nova (1999) #5 - "Lo, There Shall Come A Spider"
- Outsiders Five of a Kind (2008) - TPB
- Outsiders Five of a Kind - Thunder/Martian Manhunter (2007) #1 - "Five of a Kind, Part 3: Bug-Eyed Monsters"
- Purgatori (2001) - #1 (Standard Cover) - "Love Bites"
- Superman Confidential (2007) #6 - "Welcome to Mer-Tropolis", #7 - "Welcome to Mer-Tropolis, Conclusion"
- Superman Metropolis Secret Files and Origins (2000) - #1
- Terror, Inc. - "Apocalypse Soon" (2009)
1. TPB
2. 1 - "A Long Time Coming"
3. 2 - "Snake in the Grass"
4. 3 - "The Enemy of My Enemy is My Friendly Enemy"
5. 4 - "Sick? Or Sick and Tired?"
- Vamperotica (1993) - #12
- What If...? (1989) #112 - "What If... Starring Ka-Zar: New York... ...The New Savage Land... ...No Escape!"
- Wolverine: "Dangerous Games" (2008) Premiere HC - "Wolverine: Dangerous Games, TPB"
- Wolverine: "Killing Made Simple" (2008) - #1
- Worlds of Aspen (2006) #1 - "Say Hello To Aspen (...Kiani and Grace too!)"
- Fathom (2005)
1. 0 TPB - "Fathom Vol 2"
2. 0 - "Fathom Zero"
3. 0 (Cover B - Wizard World Los Angeles Exclusive) - "B - Wizard World Los Angeles Variant"
4. 0 (Cover C - Wizard World Los Angeles VIP Exclusive) - "Fathom Zero"
5. 1 - "Poseidon Shrugged"
6. 1 (Cover B - Direct Edition) - "Poseidon Shrugged"
7. 1 (Cover C - Wizard World Philadelphia Exclusive) - "Poseidon Shrugged"
8. 1 (Cover D - Wizard World Philadelphia Exclusive) - "Poseidon Shrugged"
9. 1 (Cover E - Wizard World Philadelphia VIP Exclusive) - "Poseidon Shrugged"
10. 2 - "Illumination"
11. 2 (Cover B - JayCompanyComics.com Exclusive) - "Illumination"
12. 3 - "Illumination (Part II)"
13. 3 (Cover B - Wizard World Chicago Exclusive) - "Illumination (Part II)"
14. 4 - "Missing Persons"
15. 4 (Cover B - Direct Edition (Blue)) - "Missing Persons"
16. 4 (Cover C - Direct Edition (Black)) - "Missing Persons"
17. 4 (Cover D - Direct Edition (Water)) - "Missing Persons"
18. 4 (Cover E - Armageddon Supanova Exclusive) - "Missing Persons"
19. 4 (Cover F - Wizard World Texas VIP Exclusive) - "Missing Persons"
20. 5 - "Self Preservation"
21. 6 - "The Road to Damnation"
22. 7 - "Gut Check"
23. 7 (Cover B - Wizard World Los Angeles Exclusive) - "Gut Check"
24. 8 - "Reunited"
25. 8 (Cover B - Wizard World Los Angeles Exclusive) - "Reunited"
26. 9 - "Running Deep"
27. 10 - "Boiling Point"
28. 10 (Cover B - Wizard World Chicago VIP Exclusive) - "Boiling Point"
29. 10 (Cover C - Wizard World Chicago Exclusive) - "Boiling Point"
30. 11 - "Watershed"
31. 11 (Cover B - Wizard World Texas Exclusive) - "Watershed"
32. Fathom cover Vol.2 #1,5-11
- Fathom Beginnings (2005)
1. 1 - "Paradise"
2. 1 (Australia/New Zealand Exclusive Cover) - "Paradise"
- Fathom: Cannon Hawke (2004)
1. Prelude - "Crossing Over"
2. Prelude (Wizard World East)
3. Prelude (Wizard World East cover B)
4. 1 - "Beginnings"
5. 0 - "Coldspell"
6. 0 (Dynamic Forces Cover) - "Coldspell"
7. 0 (San Diego Comicon 2004 Cover) - "Coldspell"
- Fathom: Cannon Hawke: Dawn of War (2004)
1. 1 - "Perspective"
2. 1 (Cover A) - "Perspective"
