= Deadman and the Flying Graysons =

2011 comic book limited series by DC Comics

Publication information
- Publisher: DC Comics
- Format: Limited series
- Publication date: June - August 2011
- No. of issues: 3
- Main character(s): Deadman; Dick Grayson

Creative team
- Created by: J.T. Krul
- Written by: J.T. Krul
- Artist(s): Mikel Janin; Fabrizio Fiorentino
- Editor: Cliff Chiang

Deadman and the Flying Graysons is a 2011 three-issue comic book limited series published by the publishing company DC Comics for the Flashpoint crossover event series. The series features the characters Deadman and the Flying Graysons working at Haly's Circus in an alternative universe from the main DC Comics continuity.

== Plot ==
Boston Brand (also known as Deadman) is attempting to pull off a trick after his co-workers John and Mary Grayson and their son Dick have done theirs. Brand intentionally outdoes theirs to show off. Afterwards Dick and his parents help with the packing and cleaning of the circus, but Boston declines to lend a hand, saying that he can not risk tearing his costume, or possibly injuring one of his hands, because if he did there would be no show. As the Graysons walk away, they discuss how much of an ego they think Boston has. A while later the Graysons join the resistance against the Atlantean/Amazon war. When the circus gets attacked by Amazons Mary and John are killed, and Boston has to protect Dick.

== Publication history ==
The series was written by J.T. Krul, with Mikel Janin doing illustrations for the first issue, but the second and third saw art duties being taken over by Fabrizio Fiorentino. Cliff Chiang served as editor during all three issues.

== Reception ==
The series holds an average rating of 6.3 by 16 professional critics on review aggregation website Comic Book Roundup.

== Prints ==
=== Issues ===
No.	Title	Cover date	Comic Book Roundup rating	Estimated sales (first month)
#1	The Show Must Go On	August 2011	7.0 by six professional critics.	32,950, ranked in North American
#2	All Eyes On the Prize	September 2011	6.0 by six professional critics.	26,177, ranked in North American
#3	Death of the Family	October 2011	6.0 by four professional critics.	25,991, ranked in North American

=== Collected editions ===
Title	Format	Material collected	Pages	Publication date	ISBN	Estimated sales
Flashpoint: The World of Flashpoint Featuring Batman	Trade paperback (TPB)	Flashpoint: Batman Knight of Vengeance #1–3, Deadman and the Flying Graysons #1–3, Deathstroke and the Curse of the Ravager #1–3 and Secret Seven #1–3	272	March 14, 2012	9781401234058	

== See also ==
- List of DC Comics publications
- List of Batman comics
