= The Iron Saint =

2007 comic mini-series by Jason Rubin

- The Iron Saint Cover by Chris Bachalo

Publication information
- Publisher: Series: Aspen Comics Collected: Top Cow Productions
- Schedule: monthly
- Format: Mini-series
- Publication date: September 2007
- No. of issues: 5

Creative team
- Created by: Jason Rubin
- Written by: Jason Rubin
- Artist(s): Francis Manapul (foreground); Joel Gomez (background)

The Iron Saint, originally known as Iron and the Maiden, is American company Aspen Comics' first creator-owned comic book. It was created by Jason Rubin, co-founder of Naughty Dog, the key creative force behind Crash Bandicoot and Jak and Daxter. The series was released in September 2007. A one-shot titled Brutes, Bims and the City was released February 2008. The trade paperback was released by Top Cow Productions in September 2010.

== Creators ==
As well as Rubin on scripting duties, penciling is being done by Witchblade artist Francis Manapul, with backgrounds by Joel Gomez. Coloring is being done by Danimation, with cover art coming from industry veteran Jeff Matsuda. The character concept art was created by Joe Madureira, of Battle Chasers fame, and Matsuda. Concept design work was handled by Blur Studio.

== Plot ==
The Iron Saint was originally a four-issue mini-series titled Iron and the Maiden. It was followed up by a one-shot: Iron and the Maiden: Brutes, Bims and the City. The series portrays an alternate-universe 1930s metropolis. "The City" is struggling to survive a three-way battle for power between The Government, the ominous religious sect known as The Order and the seedy criminal underbelly led by The Syndicate. Caught in the middle of this war for power, Michael Iron discovers firsthand the meaning of sacrifice, his only hope for survival coming in the form of a forgiving angel and several more surprises along the way.

Rubin has described it as "a cross between a '30s gangster film, Escape from New York and Beauty and the Beast."

== Controversy ==
In 2009, British heavy metal band Iron Maiden sued Rubin and Aspen Comics, citing Iron and the Maiden as an infringement of their trademark.

Recent solicitations for the collected edition show that the series has been renamed The Iron Saint.
