= Peter Steigerwald =

American comic book artist

- Areas: Writer, Penciller, Inker, Editor, Colourist

Peter Steigerwald is an American comic book artist primarily known for his work as a colorist and his work at Aspen Comics. He has also worked in inking, writing, and graphic design.

== Career ==
Steigerwald first worked with Top Cow Productions, colouring covers and interiors and designing most of their comic book productions. Peter also painted a number of trading cards for such popular Top Cow comics as Witchblade and Fathom. In 2003, Peter, along with many other Top Cow artists and staff, moved away from Top Cow with Michael Turner to form a new comic company known as Aspen Comics. There, Peter took on a much larger role, acting as Vice President of Publishing, as well as continuing to use his graphic design and colouring skills.

Since joining Aspen, Steigerwald has colored a great deal of comics, covers, and pin-ups for his co-worker, Michael Turner. His work with Aspen has also led him to do cover colors for many DC and Marvel comics.

Since 2010, he has been the main colorist for Joe Benitez' Lady Mechanika steampunk series.

Steigerwald has also worked on the Heroes graphic novels through his work at Aspen. He started off as just a colourist but has moved onto drawing the novels too.

He is currently co-owner of Aspen Comics.

== Bibliography ==
=== Colorist ===
==== Aspen MLT ====
- Michael Turner Presents: Aspen, miniseries, #1-3 (covers, 2003)
- Aspen Splash Spectacular (covers, 2006–08)
- Aspen Seasons:
  - Fall (cover, 2005)
  - Spring (cover, 2005)
  - Summer (cover, 2006)
  - Winter (cover, 2009)
- Aspen Sketchbook #1
- Soulfire, vol. 1, #0-10 (covers & interiors, 2004–09)
- Soulfire, vol. 2, #0-8 (covers, 2009–11)
- Soulfire, vol. 3, #0-2 (covers, 2011)
- Soulfire: Chaos Reign, miniseries, #0-3 (covers, 2006–07)
- Soulfire: Dying of the Light, miniseries, #0-5 (covers, 2005)
- Worlds of Aspen #1-4, 2010 (covers, 2006–10)
- Lady Mechanika, vol. 1, #0-3 (covers, interiors, & logo design, 2010–12)

==== Benitez Productions ====
- Lady Mechanika, vol. 1, #4-5 (covers & interiors, 2015)
- Lady Mechanika: The Tablet of Destinies, vol. 2, #1-6 (covers, 2015)
- Lady Mechanika: The Lost Boys of West Abbey, #1-2 (covers & interiors, 2016)
- Lady Mechanika: La Dama de la Muerte, #1-3 (covers & interiors, 2016)

==== DC ====
- Action Comics #812-813 (covers & interiors, 2004)
- Adventures of Superman #625-626 (covers & interiors, 2004)
- Justice League of America, vol. 4 #0, 2 (covers, 2006)
- Rann-Thanagar War, miniseries, #1-6 (covers, 2005)
- Supergirl, vol. 4, #1-3, 5, 8-13 (covers & interiors, 2005–07)
- Superman, vol. 2, #202-203 (covers & interiors, 2004)
- Superman/Batman #8-13 (full colors); #26 (among other colorists, 2004-06)
- Teen Titans, vol. 3, #1 (variant cover, 2003)
- Wildstorm: Winter Special (2004)

==== Image ====
- Cyblade/Ghost Rider #1
- Darkness #20, 25
- Ekos Preview
- EVO #1
- Fathom, vol. 1, #1-14 (1998-2002)
- Tomoe/Witchblade: Fire Sermon #1
- Witchblade #61

==== Marvel ====
- Battlestar Galactica #1 (cover)
- Civil War, miniseries, #1-3, 5, 7 (variant covers, 2006-07)
- Ms. Marvel, vol. 2, #1 (variant cover, 2006)
- Ultimate Comics: X
- Wolverine: Origins #1 (variant cover, 2006)

=== Cover Artist ===
- Lady Mechanika, vol. 1, #4-5, (Steigerwald Limited Exclusive Edition for Rupp's Comics, 2015)
- Lady Mechanika: La Dama de la Muerte, #1 (Steigerwald Limited Exclusive Edition for Rupp's Comics, 2016)
- Kato, vol. 1, #4, (Cover A, with Joe Benitez)
- Spider-Man/Red Sonja, vol. 1, #1-5, (All Covers and Variants, with Michael Turner)

=== Inker ===
- Aspen Seasons: Fall 2005
- Aspen Seasons: Summer 2006
- Aspen Sketchbook #1
- Nine Volt #4

=== Penciller ===
- Aspen Seasons: Fall 2005
- Aspen Seasons: Summer 2006

=== Writer ===
- Aspen Seasons: Fall 2005
- Aspen Seasons: Summer 2006
