= Superman/Batman =

2003-2011 superhero comic book series

- Cover of Superman/Batman #1 (August 2003). Art by Ed McGuinness.

Publication information
- Publisher: DC Comics
- Schedule: Monthly
- Format: Ongoing series
- Publication date: October 2003 – August 2011
- No. of issues: 87 + 5 Annuals
- Main character(s): Superman; Batman

Creative team
- Created by: Jeph Loeb; Ed McGuiness
- Written by: List: Jeph Loeb Mark Verheiden Alan Burnett Joe Kelly Dan Abnett Andy Lanning Michael Green Mike Johnson Len Wein Joe Casey Scott Kolins Paul Levitz Chris Roberson Cullen Bunn Joshua Hale Fialkov
- Penciller: List: Ed McGuinness Michael Turner Carlos Pacheco Pat Lee Ethan Van Sciver Matthew Clark Dustin Nguyen Shane Davis Rafael Albuquerque Rags Morales Whilce Portacio Scott Kolins Ardian Syaf Jerry Ordway Ed Benes ChrisCross
- Inker: List: Dexter Vines Jesus Merino Matt Banning Andy Lanning Derek Fridolfs
- Colorist: List: Dave Stewart Peter Steigerwald Laura Martin Lee Loughridge Dave McCaig Pete Pantazis Brad Anderson Guy Major Danny Luvisi

Collected editions
- Public Enemies: ISBN 1-4012-0323-X
- Supergirl: ISBN 1401203477
- Absolute Power: ISBN 1401204473
- Vengeance: ISBN 1401209211
- Enemies Among Us: ISBN 1401213308
- Torment: ISBN 1401217001
- The Search for Kryptonite: ISBN 1401219330

Superman/Batman, also known as Batman/Superman, is a monthly American comic book series published by DC Comics and featuring the publisher's two most popular superheroes: Superman and Batman. Superman/Batman premiered in August 2003, an update of the previous series, World's Finest Comics (1941–1986), in which Superman and Batman regularly joined forces.

Superman/Batman explores the camaraderie, antagonism, and friendship between its title characters. Jeph Loeb, the series' first writer, introduced a dual-narrator technique to present the characters' often opposing viewpoints and estimations of each other, which subsequent series writers have maintained. Prior to the events of Batman and the Outsiders #1 (1983), the two iconic characters were depicted as the best of friends. Frank Miller's landmark series The Dark Knight Returns subsequently depicted the heroes as adversaries in a future timeline. This dynamic became standard with John Byrne's The Man of Steel, a Superman reboot published in 1986.

After the first 13 issues, most of the story arcs were independent and self-contained from the ongoing or crossover storylines in the other Batman and Superman comic titles. Superman/Batman #26, Loeb's final issue, features a story written by his son Sam, who died from cancer prior to its release. Twenty-six writers and artists who knew Sam worked on the issue, donating fees and royalties to the Sam Loeb College Scholarship Fund.

As part of The New 52, a series titled Batman/Superman was released from 2013 to 2016. A second Batman/Superman series was released in August 2019, with issue #16 as part of DC's Infinite Frontier.

A new ongoing series by Mark Waid titled Batman/Superman: World's Finest was released in March 2022.

== Superman/Batman (2003–2011) ==
=== Jeph Loeb ===
Jeph Loeb, who wrote Superman for two years before the launch of the title, wrote the book for the first two years of its publication. Unlike later writers, Loeb's work on the book lasted for several storylines, which were interconnected.

In the first story arc, "The World's Finest", also referred to as "Public Enemies" (issues #1–6, illustrated by Ed McGuinness), then-U.S. President Lex Luthor declares Superman and Batman enemies of the state, claiming that a Kryptonite asteroid headed for Earth is connected to an evil plot by Superman. Luthor offers a $1,000,000,000 bounty, which encourages both supervillains and superheroes to attack. Superman almost kills Lex, with Batman standing aside. Superman changes his mind at the last moment. The new Toyman, Hiro Okamura, assists with the asteroid's destruction. Captain Atom is seemingly killed. The danger averted and Luthor's plans in jeopardy, Luthor injects himself with a mixture of Venom and synthetic Kryptonite, dons a battle suit from Apokolips, and confronts Batman and Superman. Luthor is defeated and appears to die in the battle, although he is shown to survive. In the course of the fight, Luthor is exposed to the world as a villain for the first time in post-Crisis continuity. Losing the presidency, Luthor is succeeded in office by Pete Ross.

In "Protégé" (issue #7, illustrated by Pat Lee), Superboy and Robin investigate Toyman for their mentors.

In "The Supergirl from Krypton" (issues #8–13, illustrated by Michael Turner), the Kryptonite asteroid is revealed to hold a pod that contains Superman's cousin Kara Zor-El. Batman says her arrival is too coincidental. Wonder Woman abducts Kara to Themyscira to train her for combat. Darkseid kidnaps Kara, intending her to be the new leader of the Female Furies. She is rescued from Darkseid and taken back to Earth. The villain follows, seemingly killing Kara at the home of Jonathan and Martha Kent. An enraged Superman throws Darkseid into the Source, entrapping him. However, Kara is back in Themyscira and is introduced to the world as Supergirl. This story arc marked the only time in Michael Turner's career that he provided interior art for a company other than Top Cow Productions or his own publisher, Aspen Comics. The story was dedicated to Christopher Reeve, who died during the year the storyline ended.

In "Absolute Power" (issues #14–18, illustrated by Carlos Pacheco), Legion of Super-Villains members Lightning Lord, Saturn Queen, and Cosmic King eliminate members of the Justice League of America, except for young Superman and Batman, whom they raise as their own children. Batman and Superman are raised to be dictators of the world, eliminating all opposition and killing people who would otherwise be their friends. During a fight with Wonder Woman and the Freedom Fighters, as Uncle Sam has been given Hal Jordan's power ring, during which Batman is killed but Superman is able to kill Diana with her lasso, the timeline is thrown into chaos, and the two men travel through alternate timelines. Darkseid makes a deal with them in one reality to send them back through time to stop the supervillains who raised them from altering history. When trying to change Batman's history back, Batman breaks down and shoots Joe Chill – the killer of Thomas Wayne and Martha Wayne. The Legion then team up with Ra's al Ghul to take over the world. Superman and Batman restore history, but the murders they committed haunt them.

Issue #19 (illustrated by Ian Churchill) is a stand-alone backdoor pilot story for the Supergirl series. The issue was later reprinted as Supergirl #0.

In "With a Vengeance!" (issues #20–25, illustrated by Ed McGuiness), Mister Mxyzptlk battles the Joker, who has tricked Bat-Mite out of his powers, using other characters as their pawns. Superman and Batman fight a team of superheroes from an alternate universe called the Maximums (a pastiche of the Ultimates). Keeping the bargain he made in "Absolute Power", Superman frees Darkseid from the Source Wall. Double-crossed, Superman becomes stuck in the wall himself. Bizarro and multiple Supergirls rescue him. Everyone so far and many more other duplicates fight in an arena before Bat-Mite escapes. The two imps tie up all loose ends with their cosmic powers. Additionally, Superman, Batman and the Toyman discover that Captain Atom is alive.

=== Mark Verheiden ===
Superman writer and Smallville producer Mark Verheiden took over Superman/Batman with issue #27.

In "Never Mind" (issue #27, illustrated by Kevin Maguire), The Superman and Batman of Earth-Two discover that their minds have been transferred by the Ultra-Humanite and the original Brainwave into the bodies of Power Girl (Superman's cousin) and the Huntress (Batman's daughter). If they cannot reverse the process in time, the women's personalities will reassert themselves and destroy the men's consciousness, killing them.

In "The Enemies Among Us" (issues #28–33, illustrated by Ethan Van Sciver for Parts 1–3, with Matthew Clark picking up Parts 4–5 and Joe Benitez concluding with Part 6), Superman, Martian Manhunter and other alien superheroes are being controlled by an entity known as Blackrock, which later infects Batman when he takes the rock to successfully stand up to Superman. After Superman visits Lois Lane to be reminded why he fights for Earth, he is able to force Blackrock to leave Batman by convincing it that he will kill his friend to spare him being used by the rock. Tracking Blackrock to its source, they discover that it was actually being 'led' by Despero, who convinced an alien race that Earth was not worth saving by giving them access to Superman's mind during a period of self-doubt. Challenging the aliens to read his mind again, Superman convinces them that they were wrong about Earth.

In "A.I." (issues #34–36, illustrated by Pat Lee), Superman and Batman are introduced to Will Magnus and his malleable, shape-shifting Metal Men for the first time (in Post-Infinite Crisis continuity). Bruce Wayne hires the Metal Men as security guards. They go on a rampage and steal a prototype OMAC unit.

=== Alan Burnett ===
Known for his work on the DC Animated Universe and The Batman television series, Alan Burnett took over as writer of the series with issue #37.

In "Torment" (issues #37-42, illustrated by Dustin Nguyen), Superman is psychologically tortured by the Scarecrow and brought to the war planet Tartaros by DeSaad. DeSaad plants a mind-controlling spike in Superman's head, and sends him to retrieve Highfather's staff from the Source, which Darkseid plans to use to restore his powers. Batman comes after Superman, but is sidetracked by Bekka. Both are unable to control their attraction to one another. Superman retrieves the staff, but is trapped in the Source Wall as a result. Batman and Bekka take advantage of DeSaad's attempted betrayal of Darkseid to steal the staff and bring back Superman. Darkseid and DeSaad flee, and Tartarus is pulled into the hole Superman made in the Source when he escaped. Superman, Batman and Bekka return to Earth, bringing Scarecrow with them. Bekka is retrieved by Orion, and is later seen being killed by a shadowy assailant.

=== Dan Abnett and Andy Lanning ===
The team of Dan Abnett and Andy Lanning filled in for issue #43, and later wrote off of scripts from Mike Johnson for issues #57–59.

In "Darklight" (issue #43, illustrated by Mike McKone), Doctor Light infiltrates a dark matter fuel experiment on a Waynetech satellite, by creating solidgram versions of the original Teen Titans to distract the guards. He then uses the experiment's Kryptonian processor to enter the Fortress of Solitude. While Superman battles the Titan solidgrams, Batman manages to head off and defeat Light by trapping him in a Dark Matter crystal. Light is later freed by Lex Luthor, who wants him to join his new Injustice League.

In "Nanopolis" (issues #57–59), the Prankster tricks Superman and shrinks him to microscopic size. Batman must find him and return him to normal size. Before returning to normal, the two heroes must rescue the microscopic civilization whose existence has been inadvertently endangered by the Prankster.

=== Mike Johnson and Michael Green ===
As of issue #46, Mike Johnson joined with Michael Green to continue the series; issue #44 was the beginning of the new run. They are the first writers to hold regular roles on this series since Jeph Loeb.

In "K" (issues #44-49, illustrated by Shane Davis), Superman and Batman began a mission to collect and rid the Earth of every piece of Kryptonite, a substance lethal to Superman, which has been in great abundance since Kara's arrival earlier in this series. Along the way, Batman and Superman receive a lot of support from other heroes, including Firestorm, looking for membership in the JLA. They surprisingly also encounter some resistance, especially from the new Aquaman. This story also includes the reveal of two new variations of Kryptonite that have been also enhanced by a magical charm. One causes Superman to feel like a child and carefree for the day, which also has implications of a drug-like effect, while the second restores him to normal. As they continue to search, they encounter the Last Line, a team run by Amanda Waller and a new Kryptonite-powered version of Doomsday created by Waller. In the end, Superman decides to give Batman the last piece of Kryptonite, because he feels he needs his weakness to be human and also in case he goes rogue. After he flies away, the Caped Crusader retreats to the Batcave, where it is revealed that a sample of each Kryptonite variation, along with large chunks of green Kryptonite, are still kept there.

In "The Fathers" (issue #50), while rebuilding Smallville following the events of "K", Superman and Batman uncover a piece of Kryptonian technology that reveals that Jor-El came in contact with Thomas Wayne while searching for an appropriate planet to serve as baby Kal-El's new home. Jor-El was initially hesitant to send Kal-El to Earth until his meeting with Thomas Wayne convinced him otherwise.

In "Lil' Leaguers" (issues #51–52), Superman, Batman and the Justice League of America face miniature versions of themselves. These Lil' Leaguers are childlike versions of the heroes and have similar powers. They face off against the Lil' Villains, during which Lil' Superman is killed by a Father Box-enhanced Lil' Doomsday.

In "Super/Bat" (issues #53–56), Johnson and Green are joined by Rags Morales for a story about Superman's powers being transferred to Batman during a battle with Silver Banshee. Batman revels in his new powers and uses them to bring complete fear and order to Gotham's criminal underworld and eventually sets his sight on the rest of the world. Superman meanwhile, tries to lead a normal life as a husband and journalist. Their allies realized that the power switch has a psychological side effect to both men, as Batman's behavior becomes increasingly aggressive and Superman himself becomes emotionally depressed despite living the life he has always wanted, realizing that the transfer was the result of a curse that would give each man what they had always wanted, while simultaneously rendering them incapable of using it properly. With the aid of the Justice League, Superman returns himself and Batman to normal.

In "Mash-Up" (issues #60–61), Superman and Batman meet the Justice Titans in Gothamopolis and together they must take down the city's worst villains. Francis Manapul is on covers and interiors for this two-parter.

In "Sidekicked" (issue #62, illustrated by Rafael Albuquerque), Supergirl and Robin (Tim Drake) reminisce about their first mission as a team: a hostage crisis at Arkham Asylum. The inmates they confront include the Joker, Scarecrow, Two-Face, Clayface, Mad Hatter, Killer Croc, Poison Ivy, and Victor Zsasz.

In "Night and Day" (issue #63, illustrated by Albuquerque), Superman is forced to flee Earth when Gorilla Grodd succeeds in filling the planet's atmosphere with Kryptonite. Subsequently, Grodd conquers Earth, having used his mental abilities to control the minds of every remaining inhabitant of the planet except Batman, who resists using his mental discipline. This is broken when Alfred Pennyworth dies enabling Grodd to capture him. At Batman's execution Superman returns, now immune to the artificial Kryptonite released by Grodd thanks to Batman, and defeats the villain. However, this entire scenario is revealed to be a simulation created in the Batcomputer.

=== Joe Kelly ===
Joe Kelly worked on two Superman/Batman annuals, based on stories originally published during the Silver Age.

In "Stop Me If You've Heard This One..." (Annual #1, illustrated by Ed McGuinness, (2006)), Clark Kent and Bruce Wayne both end up on a cruise together along with Lois Lane. Along the way, they encounter Deathstroke and the Crime Syndicate. The members they face are Ultraman (Superman), Owlman (Batman), and Superwoman (Wonder Woman), who is Lois Lane in the Antimatter Universe. An alternate, unnamed version of Deathstroke also appears, characterized similarly to Deadpool. During the course of the adventure, Superman and Batman discover each other's secret identities and agree to work together, even though they disagree with each other's methods of operating. The issue is a reimagining of "The Mightiest Team In the World" (May 1952), in which the two heroes discover each other's secret identities and team up for the first time.

In "The Unexamined Life... " (Annual #2 (2008)), Superman loses his powers and takes on the identity of Supernova. The issue is a reimagining of World's Finest Comics #178 (September 1968) and World's Finest Comics #180 (November 1968). This story takes place early in the career of the original Robin and depicts his first meeting with Superman.

=== Len Wein ===
Len Wein's work has been exclusive to the third installment of the Annuals. This annual follows the trend set by Joe Kelly's work, reimagining another Silver Age tale.

In "Compound Fracture" (Annual #3 (2009)), Superman and Batman encounter the Composite Superman, a failed experiment of Professor Ivo with all the powers of the Justice League of America. The issue is a reimagining of "The Composite Superman", the tale from World's Finest Comics #142 (June 1964) where Superman, Batman and Robin must battle a new villain with all the powers of the Legion of Super-Heroes.

=== Joe Casey ===
In "Prelude to the Big Noise" (issue #64), Batman discovers information on Superman's origins that place the two in danger unless Superman is willing to sacrifice himself.

"The Big Noise" (issues #68–71)(issues #68–70 were illustrated by Ardian Syaf) Originally, "The Big Noise" was intended to relaunch the book as a flashback series dealing with the aftermath of various DC crossovers, but Casey's original scripts were devoid of references to the crossovers, scrapping the plan for future stories in the intended vein.

=== Peter Johnson and Matt Cherniss ===
"Sweet Dreams" ( issue #65) is a special Halloween issue showing what scares Superman and Batman, and also exposing the inner fears of Joker and Lex Luthor. This is revealed as an induced dream created by the Scarecrow who had captured them, but Batman is able to free himself and defeat the villain.

=== Scott Kolins ===
Scott Kolins wrote "Night of the Cure" (issues #66–67) as a special Blackest Night tie-in starring Bizarro and the Man-Bat.

=== Paul Levitz ===
"Worship" (#72–74) Paul Levitz wrote the lead story in issue #75, the anniversary issue, guest-starring the Legion of Super-Heroes. In addition, this issue featured an all-star lineup, including Steven T. Seagle, Billy Tucci, Adam Hughes, J.T. Krul, and David Finch.

"A Time Beyond Hope" (Annual #4 (2010))

=== Judd Winick ===
Judd Winick wrote "The Brave and the Bold" (issue #76). Following Bruce Wayne's death during Final Crisis, Superman has trouble coping with his friend's death, even informing Dick Grayson that he is essentially wearing Bruce's skin by dressing as Batman, but a conversation with Wonder Woman allows Clark to accept what has happened to his friend and acknowledge Grayson as the new Batman.

=== Joshua Williamson ===
Joshua Williamson wrote "Fright Night" (issue #77). After a shallow grave is discovered in Metropolis, Supergirl tries to get the help of Batman to investigate, but ends up only finding the current Robin, Damian Wayne, Even not doing well, they discover that the victims are killed by a sudden heart attack and all of them are employers of LexCorp. While infiltrating a party with another members, Supergirl finds the culprit to be Scarecrow, who wants revenge on Lex Luthor since the latter stole his Sinestro Corps power ring from him. He then uses a concentrated version of the fear gas to make Supergirl hallucinate, but Robin manages to calm her down and the duo arrest Scarecrow.

=== Chris Roberson ===
Chris Roberson wrote "Worlds' Finest" (issues #79–80). Coming directly from the DC One Million storyline, Epoch arrives in the 853rd century trying to conquering it and is quickly subdued by the Superman and Batman versions of that time. However, he reveals this all to be just a plan to get access to the Batcave and a powerful armor he uses to trap One Million Superman and Batman in an eternal time loop before going back and ends up battling Superman, Batman and Robin from the 21st century. Epoch again gains the upper hand by trapping the three inside an impenetrable barrier, but the heroes free themselves using their science skills as Superman breaks his time travel device, sending the villain randomly through time back to the 853rd century, where he is finally arrested by the Superman and Batman from that time.

=== Cullen Bunn ===
Cullen Bunn wrote "Sorcerer Kings" (issues #81–84). Phantom Stranger warns the Shadowpact about an upcoming magical threat. When they get to the appointed location, dozens of demons arise, followed by a silver-armored knight who fights them; after he is killed, the knight is revealed to be Superman. When the real Superman is informed, an alternative Batman appears and abducts him; meanwhile, the real Batman is working together with Detective Chimp, Doctor Occult, and Klarion the Witch Boy to find the demons' source. The strange Batman takes Superman to his world of origin - a possible future where the world was cursed in a spell summoned by Felix Faust, Morgaine le Fey, Brother Blood, and Blackbriar Thorn. The future Batman reveals that the Coven plan to send a powerful monster through time to assure their victory in the past.

=== James Robinson ===
"Reign of Doomsday" (Annual #5 (2011)), "Reign of Doomsday – Part Five: No Exit!", picks up where Justice League of America (vol. 2) #55 left off and continues the "Reign of Doomsday" storyline. Supergirl and Batman (Dick Grayson) are trapped on the Justice League satellite with the Cyborg Superman and Doomsday, who are attempting to tear each other apart, and ends with Doomsday beating and taking both Supergirl and the Cyborg. The story continues in Superboy (vol. 4) #6.

=== Joshua Hale Fialkov ===
Joshua Hale Fialkov wrote "The Secret" (issues #85–87). When the body of Garret Remington, a young journalist and friend of Perry White, is found in Metropolis, Clark Kent is assigned to the story. Somehow, Remington discovered Gotham City's greatest mystery: the identity of Batman. Batman warns Clark to stay away, especially after Clark finds Garret's original clue, a Batgadget with a Wayne Enterprises serial number that was left on by an inexperienced Batman. Batman's own investigation reveals the murder culprit to be the Joker, who attacks Clark for continuing Garret's story. Batman intervenes to protect Clark's secret identity. After apprehending Joker, Superman and Batman confront Martin Mayne, Garret Remington's boss, with the knowledge that he is the one who gave the tip to Joker in order to increase his newspaper's sales. Although the duo do not have enough evidence for a conviction, they reveal that Bruce Wayne had bought the journal and fired him. The series ends with a frank discussion between Batman and Superman about their respective roles as heroes.

== Batman/Superman (2013–2016) ==
In September 2011, The New 52 rebooted DC's continuity. In June 2013, a new series titled Batman/Superman began publication, featuring the story of the first encounter between the two heroes as they exist in the New 52 continuity. The series was originally written by Greg Pak and illustrated by Jae Lee. This first arc is set before the formation of the Justice League, shown in Justice League #1 (2011). Greg Pak wrote issues #1–9, #11–27, #3.1, Annuals #1–2, and Futures End #1. Issue #10 was written by Jeff Lemire and illustrated by Karl Kerschl and Scott Hepburn. Batman/Superman #28–30 were written by Tom Taylor and Robson Rocha.

Artwork for issues #5–7 was by Brent Booth, issues #8–9 and #12–15 were by Jae Lee, with issue #11 by Karl Kerschl, Tom Derenick and Daniel Sampere. Artwork for issues #16-24 and 26 was by Ardian Syaf, with issue #25 by Cliff Richards. Artwork for Annual #1 was by Jae Lee, Kenneth Rocafort, and Philip Tan, and Annual #2 by Tom Derenick Ian Churchill, Tyler Kirkham, Ardian Syaf, and Emanuela Lupacchino.

Owing to the end of the New 52 imprint, the Batman/Superman series concluded in May 2016 with issue #32. Unreleased issues #33 and 34, and Annual #3 were later published in the collection Batman/Superman Volume 6: Universe's Finest in 2017.

== Batman/Superman (2019–2021) ==
A second Batman/Superman series was announced by DC Comics in April 2019 and was released in August 2019, written by Joshua Williamson and art by David Marquez. Gene Luen Yang and Ivan Reis took over the series on issue #16, with the series ending its run in September 2021 on issue #22.

== Batman/Superman: World's Finest (2022–present) ==
In March 2022, DC Comics released Batman/Superman: World's Finest, a new comic series by writer Mark Waid and artist Dan Mora. The series is set in the "not-too-distant past".

== Sales history ==
The first issue of Superman/Batman was ranked 3rd in August 2003, with pre-order sales of 134,135. Marvel 1602 #1 and Batman #618 were ranked 1st and 2nd, respectively, for that period. Superman/Batman #11 was the highest selling comic for July 2004, with pre-order sales of 143,712.

== Collected editions ==
This series has been collected in the following formats:

Title	Material collected	ISBN
Batman & Superman World's Finest	Batman & Superman: World's Finest (1999) #1-10	Softcover: 1-4012-0082-6/978-1-4012-0082-4 (2003-10-29)
Volume 1: Public Enemies	Superman/Batman #1–6 "When Clark Met Bruce" from Superman/Batman Secret Files and Origins 2003	Hardcover: 1-4012-0323-X; Paperback: 1-4012-0220-9 (new edition) (2009-09-30)
Volume 2: Supergirl	Superman/Batman #8–13	Hardcover: 1-4012-0347-7; Paperback: 1-4012-0250-0
Volume 3: Absolute Power	Superman/Batman #14–18	Hardcover: 1-4012-0447-3; Paperback: 1-4012-0714-6
Volume 4: Vengeance	Superman/Batman #20–25	Hardcover: 1-4012-0921-1; Paperback: 1-4012-1043-0
Volume 5: Enemies Among Us	Superman/Batman #28–33	Hardcover: 1-4012-1330-8; Paperback: 1-4012-1243-3
Volume 6: Torment	Superman/Batman #37–42	Hardcover: 1-4012-1700-1; Paperback: 1-4012-1740-0
Volume 7: The Search for Kryptonite	Superman/Batman #44–49	Hardcover: 1-4012-1933-0; Paperback: 978-1-4012-2012-9
Volume 8: Finest Worlds	Superman/Batman #50–56	Hardcover: 1-4012-2331-1; Paperback: 1-4012-2332-X
Volume 9: Night & Day	Superman/Batman #60–63, 65–67	Hardcover: 1-4012-2792-9; Paperback: 1-4012-2808-9
Volume 10: Big Noise	Superman/Batman #64, #68–71	Paperback: 1-4012-2914-X
Volume 11: Worship	Superman/Batman #72–75 and Annual #4	Paperback: 1-4012-3032-6
Volume 12: Sorcerer Kings	Superman/Batman #78–84	Hardcover: 1-4012-3266-3; Paperback: 978-1-4012-3446-1
Absolute Superman/Batman Vol. 1	Superman/Batman #1–13	Hardcover: 978-1401240967
Absolute Superman/Batman Vol. 2	Superman/Batman #14–26	Hardcover: 978-1401248178
Superman/Batman Vol. 1	Superman/Batman #1–13 "When Clark Met Bruce" from Superman/Batman Secret Files and Origins 2003	Hardcover: 1-4012-0323-X; Paperback: 1-4012-4818-7
Superman/Batman Vol. 2	Superman/Batman #14–26	Paperback: 1-4012-5079-3
Superman/Batman Vol. 3	Superman/Batman #27–36 and Annual #1	Paperback: 1-4012-6480-8
Superman/Batman Vol. 4	Superman/Batman #37–49 and Annual #2	Paperback: 1-4012-6385-2
Superman/Batman Vol. 5	Superman/Batman #50–63 and Annual #3	Paperback: 1-4012-6528-6
Superman/Batman Vol. 6	Superman/Batman #64–75 and Annual #4	Paperback: 1-4012-7503-6
Superman/Batman Omnibus Vol. 1	Superman/Batman #1-43, Annual #1-2, and Superman/Batman Secret Files and Origins 2003	Hardcover: 978-1-77950-029-8
Superman/Batman Omnibus Vol. 2	Superman/Batman #44-87 and Annual #3-5	Hardcover: 978-1-77951-023-5
Superman/Batman: Michael Turner Gallery Edition	pencil art of Superman/Batman #8-13, recoloured by Peter Steigerwald	Hardcover: 1-4012-5706-2/978-1-4012-5706-4 (2015-08-26)
Superman/Batman: Public Enemies book and DVD/Blu-Ray set (Superman/Batman: Public Enemies graphic novel plus DC Universe original movie Superman/Batman: Public Enemies)	Superman/Batman Volume 1, Superman/Batman: Public Enemies DVD/Blu-Ray discs	1-4012-6389-5/978-1-4012-6389-8 (2016-02-24)
Batman/Superman Volume 1 Cross World	Batman/Superman (2013) #1-4, Justice League #23.1: Darkseid	Hardcover: 1-4012-4509-9/978-1-4012-4509-2 (2014-04-30); Softcover: 1-4012-4934-5/978-1-4012-4934-2 (2014-11-12)
Batman/Superman Cilt 1: Dünyalar Arasi	Batman/Superman (2013) #1-4, Justice League #23.1: Darkseid (Turkish edition by Jedbang Collectables (Jbc Yayıncılık))	Softcover: 605915513-8/978-605915513-7 (2016-02-24)
Batman/Superman: Encrucijada de mundos	Batman/Superman (2013) #1-4, Justice League #23.1: Darkseid (Spanish edition by ECC Ediciones)	Hardcover: 84-17827-52-8/978-84-17827-52-6 (2019-05-07)
Batman/Superman: Cross World/バットマン/スーパーマン:クロスワールド	Batman/Superman (2013) #1-4, Justice League #23.1: Darkseid (Japanese edition by Shogakukan-Shueisha Productions Co., Ltd.)	Softcover: 479687541-7/978-479687541-7 (2015-04-23)
Batman/Superman Volume 2 Game Over	Batman/Superman (2013) #5-9, Batman/Superman Annual #1, World's Finest #20-21	Hardcover: 1-4012-4935-3/978-1-4012-4935-9 (2014-11-12); Softcover: 1-4012-5423-3/978-1-4012-5423-0 (2015-05-06)
Batman/Superman Cilt 2 Oyun Bitti	Batman/Superman (2013) #5-9, Batman/Superman Annual #1, World's Finest #20-21 (Turkish edition by Jedbang Collectables (Jbc Yayıncılık))	Softcover: 605915523-5/978-605915523-6 (2014-10-18)
Batman/Superman: Fin de la Partida	Batman/Superman (2013) #5-9, Batman/Superman Annual #1, World's Finest #20-21 (Spanish edition by ECC Ediciones)	Hardcover: 8417827544/978-8417827540 (2019-06-04)
Batman/Superman Volume 3 Second Chance	Batman/Superman (2013) #10-15	Hardcover: 1-4012-5424-1/978-1-4012-5424-7 (2015-05-06); Softcover: 1-4012-5754-2/978-1-4012-5754-5 (2015-12-16)
Batman/Superman Cilt 3 İkinci Şans	Batman/Superman (2013) #10-15 (Turkish edition by Jedbang Collectables (Jbc Yayıncılık))	Softcover: 605915533-2/978-605915533-5 (2017-05-19); DC cover (SKU JBC-064); JBC variant cover (SKU JBC-064A)
Batman/Superman Volume 4 Siege	Batman/Superman (2013) #16-20, Batman/Superman Annual #2, Batman/Superman: Future's End #1	Hardcover: 1401257550/978-1401257552 (2015-12-16); Softcover: 978-1401263683 (2016-08-10)
Batman/Superman Cilt 4 Kuşatma	Batman/Superman (2013) #16-20, Batman/Superman Annual #2, Batman/Superman: Future's End #1 (Turkish edition by Jedbang Collectables (Jbc Yayıncılık))	Softcover: 978-605915549-6; DC cover (SKU JBC-126); JBC variant cover (SKU JBC-126A)
DC Comics Sneak Peek: Batman/Superman	Batman/Superman (2013) #21 (Divergence (sneak peek))	electronic (2015-05-20)
Batman/Superman Volume 5 Truth Hurts	Batman/Superman (2013) #21-27, Convergence: Booster Gold #2 (Sneak Peek)	Hardcover: 978-1401263690 (2016-08-10); Softcover: 978-1401268183 (2017-04-05)
Batman/Superman Cilt 5 Gerçekler Acıdır	Batman/Superman (2013) #21-27, Convergence: Booster Gold #2 (Sneak Peek) (Turkish edition by Jedbang Collectables (Jbc Yayıncılık))	Softcover: 978-605915550-2; DC cover (SKU JBC-134)
Batman/Superman Volume 6 Universe's Finest	Batman/Superman (2013) #28-34, Batman/Superman Annual #3	Hardcover: 1401268196/978-1401268190 (2017-04-05); Softcover: 1401271561/978-1401271565 (2017-08-16)
Batman/Superman Cilt 6 Evrenin En İyileri	Batman/Superman (2013) #28-34, Batman/Superman Annual #3 (Turkish edition by Jedbang Collectables (Jbc Yayıncılık))	Softcover: 978-605771232-5; DC cover (SKU JBC-143)
Batman/Superman: World's Finest Volume 1: The Devil Nezha	Batman/Superman: World's Finest (2022) #1-5, material from Detective Comics (2016) #1050	Hardcover: ISBN 978-1779518408; Softcover: ISBN 978-1779524706
Batman/Superman: World's Finest Volume 2: Strange Visitor	Batman/Superman: World's Finest (2022) #6-11	Hardcover: ISBN 978-1779520487; Softcover: ISBN 978-1779527165
Batman/Superman: World's Finest Volume 3: Elementary	Batman/Superman: World's Finest (2022) #12-17	Hardcover: ISBN 978-1779524775; Softcover: ISBN 978-1779529787
Batman/Superman: World's Finest Volume 4: Return to Kingdom Come	Batman/Superman: World's Finest (2022) #20-24	Hardcover: ISBN 978-1779529398; Softcover: ISBN 978-1779529398
Batman/Superman: World's Finest Volume 5: Secret Origins	Batman/Superman: World's Finest (2022) #18-19, 25, 2024 Annual	Hardcover: ISBN 978-1799500339; Softcover: ISBN 978-1799500339
Batman/Superman: World's Finest Volume 6: IMPossible	Batman/Superman: World's Finest (2022) #26-30	Hardcover: ISBN 978-1799501893; Softcover: ISBN 978-1799501923
Batman/Superman: World's Finest Volume 7: Total Eclipso	Batman/Superman: World's Finest (2022) #31-34, Green Lantern/Green Arrow: World's Finest Special #1	Hardcover: ISBN 978-1799505266; Softcover: ISBN 978-1799505273
Batman/Superman: World's Finest Volume 8: 20,000 Leagues	Batman/Superman: World's Finest (2022) #35-37, 40-43	Hardcover: ISBN 978-1799506188; Softcover: ISBN 978-1799506195
Batman/Superman: World's Finest Volume 9: The Merger	Batman/Superman: World's Finest (2022) #44-49	Hardcover: ISBN 978-1799508632; Softcover: ISBN 978-1799508649

=== Other collected editions ===
- Supergirl Vol. 1: Power: includes Superman/Batman #19
- Supergirl Vol. 2: Candor: includes Superman/Batman #27
- Superman: Return of Doomsday: includes Superman/Batman Annual #5
- Superman/Batman: The Greatest Stories Ever Told: includes Superman/Batman Secret Files and Origins 2003 and Superman/Batman Annual #1
- DC Essentials: Superman/Batman #1 (2016-01-20): includes Superman/Batman #1

== In other media ==
- In 2002, The Batman/Superman Movie was released on DVD. This was actually a compilation of the three episodes from the "World's Finest" story arc of Season 2 of Superman: The Animated Series (1997) combined into a feature film.
- In 2004, a fan film for World's Finest was released.
- In the 2009 direct-to-video animated film Superman/Batman: Public Enemies (an adaptation of "World's Finest", the opening story arc of Superman/Batman), the Man of Steel and the Dark Knight team up to prevent a kryptonite meteoroid from striking Earth and to take down Lex Luthor, who has been elected President of the United States and has framed Superman for murder. DCAU cast members Kevin Conroy, Tim Daly, Clancy Brown and CCH Pounder reprised their respective roles as Batman, Superman, Luthor and Amanda Waller. Additionally, Allison Mack (Chloe Sullivan from the television series Smallville) voiced the role of Power Girl.
- In 2010, a sequel was released titled Superman/Batman: Apocalypse which is an adaptation of Jeph Loeb and Michael Turner's second story arc, "The Supergirl from Krypton". DCAU cast members Kevin Conroy, Tim Daly, Susan Eisenberg, and Edward Asner reprised their respective roles as Batman, Superman, Wonder Woman and Granny Goodness. Additionally, Summer Glau (from the television series Firefly) voiced the role of Supergirl and Andre Braugher (from the television series Homicide: Life on the Street) portrayed Darkseid.
- At the 2013 San Diego Comic-Con Zack Snyder, director of Man of Steel, confirmed an upcoming sequel for Man of Steel, titled Batman v Superman: Dawn of Justice; the movie was originally slated for release on July 17, 2015, but was pushed back to March 25, 2016. The film starred Henry Cavill reprising his role as Clark Kent/Superman and many of the first film's cast return. Ben Affleck also joins the cast as Bruce Wayne/Batman, along with Jesse Eisenberg as Lex Luthor and Jeremy Irons as Alfred Pennyworth, among others.
- Darkseid's ending in Injustice 2 is an homage to "The Supergirl from Krypton" storyline as he captures Kara and brainwashes her to get revenge on Superman.

== See also ==
- World's Finest
- Superman & Batman: Generations
- Superman/Batman: Public Enemies
- Superman/Batman: Apocalypse
