= Shrugged =

Publication information
- Publisher: Aspen MLT
- Format: Miniseries
- Publication date: August 2006 - February 2018
- No. of issues: 15

Creative team
- Created by: Michael Turner
- Written by: Frank Mastromauro, Michael Turner
- Penciller(s): Micah Gunnell, Jonathan Marks
- Inker(s): Jason Gorder, Jonathan Marks
- Colorist: Beth Sotelo

Shrugged is a comic series published by Aspen MLT. It was written and created by Frank Mastromauro and Aspen founder Michael Turner, and drawn by Micah Gunnell. The story explores the premise that every human being has a shoulder angel and shoulder devil, who are in fact representatives from the opposing cities of Elysia and Nefario in a dimension called Perspecta, and influence their assigned human at every decision. The central character, Theo, has the unique ability to consciously perceive his Perspectans, named Ange and Dev.

Having begun in May 2006, Shrugged faced ongoing delays due to co-creator Michael Turner's struggle with cancer. Turner died in mid-2008, with Shrugged completing its eight-issue run in January 2009. It was collected in trade paperback in late February-early March 2009. A second volume, this time a six-issue limited series written solely by Mastromauro and drawn by Jonathan Marks, was published in 2013-2018.
