= Gears of War (comics) =

Comic book series

- Cover for the first volume

Publication information
- Publisher: Wildstorm
- Schedule: Bi-Monthly
- Genre: Military science fiction
- Publication date: December 2008 – August 2012
- No. of issues: 24

Creative team
- Written by: Joshua Ortega
- Artist(s): Hollow; Liam Sharp
- Penciller(s): The Quickening; Simon Bisley
- Inker(s): The Quickening; Henry Flint
- Letterer: Wes Abbott
- Colorist: Jonny Rench
- Editor(s): Ben Abernathy; Kristy Quinn

Collected editions
- Hardcover: ISBN 1-4012-2520-9

Gears of War is a series of comic books set in the Gears of War universe. The story takes place between Gears of War and Gears of War 2.

== Publication history ==
Epic Games and DC Comics announced on April 17, 2008, that a comic book based on Gears of War would be published. The comic is published under DC's Wildstorm imprint and is written by Joshua Ortega, with art by Liam Sharp. The first storyline "Hollow" ran from Gears of War #1-6 and was followed by "The Quickening" with pencils by Simon Bisley and inks by Henry Flint. Sharp, Flint, Joel Gomez and Trevor Hairsine provided the art for the single issue "Harper's Story" in issue #8, before Sharp returned for the multi-issue storyline "Barren" starting in Gears of War #9.

In addition to the main comic series there is The Gears of War: Sourcebook issue, which holds a collection of images from artists from the comic book industry. The issue also contains a story from Joshua Ortega titled "One Day", which focuses on the inner struggle of Dominic Santiago.

== Plot ==
=== "Hollow" ===
In this comic books series, Marcus Fenix is training a new recruit, Jayson "Jace" Stratton. Delta Squad, composed of Marcus, Dom, Jace and Gil, is searching the Badlands for lost squads. They find another Gear, Corporal Michael Barrick of Echo Six. The rest of the members in the squad had been KIA. They set up camp and Dom and Marcus tell war stories to the other squad members. In the morning they encounter some locust drones. Gil gets seriously wounded just before two boomers arrive. While the rest of the squad takes out the enemy, Gil dies in Jace's arms. Jace recalls his own brother dying in his arms, but unlike then, Jace cannot shed a tear. The squad returns to Jacinto for a week's break. Dom and Anya meet, and Dom tells her that he appreciates the fact that she looked for his wife Maria. Anya then proceeds to meet Marcus Fenix in a bar. Two tough guys try to pick up Anya in a rough manner but Marcus hurts them to get them off. Once they find out who Marcus is, they lay off for good. The week is up and Dom, Marcus and Jace head out to find out that Michael Barrick is now in their squad.

=== "The Quickening" ===
During the invasion of his home Island, Tai Kaliso fought Indie soldiers in the jungle. After witnessing his village being cleansed by the UIR, Tai recognizes he has nothing to live for and ran into a member of the 26th Royal Tyran infantry. That same Gear, Marcus Fenix, invited Tai to fight for the COG, since he wanted him to be on the winning side. Years later Tai, along with the 26th, was fighting in Aspho Fields. Tai easily killed an Indie and mortally wounded another, giving comfort to the dying soldier but using his body as a Meat Shield after his death. Many years later, after the Lightmass Offensive, Tai explains to Jace that life is sacred. Later, during the Assault on Landown, Rig D77 is destroyed by Tickers but Tai was able to survive. He then joined up with Delta-One. Hours later Tai and Dizzy engaged Skorge in a melee combat. Realizing Skorge could not be beaten, he ordered Dizzy to escape. Tai was captured by the Locust, and "processed". After hours of torture, Tai's soul was ready to leave his body, and when Delta rescued him Tai took his own life.

=== "Harper's Story" ===
In the comic, Jonathan Harper tells his own story. His story begins as his squad cheers on as the train carrying the Lightmass Bomb took off. Later, Jonathan tells how he and his squad witnessed the bombing and thought it was beautiful. When he states the Locust were not completely wiped out, he stated a new threat emerged, Rust Lung. He said several soldiers were tested for a disease called Rust Lung. Vivian Merriweather told Jon he did not have Rust Lung, but he was unable to handle fighting which Jon took offense of. He was later given medicine. He was sent down into the hollows for Operation Hollow Storm. He was later captured and got very ill. He escaped the prison he was captured in, the same one as Maria's, and rescued a family evacuating out of Jacinto.

=== "Barren" ===
Following a distress signal from the overrun city of Jilane, Delta Squad is dispatched to investigate with the help of a unique "scout" named Alex. The team, with the help of Sigma Squad, explores one of the darker elements of the Gears of War universe. Series writer Joshua Ortega is joined by Epic Games president Mike Capps.

=== "Midnight" ===
This issue is focused on Jace Stratton and explores his younger years. Fresh out of basic training, Jace is thrust into an operation that proves anything but routine.

== Reception ==
Weekly Comic Book Review thought that "[t]he art, dialogue, and story all do a wonderful job of using the atmosphere and characters to great effect" although they wonder about the depth and how the comic would work for someone not familiar with the game. On issue #2 they felt that the "artwork effectively brings the violence and war-torn environments to the page" and the dialogue is "standard tough-guy, action movie stereotype type stuff, but it is what I expected and (in some ways) hoped for," concluding that "the book delivers the Gears of War experience pretty well " Comics Bulletin also wonders about the audience the series is aiming for as it will appeal to fans of the game who are also readers of comics, but they feel that it is not accessible enough for general readers.

Benjamin Birdie reviewed the second issue for Comic Book Resources, having not picked up the first issue because he had concluded, from a quick flick through, that the art was a "sloppily inked, chunky disaster." However, once he read the second issue, he had to change his mind, saying "Liam Sharp's work, when you sit down and read it, works absolutely perfectly in the context of the book" and concludes that " it's a strange artist who, from a slight distance can look so unappealing, but when you allow yourself to step into the world they've created turns out to be incredibly talented." He suggests Ortega does a "fairly decent job" with the dialogue but the story delivered what is required, "Gears, and Ortega in this comic, does best is creating gripping set pieces of conflict and violence."

== Collected editions ==
The series was collected into separate volumes:

- Gears of War Book One (160 pages, Wildstorm, hardcover, Collects Gears of War #1-6, November 2009, ISBN 1-4012-2520-9)
- Gears of War Book Two (176 pages, Wildstorm, hardcover, Collects Gears of War #7-13, February 2011, ISBN 1-4012-2801-1)
- Gears of War Book Three (256 pages, Wildstorm, hardcover, Collects Gears of War #14-24, January 2013, ISBN 978-1-4012-3695-3)
