= J. T. Krul =

American comic book writer

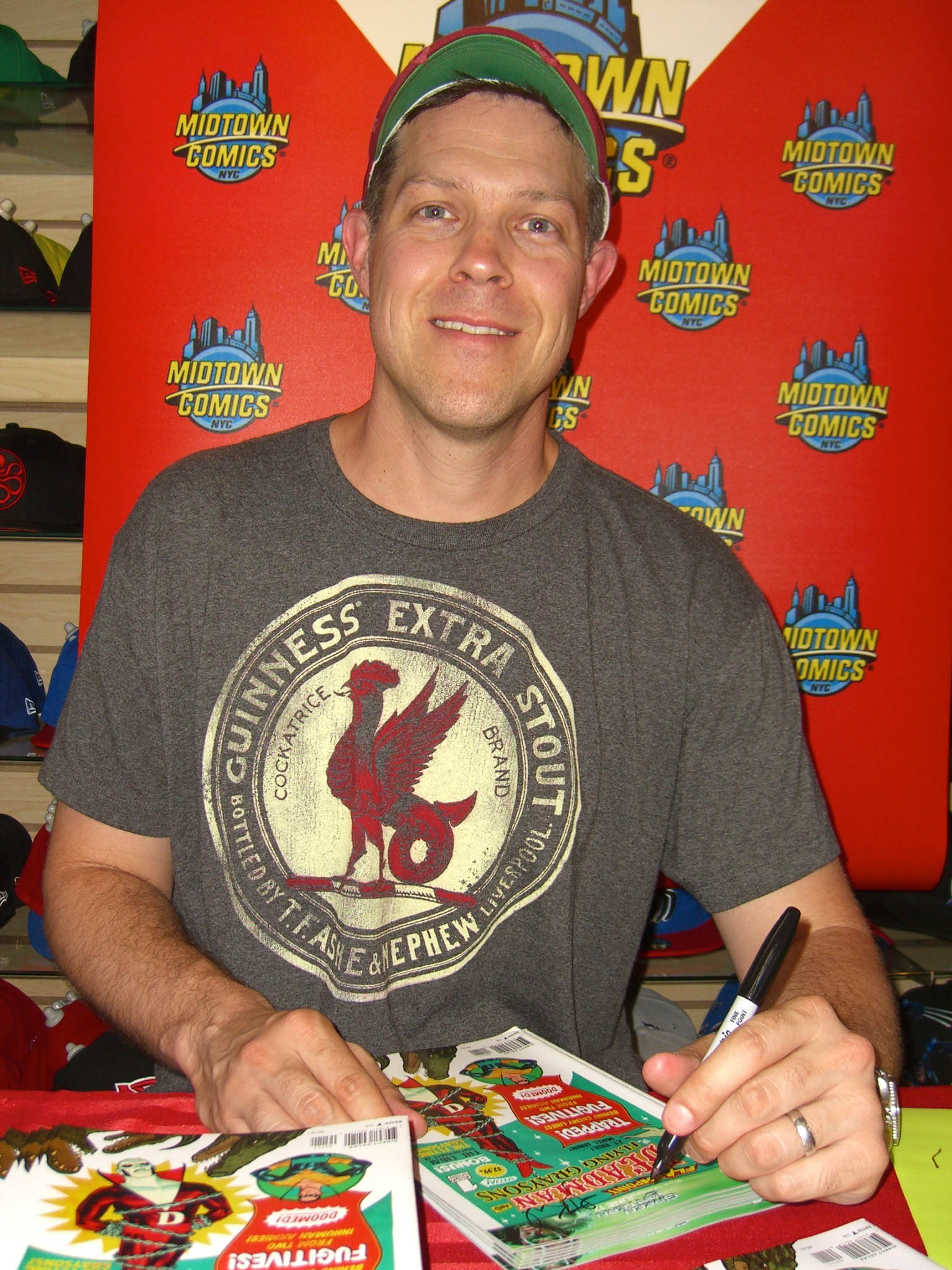
- Krul at a signing for Teen Titans #97 at Midtown Comics in Manhattan, July 13, 2011.
- Born: Jeffrey T. Krul; November 14, 1972 (age 54) Michigan
- Area: Writer
- Notable works: Fathom

Jeffrey T. Krul (born November 14, 1972, in Michigan) is an American comic book writer, best known for his work on Aspen MLT's Fathom comic series.

== Early life ==
J.T. Krul was born and raised in Michigan. He received a Bachelor's degree in Film and Video Production from Michigan State University.

== Career ==
Krul moved to Los Angeles in 1996, where he landed the job of production assistant on the TV show Seinfeld. He was promoted to the position of the show's production coordinator in its last season.

J.T. Krul's first comic book work was at Marvel Comics, writing X-Men Unlimited and later, Spider-Man Unlimited. He subsequently went to work for Michael Turner's company, Aspen MLT, writing their flagship titles Fathom and Soulfire. He then launched a creator-owned comic book there called Mindfield, which debuted in 2010.

In 2008 Krul wrote Past Experience, a Heroes comic book story starring characters from the NBC TV series of the same name. That same year, he wrote the third book in the Joker's Asylum series of one-shots, which featured Poison Ivy.

Other books he has written for DC Comics include several issues of Teen Titans and Titans, including Blackest Night: Titans, the tie-in to DC's 2009–2010 "Blackest Night" crossover storyline. In 2009 Krul wrote Justice League: The Rise and Fall, and Justice League: The Rise of Arsenal and later took over the Green Arrow series with issue #31 (May 2010), with a storyline titled "The Fall of Green Arrow". After four issues a new volume of Green Arrow was launched with a new #1 with Krul writing. He returned to Teen Titans as the main writer.

As part of DC Comics' The New 52 relaunch in 2011, Krul wrote Green Arrow and Captain Atom. He left Green Arrow after issue #3 due to time pressures but continued to write Captain Atom.

Krul has written for Dynamite Entertainment's books including Red Sonja and Highlander: Way of the Sword.

== Personal life ==
Krul lives in Southern California with his wife and their two daughters.

== Bibliography ==
=== Aspen MLT ===
- Aspen Seasons: Fall 2005 #1 (2005)
- Aspen Seasons: Spring 2005 #1 (2005)
- Fathom vol. 2 #0–8 (2005–2006)
- Fathom vol. 3 #0–10 (2008–2010)
- Fathom Beginnings #1 (2005)
- Fathom: Cannon Hawke #0–5 (2004–2006)
- Fathom: Cannon Hawke: Prelude #1 (2005)
- Fathom Prelude #1 (2005)
- Jirni #1 (2013)
- Michael Turner's Cannon: Dawn of War #0–3 (2004)
- Soulfire #3–10 (2005–2009)
- Soulfire: Chaos Reign #0–3 (2006–2007)
- Soulfire: Dying Of The Light #0–5 (2005–2006)
- Worlds of Aspen #1–4 (2006–2009)

=== DC Comics ===
- The Adventures of Superman vol. 2 #6 (2013)
- Batman Beyond Unlimited #3–17 (2012–2013)
- Blackest Night: Titans #1–3 (2009)
- Bloodlines #1–4 (2016)
- Captain Atom vol. 4 #1–12, #0 (2011–2012)
- Flashpoint: Deadman and the Flying Graysons #1–3 (2011)
- G.I. Combat vol. 2 #1–4, #0 ("The War that Time Forgot") (2012)
- Green Arrow vol. 4 #30–31 (2010)
- Green Arrow vol. 5 #1–12 (2010–2011)
- Green Arrow vol. 6 #1–3 (2011–2012)
- Heroes #2 (2009)
- The Joker's Asylum: "Poison Ivy" #1 (2008)
- JSA: Classified #23–24 (2007)
- Teen Titans vol. 3 #77–78, 88–100 (2010–2011)
- Titans vol. 2 #15, 19, 21–22 (2009–2010)
- Untold Tales of Blackest Night #1 (2010)

=== Dynamite Entertainment ===
- Highlander: Way of the Sword (2007–2008)
- The Owl #1–4 (2013)
- Red Sonja #7 (2006)

=== Marvel Comics ===
- Spider-Man Unlimited #2 (2004)
- X-Men Unlimited #1 (2004)

=== ZMX Comics / Aspen Comics ===
- Nu Way #1–5 (2018–2019)

Preceded by Felicia D. Henderson	Teen Titans writer 2009	Succeeded by Felicia D. Henderson
Preceded by Felicia D. Henderson	Teen Titans writer 2010–2011	Succeeded by Scott Lobdell
Preceded by Andrew Kreisberg	Green Arrow writer 2010–2012	Succeeded by Keith Giffen and Dan Jurgens
Preceded by Adam Beechen	Batman Beyond Unlimited writer 2012–2013	Succeeded by Adam Beechen
