= Fathom (comics) =

Comic book created by Michael Turner

- Textless cover of Fathom #1 (August 1998); Art by Michael Turner and Joe Weems

Publication information
- Publisher: Image (1998–2002); Aspen Comics (2003–present)
- Schedule: Monthly
- Format: Ongoing series
- Publication date: (Vol. 1); August 1998 – May 2002 (Vol. 2); April 2005 – December 2006 (Vol. 3); June 2008 – February 2010 (Vol. 4); June 2011 – May 2013 (Vol. 5); July 2013 – September 2014 (Vol. 6); February 2017 – September 2017 (Vol. 7); July 2018 – present
- No. of issues: (Vol. 1): 16 (plus #0 and #½) (Vol. 2): 12 (Vol. 3): 11 (Vol. 4): 10 (Vol. 5): 8 (Vol. 6): 8 (Vol. 7): 8
- Main character: Aspen Matthews

Creative team
- Created by: Michael Turner
- Written by: (Vol. 1); Michael Turner, Bill O'Neil (Vol. 2); J.T. Krul (Vol. 3) (Vol. 4); Scott Lobdell (Vol. 6); Blake Northcott (Vol. 7); Ron Marz
- Penciller(s): (Vol. 1); Michael Turner (Vol. 2); Koi Turnbull (Vol. 3); Alé Garza (Vol. 4); Alex Konat (Vol. 6); Marco Renna (Vol. 7); Siya Oum
- Inker(s): (Vol. 1); Joe Weems, Sal Regla (Vol. 6); Mark Roslan
- Colorist(s): (Vol. 1); Jonathan Smith, Peter Steigerwald (Vol 6); John Starr

Fathom is a comic book created by Michael Turner and originally published by Top Cow Productions. It debuted in 1998 and was Michael Turner's first creator-owned comic book series. Fathom is currently published by Turner's own company, Aspen MLT.

Its protagonist is Aspen Matthews, a member of a race of aquatic humanoids called the Blue who possess the ability to control water.

== Publication history ==
Fathom was created by Michael Turner, who said that he found the inspiration from an issue of National Geographic. The first series began in 1998 and was abruptly halted in 2002 when it was discovered that Turner had been diagnosed with cancer. During the period of inactivity on the main series, comic book artist Talent Caldwell drew a miniseries titled Fathom: Killian's Tide. After Turner's cancer went into remission, he left Top Cow and launched his own company, Aspen MLT Inc. During this period there was a legal conflict between Turner and Top Cow as to who owned the rights to Fathom.

In 2004, Turner restarted the Fathom series and had a preview of its premiere in his company's first comic, Michael Turner Presents: Aspen. After that, a Fathom miniseries titled Fathom: Dawn of War was produced and, shortly after that, the series Fathom: Cannon Hawke was started. The second volume in the Fathom series was drawn by artist Koi Turnbull. The third Fathom series was drawn by artist Ale Garza and inked by Sal Regla. In 2017, Fathom got a sixth volume, this time written by Blake Northcott, pencilled by Marco Renna and inked by Mark Roslan.

Dynamite Entertainment also did a Fathom: Prelude one-shot, which was co-published with Aspen MLT.

== Fathom (1998–2002) ==
Fathom begins as the cruise ship Paradise arrives in San Diego 10 years after its disappearance had been reported. A military quarantine is established to cross-examine the crew and passengers; however, no one on board is aware that they had been missing. Compounding the mystery is a little girl who had been discovered by the crew while still at sea. The girl could only remember that her name was Aspen. Aspen is taken from the ship by a vacationing naval officer, Captain Matthews, who adopts her and raises her as his own. Aspen has a strange attraction to water, and spends much of her youth swimming, eventually making the US Olympic team for the 1988 Seoul games. She wins the gold, but has her medal taken away and receives a permanent ban after she fails a rigged drug test. Afterwards, Aspen attends UC San Diego and receives a degree in Marine Biology. She is then invited to study at a top-secret underwater science facility known as the DMD, or Deep Marine Discovery. The DMD is a joint project between the United States and Japan. The facility was built over a strange underwater craft of unknown origin which both nations study to determine its origin. However, the Americans and Japanese no longer trust each other and rely on an intermediary named Cannon Hawke to share research data. Aspen is also introduced to a mysterious man who somehow entered the DMD and requested to be placed into a tube filled with water. He requires no air, leading the DMD to deduce that, despite his appearance, he is not human.

A US Navy test pilot named Chance Calloway is testing an experimental amphibious fighter plane for Admiral Maylander, who heads Naval Intelligence. Maylander is also the man who oversaw the quarantine of the Paradise. Chance's wingman is killed by a craft resembling the one at the DMD. Violating orders, Chance pursues the craft, first in the air and then underwater. Again disobeying orders, he fires a torpedo at the craft only to have it dissolve into the water before the torpedo reaches its target. Without a target, the torpedo locks onto the generator at the DMD and destroys it, severely damaging the facility. Before she drowns, Aspen is rescued by the man in the tube who springs to life and attempts to take her with him. He begins to dissolve into the water, just like the alien craft, and Aspen begins to dissolve as well. Naval rescue teams arrive and the man flees: Aspen is rescued, but not before Calloway sees her in a half-dissolved form. He goes AWOL to try to find Aspen and figure out what he saw. He eventually finds Aspen, who cannot explain her abilities. Before she can find out any more, she is abducted by government personnel and brought to Killian who is held in the DMD. He tells Aspen that she is a member of a race of aquatic humanoids called the Blue who possess the ability to control water.

=== Blue Sun ===
Aspen enters the world of the Blue with Killian training her to be a warrior. Aspen has unique powers, even for the Blue, and Killian tricks her into helping him create an enormous weapon. This weapon, later called the "Blue Sun", is a huge ball of energy out in space powered by three underwater stations on Earth. Killian intends to use this weapon to drill a hole in the Earth's crust at a place known to the Blue as Chanarnay, or the "Valley of Stairs". This hole would drain much of the world's oceans although the purpose is not fully known except to Killian.

Before Killian can accomplish this, Aspen is convinced by her new friend Kyla to leave Killian and escape with Cannon Hawke, a member of the Blue himself, who has been following Aspen for years to prevent Killian from using her to activate the Blue Sun. Kyla is an agent of Cannon's who was placed into Killian's group to collect intelligence on him. Killian nonetheless manages to get his plan in motion but not before Kyla reveals herself to Killian and helps Aspen escape, dying in the process. Aspen, Cannon and Chance follow Killian to Chanarnay where Cannon fights Killian to buy time for Aspen to stop the Blue Sun. Cannon is wounded and Killian throws Aspen into a light beam and thinks he has killed her. Aspen in fact has gained near god-like abilities from the raw energy of the beam. She then kills Killian and destroys the beam.

=== The Spelunker ===
After the Blue Sun incident, Aspen finally gets some rest, or so she thinks. After strange deaths occur from the jaws of an unknown sea creature, a crazy old man shows up at Aspen's door. The man brings her aboard the Spelunker, a strange submarine-like vessel, and in a very Moby-Dick-like fashion, they hunt down the creature named "Big Moe".

Aspen ends up killing two of the unknown sea creatures after finding Big Moe to be their parent. Big Moe gets away and the old man and Aspen part ways. The old man has since appeared in a single issue of Aspen Seasons as a possible foreshadow for his and the Spelunker's eventual return to the series.

=== Resurrection of Taras ===
Around a year after the Blue Sun event, Cannon finds himself on his yacht with Lara Croft, an archaeologist and adventurer. While relaxing, he is attacked and kidnapped by Biranha, the brother of Taras. Lara goes unnoticed and contacts her friend Sara Pezzini, a New York detective and wielder of the Witchblade, for help.

Cannon awakes in an underwater city in the Atlantic. He is being held hostage by Vana, leader of the Arctic Blue, and mother of Biranha and Taras. The Arctic Blue are a separate sect of the Blue living in the freezing cold north and have adapted abilities to control ice. Vana wants revenge on Cannon for the near death of her son. It turns out that Taras was not actually killed in the Blue Sun but rather evaporated to a large degree. Vana uses a machine to try to place Taras' remains into Cannon so that Taras might live again in Cannon's body.

Meanwhile, Sara and Lara begin searching for clues as to where Cannon might have been taken when they run into Aspen. At the same time, Aspen is being targeted by Biranha's men. Aspen and Sara end up working together only to be knocked out and kidnapped. They awaken in the underwater city below the Atlantic Ocean. It turns out Vana also blames Aspen for what has happened to her son and wishes to see Aspen dead. Thankfully Lara is still free and on the way to rescue the women, having followed Biranha's team home.

Vana's experiment comes to a saddening end when Cannon absorbs all of Taras and turns into a horrible abomination, a mere shadow of a man that can barely speak. Vana intends to kill this haunting image of Cannon, believing her son fully lost, until Taras' mind bleeds through, forcing Cannon to say, "I learned to walk before I could crawl". Realizing Taras is still in Cannon's body, Vana tries to undo the experiment, hopefully getting things right this time. As this is going on, Lara sneaks in and frees Aspen and Sara. The trio of women leave the base only to return, realizing they must free Cannon at all costs.

This time, Vana's experiment works, bringing Cannon back to his normal self as well as recreating Taras' body. However, when Sara and Lara break into the chamber, a fight ensues. During this, Sara is in her own fight, facing and killing Biranha. Vana and Aspen exchange blasts of ice and water until Vana shoots one directly at Aspen. Rather than dodge it, Aspen reflects the blast by turning her arms into a form of hard water. The blast ricochets off Aspen's arms and blows up the capsule Taras was in, killing him. The girls grab Cannon and run as Vana makes a desperate suicidal final move. It is a race against time for them to get out of the enemy base as Vana explodes her body into hundreds of long sharp icicles. The group manages to escape to Cannon's yacht, and they relax after such a dangerous adventure.

Cannon did not leave Vana's headquarters without cost. As he looks in the mirror he sees Taras smiling back at him as he is now stuck in the deep recesses of his subconscious.

This was the last storyline of the first volume of Fathom, as well as the last Fathom story to be published through Top Cow Productions.

==== Legal changes ====
Due to legal restrictions in using the Top Cow characters from Tomb Raider and Witchblade, The Fathom, Vol. 1: The Definitive Edition contains a re-engineered version of this story which removes the characters of Lara and Sara, and re-focuses the story on Aspen's character only.

== Fathom (2005–present) ==
=== Aspen ===
The Michael Turner Presents: Aspen mini-series marks the final Fathom story drawn by creator Michael Turner. The three-issue series introduces the new characters of Kiani, Casque, Brande, and Siphon. It also introduces "the Black", a brother species to the Blue. At the end of the series, the Black kidnap Aspen and bring her to the bottom of the ocean. This acts as a precursor to Fathom: Dawn of War

=== Dawn of War ===
Fathom: Dawn of War bridges the gap between the original series and Fathom vol. 2. The story focuses on the Blue warrior Kiani, who is forced to side with the rebellious councilman Marqueses in order to save her master, Casque, from the clutches of human military scientists. Marqueses has engineered the situation in order to kidnap Casque and to secure the older warrior's immense power for an offensive against the humans. Kiani tracks down Marqueses and saves Casque only to find he is part of the Black. The Black come for Casque, and he is forced to rejoin them, leaving Kiani angry and lost.

Dawn of War emphasizes Kiani's loneliness and character development. It also introduces audiences further to the underwater world of the Blue.

=== Fathom Prelude and Beginnings ===
Fathom Prelude and Fathom Beginnings were two one-shot stories from 2005 that gave glimpses into Aspen's past.

Fathom Prelude showed Aspen's teenage life and her journey with the USA Olympic Swimming team. The story sheds some light on why she was stripped of her gold medal and includes a possible appearance by the Unknown.

Fathom Beginnings shows Aspen's first appearance on the cruise ship Paradise. More clues are given as to the identity of the Unknown and the reasons for his physical state.

=== Fathom vol. 2 ===
Fathom vol. 2 primarily focuses on the developments between the American government and the Blue. Volume 1 revealed that Admiral Maylander knew of the Blue's presence, and this series sees him take action against the underwater race. He does so by a sneak attack on the Blue city of Saba. Aspen, kidnapped by the Black, meets her father, Rahger, and learns that she is also part of the Black.

=== Cannon Hawke ===
The Fathom: Cannon Hawke mini-series ran parallel with the first few issues of Fathom vol. 2. They detailed Cannon's exile from the Blue as well as his fight with Taras.

=== Fathom vol. 3 ===
Fathom vol. 3 was drawn by Fathom newcomer Ale Garza. This time, the focus is divided between the returning Killian, thought dead in volume 2, his newfound allegiance with his abandoned daughter, Kiani, and the rise of the Blue's ancestor race the Black.

=== Fathom: Blue Descent ===
Fathom: Blue Descent is a 5-issue mini-series published in 2010. The series was written by David Schwartz. Art for the zero issue was provided by Scott Clark, with Alex Sanchez stepping in for the art on issues #1–4. Covers were drawn by Clark and Sanchez, and also David Finch, Billy Tan, Joe Benitez, Nick Bradshaw, and Michael Turner. The series reveals Aspen Matthews' secret, formerly hidden past. It introduces new characters in Aspen's parents, Eilah and Abesaloma, and their childhood friend, Zo. It also features many returning characters, such as Aspen, Finn, Cannon, Killian, and the Black.

=== Fathom vol. 4 ===
Fathom vol. 4 was drawn by Alex Konat and written by Scott Lobdell. In this volume, Aspen joins with new allies, faces new enemies and discovers the mysterious Church of the Eternal Depths. This time, Aspen must deal with the global ramifications of the Blue and Black's exposure to the rest of the world.

=== Fathom: The Elite Saga ===
Fathom: The Elite Saga is a 5-issue mini-series published in 2013. The series was written by Vince Hernandez along with J.T. Krul and David Wohl. In the series, Aspen is attempting to find solace above the surface by distancing herself from the demons of her past. The series also shows returning characters including Killian and Kiani. Killian is in search of his missing wife Anya, and his newborn child Anika while Kiani escapes from her imprisonment to get her revenge on Aspen. The series also serves as a celebration and culmination of 15 years of "Fathom."

=== Fathom vol. 5 ===
Fathom vol. 5, also known as All New Fathom, published 2013–2014, shows Aspen battles the return of the Arctic Blue and shows Anya's daughter, Anika all grown up raised by the resurrected Vana. Aspen teams up with Killian and Chance to prevent the Arctic Blue's plot to bring a frozen apocalypse on Earth and must prevent them from attacking Muria, the Blues' capital city.

=== Fathom vol. 6 ===
Fathom vol. 6, also known as Michael Turner's All New Fathom, published since February 2017, includes an all new creative team; Blake Northcott (writer), Marco Renna (pencils), Mark Roslan (digital inks), John Starr (colors) and Zen (letters). In this volume, Aspen Matthews inadvertently releases a group of incarcerated underwater beings called The Typhos, who are bent on overthrowing The Blue. Her identity is also exposed to the human world, forcing her into hiding.

=== Fathom vol. 7 ===
Fathom vol. 7, also known as Michael Turner's All New Fathom, published in June 2018, included a new creative team of writer Ron Marz (Green Lantern, Witchblade) and artist Siya Oum (Lola XOXO). The next adventure for Aspen's hero sees her attempt to navigate an ever-changing world where The Blue are not only present above the surface, but are exploited in new and dangerous ways. When a rival nation to The States decides to take control of the global landscape by tapping into the power of The Blue, Aspen Matthews discovers that a new adversary has risen to challenge the notion that she is the most powerful person on the planet and humanity may suffer the consequences.

== Characters ==
- Aspen Matthews – Main protagonist.
- Chance Calloway – Aspen's boyfriend.
- Admiral James Maylander – An admiral in the US Navy who declares war on the Blue, although is defeated by Aspen.
- Cannon Hawke – Aspen's guardian with the Blue, and Commander of the Elite Council Defense Strike Force. He was killed by Kiani in the final stages of the Black invasion; prompting Aspen to retaliate and (temporarily) destroy Kiani.
- Siphon – A member of the Elite Council Defense Strike Force and son of ex-Council member Kinzin. Siphon takes his father's place on the Council. He later ascends to become leader of the Blue Council.
- Killian – A rogue Blue leader and ardent enemy of mankind, originally an enemy of Aspen. Later he joins the Blue government under Siphon and becomes Commander of the Elite Guard under Siphon's command.
- Anya – The secret lover of Killian and mother of Kiani and Anika. Later after Siphon leaves behind his revolutionary ways their relationship becomes public knowledge, the two marry and have a second daughter, Anika.
- Kiani – Killian and Anya's headstrong, violent and completely immoral daughter and a member of the Elite Council Defense Strike Force. Later she joins Killian's attacks on the Earth, and continued on after Killian stood down. Kiani refused to listen to reason and continued on, ultimately leading her to kill Cannon and battle Aspen. Ultimately, Aspen defeated Kiani, whereby she disintegrated, apparently dying. Kiani somehow survived from Aspen's power and briefly resurfaced to locate her kidnapped infant sister, Anika. When she (apparently) dies due to her violent attempts to intervene, Kiani is consumed with guilt and goes into self-imposed exile.
- Anika/Kania – The youngest daughter of both Killian and Anya and sister of Kiani. Vana also raises her as Kania after the event of the Elite Saga.
- Brande – A member of the Elite Council Defense Strike Force and best friend of Siphon and Kiani. He dies during Maylander's attack.
- Vana – Leader of the "Arctic Blue" and mother of Taras and Biranha. She is a scientific genius who is the enigmatic leader of the Blue's arctic settlement, and has a reputation of being nominally eccentric. After both her sons die due to Killian, she later gains vengeance by taking Anika, Killian's infant second daughter, and transforming her into Kania – who sees her as her mother.
- Taras – A male "Arctic Blue" warrior, brother of Biranha, and Killian's lieutenant. He dies, along with his brother, serving with Killian.
- Biranha – A male "Arctic Blue" warrior and brother of Taras. He dies, along with his brother, serving with Killian.
- Judith Banyaski – Aspen's friend and personal assistant.
- Colin Woreth – Aspen's friend, personal assistant and former teacher.
- Akiko Nigata – Cannon's personal assistant and friend.
- Tyler Kincaid – Aspen's roommate and a television news anchor.
- Thassalar – Leader of the recently bombed city of Saba — Thassalar has helped Cannon and the Council Strike force to oppose Biranha.
- Mysterious Blue/Finn – A translucent Blue stuck in a semi-water state and Aspen's older brother.
- Casque – A member of the Black, but also a friend of Cannon and Kiani's mentor.
- Rahger – Biological father of Aspen and leader of the Black — a more powerful underwater race than that of the Blue. Ragher met Aspen, but was unable to convince her to join his people's efforts to destroy mankind. Undeterred, he continued his war preparations hoping that Aspen will eventually join him. His invasion fails when Aspen stands against and defeats him.

== Collected editions ==
Title	Material collected	Publication date	ISBN
Fathom Collected Editions, Vol. 1	Fathom #0–1; Fathom Preview	March 1999	1-5824-0088-1
Fathom Collected Editions, Vol. 2	Fathom #2–3	March 1999	1-5824-0105-5
Fathom Collected Editions, Vol. 3	Fathom #4–5	November 1999	1-5824-0118-7
Fathom Collected Editions, Vol. 4	Fathom #6–7	December 1999	1-5824-0115-2
Fathom Collected Editions, Vol. 5	Fathom #8–9	April 2000	
Fathom, Vol. 1	Fathom #0–9, #½	May 2002	1-58240-210-8
Fathom: Killian's Tide	Fathom: Killian's Tide #1–4	May 2002	978-1840234541
Aspen: The Extended Edition (From the Depths They Rise)	Michael Turner Presents: Aspen #1–3	January 2005	
Fathom: The Definitive Edition	Fathom: Preview; Fathom #½, 0–11; excerpts from Fathom #12–14; Fathom Swimsuit Special #1–2; Aspen: The Extended Edition	November 2008	978-0-9774821-5-3
Fathom: Dawn of War: The Complete Saga	Fathom: Dawn of War #0–3; Fathom: Cannon Hawke: Dawn of War #1	June 2004	978-0-9823628-2-2
Fathom, Vol. 2: Into the Deep	Fathom Beginnings; Fathom vol. 2, #0–11	June 2008	978-0-9774821-3-9
Fathom: Kiani, Vol. 1: Blade of Fire	Fathom: Kiani #0–4	June 2009	978-0-9774821-8-4
Fathom, Vol. 3: Worlds at War	Fathom Prelude; Fathom vol. 3, #0–10	June 2008	978-0-9774821-9-1
Fathom: Killian's Tide	Fathom: Killian's Tide #1–4; Fathom: Killian's Vessel #1	September 2015	1941511007
Fathom: Blue Descent	Fathom: Blue Descent #0–4	June 2010	
Fathom, Vol. 4	Fathom Vol. 4 #0–9	June 2011	
Fathom: Elite Saga	Fathom: Elite Saga #1–5	June 2013	
Fathom, Vol. 5; AKA: All New Fathom	All New Fathom #1–8	July 2013	
All New Fathom, Vol. 6	All New Fathom #1–8	February 2017	
All New Fathom, Vol. 7	All New Fathom #1–8	June 2018	

== Movie adaptation ==
In June 1999, it was reported that Fox Animation Studios was in the process of developing an animated film adaptation of Fathom with a budget ranging from $30-90 million and based on the first nine issue arc of the series. Creator Michael Turner stated the book's success spurred interest among many producers with some interested in adapting Fathom to live action for either a TV series or feature film, but Turner felt that a TV show wouldn't be able to effectively adapt the fantastical nature of the story and a live action film would be prohibitively expensive and was instrumental in Turner's decision to go with animation as the medium. Fox Animation Head Chris Meledandri stated the film would be PG-13 and aimed at a teenage audience. The project however never came to fruition due to the closure of Fox Animation Studios in the wake of the failure of Titan A.E..

In September 2001, it was reported that James Cameron's Lightstorm Entertainment had signed on to develop and produce a live action adaptation for 20th Century Fox with the studio having retooled the project from the shuttered Fox Animation Studios. Cameron reported signed on to the project as he liked the mixture of the dynamic female lead and the underwater environment. In June 2002, it was reported that Linda Woolverton had been hired to write the screenplay.

There has been a conflict with NBC's Surface (2005) television show. The TV show was named "Fathom" originally, but due to copyright infringement on the comic book name, the producers changed it at the last minute to the title "Surface".

In 2010, another movie adaptation of Fathom was under development by Fox Atomic, with Megan Fox signed up to play the role of Aspen Matthews and as a producer on the film. English actor Matthew Tate was to portray Chance Calloway. Screenwriter and video game creator Jordan Mechner was hired to write the script. Michael Turner, who created the series, was to be credited as the film's executive producer. The production of the movie met many difficulties, and at the moment it seems to be canceled.

An animated feature adaptation of Fathom is currently in development by Mythos Studios. The announcement was made during a panel at San Diego Comic-Con in 2018.
