= Soulfire (comics) =

- Art by Michael Turner and Peter Steigerwald.

Publication information
- Publisher: Aspen Comics
- First appearance: Aspen Sketchbook (February 2003)
- Created by: Michael Turner

In-story information
- Full name: Grace
- Partnerships: Malikai
Soulfire
- Cover for Soulfire #0, art by Michael Turner and Peter Steigerwald.
Publication information
- Publisher: Aspen MLT
- Schedule: Monthly
- Format: Ongoing series
- Genre: Fantasy comics
- No. of issues: (vol. 1): 11 (vol. 2): 10 (vol. 3): 8 (vol. 4): 8 (vol. 5):8 (vol. 6):8 (vol. 7):8 (vol. 8):6
Creative team
- Written by: (vol. 2-4); Jeph Loeb; J.T. Krul (vol. 2-4); J.T. Krul
- Penciller(s): (vol. 1); Michael Turner; Joe Benitez (vol. 2); Marcus To (vol. 3-4); Jason Fabok
- Inker(s): (vol. 2); Saleem Crawford; Richard Zajac
- Colorist(s): (vol. 1); Peter Steigerwald (vol. 2); Beth Sotelo (vol. 3); John Starr

Soulfire is a comic book produced by Aspen MLT that is one in a line of titles created by Michael Turner. The original characters were created between 2000 and 2002 with Soulfire (originally named Dragonfly) set to be produced under Top Cow, although that never came to be. Only when Michael Turner started his company, Aspen MLT, did the comic begin production in April 2003.

== Publication history ==
The Soulfire 'preview' issue was first printed in Wizard magazine #139 in March 2003. The preview introduced the two central protagonists of the story, Malikai and Grace.

== Plot summary ==
Soulfire is centered around the idea of "magic" being gone from the world. The story follows a boy named Malikai and a rag tag team of magical beings and cyborgs. Malikai's quest as the chosen one is to bring magic back to the hardened future of (2211 AD) and stop it from being used by evil.

== Storylines ==
=== Soulfire: Dying of the Light ===
A related comic limited series that sets the stage for the Soulfire series. It takes place in the end of the last era of magic where a disease is killing magical beings and parts of magic (such as the wings so many rely on in this era to fly).

=== Soulfire: Chaos Reign ===
A Soulfire limited series which takes place in primal times of the Soulfire universe, back when magic was still raw and untapped. It also led into the second volume of Soulfire, released in summer 2006. This is the second such series to spin out of the Soulfire limited series.

=== Soulfire: New World Order ===
While Soulfire is a limited series of 10 issues, it does not end there. It continues in the mini-series New World Order. New World Order is the bridge between Volume 1 and 2. It is 5 issues with a beginnings issue and number 0 issue. It is written by J.T. Krul with art by Francisco Herrera. Each issue also contains a Soulfire Vol. 2 backup story called Resurgence.

=== Soulfire: The Day the Magic Died ===
Countless ages ago, battles raged and wars were lost, but one lone heroine fought on. Struggling to prevent a time of magic and wonder from becoming extinct, her fight would span centuries, leading her to the one person who could help change the future forever. Introducing Grace, the startling and powerful Soulfire beauty, this bold epic tale sets the stage for the premiere of Soulfire #1 this summer. Contains 12 pages of brand-new story plus exclusive Soulfire source material, character sketches, layout designs, and all new Aspen updates.

=== Soulfire: The Definitive Edition ===
Magic is no longer a myth! This special Soulfire Volume One Collected Edition includes all nine issues of the Soulfire Volume One series from the team of Jeph Loeb and Michael Turner, and featuring artwork by Turner and Peter Steigerwald.

== Characters ==
=== Soulfire ===
- Malikai -- A young boy who is chosen to bring back magic to the world.
- Grace -- A winged female individual who plans on doing what is necessary to bring magic back to the world. She chooses Malikai to take on the task.
- Sonia -- Friend of Malikai who harbors a crush on him. According to creator Michael Turner, her hair changes colors with her mood.
- PJ -- Friend of Malikai. Many facial piercings and long, spiked hair. Sometimes acts as Mal's bodyguard (see issue #1).
- Benoist -- A warrior in the "Battle Pit" from whom Grace, Malikai, Sonia, and PJ seek help. Harbors a grudge against Rainier.
- Rainier -- Antagonist in the series. Responsible for the corruption of magic, also the one who created the mechanical dragon.
- Onyx -- A winged female mercenary who works for Rainier. We first see her when she attempts to kidnap Malikai.
- Dragon -- The destructive creation of Rainier.

=== Soulfire: Dying of the Light ===
- Mooncrest -- A dragon, friend of Grace. Later, Rainier takes control of him, forcing Grace to make a decision on her friend's life.
- Aglalia -- Grace's mother, seen in the preview issue at her own mother's side as she lay on her deathbed.
- Dex - A winged male, he is a strong brute who takes Faye to see the King's Magi upon her sudden illness. Later he aids Grace in seeking out a cure for the illness taking hold on the land.
- Faye -- a winged female like Grace, seen with Dex and later taken by him to see the King's Magi. Later she aids Grace in finding the answers to the illness falling upon the land.
- King Minas - King of Arcadia. Driven to paranoia by the illness taking over the land.
- Nala -- A winged female. Joined Dex in seeking out Troy, her partner, after he was escorted to see the Magi and had not returned for eight days.
- Troy -- Nala's life partner, a winged male. Was locked up for eight days after Nala took him to see the King's Magi. Later dies, a victim of the illness.
- Vinn -- Right-hand man of King Minas, was aware of his King's madness but could do nothing to help. Was responsible for locking up the Magi, Troy, and Faye. Later reveals he only did it for the sake of the kingdom, and aids Grace against Rainier.
- Septh - A winged man, a monk. Takes Grace to see Eyron, later falls pray to the illness that hits the land.
- Eyron the Dragon -- Ancient Dragon, said to have been present at the birth of magic. Knows the way magic works.
- Wellspring -- Dragon, friend of Faye's, saved her and the others, helping Grace from two other dragons. Later seen aiding Grace and the others against Ranier.
- General Zanis -- General under King Minas' command. Was ordered to attack king Ornoth since Minas presumed the illness and assassination attempt against him were from his kingdom.
- King Ornoth -- King of Delphora. Was blamed for poisoning the land of Arcadia by King Minas. Ornoth himself, however, was also a victim of the illness. Later he joins Zanis in fighting against Ranier.
- Lucivia -- Monk, speaks on behalf of Eyron, and later was tasked with hiding the era's existence from future generations.
- Halifax -- dragon, mother of Dandelion. Upon discovering she was dying she took her daughter to Eyron's mountain.
- Dandelion -- a young dragon, brought by her mother to the monks for protection. Later given to Seph to raise.
- Morlyn -- Winged male. Locked up by Vinn and later released to fight Ranier.

=== Soulfire: Chaos Reign ===
- Miya -- Female winged person. Though female, desired to learn to hunt and not follow traditional female roles within her tribe.
- Noris -- Father of Miya.
- Oshil -- Never seen but spoken of, Miya's brother killed by a panther.
- Delna -- Miya's mother. She protested against her husband's willingness to train their daughter in the ways of the hunt after the death of their son.Later was dragged off during the night.

== Collections ==
=== Trade paperbacks ===
Title	Material Collected	Publication Date	ISBN
Soulfire Volume 1 Part 1	Soulfire Preview, Soulfire vol. 1 #0, #1-5	April 2008	ISBN 097748212X
Soulfire Volume 1 Part 2	Soulfire vol. 1 #6-10	June 2010	ISBN 0982362811
Soulfire: Dying of the Light	Soulfire: Dying of the Light #0, #1-5	June 2007	ISBN 0977482111
Soulfire: Chaos Reign	Soulfire: Chaos Reign #0, #1-3	July 2008	ISBN 0977482146
Soulfire Volume 1: The Definitive Edition	Soulfire vol. 1 #0, #1-10	May 2012	ISBN 0982362862
Soulfire Volume 2: Dragon Fall	Soulfire vol. 2 #0, #1-9	April 2016	ISBN 098544732X
Soulfire Volume 3: Seeds of Chaos	Soulfire vol. 3 #0, #1-8	May 2017	ISBN 1941511139
Soulfire Volume 4: Dark Grace	Soulfire vol. 4 #1-8	May 2017	ISBN 1941511228
Soulfire Volume 5: Pandemonium	All New Soulfire #1-8	November 2017	ISBN 1941511309
Soulfire Volume 6: Future Shock	Soulfire vol. 6 #1-8	July 2018	ISBN 1941511376
Soulfire Volume 7: Overdrive	Soulfire vol. 7 #1-8	May 2019	ISBN 8892970240
Soulfire Volume 8: Battle of the Light	Soulfire vol. 8 #1-6	October 2020	ISBN 8892971883

== Movie adaptation ==
An animated feature adaptation of Soulfire is currently in development by Mythos Studios. The announcement was made during a panel at San Diego Comic-Con in 2018. The screenplay for Mythos' Soulfire is being penned by Bo Yeon Kim and Erika Lippoldt (Star Trek: Discovery, Reign). Also created by Turner, Soulfire made its debut within the pages of Wizard magazine in 2003, with Aspen publishing the title from then on out. Soulfire follows Malikai, an orphan who turns out to be the link to a forgotten age of music. Joined by a winged goddess named Grace, Malikai battles the dark lord of technology in an effort to return magic to the world.
