= Michael Turner (comics) =

American comics artist (1971–2008)

- Turner at his drawing board, as seen in the posthumous Soulfire #8 (April 2009)
- Born: Michael Layne Turner; April 21, 1971 Crossville, Tennessee, U.S.
- Died: June 27, 2008 (aged 37) Santa Monica, California, U.S.
- Areas: Writer, Penciller, Inker, Publisher
- Notable works: Fathom; Soulfire; Superman/Batman; Witchblade

Michael Layne Turner (April 21, 1971 – June 27, 2008) was an American comics artist known for his work on Witchblade, Fathom, Superman/Batman, Soulfire, and various covers for DC Comics and Marvel Comics. He was also the president of the entertainment company Aspen MLT.

== Early life ==
Michael Turner was born in Crossville, Tennessee on April 21, 1971. He was a student at the University of Tennessee, and graduated from the International Performing Arts Academy after which he moved to San Diego, California, where he developed an interest in comics.

== Career ==
Turner was discovered by Marc Silvestri at a convention and hired by Silvestri's Top Cow Productions as an artist. He initially did background illustrations for Top Cow titles before co-creating Witchblade. In the summer of 1998 he debuted the creator-owned Fathom, having also worked on his new series Soulfire.

As well as an artist, Turner was an award-winning water skier, held an instructor-level red sash in martial arts, and was an avid video game player. In March 2000, Turner was diagnosed with chondrosarcoma, a form of cancer, in the right pelvis. He was treated at the Ronald Reagan UCLA Medical Center with surgery in which he lost a hip, 40% of his pelvis, and three pounds of bone. The surgery was followed by nine months of radiation therapy.

Turner departed Top Cow in late 2002 to found his own comic book publishing company, Aspen MLT Inc. (where MLT stands for Michael Layne Turner), located in Santa Monica, with a studio in Marina del Rey, California. The release of comics from Aspen was delayed by a year-long lawsuit with Top Cow Productions over the rights to Fathom and over the rights to the unreleased titles Soulfire (initially called Dragonfly) and Ekos, both of which Turner had begun developing before leaving Top Cow and before his diagnosis of cancer. Aspen and Top Cow settled the lawsuit out of court in 2003.

In 2004 Turner contributed covers to various DC Comics titles, including The Flash and Identity Crisis. He provided cover art and co-wrote the "Godfall" story arc that ran in the three main Superman titles in early 2004 and illustrated the six-issue Supergirl story arc in Superman/Batman. His creator-owned title Soulfire began publication in 2004 and Fathom resumed publication in that year as well, though this time with Aspen MLT rather than Top Cow.

On August 6, 2005, Marvel Comics announced the signing of Michael Turner to a work-for-hire deal for a six-issue project and covers. This would turn out to be at least the variant covers for the miniseries Civil War and the Wolverine ongoing series Wolverine: Origins. In addition Turner had been announced as the artist on Ultimate Wolverine.

Turner created online comic adaptations for the NBC television series Heroes.

== Death and tribute ==
Turner died June 27, 2008, at the Santa Monica Hospital in Santa Monica, California, of complications from bone cancer. He is survived by his mother Grace Crick, his brother Jake Turner, and his fiancée Kelly Carmichael. Fathom vol. 3 #1, which was published on Wednesday, August 6, 2008, featured a tribute to Turner in the form of a stylized blue ribbon in the upper right-hand corner of its cover, and its first page was a memorial to him. Aspen MLT also published a trade paperback collection of writings from people who knew Turner, titled A Tribute to Michael Turner, which features a cover painted by Alex Ross. Volume #21 of The Boys included a page dedicated to Michael Turner as well.

== Bibliography ==
=== Interior art ===
==== Aspen MLT ====
- Soulfire #0–7 (2004–2005)

==== DC Comics ====
- Superman/Batman #8–13 (2004)

==== Image Comics/Top Cow Productions ====
- Ballistic #1–3 (1995)
- Codename: Strykeforce #14 (among other artists) (1995)
- Fathom #0–14 (1998–2002)
- Tomb Raider #25 (2002)
- Tomb Raider/Witchblade, one-shot, (with Brian Ching) #1 (1997)
- Witchblade #1–8, 10–23, 25 (1995–1998)
- Witchblade/Tomb Raider Special #1 (with Keu Cha)(1998)
- Wolverine/Witchblade #1 (1997)
- Witchblade/Elektra #1 (1997)

=== Covers ===
Variant incentive cover for Justice League of America #12 (October 2007)

==== Aspen MLT ====
- Fathom vol. 2, Beginnings, Prelude #0, 1–4, 7–8, 10–11 (2005–2006)
- Shrugged #0, 1–6 (2006–2007)
- Soulfire Preview, #0, 1–10 (2004–2009)

==== DC Comics ====
- Action Comics #812–813 (2004)
- The Adventures of Superman #625–626 (2004)
- The Flash vol. 2 #207–211 (2004)
- Identity Crisis #1–7 (2004)
- Justice League of America vol. 2 #0–12 (2006–2007)
- Supergirl vol. 5 #1–3, 5, 50 (2005)
- Superman vol. 2, #202–203, 205 (2004)
- Superman/Batman #8–13, 19, 26 (2006)
- Teen Titans vol. 3 #1 (2003)

==== Dynamite Entertainment ====
- Mercenaries #1–3 (2007)

==== Image Comics / Top Cow Productions ====
- Darkness #7, 11 (1997–1998)
- Tomb Raider #1, 9, 25, 46 (1999–2004)
- Witchblade #1–25, 27, 50, 86, 100, 103 (1995–2007)

==== Image Comics / Hurricane Ent. ====
- Violent Messiahs: Lamenting Pain #1 (2002)

==== Marvel Comics ====
- Black Panther vol. 4 #18, 23–25 (2006–2007)
- Civil War #1–7 (2006–2007)
- Fantastic Four #544–553 (2007)
- Hulk vol. 2 #1, 6 (2008)
- The Incredible Hulk vol. 3 #100 (2006)
- Ms. Marvel vol. 2 #1 (2006)
- Onslaught: Reborn #1 (2006)
- Spider-Man/Red Sonja #1–5 (2007)
- Sub-Mariner vol. 2 #1, 6 (2007–2008)
- Thor vol. 3 #1 (2007)
- Ultimate X-Men #75 (2006)
- Uncanny X-Men #500 (2008)
- World War Hulk #1 (2007)
- Wolverine: Origins #1 (2006)
- Wolverine vol. 3 #66 (2008)

Preceded by n/a	Witchblade penciller 1995–1998	Succeeded by Randy Green
Preceded by Pat Lee	Superman/Batman penciller 2004	Succeeded by Carlos Pacheco
