= Painkiller Jane (film) =

2005 film directed by Sanford Bookstaver

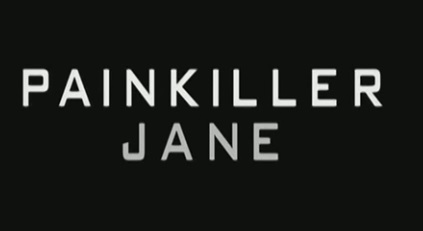
- Genre: Superhero
- Based on: Painkiller Jane by Jimmy Palmiotti; Joe Quesada
- Screenplay by: John Harrison; Don Keith Opper
- Story by: John Harrison; Don Keith Opper; Greg Gold
- Directed by: Sanford Bookstaver
- Starring: Emmanuelle Vaugier; Eric Dane; Richard Roundtree
- Music by: Brian Tyler
- Country of origin: United States
- Original language: English

Production
- Producer: Harvey Frand
- Cinematography: Stephen McNutt
- Editor: Andrew Seklir
- Running time: 82 minutes
- Production companies: Universal Television; MGM Television

Original release
- Network: Sci-Fi Channel
- Release: 10 December 2005

Painkiller Jane is a television superhero film based on the Event comic book character of the same name. It was first broadcast on the Sci-Fi Channel on 10 December 2005. The film stars Emmanuelle Vaugier as the eponymous heroine. The film differs significantly from the story of the comic book character. The movie was a backdoor pilot for a possible television series, which was eventually approved. The Painkiller Jane TV series appears to be a "reboot" of the TV-movie, discarding the film's backstory and starting anew.

== Plot ==
A Special Forces unit, known as the Painkiller Unit, is exposed to a biochemical weapon while on a mission in Sovetskaia, Chechnya. While attempting to retreat, the entire unit is ambushed and executed by a group of armed men in protective hazmat suits. One member of the unit, Captain Jane Browning (Emmanuelle Vaugier), not only survives the execution, but recovers from the viral infection and develops an abnormally rapid healing factor, increased dexterity, speed, strength, enhanced senses, mental abilities, and a photographic memory.

Jane is studied by a psychiatrist, Dr. Graham Knight (Tate Donovan), though she refuses to cooperate with his attempt at examining her mental state. She is extensively tested by the military, and when her superior Colonel Ian Watts (Richard Roundtree) has her transferred to Alaska for more tests, Jane (fearing they'll never let go of her) escapes with professional thief, Nick Pierce (Eric Dane).

Taking shelter with Nick, Jane meets his companions and lives with them briefly. Before long though she leaves to find out more about what was done to her, tracking down Dr. Graham.

Graham reveals himself to be Captain Lucas Insley. He claims to be investigating Watts, who has created the fake identity of Peter Erfan, the man who ostensibly created the virus she was exposed to.

Jane meets with Watts in a public place for safety, hoping to expose what happened. Watts says that Insley is Erfan, and he created the virus which alters people's DNA to enhance them. Their meeting is interrupted when gunmen attack however, with Jane throwing herself in front of Watts to take a bullet meant for him. After this, she chases after them and runs into Insley.

Insley admits that he is, in fact, Peter Erfan, and has a vial of liquid which he has extracted from Jane. Erfan refers to her as the new Eve, as something in her body altered the virus and then the virus changed her. This is why she survived but the rest of her unit did not.

While they are talking, an assassin starts to move in on Jane, who shoots him. However, Erfan has already been able to recreate the modified virus, and has given it to the assassin. As he is talking with her, the assassin gets up, rips a power box off the wall, and hits Jane on the head with it.

She wakes up in a helicopter being transported away by Insley, who plans to use her for development of his project. Jane escapes from the handcuffs he placed her in though. A struggle ensues in which the helicopter is disabled, with Jane then jumping from it with Insley below her, using him as a cushion. He is later believed to be dead.

The final scene sees a group of Asian men walk into a laboratory and meet with Peter Erfan however. He holds a vial of green fluid, the genetic material for the enhancement virus in a solution. The implication is that Erfan took the solution himself, allowing him to survive an impact with a river after apparently having fallen, and will soon be creating an army of superhumans for the unnamed Asian business partner.

== Cast ==
- Emmanuelle Vaugier as Captain Jane Elizabeth Browning
  - Paula Brancati as Young Jane Browning
- Eric Dane as Nick Pierce
- Richard Roundtree as Colonel Ian Watts, Jane's Supervising Officer
- Nels Lennarson as Agent Thorpe
- Richard Harmon as "Squeak"
- Walker Howard as "Blue"
- Tate Donovan as Dr. Graham Knight / Captain Lucas Insley / Peter Erfan
- Venus Terzo as Carla Browning, Jane's Sister
  - Elicia Mackenzie as Young Carla Browning
- Callum Keith Rennie as Secretary of Defense Donnie Mitchell
- Martin Cummins as Sergeant Flynn
- Aleks Paunovic as Sergeant Frizelle
- Zoran Vukelic as Mr. Grey (Zoran)
- Sean Akira as Taiwanese Businessman

== Reboot ==
In an interview with Moviepilot, Palmiotti is in progressing on a new film. As of November 2016, Jessica Chastain has reportedly signed on to star as Jane Vasko on the big screen with Lotus Entertainment's Lenny Beckerman producing along with Solipsist Films' Stephen L’Heureux and Chastain through her Freckle Films banner. Bill Johnson, Jim Seibel, Ara Keshishian and Palmiotti will exec produce the film. Christine Boylan was signed to write the script.
