= Libby Johnson =

American singer and composer

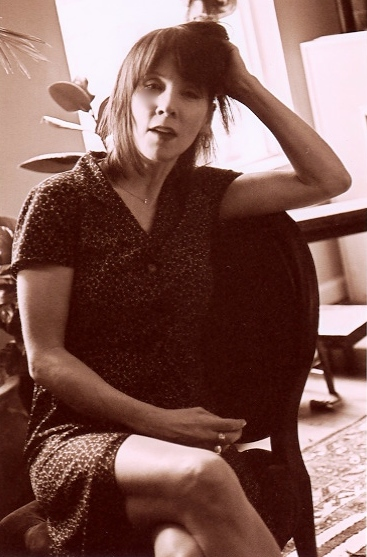

Background information
- Born: Germany
- Genres: Folk, Americana
- Occupation: Singer-songwriter
- Years active: 1983–present
- Labels: Zero Hour Records; Universal; Wrong Records
- Website: libbyjohnsonmusic.com

Libby Johnson is an American singer-songwriter. She co-founded the indie folk band 22 Brides in 1992, and released her debut solo album, Annabella, in 2006.

== Early life and education ==
Johnson was born on an army base in Germany. She moved around on the East Coast of the United States and moved to Nairobi, Kenya, when she was 13. She started playing piano at age 7. She and her younger sister, Carrie Johnson, started singing together when they were children. They performed in Kenya, before returning to the United States while in high school. They went to the Berklee College of Music in Boston before moving to New York City in 1983.

== Career ==
=== 22 Brides ===
In 1992, the sisters formed the indie folk duo 22 Brides, and in 1993 they put out the self-released eight-song CD Selling Fruit in Cairo. The band name 22 Brides comes from an Indian folk tale they heard when they were younger. After being spotted during one of their monthly gigs at CBGB's Gallery in New York, the duo signed with indie label Zero Hour Records in 1994. On June 22, 1994, they released their self-titled debut, consisting of remixed songs from their self-released effort plus four new songs. The album was produced by Daniel Wise, with additional production from Godfrey Diamond, and features Jonathan Mover on drums and Mark Bosch on guitar.

On the year-long tour for 22 Brides, and in advance of their second album, Beaker, 22 Brides expanded into a four-member band with John Skehan (guitar, bass) and Ned Stroh (drums) joining Libby Johnson (bass, keyboards, vocals) and Carrie Johnson (guitar, vocals). Produced by Adam Lasus, the album had a more highly produced feel than the folk influences of the band's debut. Following a Zero Hour distribution deal with Universal Records, Beaker was released on Zero Hour / Universal.

On September 9, 1997, Zero Hour released the 22 Brides EP Blazes of Light, which was a sampler of sorts, with songs from their first two albums, "Purified" from their upcoming third album, and a cover of Leonard Cohen's "Hallelujah".

The band's third LP, Demolition Day, was released in 1998, with a return to the more intimate sound of 22 Brides. In an effort to get back to their folk-pop harmonizing roots, the band worked again with Daniel Wise and recorded their vocal tracks live and switched to a trio formation, with Libby Johnson on bass and vocals, Carrie Johnson on guitar and vocals, and Bill Dobrow on drums. The first single from the album "Another Distant Light" debuted on WNNX (99X) out of Atlanta.

In October 1995, 22 Brides toured with Dick Dale. 22 Brides played at the 1998 Lilith Fair, and also opened for Ani DiFranco and Freedy Johnston.

In 1996, Joe Quesada and Jimmy Palmiotti introduced characters based on Libby and Carrie Johnson in their comic book series Ash. They then created a four-book miniseries, 22 Brides, published by Event Comics, revolving around the characters based on the sisters, with the first issue published on February 7, 1996. Palmiotti later created a spinoff series, Painkiller Jane.

The band recorded a cover of the Graham Parker song "You Can't Be Too Strong" for the 2013 tribute album Piss & Vinegar: The Songs of Graham Parker.

=== Solo ===
In 2006, after hearing Johnson's upcoming album, "Annabella", writer-director Bart Freundlich decided to use four of her songs in his film Trust the Man, starring David Duchovny, Billy Crudup, Julianne Moore and Maggie Gyllenhaal. He said that he re-edited scenes around her songs. Johnson also wrote a new song, "Indelible Mark", which plays over the film's end credits, and features Shawn Pelton on drums. The soundtrack and Johnson's solo debut, Annabella, were both released on September 5, 2006, on Wrong Records. Annabella features Steve Jordan on drums, and guitarists Mark Bosch, Steve Conte and John Putnam.

Johnson's solo follow-up, Perfect View, was released in 2010 on Wrong Records. It was produced by Daniel Wise, with Mark Boquist on drums, Mick Hargreaves on bass, and guitarists Mark Bosch and Jimi Zhivago, as well as appearances by Lucy Wainwright Roche and Garland Jeffreys.

== Personal life ==
Johnson lives in New York City with her husband and their two children.

== Discography ==
=== 22 Brides ===
| Year | Title |
|---|---|
| 1993 | Selling Fruit in Cairo: Released: 1993; Label: Soak Jimmy; Formats: CD |
| 1994 | 22 Brides: Released: June 22, 1994; Label: Zero Hour; Formats: CD, cassette, digital download |
| 1995 | Beaker: Released: October 17, 1995; Label: Zero Hour / Universal; Formats: CD, digital download |
| 1997 | Blazes of Light EP: Released: September 9, 1997; Label: Zero Hour; Formats: CD, digital download |
| 1998 | Demolition Day: Released: April 7, 1998; Label: Zero Hour; Formats: CD, digital download |

=== Solo ===
| Year | Title |
|---|---|
| 2006 | Annabella: Released: September 5, 2006; Label: Wrong Records; Formats: CD, digital download |
| 2010 | Perfect View: Released: June 1, 2010; Label: Wrong Records; Formats: CD, digital download |

=== Singles ===
| Year | Song | Artist | Album |
|---|---|---|---|
| 1994 | "Visions of You" | 22 Brides | 22 Brides |
| 1995 | "Lullabye" | 22 Brides | Beaker |
| 1998 | "Another Distant Light" | 22 Brides | Demolition Day |
| 2013 | "You Can't Be Too Strong" | 22 Brides | Piss & Vinegar: The Songs of Graham Parker |

=== Film/TV soundtrack appearances ===
| Year | Song | Artist | Film/TV show | Notes |
|---|---|---|---|---|
| 1996 | "No Enemies" | 22 Brides | No Way Home | |
| 2006 | "Indelible Mark" | Libby Johnson | Trust the Man | |
| 2006 | "Don't Mean You Lost Your Love" | Libby Johnson | Trust the Man | |
| 2006 | "Rain" | Libby Johnson | Trust the Man | |
| 2006 | "Every Broken Curve" | Libby Johnson | Trust the Man | |
| 2008 | "Don't Mean You Lost Your Love" | Libby Johnson | The Riches (FX) | Season 2, episode 4 |
| 2008 | "Under the Gate" | Libby Johnson | Smallville (The CW) | Season 8, episode 10 |
| 2009 | "Mi La Vie" | Libby Johnson | Steven Seagal: Lawman (A&E) | Season 1, episode 2; season 1, episode 10; season 2, episode 7 |
