= Beaker (album) =

Studio album by 22 Brides
- Released: 1995
- Recorded: Summer 1995
- Genre: Alternative rock, folk
- Label: Zero Hour
- Producer: Adam Lasus, Carrie Johnson, Libby Johnson

22 Brides chronology
22 Brides (1994)	Beaker (1995)	Blazes of Light EP (1997)

Beaker is the second album by the American band 22 Brides. It was released in 1995. The band supported the album by touring with Dick Dale. The first single was "Lullabye".

A comic book, 22 Brides, inspired in part by the band and created by Joe Quesada and Jimmy Palmiotti, was used to promote Beaker via a full-page ad in each issue.

== Production ==
The album was produced by Adam Lasus and band leaders/sisters Carrie and Libby Johnson, with additional production by J. Cox. Much of it was recorded using Lasus's analog equipment. Unlike the band's debut, Beaker included a studio drummer and an additional studio guitarist/bassist; full-time band members were recruited after its completion.

== Critical reception ==
Professional ratings
Review scores
Source	Rating
AllMusic	4/5 stars
The Encyclopedia of Popular Music	3/5 stars

Trouser Press thought that "the graft of punky abandon to the trunk of folky preciousness doesn’t mesh strongly enough to make the second album more than moderately intriguing ... but experimental hybrids do have a way of sprouting strange flowers." The Albuquerque Journal praised the "straightforward pop sincerity that rocks accordingly... No cutesy Veruca Salt beguilement or overly catchy riffs." The State deemed the album "a refreshing blast of energetic guitar pop, reminiscent of the Bangles and the Pretenders."

The St. Louis Post-Dispatch determined that "the melodies and execution frequently fall into pleasant genericism (and the slower stuff simply drags)." The Austin American-Statesman labeled the group a "Pretenders-meets-Nirvana quartet." Acknowledging the Indigo Girls comparisons resulting from the debut album, Tulsa World called the sisters "indie-go girls—all the guts without the cheap sentiment." The Washington Post opined that, "though it's noteworthy for being livelier and more raucous than the band's self-titled debut, 22 Brides' Beaker reveals that [the] sibling singer-songwriters ... have gotten better at both ballads and rockers."

AllMusic wrote that "22 Brides add a raw, electric edge to Carrie and Libby Johnson's blissful sibling harmonies on their sophomore release."

== Track listing ==
No.	Title	Length
1.	"Lullabye"
2.	"Already Thrown"
3.	"House on Fire"
4.	"Crash"
5.	"Henry"
6.	"True"
7.	"Truck Stop"
8.	"Sunday Best"
9.	"Chain"
10.	"Every Last Day"
11.	"Still Remains"
12.	"Insomnia"
13.	"No Enemies"
