= Painkiller Jane (TV series) =

American-Canadian science fiction television series

- Genre: Superhero
- Based on: Painkiller Jane by Jimmy Palmiotti; Joe Quesada
- Developed by: Gil Grant
- Starring: Kristanna Loken; Alaina Huffman; Rob Stewart; Stephen Lobo; Noah Danby; Melanie Papalia; Sean Owen Roberts; Nathaniel Deveaux
- Composers: John Sereda; Mike Thomas
- Countries of origin: Canada; United States
- No. of episodes: 22

Production
- Running time: 44 minutes
- Production companies: Insight Film Studios; Kickstart Productions; Starz Media

Original release
- Network: Global (Canada); Sci Fi Channel (U.S.)
- Release: April 13 – September 21, 2007

Painkiller Jane is a television series based on the comic book character of the same name. Airing on the Sci Fi Channel in the US starting April 13, 2007 and Global in Canada, it starred Kristanna Loken as the title character. The show was canceled after one season of 22 episodes.

The television series focuses on an agent of the Drug Enforcement Administration (DEA) who discovers that she has superhuman abilities which revive her after her apparent death. She is recruited by agents of a covert government agency which is tasked with identifying and neutralizing human mutants with mental powers.

== Plot ==
The series stars Loken as Jane Vasco. She begins as a DEA agent, where in the course of her work she encounters Andre McBride (Rob Stewart), who is the leader of a team of agents working for an unspecified government agency. The team is based in a disused subway station named Deckard Street. She is forced to join the team after she probes too far into their operations. It is then revealed that the team's mission is to identify and neutralize "neurological aberrants" ("neuros") – human mutants with supernormal mental powers. Dialogue in the pilot states there are dozens of variations, and the reasons neuros use their abilities vary. It is then theorized that the aberrations interfere with the brain's ability to distinguish right from wrong.

During the pilot episode, Vasco discovers that she has superhuman abilities – supernormal regenerative powers bordering on invulnerability. This is realized when she is pushed through a forty-story window and falls to her apparent death, only to later revive and recover completely. However, she still feels the pain of her injuries after they heal. The team's doctor, Seth Carpenter, identifies her abilities as not like those of the neuros they track, but "something else".

== Cast ==
- Kristanna Loken as Jane Vasco – the show's protagonist.
- Rob Stewart as Andre McBride – the leader of the special team.
- Stephen Lobo as Dr. Seth Carpenter – a doctor/scientist working with the team.
- Noah Danby as Connor King – the "muscles" of the team; a field operative with a short fuse.
- Sean Owen Roberts as Riley Jensen – a computer and communication technology specialist working for the team.
- Nathaniel Deveaux as Joe Waterman – former subway caretaker working for the team.
- Alaina Huffman as Maureen Bowers – Jane's best friend and former DEA partner.

== Episodes ==
No.	Title	Directed by	Written by	Neuro power	Original release date
1	"Pilot"	Nick Copus	Gil Grant	Neuro 1: Illusions; Neuro 2: Mind control	April 13, 2007
With the help of a new covert government unit, Jane Vasco must track down and contain the spread of "Neuros", genetically altered humans with special and extraordinary powers.
2	"Toy Soldiers"	Michael Robison	Lawrence Hertzog	Reanimation	April 20, 2007
A break-in at an ammo dump reveals a seemingly unstoppable thief, leading the team to investigate a Neuro plot possibly tied to a presidential visit.
3	"Piece of Mind"	Michael Robison	Charles Heit	Memory manipulation	April 27, 2007
Experts suffer from strange cases of selective amnesia, prompting the team to search for a Neuro who can manipulate peoples' memories.
4	"Catch Me If You Can"	Farhad Mann	Lisa Klink	Precognition	May 4, 2007
A Neuro with an ability to see into the future sends an eerie message to Jane warning her of an arrest that will go wrong, costing the lives of three people on her team.
5	"Nothing to Fear but Fear Itself"	Matthew Hastings	Lawrence Hertzog	Telepathy	May 11, 2007
The team must speculate on why a particular safe house drives its inhabitants insane by showing them their worst fears.
6	"Breakdown"	William Waring	Lisa Klink	Mental projection	May 18, 2007
Jane and Maureen interview a number of patients who have been admitted to a psychiatric facility for the same unusual and terrifying nightmare.
7	"Higher Court"	Matthew Hastings	Gillian Horvath	Illusions	June 1, 2007
Maureen is enjoying a rare romantic night out with an old friend when the evening suddenly goes very wrong.
8	"Friendly Fire"	David Tennant	Gillian Horvath	Shapeshifting	June 8, 2007
Jane awakens in hospital to find that she has murdered Riley, but appearances can be deceiving.
9	"Trial by Fire"	J. B. Sugar	Lawrence Hertzog	Fire manipulation	June 15, 2007
Connor is arrested and charged with arson and murder during a hunt for a Neuro the team believes is responsible for a string of house fires.
10	"Portraits of Lauren Gray"	Peter DeLuise	Robert Gilmer	Immortality through psychic vampirism	June 22, 2007
Jane and Maureen go undercover at a fashion show to find out the culprit behind rapidly aging young women.
11	"Ghost in the Machine"	Brent Clackson	Gillian Horvath	Neuro 1: Sonic scream Neuro 2: Technopathy	June 29, 2007
Connor suffers a series of unfortunate events, believing it to be coincidental, until the team learns that members of Connor's former police squad have been dying of unusual causes.
12	"Something Nasty in the Neighborhood"	Michael Robison	Lawrence Hertzog	Mind control	July 6, 2007
Jane and Connor go undercover as a married couple to investigate disappearances in a suburban community.
13	"The League"	Paul Ziller	Jimmy Palmiotti	Neuro: Power bestowal Franky: Telekinesis; Pat: Invisibility; Vivian: Persuasion; Alvin: Confusion	July 13, 2007
A Neuro takes matters into his own hands when his friends abuse the powers he has given them.
14	"The Amazing Howie"	Matthew Hastings	Lisa Klink	Magical powers	July 20, 2007
Howie is a magician who can miraculously perform the impossible, which prompts Riley to begin an investigation into possible Neuro activity.
15	"The Healer"	Michael Robison	Story by : Frank Lupo; Teleplay by : Charles Holland	Neuro 1: Invisibility; Neuro 2: Paralysis; Neuro 3: Energy manipulation	July 27, 2007
Sabotage hinders Jane's efforts to catch a Neuro, she becomes suspicious of a faith healer that she has been visiting.
16	"Thanks for the Memories"	Michael Robison	Charles Heit	Memory manipulation	August 3, 2007
Believing her team to be dead, Jane takes refuge with a Neuro leading to a trip down memory lane.
17	"Playback"	Matthew Hastings	Frank Cardea & George Schenck	Time travel	August 17, 2007
The team encounters a Neuro who can reset time to the beginning of the day.
18	"Jane 113"	Peter DeLuise	Lawrence Hertzog	Accelerated healing	August 24, 2007
Jane discovers the disturbing truth about her abilities while searching for a Neuro who escaped the team.
19	"What Lies Beneath"	Matthew Hastings	Mike Goldberg	Shapeshifting & accelerated healing	August 31, 2007
The team heads overseas to NICO when several Neuros escape, only to discover things at NICO are not in proper order.
20	"The Beast of Bolnar"	Farhad Mann	Charles Holland	Mental projection	September 7, 2007
Connor is attacked by a mythical beast in the small town near NICO, and the team must determine if it really is a monster, or a Neuro at work.
21	"Reflections"	Matthew Hastings	Matthew Carpenter	Phasing	September 14, 2007
Andre struggles to maintain objectivity when it appears one of the Neuros at NICO, whom he once dated, has managed to sneak in and out of the facility to murder two men.
22	"Endgame"	Farhad Mann	Gil Grant	Neuro 1: Paralysis; Neuro 2: Disintegration; Neuro 3: Fire manipulation Neuro 4: Illusions	September 21, 2007
A major emergency at NICO results in the facility's most dangerous Neuros breaking out, but the unlikely leader of their operation gives the team the greatest shock.

== Production ==
The TV series received a 22-episode production order after the 2005 Painkiller Jane TV-movie yielded positive results. The film differed significantly from the original comic's storyline; the TV series, in turn, discarded the film's back-story and started afresh. According to story creator Jimmy Palmiotti, the new series was "closer to the original concept we came up with in the comic". Executive producer Gil Grant has said the new series is "partly true" to the original comic, but will still differ to some extent.

The series credits include several people in the role of producer. Most are credited only for a few episodes. This includes Loken (the star), who is credited as co-executive producer for several episodes.

The TV series was filmed at Insight Film Studios in Maple Ridge, British Columbia, Canada and various locations around the Lower Mainland of British Columbia. The final four episodes were filmed and set in Budapest, Hungary.

== See also ==
- List of television programs based on comics
