= Event Comics =

Defunct American independent comic book publishing company

- Industry: Comics
- Founded: 1994
- Founder: Jimmy Palmiotti, Joe Quesada
- Defunct: 1999
- Headquarters: Chicago, Illinois, U.S.

Event Comics was an American independent comic book publisher founded by veteran artists Jimmy Palmiotti and Joe Quesada. The company published during the years 1994 to 1999. In 1998, it was contracted to form the Marvel Knights imprint for Marvel Comics.

== History ==
Penciller Quesada and inker Palmiotti, after working well together on various projects such as Valiant Comics' X-O Manowar, and following the creation of their first joint project in Kid Death & Fluffy for a "Creators Universe" card series, decided to create their own studio with their own original characters. They spent two weeks in the Florida Keys developing Ash, their flagship character.

Event published several series starring Ash, as well as stand-alone crossovers with another Event title, 22 Brides. The initial series, simply titled Ash, ran for a total of seven issues, with issue #6 leading directly into issue #0. The second series, Ash: The Fire Within ran for three issues. The final series to focus on the title character was Ash: Cinder & Smoke, which ran for a total of six issues. Ash also co-starred in the intercompany crossover Azrael/Ash, co-published with DC Comics in 1997.

Another popular Event character was Painkiller Jane, who made her first appearance in 22 Brides #1 (1995). Originally a five-issue mini-series, Painkiller Jane went on to star in numerous crossover books with the likes of Punisher, The Darkness, Darkchylde, Vampirella, and Hellboy.

In 1997, Event launched Crimson Plague, the first creator-owned comic by popular veteran cartoonist George Pérez. Originally intended as a six-issue mini-series about an alien with ultra-toxic blood, Pérez produced only one issue. He later temporarily revived the title with Image Comics in 2000.

Other Event Comics titles included Thrax (1996), the Kid Death & Fluffy Spring Break Special (1996), the Kid Death & Fluffy Halloween Special (1997), Legends of Kid Death & Fluffy (1997), and Here Come the Big People (1997).

=== Marvel Knights ===
In 1998, the Event Comics team was contracted by Marvel Comics to breathe new life into some of their second-tier characters. Under the designation of "Marvel Knights", Palmiotti and Quesada were given creative control of Black Panther, Daredevil, The Punisher and The Inhumans. Event hired the creative teams for the line while Marvel published them, and in September the Marvel Knights imprint was born.

As Marvel Knights editor, Quesada encouraged experimentation and used his contacts in the indie comics world to bring in new creators such as David W. Mack, Michael Avon Oeming, Brian Michael Bendis, Garth Ennis, and Steve Dillon. The Event Comics creative teams eventually produced popular, well-regarded Knights runs like Kevin Smith & Quesada's Daredevil and Christopher Priest's Black Panther.

Once Marvel Knights was implemented back into Marvel proper, Quesada and Palmiotti returned to the Marvel fold, and Event Comics was shut down, the last comics published being Ash: Fire and Crossfire in January and March 1999, respectively. In 2000, Quesada ascended to the role of Marvel's editor-in-chief. As of June 2010, he is also Chief Creative Officer (CCO) of Marvel Entertainment; this double commitment led to Quesada stepping down as editor-in-chief in January 2011:

With my increased travel schedule over the last year plus, I've only been able to work with the publishing division in a more macro sense, or as you put it, a more, "big picture", sense. During this time, Tom and Axel have been handling the more detailed functions of the stories within our comics. My role has been one in which I work on the larger stories and the overall flavor and feel of our books and universe.

== Titles ==
- 22 Brides (1996)
- Ash (1994)
- Ash #½ (co-published with Wizard magazine, 1997)
- Ash/22 Brides (1996)
- Ash: The Fire Within (1996)
- Ash: Cinder & Smoke (1997)
- Ash: Fire And Crossfire (1999)
- Ash Files (1997)
- Crimson Plague (1997)
- Here Come the Big People (1997)
- Kid Death & Fluffy Halloween Special (1997)
- Kid Death & Fluffy Spring Break Special (1996)
- Legends of Kid Death & Fluffy (1997)
- Painkiller Jane (1997)
- Thrax (1996)

=== Crossovers ===
- Azrael/Ash (co-published with DC Comics, 1997)
- Painkiller Jane vs. The Darkness (co-published with Top Cow Productions, 1997)
- Painkiller Jane/Darkchylde (co-published with Image Comics, 1998)
- Painkiller Jane/Hellboy (co-published with Dark Horse Comics, 1998)
- Vampirella/Painkiller Jane (co-published with Harris Comics, 1998)

== Creators associated with Event Comics ==
- Joe Quesada – co-founder
- Jimmy Palmiotti – co-founder
- Brian Augustyn
- Trace Beaulieu
- John Cebollero
- Amanda Conner
- Garth Ennis
- Scott Lee
- Rick Parker
- George Pérez
- Humberto Ramos
- James Robinson
- Dave Ross
- Mark Waid
