= New Justice =

2018–2021 DC Comics relaunch

Publication information
- Publisher: DC Comics
- Genre: Superhero
- Publication date: May 2018 – January 2021
- Main character: DC Universe

New Justice is a 2018 relaunch by American comic book publisher DC Comics of its entire line of ongoing monthly superhero comic book titles, using the end of Dark Nights: Metal as its launching point, followed by the Year of the Villain event. The relaunch is a follow-up to DC Rebirth (2016–2017), and was succeeded by Infinite Frontier (2021–2023).

== List of titles ==
=== Ongoing series ===
Title	Start date	End date	Issues	Initial writer(s)	Initial artist(s)
Justice League (vol. 4)	June 6, 2018	April 19, 2022	1-75	Scott Snyder	Mark Morales, Jim Cheung
Justice League Dark	July 25, 2018	December 21, 2020	1-29	James Tynion IV	Raúl Fernández, Alvaro Martinez
Catwoman	September 26, 2018	Ongoing	1-Ongoing	Joëlle Jones	
Justice League Odyssey	July 4, 2018	October 12, 2020	1-25	Joshua Williamson	Stjepan Šejić
Titans	July 27, 2016	April 10, 2019	23–36	Dan Abnett	Brandon Peterson
Teen Titans	October 26, 2016	November 17, 2020	20-47 (plus 1 annual)	Adam Glass	Bernard Chang
Hawkman	June 13, 2018	November 10, 2020	1-29	Robert Venditti	Bryan Hitch
Superman	July 11, 2018	June 24, 2021	1-28	Brian Michael Bendis	Ivan Reis
Suicide Squad	December 18, 2019	November 24, 2020	1-11	Tom Taylor	Bruno Redondo
The Green Lantern	November 7, 2018	October 2, 2019	1–12 (plus 1 annual)	Grant Morrison	Liam Sharp
Shazam!	February 23, 2019	September 22, 2020	1-15	Geoff Johns	Dale Eaglesham
Batman and the Outsiders	May 8, 2019	October, 13, 2020	1-17	Bryan Edward Hill	Dexter Soy
Batman/Superman	August 28, 2019	September 28, 2021	1-15	Joshua Williamson	David Marquez
Legion of Super-Heroes	November 6, 2019	January 19, 2021	1-12	Brian Michael Bendis	Ryan Sook
The Green Lantern: Season Two	February 12, 2020	March 9, 2021	1-12	Grant Morrison	Liam Sharp

=== Limited series ===
Title	Start date	End date	Issues	Initial writer(s)	Initial artist(s)
Justice League: No Justice	May 9, 2018	May 30, 2018	1–4	Scott Snyder, James Tynion IV, Joshua Williamson	Francis Manapul
Heroes in Crisis	September 26, 2018	May 29, 2019	1–9	Tom King	Clay Mann, Mitch Gerads
The Batman Who Laughs	December 12, 2018	July 31, 2019	1–7	Scott Snyder	Jock
Lois Lane	July 3, 2019	July 7, 2020	1–12	Greg Rucka	Mike Perkins
Event Leviathan	June 12, 2019	November 13, 2019	1–6	Brian Michael Bendis	Alex Maleev
Harley Quinn and Poison Ivy	September 4, 2019	February 12, 2020	1–6	Jody Houser	Adriana Melo
Legion of Super-Heroes: Millennium	September 4, 2019	October 2, 2019	1–2	Brian Michael Bendis	André Lima Araújo, Jim Lee, Dustin Nguyen, Andrea Sorrentino
Flash Forward	September 18, 2019	February 12, 2020	1–6	Scott Lobdell	Brett Booth, Norm Rapmund
Superman's Pal Jimmy Olsen	July 17, 2019	July 14, 2020	1–12	Matt Fraction	Steve Lieber
Metal Men	October 16, 2019	December 1, 2020	1-12	Dan DiDio	Shane Davis
Green Lantern: Blackstars	November 6, 2019	January 29, 2020	1–3	Grant Morrison	Xermanico
Year of the Villain: Hell Arisen	December 18, 2019	March 18, 2020	1–4	James Tynion IV	Steve Epting
Batman/Catwoman	December 1, 2020	June 28, 2022	1–12	Tom King	Clay Mann
Dark Nights: Death Metal	June 16, 2020	January 5, 2021	1-7	Scott Snyder	Greg Capullo

=== One-shots ===
==== "Batman" ====
Title	Release date	Initial writer(s)	Initial artist(s)
The Batman Who Laughs: The Grim Knight	March 13, 2019	Scott Snyder, James Tynion IV	Eduardo Risso
Batman: Pennyworth: R.I.P.	February 12, 2020	Peter J. Tomasi, James Tynion IV	Varies

==== "Year of the Villain" ====
Title	Release date	Initial writer(s)	Initial artist(s)
Year of the Villain Special	May 1, 2019	Varies	Varies
Sinestro: Year of the Villain	August 7, 2019	Mark Russell	Brandon Peterson
Black Mask: Year of the Villain	August 21, 2019	Tom Taylor	Cully Hamner
The Riddler: Year of the Villain	September 11, 2019	Mark Russell	Scott Godlewski
Lex Luthor: Year of the Villain	September 18, 2019	Jason Latour	Bryan Hitch, Andrew Currie
The Joker: Year of the Villain	October 9, 2019	John Carpenter, Anthony Burch	Phillip Tan, Marc Deering
Black Adam: Year of the Villain	October 23, 2019	Paul Jenkins	Inaki Miranda
Ocean Master: Year of the Villain	December 11, 2019	Dan Watters	Miguel Mendonça
Harley Quinn's Villain of the Year	December 11, 2019	Mark Russell	Mike Norton and Amanda Conner

==== "Superman" ====
Title	Release date	Initial writer(s)	Initial artist(s)
Superman: Leviathan Rising Special	May 29, 2019	Marc Andreyko, Brian Michael Bendis, Matt Fraction, Greg Rucka	Steve Lieber, Eduardo Pansica, Yanick Paquette, Mike Perkins
Superman: Heroes	January 29, 2020	Brian Michael Bendis	Scott Godlewski, Steve Lieber, Kevin Maguire, Mike Norton, Mike Perkins
Leviathan Dawn	February 26, 2020	Brian Michael Bendis	Alex Maleev
Superman: Villains	March 4, 2020	Matt Fraction	Bryan Hitch, Scott Godlewski, Steve Lieber

==== "Tales from the Dark Multiverse" ====
Title	Publication date	Initial writer(s)	Initial artist(s)	Based on
Tales from the Dark Multiverse: Batman: Knightfall	October 16, 2019	Kyle Higgins, Scott Snyder	Javier Fernandez	"Batman: Knightfall"
Tales from the Dark Multiverse: The Death of Superman	October 30, 2019	Jeff Loveness	Andrew Hennessy, Brad Walker	"The Death of Superman"
Tales from the Dark Multiverse: Blackest Night	November 13, 2019	Tim Seeley	Kyle Hotz	"Blackest Night"
Tales from the Dark Multiverse: Infinite Crisis	November 27, 2019	James Tynion IV	Aaron Lopresti, Matt Ryan	"Infinite Crisis"
Tales from the Dark Multiverse: New Teen Titans - The Judas Contract	December 11, 2019	Mat Groom, Kyle Higgins	Tom Raney	"The Judas Contract"
Tales from the Dark Multiverse: Flashpoint	December 2020	Bryan Hitch	Bryan Hitch	"Flashpoint"
Tales from the Dark Multiverse: Batman: Hush	November 3, 2020	Phillip Kennedy Johnson	Dexter Soy	"Batman: Hush"

==== "The Infected" ====
Title	Release date	Initial writer(s)	Initial artist(s)
The Infected: King Shazam	November 6, 2019	Sina Grace	Joe Bennett
The Infected: Scarab	November 20, 2019	Dennis Hopeless	Freddie Williams II
The Infected: Deathbringer	December 4, 2019	Zoë Quinn	Ben Oliver
The Infected: The Commissioner	December 18, 2019	Paul Jenkins	Jack Herbert

== See also ==
- The New Age of DC Heroes
- The Sandman Universe
