= Justice League Odyssey =

DC Comics series

- Cover of Justice League Odyssey #1 (September 2018), art by Stjepan Šejić.

Publication information
- Publisher: DC Comics
- Schedule: Monthly
- Format: Ongoing series
- Genre: Superhero
- Publication date: September 2018 – October 2020
- No. of issues: 25
- Main character: Justice League Odyssey

Creative team
- Written by: Joshua Williamson, Dan Abnett
- Penciller(s): Stjepan Šejić; Philippe Briones; Carmine Di Giandomenico; Will Conrad; Daniel Sampere; ChrisCross; Cliff Richards
- Inker(s): Will Conrad; Juan Albarran; Carmine Di Giandomenico

Justice League Odyssey is a 25-issue ongoing comic series published by DC Comics from September 25, 2018 to October 13, 2020. Written by Joshua Williamson with art by Stjepan Sejic, the series has a connection to the New Justice relaunch.

== Story ==
Shortly after the end of Dark Nights: Metal and Justice League: No Justice, a mysterious new zone titled the Ghost Sector appeares in outer space. Within the Ghost Sector is a large number of planets that were held captive by the Coluans. After being led by Darkseid to the Ghost Sector, Cyborg, Starfire, and Azrael begin their search using a stolen Brainiac Skull Ship. Also present in the Ghost Sector is Jessica Cruz, who is being assigned to patrol the area by the Green Lantern Corps.

After barely surviving a crash landing, the four suddenly encounter Darkseid, who tells them his twisted plan of using Cyborg, Starfire, and Azrael to gain control of the multiverse. According to the prophecy, the alien worlds were long hidden away from the multiverse because of the Old Gods they worshipped.

The team eventually attempts an idea with Epoch, the Lord of Time. Orion also appears at some point, rescuing Jessica Cruz after she is killed by Darkseid. Orion initially appears under the guise of Okkult until his ruse is discovered.

== Team members ==
Character	Real name	Notes
Cyborg	Victor Stone	Founding member of the Justice League. Feeling guilt over the destruction that happened during Justice League: No Justice, he seeks the truth on why the Coluans hid the newly-freed alien worlds. He unknowingly makes a connection to Darkseid, while using fusing with the latter's Mother Box.
Starfire	Koriand'r	Founding member of the Teen Titans, who intends to find her home planet Tamaran. Believing that she was being instructed by X'Hal to go to the Ghost Sector, she joins Cyborg.
Green Lantern	Jessica Cruz	Originally assigned by the Green Lantern Corps to patrol the Ghost Sector, she encounters Cyborg, Starfire, and Azael on Brainiac's stolen ship.
Azrael	Jean-Paul Valley	An assassin who was created by the Order of St. Dumas to bring justice to Gotham City. He is also the second character to take the Batman name for a short time during the Knightfall storyline. Unknowingly hearing Darkseid's voice, he leaves Gotham to become a stowaway on Brainiac's ship to reach the Ghost Sector.

== Collected Issues ==
=== New Justice (2018-2021) ===
Title	Material collected	Published date	ISBN
Justice League Odyssey
Justice League Odyssey Vol. 1: The Ghost Sector	Justice League Odyssey (2018) #1-5	May 22, 2019	978-1401289492
Justice League Odyssey, Vol. 2: Death of the Dark	Justice League Odyssey #6-12	November 26, 2019	978-1401295066
Justice League Odyssey, Vol. 3: Final Frontier	Justice League Odyssey #13-18	August 25, 2020	978-1401289492
Justice League Odyssey, Vol. 4: Last Stand	Justice League Odyssey #19-25	March 30, 2021	978-1779509161
