= Ash (comics) =

Superhero firefighter comic book character

- Ash as seen in Azrael vs. Ash (1997).

Publication information
- Publisher: Event Comics
- Publication date: November 1994 - 1999
- Main character(s): Ash, Adam, Gabriel, The Actor

Creative team
- Written by: Jimmy Palmiotti,
- Artist: Joe Quesada

Ash is an American comic book character created by Joe Quesada and Jimmy Palmiotti, and published by Event Comics, about a firefighter who gains superpowers from a time-displaced regeneration device from a possible apocalyptic future.

Ash is the super-hero alter-ego of fictional firefighter Ashley Quinn. Ash was "born" from a mysterious incident when Ashley was trapped inside a burning building and hidden inside was a regeneration chamber from the future. Ash has the ability to use various flame-based weapons, including blades that can be made from fire by his gauntlets. He can also absorb and control fire, and additionally possesses superhuman strength and durability. He draws his power from flames and fire inside his body which can reach temperatures of 1260 degrees Fahrenheit.

== Publication ==
Event Comics published several series starring Ash, as well as stand-alone crossovers with another Event title, 22 Brides.

Ash also appears in Cyberforce #27-28 in 1996, and starred in a crossover Azrael/Ash #1 with Azrael in 1997. The initial series, simply titled Ash, ran for a total of seven issues, with issue six leading directly into issue zero.

The second series, Ash: The Fire Within, ran for two issues (issue 3 was not published). The final series to focus on the title character was Ash: Cinder & Smoke, which ran for a total of six issues.

An ongoing Ash series was announced for November 1997, with a creative team of James Robinson (writer), Joe Quesada (penciler), and Jimmy Palmiotti (inker). The first story arc of the series was to resolve the plot of the incomplete Ash: The Fire Within, and Palmiotti said that "I swear we'll be on time. The plan is, a year from now we'll be on #12, and in ten years we'll be on #120". Issue #1 failed to reach completion.

In 1999, a two issue series, Ash: Fire and Crossfire, was released by Event Comics before its demise.

Through the comics' four-issue year run, and various incarnations, Wizard Entertainment produced a mini-comic (#4), Wizard Ash 1/2 (numbered as both 0 and 1/2) and The Ash Files.

== Creation and inspiration ==
From an interview with Jimmy Palmiotti in January 2009:

We were in Chicago, and I remember it exactly. I came up with the initial idea it in the shower. I came out of the bathroom, dressed [laughter] and hit Joe with it. It was as simple as "fireman superhero". We both sat for a long time and hashed out the idea some more. It wasn’t for a few more days before my brother Peter came up with the name "Ash". ... Selling Ash to DreamWorks had its effect on us as well.

== Comic book appearances ==
1. Ash #0-6: http://www.comicvine.com/jimmy-palmiotti/26-3068/ash/49-18323/
2. Azrael/Ash #1: http://www.comicvine.com/azrael-ash-/37-118237/
3. Ash: The Fire Within #1-2: http://www.comicvine.com/ash-the-fire-within/49-18321/
4. Ash: Cinder & Smoke #1-6: http://www.comicvine.com/ash-cinder-smoke/49-18317/
5. Ash: Fire and Crossfire #1-2:
6. Wizard mini-comic (#4): http://www.comicvine.com/ash-wizard-mini-comic-4/37-126655/
7. Wizard Ash #1/2 (numbered as both 0 and 1/2): http://www.comicvine.com/ash-wizard-12/37-126653/
8. The Ash Files:
