= Stjepan Šejić =

Croatian comic book writer and artist (born 1981)

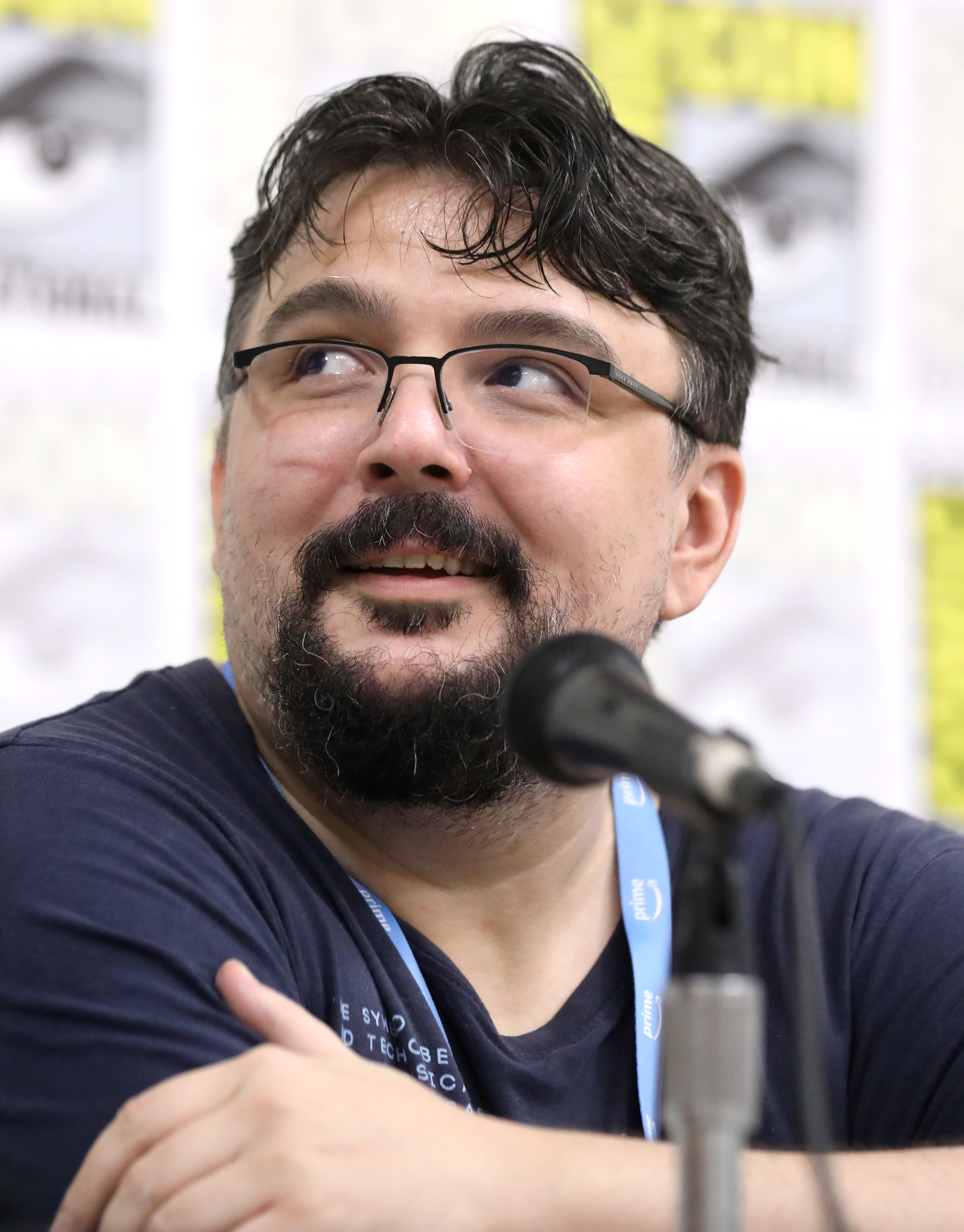
- Šejić in 2023
- Born: 27 November 1981 (age 44) Vinkovci, SR Croatia, SFR Yugoslavia
- Areas: Writer, artist
- Pseudonyms: Nebezial, Shiniez
- Notable works: Ravine, Sunstone, Witchblade, The Darkness, First Born
- Spouse: Linda Šejić

Stjepan Šejić (born 27 November 1981) is a Croatian comic book writer and artist, known for his work on the series Witchblade, Aphrodite IX, Sunstone, and The Darkness among others.

== Career ==
Šejić was born in Vinkovci and resides in Crikvenica, Croatia. Before he started as a comic book artist, he wanted to become a lawyer. Šejić started his career as a colorist, painting covers drawn by Tyler Kirkham. He was mainly inspired by Italian comics before he stumbled upon a copy of Top Cow's Witchblade, which inspired his own art. His work is also influenced by Marc Silvestri and Michael Turner.

In 2007, Šejić signed up to draw the art for Witchblade from issue #116 to #150, the longest run of the series drawn by a single artist once completed. He also illustrated the Witchblade miniseries First Born and Broken Trinity, and covers of the Top Cow series The Darkness. He also cooperates with smaller publishers such as Arcana Studio and Dynamite Entertainment. In 2020, Šejić announced his departure from the mainstream comic book industry, choosing instead to focus on his creator-owned works.

== Personal life ==
Šejić is married to fellow Croatian artist Linda Lukšić Šejić.

== Bibliography ==
=== Interior art ===
==== Arcana Studios ====
- Arcana Studio Presents: Free Comic Book Day #2006–07
- Kade: Sun of Perdition #1–4 (2006–07)

==== DC Comics ====
Key
†	Indicates titles that Šejić is currently working on

Title	Year(s)	Issue(s)	Notes	Ref(s)
Harley Quinn	2014	Annual #1		
Aquaman	2017	#25–#30	Issues #25–#30 were collected in the trade paperback Aquaman: Underworld.	
Suicide Squad	2017	#20 and #26		
Justice League Odyssey	2018	#1-2		
Harleen	2019	#1-3		
Harley Quinn 30th Anniversary Special	2022	#1	Was also a writer, colorist, and variant cover artist.	

==== Image Comics / Top Cow ====
- Angelus #1–6 (2009–10)
- Angelus Pilot Season #1 (2007)
- Aphrodite IX (2013)
- Art of Witchblade, one-shot (2008)
- Artifacts #0-25 (2010–13)
- Broken Trinity #1–3 (2008)
- Darkness Level, 5-part miniseries, (covers and interiors): #1–2; (covers): #3–4 (2006–07)
- Death Vigil #1–present (2014-)
- Fine Print #1-present (2021-)
- First Born #1–3 (2007–2008)
  - First Look, one-shot (2007)
  - Aftermath, one-shot (2008)
  - Prelude (2008)
- Sunstone (2011-)
- Rat Queens #9–10 (2015)
- Witchblade #105–107, #116–138, #140–141, #144–145 (2007–11)
- Ravine (2013–2014)

==== Radical Studios ====
- Aladdin: Legacy Of The Lost #2–3 (2010)

=== Writer ===
- Sunstone^{†} (2011-)
- Death Vigil^{†} #1–present (2014-)
- Fine Print^{†} #1-present (2021-)

=== Cover art ===
Arcana Studios

- Ezra vs. 10th Muse #1 (2006)
- Ezra: Evoked Emotions #1–3 (2006–07)

DC

- Batman: Arkham Knight-Genesis #1–6 (2015–2016)
- Suicide Squad #26 (2017)
- Nightwing #29 (2017)
- Teen Titans #12 (2017)
- Green Arrow #32 (2017)
- Aquaman #25–#33 (2017–2018)
- Justice League Odyssey (2018–Present)

Dynamite Entertainment

- Army of Darkness #9–17 (2009)
  - Home Sweet Hell #10
  - King For A Dav #13 (2008)
  - The Long Road Home #6–8 (2008)
- Battlestar Galactica #5–8 (2007)
  - Season Zero #1–8 (2007–2008)
  - Zarek #1–4 (2006–2007)
- Brothers in Arms #1–4 (2008)
- Painkiller Jane: Everything Explodes, Part 1 (2007)
- Pathfinder: Origins #2 (2015)
- Red Sonja Annual 2006
- Savage Red Sonja: Queen of the Frozen Wastes #2–4 (2006)
- Savage Tales #2–4 (2007)
- Savage Tales: The Witches Familiar #1 (2007)
- Savage Tales: Beautiful Creatures/Sellsword #5 (2007)
- Terminator: Revolution (2008)
- Terminator 2: Infinity #1–5 (2007)
- Xena: Warrior Princess: Dark Xena #1–4 (2007)
- Xena: Warrior Princess Annual #1

Image Comics / Top Cow

- Ant v2 #10 (cover B) (2007)
  - Aftermath (2009)
- Commanders in Crisis #1 (2020)
- Cyberforce/Hunter-Killer #2 (2009)
- Cyblade #3 (2009)
- Darkness #75 (2009)
- Darkness: Empire #1–6 (2007–08)
- Darkness/Pitt #1–3 (2009)
- Darkness/Witchblade/Angelus Trinity: Blood On The Sands (2009)
- Darkness/Wolverine: Old Wounds (painting over Tyler Kirkham pencils), one-shot (2006)
- Deep Beyond #1 (2021)
- Dragon Prince #1 (Sept. 2008)
- Fusion: Gods & Monsters #1 (2009)
- Helm Greycastle #2 (2021)
- Magdalena/Daredevil, one-shot (2008)
- Mirka Andolfo's Sweet Paprika #2 (2021)
- Rat Queens #25 (2021)
- Unholy Union #1 (2007)
- Witchblade/Devi #1 (2008)

Marvel

- Realm Of Kings: Inhumans #1–5 (2010)
- Secret Invasion: Inhumans #1–4 (2009)
- She-Hulk: Cosmic Collision (2009)
- X-Men: Endangered Species (2007)

Radical Publishing

- Freedom Formula #3–5 (2008)
- Hercules: The Thracian Wars (2008)
- Hotwire: Requiem for the Dead - Dead Letters #2 (2009)
- Hotwire: Requiem for the Dead - Read Me First #1 (2009)

Zenescope Entertainment

- 1001 Arabian Nights: The Adventures of Sinbad
- Grimm Fairy Tales #1, 6 (2007–08)

=== Video games ===
- Serious Sam 3: BFE (high-polygon character model art, artbook) (2011)

== Awards ==
In 2023, Šejić was a recipient of the Inkpot Award at the annual San Diego Comic Con.
