= Painkiller Jane =

Superheroine from Event Comics

- Painkiller Jane #1. Art by Rick Leonardi and Jimmy Palmiotti.

Publication information
- Publisher: Event Comics; Marvel Comics; Dynamite Entertainment; PaperFilms
- First appearance: 22 Brides #1 (March 1996)
- Created by: Jimmy Palmiotti; Joe Quesada

In-story information
- Full name: Jane Vasko, Jane Browning, (TV film), Jane Vasco (TV series)
- Team affiliations: 22 Brides
- Abilities: Healing factor, expert fighter and markswoman skills

Painkiller Jane is a superheroine created by Jimmy Palmiotti and Joe Quesada for Event Comics in 1995. Originally a five-issue mini-series, the character went on to star in numerous crossover titles with the likes of the Punisher, Vampirella, and Hellboy.

After Event Comics, the character was exclusively written by Jimmy Palmiotti and drawn by various artists as it jumped from publisher to publisher. The series relaunched at Dynamite Entertainment with the first mini-series selling out. After that Marvel Comics published two mini-series under its Icon brand. The character then came back to PaperFilms, a company owned by Jimmy Palmiotti and Amanda Conner where it is currently published. Painkiller Jane has been published all over the world in at least 8 languages to date. The comics have been the basis for a television film and series.

== Fictional character history ==
Jane Vasko was an undercover police officer posing as an elevator operator to infiltrate the Fonti Mob, passing information to Detective Fernandez. Don Joey Fonti was blackmailing the 22 Brides mercenaries to fight his turf wars for him, and Jane was likewise blackmailed into delivering a message to rival gang leader Adam, not realizing that an explosive device has been planted on her. The explosion killed Jane, but Adam was uninjured and through mysterious means revived Jane, giving her superhuman regenerative powers in the process. Leaving her life as a police officer behind, she became the vigilante Painkiller Jane.

A different origin is presented in the first Painkiller Jane miniseries: Vasko and Fernandez were both deep undercover in the organization of the Brothers Blanco who were designing drugs that altered users on a chromosomal level. When Fernandez' husband, who was still on the force, was wounded, she went to see him, blowing their cover and exposing Jane. She was shot up with a large quantity of unknown drugs that left her in a deep coma for two years, during which she was pronounced legally dead. After finally waking up, Jane went to take revenge on the Blancos, discovering that the drugs have mutated her system and granted her superhuman healing. The life she had before had fallen apart, and Jane became a vigilante assisted by Fernandez, who felt guilt for what she did to her.

The Dynamite Comics' miniseries contain references to both versions of the character's origin.

== Powers and abilities ==
Jane Vasko is virtually indestructible; her exceptional regenerative abilities mean that minor injuries heal in seconds and do not even slow her down while more major ones tend to take a few minutes. She has recovered from multiple gunshot wounds, explosions, chemical weapons, axes buried in her spine, even a shotgun blast to the face (which simply knocked her off her feet for a bit). However, her healing factor does not protect her nerve endings from registering the pain like a normal human, which is where her new name came from. On the offensive side, she has no real powers except for being a tough woman to kill. Other than that, she is a skilled fighter and master of undefined martial arts, as well as a master marksman with her weapons of choice, a brace of semiautomatic pistols.

== Bibliography ==
- 22 Brides #1–4 (Mar. 1996 – Jan. 1997)
- Painkiller Jane #0–5 (Jan.–Nov. 1997) (#0 printed in Jan. 1999)
- Painkiller Jane vol. 2, #1–3 (Mar.–Aug. 2006)
- Painkiller Jane vol. 3, #0–5 (Apr. 2007 – Mar. 2008)
- Painkiller Jane: The Price of Freedom #1–4 (Nov. 2013 – Jan. 2014)
- Painkiller Jane: The 22 Brides #1–3 (May–Oct. 2014)
- Painkiller Jane: Trust The Universe graphic novel (Aug. 2019)
- Painkiller Jane: Heartbreaker one-shot (Nov. 2021)
- Painkiller Jane: Beautiful Killers #1–2 (Apr. 2023)

=== Crossovers ===
- Ash/22 Brides #1–2 (Dec. 1996 – Apr. 1997)
- The Ash Files #1 (Mar. 1997)
- Painkiller Jane vs. The Darkness #1 (Apr. 1997)
- Vampirella: Crossover Gallery #1 (September 1997; pin-up only)
- No Justice, No Piece #1 (October 1997; short-story anthology; back inside pin-up only)
- Vampirella/Painkiller Jane #1 (May 1998)
- Painkiller Jane/Hellboy #1 (Aug. 1998)
- Painkiller Jane/Darkchylde #1 (Oct. 1998)
- The Punisher/Painkiller Jane #1 (Jan. 2001)
- Terminator 2 #6–7 (Jan.–Mar. 2008; crossover with vol. 3 #4–5)
- The CBLDF Presents: Liberty Comics #2 (Oct. 2009; short-story anthology)
- Painkiller Jane & G.I. Zombie #1–2 (May 2025)

== In other media ==
=== Television ===
- Painkiller Jane was made into a made-for-television movie and broadcast on the Sci-Fi Channel in December 2005. The film stars Emmanuelle Vaugier as Jane Browning. The film differed significantly from the comics, notably in regard to the character's origin, but led to a subsequent television series.
- The Sci-Fi Channel original series based on the character starred Kristanna Loken as Jane Vasco. The series' pilot aired in Friday, April 13, 2007. The name of the heroine in the show matched the character name from the original comics, unlike the Jane Browning character from the television film. The series received lukewarm reviews. Painkiller Jane did not return for a second season. The final episode aired on September 21, 2007.
