= Sunstone (comics) =

Comic by Stjepan Šejić

- Lisa and Ally from Sunstone
- Author: Stjepan Šejić
- Website: www.pixiv.net/en/users/36412059
- Current status/schedule: Ongoing
- Launch date: November 2011
- Genre(s): Erotica, Fetish, Romantic Comedy, BDSM

Sunstone is an adult webcomic series written and illustrated by Stjepan Šejić which was first published on DeviantArt in 2011 and later moved to Pixiv. Eight volumes of the ongoing series have been collected and published in trade paperback format by Image Comics and Top Cow Productions since 2014. The comic, described as an erotic romantic comedy, focuses on the relationship between a group of friends and their mutual interest in BDSM culture.

== Plot ==
=== Sunstone ===
Lisa Williams is a budding writer who has submissive desires but practically no experience in S/M other than self-bondage. Allison "Ally" Carter is a well-to-do programmer and dominant who has had decent experience with a former boyfriend, Alan, but has never been in a full D/S relationship as a domme. The two connect after Ally discovers Lisa's erotic fiction online and subsequently begin a real-life sub-domme arrangement. Their relationship and friendship blossom, which Lisa uses as a basis for her writings.

Lisa and Ally also start to develop romantic feelings for each other, but neither is willing to fully acknowledge them, partly due to the nature of their relationship. After they move in together, their attraction continues to grow but remains unaddressed, leading to tension, jealousy and ultimately conflict. Anne, a tattoo artist and mutual new friend, gets caught in the middle. The couple break up after a heated argument over Anne at a Halloween party, and Lisa moves back to her apartment.

Despite their breakup, neither Lisa nor Ally is able to fully let go. With Ally's encouragement, Lisa continues writing fiction based on the two, which she turns into allegorical stories in an attempt to salvage their relationship. Both Lisa and Ally come to recognize the mistakes they made as well as their own self-destructive emotional patterns, with the help of Alan and Anne (now a couple). Lisa sets up a date with Ally at a New Year's party, where the two reconcile and finally admit their true feelings for each other. They are shown to have become a married couple in the future.

=== Mercy ===
Alan Benson, a college student and BDSM enthusiast, has his drawings taken and posted in the hallways. As a result, he is subjected to widespread mockery and becomes an outcast. Ally Carter, an intrigued fellow student, reaches out and befriends him. The two's shared love for kink brings them closer and leads to creative experimentation on various aspects of BDSM, first in Alan's dorm room and later in the abandoned attic of a school building. They become addicted to their BDSM sessions at the expense of their grades and other responsibilities, and rising tensions cause them to break off their arrangement altogether. Sometime later, Alan is working at a BDSM club where he meets Marion, a woman with whom he had a destructive relationship prior to the events of Sunstone Volume 1.

Marianne "Anne" Murphy, an art student and metalhead, attends a concert and discovers her own attraction to women after developing a crush on the lead singer, Miriam. At a following concert, Anne encounters Laura, a lesbian and fellow Miriam fan. The two hit it off and begin a passionate romance through a series of dates at Miriam concerts. Prompted by Laura, Anne also starts a career as a tattoo artist. Laura's own fears and insecurities stemming from her past failures, however, begin to derail their relationship. Though they both try to mend things and affirm their love for one another, Laura eventually lashes out against Anne due to her own rising jealousy and possessiveness, and Anne breaks up with her once and for all.

== Conception and development ==
In November 2011, Šejić, then suffering from writer's block, began publishing fetish artworks under the DeviantArt account Shiniez. He eventually developed storylines involving two recurring characters, transforming his work from fetish comics to "a comic about fetishists [...] their lives, their hobby, and their relationships, honesty, and communication". He is assisted by his wife and fellow artist Linda Lukšić Šejić, who went on to create Blood Stain, a webcomic series sharing continuity with Sunstone. Šejić has over ten years of personal experience in the BDSM scene, and both he and his wife are practitioners, which informed the creation of the series. The story of Sunstone is told primarily through the eyes of the character Lisa, who is writing a book about her experiences.

Šejić plans Sunstone to be a four-part story of 20 volumes in total. Each new story arc after the first features a subtitle. The second arc is titled Mercy and the third arc Jasper. The fourth and final arc is as yet unnamed.

== Publication ==
Šejić initially published Sunstone online on DeviantArt. Top Cow Productions (an imprint of Image Comics) published the first volume of the series as a graphic novel in December 2014. Volume 2 was published in May 2015 and reached No. 7 on The New York Times Best Seller list for Paperback Graphic Books. Volume 3 was released in August 2015. Volume 4 was published in February 2016. Volume 5 was released in January 2017. Volumes 1–5 were also prominently featured in Top Cow's Humble Comics Bundle: Sex & Science.

Volume 6 (the first part of Mercy) was published in March 2019. Volume 7 was released in May 2021. Volume 8 was published May 15, 2024.

== Reception ==
The 8-issue series holds a critics' rating of 9.6 out of 10 at the review-aggregation website Comic Book Roundup, based on 22 reviews. Publishers Weekly, in a review for Vol. 1, praised its humor and humanity in its characters, but criticized the fact that it sometimes gets repetitive.

== See also ==
- LGBTQ themes in comics
- BDSM in culture and media
- Dominance and submission
