= Azrael (comic book) =

American comic book series

- Cover for Azrael #1 (February 1995), art by Barry Kitson and James Pascoe.

Publication information
- Publisher: DC Comics
- Schedule: Monthly
- Format: Ongoing series
- Genre: Superhero
- Publication date: (vol. 1); February 1995 - May 2003 (vol. 2); October 2009 - May 2011
- No. of issues: (vol. 1): 100 + 3 Annuals (vol 2): 18
- Main character(s): Jean-Paul Valley; Michael Lane

Creative team
- Created by: Denny O'Neil; Joe Quesada
- Written by: (vol. 1); Denny O'Neil (vol. 2); Fabian Nicieza
- Penciller(s): (vol. 1); Joe Quesada; Barry Kitson; Roger Robinson (vol. 2); Ramon Bachs; Guillem March

Azrael was an American comic book ongoing series, published by the comic book publishing company DC Comics based on the character Azrael. The name, inspired by the Judaic Angel of Death, is primarily associated with two characters: Jean-Paul Valley and Michael Lane. Valley was primarily featured between 1992 and 2003, while Lane was the star of a comics series which ran from 2009 to 2011.

== Publication history ==
=== Batman: Sword of Azrael ===
Azrael made his debut in a limited series called Batman: Sword of Azrael, in which he was introduced as a mild-mannered college student named Jean-Paul Valley, who becomes an assassin and acts on the will of a religious cult known as the Order of St. Dumas. His father, Ludovic Valley, had carried out the duties of the role until suffering severe gunshot wounds at the hands of a weapons-dealer named Carlton LeHah, at which point he was able to contact Jean-Paul and on his deathbed reveal that he had been brainwashing his son in preparation for the role of Azrael since birth, unbeknownst to Jean-Paul himself. Jean-Paul is then escorted by a dwarf named Nomoz to a property in Switzerland which belongs to the Order, where Jean-Paul is to be more fully prepared to assume the role his father had failed. Jean-Paul's entire personality disappears as soon as he places Azrael's helmet on his head, and he begins to believe he is an actual avenging angel, as opposed to a man dressed like one. He is sent by Nomoz on an assassination mission, but over the course of the mission Jean-Paul gradually gains more and more control over the Azrael mindset, which Nomoz calls "The System". At one point, he finds Batman in a life-threatening situation, and actually risks his own life to save Batman's. Nomoz is angered and claims "Azrael does not protect", to which Batman replies "Maybe this one does". Although Azrael is an assassin, Batman recognizes his potential as a crimefighter and attempts to dissuade him from taking lives. At the end of the series, Batman offers Jean-Paul the opportunity to join the Bat-Family and return to Gotham to be trained in the Batcave.

=== Knightfall, Knightquest, and KnightsEnd ===
Prior to Knightfall, Azrael has accepted Batman's offer and has been accompanying Robin on missions around Gotham City. When the villain Bane frees all the inmates from Arkham Asylum, Azrael assists with the clean-up effort. Batman eventually becomes so exhausted by fighting villains throughout the city that he is finally defeated by Bane in combat, and suffers a broken back in the process. After suffering such a severe injury, Batman realizes that he will not be able to carry on his duties as the protector of Gotham, but that Gotham needs a Batman, especially in the midst of a crime wave. Reasoning that the current Robin (Tim Drake) is too young to protect Gotham on his own, and that the original Robin (Dick Grayson) is now acting as Nightwing in the city of Blüdhaven and would be unwilling to return to Gotham to play the role of Batman, he turns to Jean-Paul and asks him to fill in as Batman, under one condition: He must avoid taking on Bane. Azrael agrees, and begins wearing the Batman costume while patrolling the city with Robin. Over time, Azrael begins to display a violent recklessness and a willingness for independence from Robin's guidance. Under the influence of "The System", Azrael designs vicious new gloves for the Batsuit, which feature sharp metal claws and a mechanism for launching Batarangs at high speed. Robin does not approve of the brutal fighting methods which Azrael is employing, and Azrael responds to the criticism by choking Robin and telling him he is no longer welcome in the Batcave. Now acting on his own, Azrael becomes increasingly violent and seems to be losing his sanity, experiencing hallucinations of his father and of St. Dumas himself. Azrael becomes quite conceited and believes himself superior to the original Batman, even directly disobeying Bruce's only condition by fighting Bane one-on-one, and actually manages to defeat him by utilizing an all-new Batsuit which features heavy armor and a Bat-signal spotlight on the chestplate. His defeat of Bane gives him a false confidence in his abilities, and erodes his conscience as he believes himself above any questions of morality as long as the job is getting done, leading him to actually begin killing villains. Bruce hears news of this from Tim Drake while assisting the Justice League with rescuing Drake's father, who had been abducted. Bruce is shocked and disgusted that the name of the Batman is being used this way, and determines he must return to Gotham and take the title back from Azrael. When he has finally recovered and trained his body back into physical fitness, he returns to Gotham and asks Azrael to give up the Batsuit. Azrael refuses, and they resort to combat. Bruce is finally able to defeat Azrael by forcing him to remove his mask, at which point the Jean-Paul Valley personality regains control and expresses contrition, acknowledging Bruce as the one true Batman. Bruce forgives him, but claims he can no longer trust him, so he cannot stay in the Batcave. Jean-Paul then leaves the Batcave in shame.

=== Azrael ===
The first Azrael ongoing series shows Azrael's (Jean-Paul Valley) battles against the Order of St. Dumas, and ran for 100 issues between February 1995 and May 2003. Following the events of Batman: Sword of Azrael and Batman: Knightfall, neither Jean-Paul nor Azrael is seen again in a comic book for several months until Jean-Paul finally re-appears as a homeless man wandering the streets of Gotham in a psychotic state. In Azrael #1, he successfully defends a fellow homeless man from an attack from several men who are attempting to take his shoes. When the man expresses gratitude, Jean-Paul reveals a state of confusion. The homeless man introduces himself as Dr. Brian Bryan, an unemployed alcoholic, and the self-proclaimed "worst psychiatrist in the world". Despite this admission, Bryan does what he can to try to help Jean-Paul return to a healthy mind, forming the basis of a friendship that will last for the duration of the series. Later, Bruce Wayne begins to feel guilt for abandoning Jean-Paul, and tracks him down in order to give him financial funding so that he can take care of himself. Acting on Bruce's suggestion, Azrael begins to more fully investigate his origins, returning to Europe to meet the Order of St. Dumas. After befriending a beautiful girl called Sister Lilhy who had been raised by the Order of St. Dumas, she helps him learn some of the secret background of the Order. He discovers that the Order of St. Dumas was a faction of Catholic knights that had splintered from the Knights Templar during the Crusades, and was named for their leader, a violent knight named Dumas, whom "no one else ever accused of being a saint". The Order had developed over the centuries into an extremist cult-like organization and had built a number of fortresses all over the world, where they conducted secretive genetic experiments and trained elite assassins. With the assistance of Lilhy and Bryan, Azrael tracks down one of the Order's main strongholds, and destroys it after reuniting with his former mentor Nomoz and inciting a riot by the Order's dwarves, who had been serving as slaves to the Order. While exploring the Order's fortress, he finds that he is one of a long line of genetically engineered Azraels, and that the Order has already replaced him with another Azrael since he has gone rogue. After returning to American soil, Azrael gradually rebuilds his relationship with Batman. Starting with issue #47, the series was retitled Azrael: Agent of the Bat and played a major role in the No Man's Land storyline.

Starting with issue #50, he changes to a considerably different costume, and experiments with a few other costumes, even briefly returning to a version of his Batman-style costume from Knightquest and KnightsEnd, before finally settling on his original costume in the final issues of the series. Azrael battles supposed hallucinations that are supposed to represent both his father and the creator of the order that spawned him, St. Dumas. Toward the end of the series, Azrael is plagued by apparently supernatural occurrences in the form of possible miracles.

Azrael is seemingly killed in the series' final issue, shot with two specially-coated bullets while battling archenemies Nicholas Scratch and Carlton Lehah. However, his body is never recovered. He makes an appearance during "Whatever Happened to the Caped Crusader?"; the story is out of continuity, or takes place on multiple different earths. The Blackest Night crossover features a resurrected Jean-Paul Valley, suggesting he did indeed die.

Three annual editions of Azrael (Azrael Annual) were also published, depicting other stories, such as the one of his father in Azrael Annual #1 (Year One).

=== Azrael: Death's Dark Knight ===
Azrael: Death's Dark Knight was a miniseries (written by Fabian Nicieza, with art by Frazer Irving, May - July 2009), taking place within the Battle for the Cowl storyline, in which an African-American ex-cop named Michael Washington Lane is approached by a religious sect called the Order of Purity to claim the mantle of Azrael after the Order's most recent Azrael went mad and killed an undercover police officer. When he takes this opportunity to serve his ideal of justice, he is offered three items by the Order of Purity: The Suit of Sorrows, The Sword of Sin, and The Sword of Salvation. Lane initially is told very little by the members of the Order of Purity, beyond that the Order of Purity is a secret religious order which had splintered from the Order of St. Dumas, which itself had splintered from the Catholic Church during the Crusades.

The Suit of Sorrows had been created by the Order of Purity to be used by their first Azrael, who had been intended as a rival to the Order of St. Dumas' enforcer of the same name. This suit of armor had at some point fallen into the hands of Ra's al Ghul, and remained in the possession of his League of Assassins for several centuries until Batman added it to his collection during the Resurrection of Ra's al Ghul storyline. The suit mysteriously vanished from the Batcave during the subsequent Batman: R.I.P. storyline, and shortly thereafter was returned to its original owners, the Order of Purity.

The Sword of Sin, Lane's preferred sword, was a sword of yellow flames which had the ability to bring to the minds of its victims memories of their sins and the guilt accompanying these sins.

The Sword of Salvation was a sword of blue ice which had the ability to coerce its victims into telling the truth, although it was unable to harm anyone who was innocent.

When the Order of Purity is attacked by seven assassins led by Talia al Ghul, Azrael dons the suit and takes up the swords in an effort to impede their mission to retake these items for Ra's al Ghul. The background and narrative that is outlined in the Azrael: Death's Dark Knight is expanded further by Nicieza in a two-part story written that crossed between Batman Annual #27 and Detective Comics Annual #11. In this story, the character teams up with Batman and Robin in an attempt to thwart an ancient demonic cult from sacrificing seven children in an effort to resurrect the embodiment of the eighth deadly sin.

=== Azrael (Volume 2) ===
The second Azrael ongoing series picks up where Death's Dark Knight left off, with former police officer Michael Lane now as the titular protagonist of the series. This series had a darker and more serious tone than the previous Azrael series, as it investigated deep philosophical themes such as morality versus justice, and "greater good" versus "absolute good". The first issue of the second ongoing series (Vol. 2) has a cover date of Dec '09 and was released in October 2009. During the course of this series, the history of the Order of Purity and the three mystical items which they have bestowed upon Lane is gradually revealed. Lane discovers that the Suit of Sorrows and the accompanying swords absorb part of the soul of every human that uses these items or is killed by them. Since these artifacts have been in use for several centuries, they contain a multitude of personalities, both good and evil, who communicate with Lane and appeal to him to act in different ways. This characteristic of the armor and swords has had the effect of causing every previous Azrael in the Order of Purity's history to have descended to insanity, although in varying lengths of time. Thus, Lane finds it increasingly difficult to resist these voices and maintain his mental health, especially as he was already struggling with symptoms of posttraumatic stress disorder, due to the violent deaths of most of his family members. Lane gradually loses trust in the Order of Purity as he discovers how much information they have been withholding from him. Lane's trust in his supervisors within the Order of Purity is further eroded after he learns that they deny some of the most fundamental tenets of the Christian religion, such as the divinity of Christ and his death and resurrection. Lane's faith in his traditional Catholic teachings as a child cause him to debate whether he should place his trust in such an organization that claims Jesus was still alive when he was removed from the cross and buried, or if he should betray them. He delays his decision and continues serving them as he attempts to apprehend a serial killer who is systematically murdering members of the Order of Purity in ways inspired by the martyrdom of several Christian saints. He remains loyal to the Order until he finally meets the man responsible for the murders, a devoutly religious metahuman called The Crusader, and realizes he has more in common with this man than with the Order. Azrael then joins forces with The Crusader on a mission to "cleanse" Gotham City of all its sinners, a la Sodom and Gomorrah. The series ended at issue #18 in May 2011, although the character Azrael remained active in other series such as Batman and Red Robin until October 2011.

In September 2011, The New 52 rebooted DC's continuity. In this new timeline, while the Azrael series has not returned, the Michael Lane Azrael has been re-introduced since, first appearing in issue #10 of Batman Incorporated (vol. 2) in June 2013.

== Collected editions ==
- Batman: No Man's Land Vol. 1 (Azrael: Agent of the Bat #51-55)
- Batman: No Man's Land Vol. 2 (Azrael: Agent of the Bat #56-57)
- Batman: No Man's Land Vol. 3 (Azrael: Agent of the Bat #58)
- Batman: No Man's Land Vol. 4 (Azrael: Agent of the Bat #59-61)
- Azrael: Death's Dark Knight (collects #1-3, Detective Comics Annual #11 and Batman Annual #27)
- Azrael: Angel in the Dark (collects Vol. 2 #1-6)
- Azrael: Killer of Saints (collects Vol. 2 #7-13) (cancelled)
- Batman: Gotham Shall Be Judged (collects Vol. 2 #14-18)

Title	Material collected	Publication date	ISBN
New Editions
Azrael Vol. 1: Fallen Angel	Batman: Sword of Azrael #1-4, Showcase '94 #10, and Azrael #1-7	March 2016	978-1401260606
Azrael Vol. 2: Requiem		July 2017	978-1401265472
Batman: Contagion	Azrael #15-16, Batman Vol. 1 #529, Batman Chronicles #4, Batman: Shadow of the Bat #48-49, Catwoman Vol. 2 #31-35, Detective Comics Vol. 1 #695-696, Robin Vol. 2 #27-30	March 2016	978-1401260682
Batman: Cataclysm	Azrael #40, Batman Vol. 1 #553-554, Batman Chronicles #12, Batman: Shadow of the Bat #73-74, Catwoman Vol. 2 #56-57, Detective Comics Vol. 1 #719-721, Robin Vol. 2 #52-53, Nightwing Vol. 2 #19-20, Batman: Blackgate - Isle of Men, Batman/Spoiler/Huntress: Blunt Trauma, Batman: Arkham Asylum - Tales of Madness	June 2015	978-1401255152
Batman: Road to No Man's Land Vol. 2	Azrael: Agent of the Bat #47-49, Batman Vol. 1 #560-562, Detective Comics Vol. 1 #727-730, Batman: Shadow of the Bat #80-82, The Batman Chronicles #15-16	July 2016	978-1401260637
Old Editions
Batman: Sword of Azrael	Batman: Sword of Azrael #1-4	June 1993	978-1563891007
Batman: Contagion	Azrael #15-16	April 1996	978-1563892936
Batman: Cataclysm	Azrael #40	June 1999	978-1563895272
