= Azrael (DC Comics) =

DC Comics superhero

- Jean-Paul Valley as Azrael. Art by Joe Quesada.

Publication information
- Publisher: DC Comics
- First appearance: As Azrael: Batman: Sword of Azrael #1 (October 1992); As Batman: Batman #489 (February 1993)
- Created by: Denny O'Neil; Joe Quesada

In-story information
- Alter ego: Jean-Paul Valley Jr.
- Species: Metahuman
- Team affiliations: Order of St. Dumas; Batman Family; Gotham Knights; Justice League Odyssey; Justice League Task Force; Justice League; The Colony
- Partnerships: Batman; Batwoman (Kate Kane); Batwing (Luke Fox); Cassandra Cain
- Notable aliases: Batman; The Avenging Angel
- Abilities: Enhanced physiology that grants him enhanced speed, strength, and stamina; Empathic powers to induce visions through touch; Expert assassin, hand-to-hand combatant, and sword fighter through an arcane-scientific physiological conditioning known as "The System"; Proficiency in computer operation, medicine and investigation; Access to St. Dumas technology and armor known as Suit of Sorrows, making him bulletproof and possessing an advanced AI that can detect the weaknesses within an opponent; Wields a flaming sword and wrist gauntlets

Azrael is an antihero and superhero appearing in American comic books published by DC Comics. The character was created by Denny O'Neil and Joe Quesada and debuted in Batman: Sword of Azrael #1 (October 1992). Both the original version and subsequent version are typically Christian assassins and vigilantes with a profound connection to a secret religious order derived from the Knight Templars.

The original version of the character is Jean-Paul Valley Jr. a college student who discovers he is from a long hereditary line of assassins and enforcers of the Order of St. Dumas, an extremist sect of the Knight Templars who employs "Azraels" by manipulating and grooming them at a young age to silence dissent among their ranks and as field operatives for their agent. Ultimately rejecting their agenda and dogma, he instead joins alongside Batman as one of the "extended" members of the Batman Family, protecting Gotham City and dismantling the order. The character once also served briefly as Batman during the events of the Knightfall storyline as a more brutal substitute for Batman after his back was broken by Bane. He was also a member of the Justice League Odyssey.

While Valley serves as the primary incarnation, other versions of the character exist; in the character's comic book death prior to The New 52, Michael Lane served in the role of Azrael. An African-American and former Gotham City police officer, he is trained secretly to replace Batman and is approached by the Order of Purity, a less violent off-shoot of the Order of St. Dumas, and became his successor. In current continuities, they serve in the role concurrently.

Both Jean-Paul Valley and Michael Lane have appeared in associated DC media. Additionally, an original iteration of the character appears in the second season of Gotham, portrayed by James Frain.

== Publication history ==
=== Creation and development ===
Writer Peter Milligan recounted about the creation of the character:

At that time I was writing the monthly Detective Comics title, and Alan Grant was writing Batman. For a number of reasons I wanted to come off Detective and [editor] Denny O'Neil and I had lunch together. I was just shooting my mouth off (as you do when someone's buying you lunch) and came up with a loose idea of what they should do. The story or character I came up with while stuffing Chinese food into my mouth eventually came to be Azrael. [...] Of course, it's one thing throwing some ideas around over lunch but another to fully realize a character and Azrael was ultimately the creation of those who came after me and are rightly credited with its creation.

Quesada spoke on the design process of the character:

"When I received the assignment I went that very same day to a military bookstore here in NYC called Sky Books, heck I don't even know if they're still around? Anyway, I picked up as many books as I could find on medieval warfare and knights and such and started my visual work there. All I was told by Denny and Archie with respect to art direction was that we needed an old Azrael and a new Azrael so when the son takes over the mantle. Oh, and Denny wanted a this guy to have a flaming sword!"

=== Publication in comic books ===
The character first appeared in the 1992 four-issue miniseries Batman: Sword of Azrael as Jean-Paul Valley. He then became a supporting character in the monthly Batman titles, eventually taking over the role of Batman through the "Knightfall", "Knightquest", and "KnightsEnd" story arcs. One of its creators, Denny O'Neil, admitted to having difficulties with Azrael's transition from villain to hero: "If I'd known he was to become a monthly character, I might have set him up differently. The problem is that I had to turn a bad guy into a real hero, not just an anti-hero or lead. It's possible to do that, but it's difficult to retain the original characterization. You almost have to change his personality".

O'Neil characterized Azrael as contrasting to Batman: "Bruce is very aware of what he is and how that contributes to what he does. He is not moved by internal or external forces that he doesn't already understand. Jean-Paul, on the other hand, has virtually no idea who he really is. He is, in the worst possible way, ignorant. Think about it: he had a rotten childhood he can barely remember; conversely, Bruce remembers his childhood, which was, up until that one critical moment, a very happy and privileged one – all too well. So they are at extreme opposite ends of the psychological spectrum." The subsequent Azrael series, chronicling Valley's battles against the Order of St. Dumas, ran for 100 issues between 1995 and 2003. O'Neil modeled the series on Arthurian legends, comparing Azrael's quest to discover the truth about himself to the Holy Grail. Starting with issue #47, it was retitled to Azrael: Agent of the Bat in an attempt to boost sales by tying the series in with the rest of the Batman mythos, including Azrael as part of the team of Batman, Robin, and the new Batgirl. Eventually, the character was killed off in the 100th issue of his series and would only make a handful of appearances in flashbacks and the Blackest Night storyline.

In 2007, Michael Lane was introduced as Azrael as part of the Battle for the Cowl, a storyline told in a three-issue miniseries format written by Fabian Nicieza. Over a decade after Valley's death, a re-invention of the character would emerge from Batman and Robin Eternal #10 in February 2016. The character would become a recurring character in several arcs of the Detective Comics title as part of the Gotham Knights team led by both Batman and Batwoman. In November 2018, Valley would also appear as a member of an incarnation of the Justice League team known as the Justice League Odyssey until its end in December 2020.

As part of the character's 30th anniversary, Valley is one of the characters featured in the Batman: Urban Legends title in late 2021 and early 2022. Subsequently, the character received a one-shot, Sword of Azrael: Dark Knight of the Soul and six-issue miniseries Sword of Azrael, which ran from late 2022 to early 2023.

== Fictional character biography ==
Jean-Paul Valley, a university graduate student of computer science in Gotham City, is unaware that he is the latest in a line of assassin-enforcers for the Order of St. Dumas, a sinister religious secret society. For most of his life, he has been brainwashed by The System, a deep level of psychological conditioning.

Valley only learned of his new status upon the death of his father, who was also his predecessor, at which time his conditioning was activated and he was called upon to become Azrael. When he was sent by the Order to kill weapons dealer Carlton LeHah, a rogue member of the Order who turned against the others and killed Valley's father, he crossed paths with Batman, who had been investigating the death. He worked with Alfred Pennyworth to find LeHah after he had captured Bruce Wayne, using the Batman costume to kill the other Order members. Valley worked with Alfred, demonstrating a detective's intuition in tracking LeHah's movements and later risking himself to rescue Bruce despite his traditional mission of vengeance. In doing so, he was shown the error of his ways and decided to fight alongside Batman against the criminals of Gotham, rejecting his "birthright" and seeking Batman's help in breaking his conditioning to forge his destiny. Valley is given a job as a security guard at WayneTech headquarters, and also becomes an apprentice crimefighter alongside Batman and Robin, learning basic detective work.

Valley plays a pivotal role in the Knightfall story arc (1993–1994), in which he stands in as Batman after Bruce Wayne is defeated and paralyzed by Bane. He decides that Bruce's tactics as Batman are obsolete and believes that he must fight criminals on their terms which makes him far more brutal and merciless, often even showing little regard for innocent bystanders. Against Bruce Wayne's orders, Valley fights and defeats Bane, wearing enhanced battle armor he designed and built under the influence of the System after he was narrowly defeated by Bane in their first confrontation. His performance as Batman is influenced by his Azrael conditioning. He grows increasingly violent and delusional, allowing the murderer Abattoir to fall to his death.

Initially, Wayne is impressed enough with Valley to let him remain Batman, but when Drake tells Wayne of Abattoir's death, he resolves to reclaim the Batman mantle. With his back repaired thanks to the sacrifice of psychic healer Shondra Kinsolving, Wayne confronts Valley to reclaim his identity. Valley refuses and attacks him, the confrontation eventually reaches its climax in the Batcave. Wayne knowing he cannot beat Jean Paul physically, tricks him into removing his armor, excluding his helmet, by leading him through one of the many tight caverns of the cave to the very spot where Bruce fell as a child, and by removing the plank that Wayne's father had installed, exposes Valley to bright sunlight, which snaps him out of his delusional state. Acknowledging Bruce Wayne as the true Batman, Valley apologizes and asks for his forgiveness, which Wayne accepts. Valley eventually returns to Gotham, regaining Wayne's trust.

Azrael is seemingly killed after being shot with two specially-coated bullets while battling LeHah. However, Azrael's body is never recovered, and his death went unconfirmed for several years of publication history. Azrael is revived as a Black Lantern during the Blackest Night storyline, which confirms him to have died.

=== The New 52 ===
Jean-Paul Valley's Azrael appearance in the New 52, art by Roge Antonio & Allen Passalaqua.

In The New 52 (a reboot of DC's continuity), Jean-Paul Valley was reintroduced in an arc of Batman & Robin: Eternal. His design was updated, with his main weapon being his sword rather than gauntlets. His character, however, was essentially the same, working as an enforcer for the Order of St. Dumas. In the comic, he defeated Bane and eventually turned on his handler and the Order to assist Red Hood and Tim Drake.

==== Grayson: Spyral's End ====
Azrael would make an appearance in the Grayson title in one of its annual issues as one of the few people to have encountered Agent 37 during their work, particularly in an incident where both Azrael and Agent 37 team up to stop the Order of St. Dumas from getting access to a mystical artifact able to have a direct communication line to people in Heaven. Azrael is revealed to have connections to the people of Khortamor, residing in a small village in Kahndaq. As Azrael and others are brought together by a "Jim Corrigan" looking to figure out the identity of Agent 37, Azrael's story along with others (John Constantine, Harley Quinn, and Simon Baz) allows them all to figure out his identity as Dick Grayson due to his personality. Corrigan is revealed to be a disguised Grayson using a technology called "Hypnos" and wipes their memory by using nanites he secretly gave to them during the meeting to preserve his secret.

=== DC Rebirth ===
In 2016, DC Comics would have a re-launch coined DC Rebirth of its entire line of ongoing monthly superhero comics, the initiative aiming to restore the DC Universe and have more of its story elements and characters more similar to their pre-Flashpoint portrayals. Jean-Paul Valley's appearances would be limited to the Detective Comics ongoing title starting with issue #934, making a few cameo appearances before joining the roster fully in issue #943 as a reoccurring character in the Gotham Knights team, a group of Bat-Family members led by Batman and Batwoman with a stricter adherence to Batman's rules.

==== "Batman: Detective Comics: Deus Ex Machina (Rebirth)" ====
In the "Deus Ex Machina" storyline, one of Valley's former associates, Nomoz, appears to him on the verge of death and the team takes him to the Belfry to treat the injured creature. Azrael explains to Batwoman, Orphan, Clayface, and Batwing his past, noting that Nomoz was the person responsible in the Order of St. Dumas for brutally training him in preparation for his eventual role as the Order's Azrael. In the present time, Nomoz had since been systematically targeted by a former associate of the Order who believed in guiding the order in a new direction and activates a powerful AI, Ascalon, that is dispatched to assassinate key members of the St. Dumas order. When the Gotham Knights team along with Zatanna encounter Ascalon, he confuses Valley for himself and reasserts his influence on Valley. Batwing would also reveal that Ascalon was formerly the AI present in the Suit of Sorrows responsible for the "programming" of Azrael, having studied it since Valley allowed him access to the Suit of Sorrows. Valley's encounter with Ascalon would reassert his old "programming" causing him to slowly regress to his original Azrael personality as the "System", the neurological programming in his mind overcomes him. In his former persona, Valley battles both Batwoman and Orphan while he battles the influence of the System and Ascalon. He is defeated due to the timely intervention of Zatanna and is placed in a different suit with a new guiding AI based on Batman to counter Ascalon's influence.

=== DC Universe (2017-present) ===
==== Justice League Odyssey (2018) ====
Azrael joined the new Justice League team Justice League Odyssey in 2018.

==== Batman: Urban Legends (2021-2023) ====
Azrael appears in volumes 8-10 of Batman: Urban Legends. Feeling as though he has lost sight of his mission and yearning to escape the teachings of St. Dumas, Jean-Paul Valley works in hospice during the day and protects the streets as Azrael during the night. After a meeting with Batman, Azrael finds the zombified corpse of the drug pusher Bullet-Tooth. Believing this is a sign of the Apocalypse, Azrael tracks down the last known location of the gangster, only to find a doctor synthesizing a resin from the Lazarus Pit.

Azrael is confronted by Poor Fellow, an angel from a separate sect of the Knights of Templar. Poor Fellow kills the doctor and reveals that she must kill blasphemers like the doctor and Azrael. Azrael almost kills Poor Fellow but backs out at the last moment. Poor Fellow scolds Azrael and disappears. This comic leads into the 2022-2023 Swords of Azrael series.

== Powers and abilities ==
Azrael is one of the few characters in the Batman family to have superpowers; like many within his family line, the Order of St. Dumas physically and psychologically trained him into the role through a process known as the "System", which uses a regime of hypnotic, prenatal conditioning, and genetic manipulation using animal DNA to turn potential candidates into loyal assassins and formidable fighters, granting them above-average strength, stamina, and martial arts prowess in unarmed and armed combat. This process is originally depicted as being rooted by alchemy but later attributes to technology derived from a Mother Box. He also possesses empathic powers that can induce painful visions and leaves foes catatonic via touch, referred to as the "Wrath of God".

However, the mental conditioning made Valley only access most of his skills while wearing the suit and gave him a more violent personality, which required him to learn to co-exist with them overtime. It also make his mental stability more vulnerable, being susceptible to manipulations by the Order of St. Dumas and chemicals such as Scarecrow's gas. At one point, both his mental state and physiology were damaged from exposure to toxic chemicals despite enhanced his powers further and was slowly killing him.

=== Equipment and resources ===
His original Azrael costume was a red and gold suit made of Kevlar, making it resistant to bullets and was outfitted with wrist gauntlets with retractable blades that can be engulfed in flames. In later continuities, he instead wears the Suit of Sorrows consisting of the same traits as the original suit. A special armor, it is equipped with a advanced AI (called Ascalon) that pinpoints the weakness within an opponent and enhances his original Azrael personality, making him a more dangerous fighter. The artificial intelligence could also usurp a current Azrael if it believed it too autonomous for the order's agenda. At one point, a new AI is built by Luke Fox based on Batman's best personality attributes, enabling him to battle against the dogma of St. Dumas without compromising his mental state. He also held a flaming sword called Murasame.

At a different point in time as "Agent of the Bat"; he donned silver and black armor with a red cape and a stylized red bat symbol on the chest. Later on, he dons red armor with golden gauntlets, boots, shoulder pads, blue cape. According to Scott Beatty, he implies that Azrael's changing costumes were reflections of the changes in Azrael's life from an agent of St. Dumas to an agent of Batman to his own man.

== Other versions ==
=== Michael Lane ===
- First appearance: Batman #665 (June 2007)
- Created by: Grant Morrison; Tony S. Daniel
- Teams: Gotham City Police Department; Order of Purity; Batman Incorporated; United States Marine Corps; Nighthawks; Batman Family
- Abilities: Advanced military and police training; wears the Suit of Sorrows, enhancing his physical attributes and memories. Wields the Sword of Sin and Salavation.
- Aliases: Bat-Devil; Bat-Ghost

Michael Lane as Azrael in ''Azrael'' (vol. 2) #14, art by Guillem March.

Michael Washington Lane is the second iteration of the Azrael character. He debuted in Batman #665 (June 2007) as the supervillain "Bat-Devil", before later taking on the identity of Azrael. Lane differs from Valley, being a assassin of a different off-shoot of the Order of St. Dumas and is African-American. In design, the character bears a white and red armored suit although some sources erroneously credit Lane's Azrael design to Valley.

A former college athlete until the dismissal of beating his coach, a former Marine, and former cop whose tragedies included the death of his young son at three years old, the suicide of his wife, and the death of his siblings form satanic cultists. While serving a joint military and GCPD secret program of creating a Batman replacement, he experience a mental breakdown from the aforementioned tragedies and is experimented on by Simon Hurt. After a time of working with Hurt, he is eventually approached by the Order of Purity to be their Azrael and comes into a conflict involving Nightwing and Talia alongside her forces over the death of an undercover officer and the ownership of his suit respectively. Ra's al Ghul later attempts to manipulate Lane into destroying Gotham by having him commit suicide and be subsequently resurrected by the Suit, which had been dipped in a Lazarus Pit. Lane worked with metahuman Crusader to 'judge' Batman (Dick Grayson), Catwoman, and Red Robin. Believing each to fail their respective "tests", Batman convinces Lane to use his swords to test himself, revealing Ra's plan and to foil his attempt at destroying Gotham and framing it on terrorists. Later, he is inducted into Batman Incorporated.

Unlike the first Azrael, Lane has no inherent superpowers. Due to his advanced military and police training, Lane is considered an excellent hand-to-hand combatant and is a skilled swordsman. In the past, Michael was also an accomplished football player and athlete. Lane also wears the original iteration of the Suit of Sorrows, the arcane armor created by the Order of Purity; it holds the memories of its prior bearers (including Batman) and grants them their skills, could revive its bearer similarly to a Lazarus pit, and holds other enhancements but risked making the user insane.

=== Ludovic Valley ===
Jean-Paul Ludovic Valley Sr. (or simply Ludovic Valley) is Jean-Paul Valley's father and predecessor. He was killed by Biis, a rogue member of the Order of St. Dumas who amassed a criminal empire by stealing funds from the order, but not before revealing on his deathbed to his son his origins. Post-Flashpoint, his history seems similar to prior but had instead created his son as a virtual clone and was seemingly stated to be killed after revealing his parentage to his son similarly to his prior history. However, it is instead revealed that he had somehow survived or was resurrected and sought to become a "saint" in his own right, purging the remaining members using advance artificial intelligence, Ascalon, to assassinate its members to "cleanse" it although Ascalon was ultimately foiled. However, his efforts impressed his new ally, Ra's al Ghul.

=== Elseworlds ===
An alternate depiction of Azrael is expected to appear in the 2027 Elseworlds limited series Green Lantern: Doomed Cosmos, created by Dan Watters and Kyle Hotz. This version of the character is not one person, but rather a type of soldier serving the intergalactic "Empire of Humanity" centuries after the Order of St. Dumas discovered a functioning mother box.

== In other media ==
=== Television ===
An original incarnation of Azrael, Theo Galavan, appears in the second season of Gotham, portrayed by James Frain. He is a billionaire industrialist, heir apparent of the Order of St. Dumas, brother of Tabitha Galavan, uncle of Silver St. Cloud, benefactor of a criminal group called the "Maniax", and later mayor of Gotham City. After being exposed and killed by Oswald Cobblepot and Jim Gordon, Theo is later revived by Hugo Strange, but is rendered insane and amnesiac. Under the belief that he is Azrael, an ancient immortal warrior who vanquished the Order's enemies, Strange gives Theo armor, a mask, and sword and tasks him with killing Gordon, only for Theo to be killed by Cobblepot and Butch Gilzean.

=== Film ===
- An original incarnation of Azrael, Pedro de Alvarado, appears in Aztec Batman: Clash of Empires, voiced by José Carlos Illanes.
- The Jean-Paul Valley incarnation of Azrael appears in Batman: Knightfall trilogy, voiced by Pablo Schreiber.

=== Video games ===
- The Jean-Paul Valley incarnation of Azrael appears as an unlockable playable character in the Nintendo DS version of Lego Batman: The Videogame.
- The Michael Lane incarnation of Azrael appears in the Batman: Arkham franchise, voiced by Khary Payton:
  - First appearing as a non-player character (NPC) in Batman: Arkham City, he observes Batman's work within the eponymous city prison. When Batman approaches Azrael, the latter warns him of the Order of St. Dumas' prophecy regarding Batman's end and promises that he will return before disappearing.
  - Azrael appears as a playable character in Batman: Arkham Knight. Amidst the Scarecrow's attack on Gotham City, he approaches Batman once more, claiming he wishes to succeed him. With Alfred Pennyworth's help, Batman tests and monitors Azrael. Upon learning from Batman the Order secretly implanted a microchip in Azrael's brain to control him and intend for him to kill Batman, Azrael will either follow through on or reject his mission. Depending on the player's choice, Azrael will either attack Batman, who defeats him and sees him arrested by the Gotham City Police Department, or destroy his sword and leave to exact revenge on the Order.
- The Michael Lane incarnation of Azrael appears as a playable character in the handheld versions of Lego Batman 2: DC Super Heroes.
- The Jean-Paul Valley and Michael Lane incarnations of Azrael appear as character summons in Scribblenauts Unmasked: A DC Comics Adventure.

=== Miscellaneous ===
The Jean-Paul Ludovic Valley and Jean-Paul Valley Jr. incarnations of Azrael appear in the Batman: Knightfall audio drama.

== Collected editions ==
- Batman: Sword of Azrael (#1-4) [1993] - ISBN 1-56389-100-X
- Azrael Vol. 1: Fallen Angel (Batman: Sword of Azrael #1-4, Showcase '94 #10, Azrael #1-7)
- Batman: Contagion (Azrael #15)
- Batman: No Man's Land Vol. 1 (Azrael: Agent of the Bat #51-55)
- Batman: No Man's Land Vol. 2 (Azrael: Agent of the Bat #56)
- Batman: No Man's Land Vol. 3 (Azrael: Agent of the Bat #58)
- Batman: No Man's Land Vol. 4 (Azrael: Agent of the Bat #59-61)
- Azrael: Death's Dark Knight (#1-3, Detective Comics Annual #11, Batman Annual #27)
- Azrael: Angel in the Dark (Azrael (vol. 2) #1-6) [2010] - ISBN 978-1-4012-2874-3
- Azrael: Killer of Saints (Azrael (vol. 2) #7-13) (cancelled)
- Batman: Gotham Shall Be Judged (Azrael (vol. 2) #14-18) [2012] - ISBN 978-1-4012-3378-5
