= Darkchylde =

- Ariel Chylde pictured on the cover of Darkchylde issue #1

Publication information
- Publisher: Maximum Press; Homage Comics (Wildstorm/Image Comics); Darkchylde Entertainment
- First appearance: Glory/Angela: Angels in Hell #1 (April 1996)
- Created by: Randy Queen

In-story information
- Full name: Ariel Chylde

Darkchylde is an American comic book character created in 1996 by Randy Queen. It was originally published by Maximum Press, and later by Image Comics, through Homage Comics, a publishing imprint of Wildstorm. Subsequent projects would be published by Darkchylde Entertainment, through Wowio.

Darkchylde is the story of Ariel Chylde, a cursed teen who can become the creatures from her many nightmares, and then must save her small town from the forces of darkness she's set free.

== Publication history ==
Darkchylde was launched as a comic book property in June 1996 where it was to be published as a five-issue miniseries via Maximum Press, the publisher founded by Rob Liefeld following his departure from Image Comics.

After publishing the book through issue #3, Liefeld announced his company would be shifting away from "darker themed" books with Darkchylde being among the titles dropped from publication. According to creator Randy Queen, Liefeld often disagreed with the directions Queen opted to take with Darkchylde and felt that was a motivating factor in Maximum dropping publication. After being dropped by Maximum, Queen fielded multiple offers from interested publishers including Chaos! Comics, but ultimately Queen decided that Image were the best fit. Image began publishing the book at issue #4 and promoted its release with a five-page preview in Spawn #56.

In November 1997, Queen announced plans to do a new bi-monthly Darkychylde series with a new issue #1 for January 1998. Darkchylde: The Legacy ultimately missed its intended release and instead premiered in September 1998 and was the 11th highest order book of comic retailers in spite of the lengthy gap between releases.

In an interview with Nicholas Yanes from scifipulse.net Queen revealed that Darkchylde would appear in a published comic book after several years of absence. This comic book would be a one-shot crossover titled The Darkness/Darkchylde: Kingdom Pain, released in December 2009. In addition to containing a new story feature Darkchylde, this one-shot also contained preview art for Randy Queen's next comic book title "Starfall".

=== Manga Darkchylde ===
In 2005 the title was relaunched at Dark Horse Comics as Manga Darkchylde, with Ariel now being a little girl. The term manga in the title is somewhat misleading, as the new series is clearly not a manga in the traditional sense and actually bears very little resemblance to Japanese manga in any way. Only using the base elements of the original Darkchylde, Randy Queen is now expanding his "Darkchylde-universe".

== Issues ==
Darkchylde comic books, in order of reading:

- Darkchylde Diary
- Darkchylde #1–5
- Spawn #56 (4-page Darkchylde interlude featuring Flatulance)
- Darkchylde #0
- Darkchylde ½
- Darkchylde: The Legacy #1–3
- Darkchylde: Redemption ½, #1,2
- Dreams of the Darkchylde #1–6
- Darkchylde Last Issue Special
- Painkiller Jane/Darkchylde (drawn by J. G. Jones)
- Witchblade/Darkchylde
- The Darkness/Darkchylde: Kingdom of Pain
- Darkchylde Swimsuit Illustrated
- Darkchylde Summer Swimsuit Spectacular
- Darkchylde Sketchbook
- Manga Darkchylde #0, 1–2

=== Collected editions ===
Some of the comics have been collected into trade paperbacks:

- Darkchylde: The Descent (collects the original miniseries and the Spawn interlude, WildStorm/Homage Comics, 1998)
- Darkchylde, Volume 1: Legacy and Redemption (collects Darkchylde: Legacy #1/2 & 1-3, and Darkchylde: Redemption #1/2 & 1, 2) (160 pages, January 2011, ISBN 978-1-60706-352-0)
- Darkchylde: Dreams of Darkchylde (collects Dreams of the Darkchylde #1-6) (June 2011, ISBN 978-1-60706-388-9)

== Adaptations ==
=== Novel ===
Darkchylde was turned into a Young Adult Novel by Andrea Brown Literary Agency. Queen completed the first of a series of long awaited novels titled Darkchylde: The Ariel Chylde Saga in 2015.

=== Film ===
In December 1998, it was reported that unnamed studios were interested in using Darkchylde as the basis for a live-action film.

In August 2007 creator Randy Queen revealed to Newsarama that a film was in the works.

In an interview with Nicholas Yanes from scifipulse.net, Randy Queen was asked and responded to a question about a film/television adaptation of Darkchylde:

Yanes: For years now there have been rumors of Darkchylde being turned into an animated series, miniseries for a cable network and movie. Are you able to comment on Darkchylde's potential future on in television and film? Any actresses you'd love to play Ariel? Queen: A movie makes so much sense it's ridiculous, and all I can say is that we are working on it. I know that's a frustrating answer for fans, but it's a frustrating process. It's probably best for me not to comment on actresses, so we'll just all have to wait and see.

Test footage from the set of Darkchylde emerged in July 2010 and on October 31, John Carpenter was hired to direct. The project has since seen no further comment from Carpenter or Queen, and is believed to be in development hell or shelved by the production company.

== Tumblr depictions and subsequent DMCA takedown notices ==
In August 2014, Randy Queen, owner of the character, filed numerous DMCA Takedown Requests regarding Escher Girls, a Tumblr blog which critiques the anatomical inaccuracies of women featured in comic art. The notices were filed in response to posts critical of Queen's work, specifically a piece of art published on the blog nine times with encouragement for others to correct it with redraws - a piece of art created 18 years ago while the artist was still learning. Queen felt his work was being used in an abusive and misleading manner, and exercised due process with Tumblr in having his copyrighted images removed from the blog. Tumblr erroneously removed the entire post, which included commentary. Subsequently, Queen apologized on his Facebook page regarding the incident and asked Tumblr to restore the content, which they did.
