= Justice League =

DC Comics superhero team

- The original members of the Justice League, from left to right: Green Lantern, the Flash, Superman, Batman, Wonder Woman, Aquaman and the Martian Manhunter. Art by Alex Ross.

Publication information
- Publisher: DC Comics
- First appearance: The Brave and the Bold #28 (March 1960)
- Created by: Gardner Fox

In-story information
- Base(s): The Hall; Watchtower; Satellite; Secret Sanctuary; Detroit Bunker; The Refuge; JLI Embassies

Roster

The Justice League, or Justice League of America (JLA), are a group of superheroes appearing in American comic books published by DC Comics. The team first appeared in The Brave and the Bold #28 (March 1960). Writer Gardner Fox conceived the team as a revival of the Justice Society of America, a similar team from DC Comics from the 1940s which had been pulled out of print due to a decline in sales. The Justice League is an all-star ensemble cast of established superhero characters from DC Comics' portfolio. Diegetically, these superheroes usually operate independently but occasionally assemble as a team to tackle especially formidable villains. This is in contrast to certain other superhero teams such as the Doom Patrol or Marvel’s X-Men whose characters were created specifically to be part of the team, with the team being central to their identity. The cast of the Justice League usually features a few highly popular characters who have their own solo books, such as Superman, Batman, and Wonder Woman, alongside several lesser-known characters who benefit from exposure.

The Justice League was created to boost the profiles and sales of these characters through cross-promotion and helped develop the DC Universe as a shared universe, as it is through teams like the Justice League that the setting's characters regularly interact with each other.

Beyond comic books, the Justice League has been adapted to television shows, films, and video games.

== Publication history ==
Since 1960, the Justice League has appeared in comic books published by DC Comics (periodicals and graphic novels). These comic books constitute the bulk of Justice League fiction.

=== Silver Age and Bronze Age (1960–1985) ===
The Brave and the Bold #28 (March 1960), their first appearance. Superman and Batman do not appear on the cover, but do appear in the story within.

In its inception, the Justice League was a revival of the Justice Society of America, created by editor Sheldon Mayer and writer Gardner Fox in 1940. After World War II, superheroes fell out of popularity, which led to the cancellation of many characters, including the Justice Society, which last appeared in All-Star Comics #57 (March 1951). A few years later, sales rose again, and DC Comics revived some of these retired characters, reinventing a few of them in the process. Editor Julius Schwartz asked writer Gardner Fox to reintroduce the Justice Society of America. Schwartz decided to rename it the "Justice League of America" because he felt "League" would appeal better to young readers, evoking sports organizations such as the National League. The Justice League of America debuted in The Brave and the Bold #28 (March 1960), and after two further appearances in that title, got its own series, which quickly became one of the company's best-selling titles. This led DC Comics to create other superhero teams, such as the Teen Titans. Marvel Comics, a rival comic book publisher, noticed the Justice League's success and created the Avengers and the Fantastic Four.

The initial Justice League lineup included seven of DC Comics' superheroes who were regularly published at that time: Superman, Batman, Aquaman, the Flash, Green Lantern, the Martian Manhunter, and Wonder Woman. Fox also created a new, non-superhero character called Snapper Carr that was intended to represent DC's teenage readership and joined the League as an Honorary member in their debut story. While Superman and Batman were included in the Justice League's initial lineup, they were largely absent from the League's early stories, playing only minor roles as the pair were already starring together in DC's World's Finest Comics and Fox was worried the two more famous heroes would detract attention from their less popular teammates. As the series went on however, Superman and Batman became more and more present as readers increasingly demanded to see more of them in the League's stories. The team roster would quickly expand with the Green Arrow, the Atom and Hawkman being added to the team over the next four years.

In the Justice Society stories from the 1940s (in All-Star Comics), the Justice Society was used more as a framing device for its members' solo adventures. The stories tended to have the following structure: the Justice Society meets to discuss some new menace, they split up to undertake individual missions that somehow connect to that menace, and finally regroup for the showdown with the main villain. In the 1940s, most comic books were anthologies, and All-Star Comics was in practice not a major deviation from that. By contrast, the Justice League worked together more closely in their stories, thereby having a stronger identity as a team.

In another change from the Justice Society stories of the 1940s, Batman and Superman were regular members of the cast, not mere "honorary members" who made occasional cameos.

Justice League of America #21 (August 1963) featured the first crossover story in which the Justice League meets and teams up with the Justice Society of America. In doing so, DC Comics brought back a number of legacy characters such as Doctor Fate and the Black Canary. The issue was a hit with readers and such crossovers became a recurring event.

Justice League of America (vol. 1) was published from 1960 to 1987.

=== Detroit era (1984–1986) ===
From the Justice League's inception in 1960 until 1984, the team's roster always included a number of A-list characters to draw in readers, such as Wonder Woman and Superman. But in Justice League of America Annual #2 (October 1984), the Justice League was revised to entirely comprise more obscure characters such as Vixen, Vibe, and the Martian Manhunter. The original A-list members would not be brought back into the cast until 1986. The motives behind this change were to dispense with the convoluted continuities of the classic characters by using lesser-known and new characters, thus giving the writers more flexibility to write character-driven stories; and to give the team a more youthful, hipper feel similar to that of the Teen Titans and the X-Men, which were selling better. The cast was multicultural: Vibe was Latino, and Vixen was Black. However, the writing of Vibe and Gypsy was criticized for using clichés of their ethnic groups, symptomatic of writers who were well-meaning but out of touch, something for which said writers (Gerry Conway and Chuck Patton) later expressed regret. This era of the Justice League, which lasted about two years, is popularly known as "Justice League Detroit" because they were headquartered in Detroit.

=== Justice League International and its spin-offs (1986–1996) ===
The 1986 company-wide crossover "Legends" concluded with the formation of a new Justice League. The new team was dubbed the "Justice League," then "Justice League International" (JLI) and was given a mandate with less of an American focus. The Justice League International was recognized by the United Nations as a political entity and established "embassies" all over the world. The new series was character-driven and had a quirky, humorous tone which proved popular with readers. Numerous spin-off teams such as Justice League Europe, Extreme Justice, and Justice League Task Force were created. In 1996, these series were cancelled due to low sales.

The Justice League International featured characters that had previously not been part of the DC Universe, which had been absorbed from the portfolios of other publishers that DC Comics had purchased. These included Captain Atom and the Blue Beetle, which were created for Charlton Comics in the 1960s. In 1983, DC Comics purchased Charlton Comics and, a few years later, integrated the Blue Beetle and Captain Atom into the DC Universe. Captain Marvel, originally from the Fawcett Comics universe, was similarly integrated.

=== JLA (1996–2006) ===
The cancellation of the aforementioned spin-off books prompted DC to revamp the League as a single team in a single title. A new Justice League of America was launched in a September 1996 miniseries Justice League: A Midsummer's Nightmare by Mark Waid and Fabian Nicieza, which returned to the classic cast. In 1997, DC Comics launched a new book titled JLA. Grant Morrison wrote JLA for the first four years, and they gave the book an epic feel by making the Justice League an allegory for a pantheon of gods, and in their stories they regularly fought villains who threatened the entire world or even the entire cosmos. The ongoing series began its monthly run in January 1997, and concluded in April 2006 after 126 issues.

This series utilized a "back-to-basics" approach by shifting the focus back on the team's original and most famous seven members (or their successors): Superman, Batman, Wonder Woman, Aquaman, the Flash (Wally West), Green Lantern (Kyle Rayner), and the Martian Manhunter. Additionally, the team received a new headquarters, the "Watchtower", based on the Moon. JLA quickly became DC's best-selling title, a position it enjoyed on and off for several years.

=== Volume 2 (2006–2011) ===
The Justice League books continued the trend set by the JLA era: world-shaking threats with epic stakes, with a focus on plot over character development, and strong tie-ins to all the company's crossover events. In 2006, DC began an ongoing comic series titled Justice League of America (vol. 2).

=== New 52 (2011–2016) ===
In The New 52 era, further changes to the retroactive continuity of the DC Universe were made, such as Cyborg, one of DC's premier African American heroes, becoming a founding member of the team. In 2011, DC Comics also released a spin-off title called Justice League Dark, which is an ensemble team of prominent magic users of the DC Universe, such as John Constantine, Zatanna, Madame Xanadu, and Swamp Thing.

=== DC Rebirth (2016–2017) ===
A new volume of Justice League was launched as part of the DC Rebirth initiative, written by Bryan Hitch.

In 2017, following Justice League vs Suicide Squad, a new volume of Justice League of America was published featuring Batman, Black Canary, The Atom, Vixen, The Ray, Lobo, and Killer Frost. This series was written by Steve Orlando and published concurrently with Justice League.

=== New Justice (2018–2021) ===
In the New Justice era, the fourth volume of the Justice League begins its run, and continues into the following Infinite Frontier era.

A connected new title Justice League: No Justice emerged and ran for four issues, taking place shortly after Dark Nights: Metal. Furthering focus on the aftermath is a following title called Justice League Odyssey that established its 25-issue run from 2018 to 2020. Continuing to deal with the concerns of the Source Wall being broken, Cyborg, Starfire, Green Lantern Jessica Cruz, and Azrael are lured by Darkseid into a newly inhabited area in outer space named the Ghost Sector. The title was created by Scott Snyder, Joshua Williamson, James Tynion IV and Francis Manapul.

A second volume of Justice League Dark was announced, and ran regularly for 29 issues from July 2018 to February 2021. Being led by Wonder Woman, the team members include John Constantine, Zatanna, Swamp Thing, Man-Bat, Detective Chimp, Doctor Fate, and briefly Animal Man.

=== Infinite Frontier (2021–2023) ===
The fourth volume of the definitive Justice League title continues well into the Infinite Frontier era and reaches a conclusion with a total of 75 issues in June 2022. Despite not having a title run during the Infinite Frontier era, the team from Justice League Dark would continue to appear as a backup feature in the mainline Justice League series during the Dark Crisis story arc, from issue #59 in May 2021 to issue #71 in March 2022, with guest appearances throughout issues #72 to 74.

Also sharing a tie to Dark Crisis is Justice League Incarnate. Consisting of a different team, the five-issue title shortly ran from January 2022 to May 2022 Some pivotal members are Superman of Earth 23, Flashpoint Batman, Mary Marvel of Earth 5, Captain Carrot of Earth 26, among others, including their own Flash, Green Lantern and Wonder Woman, plus a new character by the name of Doctor Multiverse.

=== Dawn of DC (2023–2024) ===
Following the events of Dark Crisis, the Justice League was brought back from the dead. This inspired Amanda Waller to take action against all metahumans, believing that they have become too powerful. With the Justice League going on hiatus as a team, the Titans step forward to become the DC universe's premier superhero team, led by Nightwing. The Titans are now located in Blüdhaven with their new Titans Tower being rebuilt over an old prison, which was destroyed following a prison breakout, led by the villain Heartless.

=== DC All In (2024–present) ===
For DC's DC All In aimed at providing a jumping on point for new readers, a new Justice League series Justice League Unlimited debuted, written by Mark Waid and illustrated by Dan Mora. During the preceding storyline Absolute Power, Amanda Waller created a group of Amazo robots to steal the powers of metahumans around the world. Though the Amazos were destroyed and the powers returned to their owners, the Justice League's members agreed to work closer together to prevent such an event from happening again. The League enlisted the majority of the world's heroes as members, stationed in a new Watchtower orbiting Earth.

=== Inter-company crossovers ===
The Justice League has on a few occasions appeared in crossover stories with superhero characters from rival publishers such as Marvel Comics and Dark Horse Comics. In general, such inter-company crossovers are rare because a lot of resources must be spent in sorting out the legal issues and corporate politics of the two companies, and due to licensing issues, they cannot create spin-off merchandise and media, which all reduce the profitability of such projects.

The last crossover between DC Comics and Marvel Comics was JLA/Avengers, which they jointly published in 2003. Now that Marvel Comics and DC Comics are part of major multimedia corporations (Disney and Warner Brothers, respectively), those aforementioned hurdles are even more complicated, which makes another project like JLA/Avengers much less likely. In 2017, Dan Didio remarked that DC Comics and Marvel are very competitive toward each other and only did crossovers when their sales were low. However, DC Comics did go on to feature the Justice League in crossovers with smaller companies such as Dark Horse Comics, such as a crossover with Black Hammer in 2019.

In 2025, the Justice League was featured in the five-issue-miniseries DC X Sonic the Hedgehog, written by Ian Flynn. The miniseries features the League (consisting of Superman, Batman, Wonder Woman, Green Lantern (John Stewart), the Flash and Cyborg) teaming up with Sonic and his friends (Miles "Tails" Prower, Amy Rose, Knuckles the Echidna, Silver the Hedgehog and Shadow the Hedgehog) when Darkseid invades their universe for the Chaos Emeralds. Additionally, Sonic and his friends also become their version of the League while taking the monikers of their partners; Sonic suiting up as the Flash, Tails donning and armor resembling Cyborg's components, Amy wearing a dress resembling Wonder Woman's, Silver donning a Green Lantern Ring and costume, Knuckles wearing a Superman costume, and Shadow donning a Batman suit. Other members include Mister Terrific, Hawkgirl and Supergirl.

== Fictional history ==
=== Members ===
The members of the Justice League are heroes who normally operate independently but who occasionally team up to tackle especially formidable villains. This is in contrast to teams such as the X-Men or the Fantastic Four, who normally operate as a team and for whom the team is central to their identity.

Most versions of the Justice League feature a select cast of highly popular characters from the DC Comics portfolio, such as Superman, Batman and Wonder Woman, to attract readers with their star power; and they often co-feature a few lesser-known characters who benefit from exposure, such as Cyborg or Black Canary. DC Comics has in several periods deviated from this formula, most notably in the late 1980s and early 1990s with books such as Justice League International, which deliberately featured a cast of lesser-known characters. The advantage of this was that lesser-known characters are not burdened by convoluted continuities, which gave writers more creative flexibility to write character-driven stories. This was done to emulate the model of Marvel Comics' X-Men comic books, whose stories were more character-driven and which favored more obscure or new characters.

The Justice League is an independent group, although it usually accepts some constraints from the U.S. government or the United Nations so as to receive their sanction. Particularly in the early decades of publication, DC Comics was keen for its superheroes to be perceived as law-abiding because children were the main audience. The cast is rarely more than a dozen people in size so as to give a reasonable and equal time for each character. While sometimes the League is shown to have a designated chairperson or leader, there is otherwise no hierarchy; they are a small band of equals who make major decisions, such as inducting new members, by vote.

=== Headquarters ===
The Justice League operates out of a headquarters. In the 1960s, their headquarters was secretly in a hollowed-out mountain outside the fictional town of Happy Harbor in Rhode Island. In Justice League of America #78 (1970), they moved to a satellite. In the Super Friends franchise, the Justice League operated out of the Hall of Justice located in Washington, D.C. During the brief "Justice League Detroit" era, they were headquartered in a repurposed bomb shelter in Detroit. In the JLA comic book which ran from 1997 to 2006, their headquarters was on the Moon and called "the Watchtower". The centerpiece of the headquarters is a conference table around which the Justice League discusses menaces to deal with. The satellite and Moon base headquarters are equipped with teleporters for those members who cannot fly to it.

=== Villains ===
The Legion of Doom was created for the Challenge of the Superfriends animated TV series as a villainous counterpart to the Justice League. In that original incarnation, it consisted of established villains associated with each of the Justice League's members; e.g., Lex Luthor for Superman, Riddler for Batman, Sinestro for Green Lantern, Black Manta for Aquaman, Gorilla Grodd for the Flash, and Cheetah for Wonder Woman. The Legion of Doom, or some variant of it, has since appeared in other TV shows and comic books.

=== Alternate versions ===
Due to the nature of the DC Multiverse, the Justice League has had many alternate universe depictions appear throughout its history. Some are morally-inverse supervillain teams, such as the Crime Syndicate of America from Earth-3, a team consisting of villainous versions of the mainline heroes who the League have fought frequently. There are also many versions of the League set in different time periods, such as the Wild West-themed Justice Riders of Earth 18, the medieval League of Earth 118 from Dark Knights of Steel, and various incarnations set in the far future such as the Justice Legion Alpha of the 853rd century and Justice League 3000. Other more unique examples include the Jurassic League, dinosaur versions of the League, the gender-inversed Justice Guild of Earth-11, and the Justice Titans of Earth-41, a cross of the League and the Teen Titans consisting of fusions of various characters.

In the Absolute Universe, a universe where superheroes are treated like underdogs, the Justice League consists of influential figures Veronica Cale, the Joker, Ra's al Ghul, Elenore Thawne, and Hector Hammond, who believe that their control over the world is the natural order and upholding it is "justice". At NYCC 2026, an Absolute Justice crossover event was announced for release in 2027 and is expected to depict the meeting of the core Absolute heroes including Batman, Wonder Woman, Superman, John Jones and the Martian, Green Lantern (Jo Mullein) and Flash (Wally West).

== Cultural impact ==
Most of the characters that appear in DC Comics' books are set in the same fictional universe, known as the DC Universe. They occasionally make guest appearances in each other's solo books, and more regularly in team books such as Justice League. Such crossovers encouraged readers to buy other books in the DC Comics catalogue, and readers became engrossed not just in the individual characters but in their web of relationships across the broader setting, thereby building brand loyalty. Marvel Comics copied this idea by creating a number of superhero teams of its own, the closest analogue being the Avengers, so as to promote and develop the Marvel Universe. Some readers focused their attention on just one of these two comic book universes, as they were both large and did not overlap. Thus, the superhero fandom developed sub-communities of DC devotees and Marvel devotees.

== Awards ==
The original Justice League of America series won two 1961 Alley Awards in the categories "Best Comic Book" and "Best Adventure-Hero Group." In 1963, the series won "Favorite Novel" ("Crisis on Earth-One/Crisis on Earth-Two" in Justice League of America #21–22 by Gardner Fox and Mike Sekowsky) and "Strip that Should Be Improved." There also an award specific to the series, "Artist Preferred on Justice League of America," that was won by Murphy Anderson.

== Theme park attractions ==
=== Justice League: Alien Invasion 3D ===
Justice League: Alien Invasion is an interactive dark ride at Warner Bros. Movie World on the Gold Coast, Australia. In the ride, guests board vehicles equipped with blasters as they join the Justice League in the fight against Starro, who has mind-controlled the citizens of Metropolis.

=== Justice League: Battle for Metropolis ===
Justice League: Battle for Metropolis is an interactive dark ride at seven Six Flags parks across the United States and Mexico. In the ride, Lex Luthor and the Joker have captured Supergirl, Wonder Woman, Green Lantern, and Flash, and it is up to the combined forces of the remaining members of the Justice League and the Justice League Reserve Team to save them from their capture at LexCorp. Guests board motion-enhanced and stun blaster-equipped vehicles designed by A.R.G.U.S. as they ride through Metropolis and join the fight against the henchmen of Lex Luthor and the Joker.

== See also ==
Affiliations and spin-off groups

- Avengers
- Extreme Justice
- Justice League 3000
- Justice League Dark
- Justice League Elite
- Justice League Europe
- Justice League International
- Justice League Queer
- Justice League Task Force
- Justice League United
- Justice Leagues
- Legion of Super-Heroes
- Legion of Super-Pets
- Squadron Supreme
- Super Buddies
- Super Friends
- Green Lantern Corps
- Teen Titans
- Young Justice

== Sources ==
- Andrew Hickey (2011). An Incomprehensible Condition: An Unauthorised Guide To Grant Morrison's Seven Soldiers. Lulu.com. ISBN 9781447780021.
- Roz Kaveney (2008). Superheroes!: Capes and Crusaders in Comics and Films. Bloomsbury Academic. ISBN 9781845115692.
