= Joe Quesada =

American comic book artist and writer (born 1962)

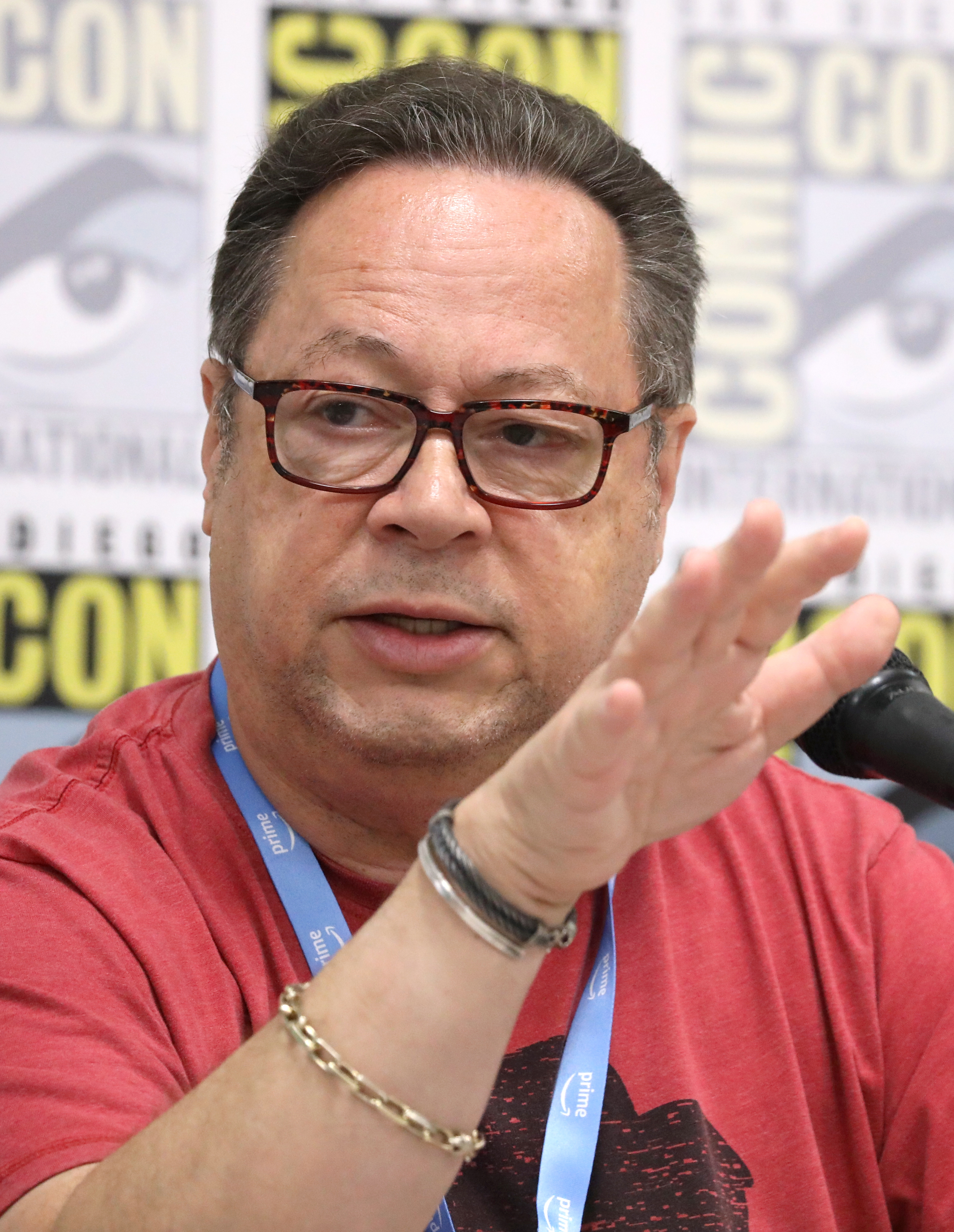
- Quesada at the 2023 San Diego Comic-Con
- Born: Joseph Quesada; January 12, 1962 (age 64) New York City, U.S.
- Areas: Writer, Penciller, Editor
- Awards: 1993 Diamond Gem Award for Best Cover; Inkpot Award (2014)
- Spouse: Nanci Quesada
- Children: 1

Joseph Quesada (/kəˈsɑːdə/; born January 12, 1962) is an American comic book artist, writer, editor, and television producer. He became known in the 1990s for his work on various Valiant Comics books, such as Ninjak and Solar, Man of the Atom. He also worked on numerous books for DC Comics and Marvel Comics, such as Batman: Sword of Azrael and X-Factor, before forming his own company, Event Comics, where he published his creator-owned character, Ash.

In 1998 he became an editor of Marvel Comics' Marvel Knights line, before becoming editor-in-chief of the company in 2000. He was named chief creative officer of Marvel Entertainment in 2010 and left his editor-in-chief role in January 2011, being replaced by Axel Alonso. His position was re-titled as executive vice president and creative director in October 2019. He left the company in 2022.

== Early life ==
Quesada was born in New York City to Cuban-born parents, and grew up in the Jackson Heights neighborhood of Queens, 15 blocks from Shea Stadium, which his father helped build as part of the construction crew. The first comic book he became an ardent fan of was The Amazing Spider-Man, which he began reading around issue #98, the last issue of a historic anti-drug storyline, which garnered his father's approval. As the character resonated with him (in part because both grew up in Queens), Spider-Man remains a character he particularly enjoys drawing.

Quesada majored in illustration at the School of Visual Arts, from which he graduated with a BFA in 1984. Though he had drifted away from comics, having come to think of them as a child's medium, his interest in them was renewed at age 25 when a friend who learned of his interest in art showed him Frank Miller's The Dark Knight Returns.

== Career ==
=== Writer and artist ===
Quesada's comics career began in 1990 when he was hired by DC Comics on the basis of his 12-page portfolio, which was composed of three three-page sequences, plus a cover for each. These included a Superman story intended to show reviewers from DC Comics that he could handle their characters; an X-Men sequence to display both his ability to depict the characters of Marvel Comics and his ability to handle groups of characters; and a vignette of two people having coffee, which Quesada included to show his ability to illustrate non-superhero stories.

Among Quesada's earliest widely distributed work was for Valiant Comics, specifically penciled interiors and covers for Ninjak, Solar, Man of the Atom and others. His art was heavily influenced by Alex Toth, Mike Mignola, and Alphonse Mucha. At DC Comics, he and writer Jack C. Harris co-created an updated version of the Golden Age character The Ray. Quesada co-created the character Azrael with writer Dennis O'Neil for the 1992 Batman: Sword of Azrael miniseries.

Later, Quesada and his inking partner Jimmy Palmiotti, formed a publishing company, Event Comics, and co-created Ash, a firefighter with superpowers. Quesada cites his editorial experience with Event, and the creators he formed relationships with during that period as that which best prepared him for the later role of Marvel's editor-in-chief.

=== Marvel Comics ===
==== Marvel Knights ====
In 1998, Marvel Comics, which had just filed for Chapter 11 bankruptcy, asked Quesada to work for Marvel in a more exclusive capacity, and contracted him and his partners to produce a line of Marvel books dubbed Marvel Knights. As editor of Marvel Knights, Quesada worked on a number of low-profile characters such as Daredevil, Punisher, The Inhumans, and Black Panther, encouraging experimentation and using his contacts in the independent comics world to bring in creators such as David W. Mack, Mike Oeming, Brian Michael Bendis, Garth Ennis, and Steve Dillon. Quesada also illustrated a Daredevil story written by film director Kevin Smith.

==== Editor-in-chief ====
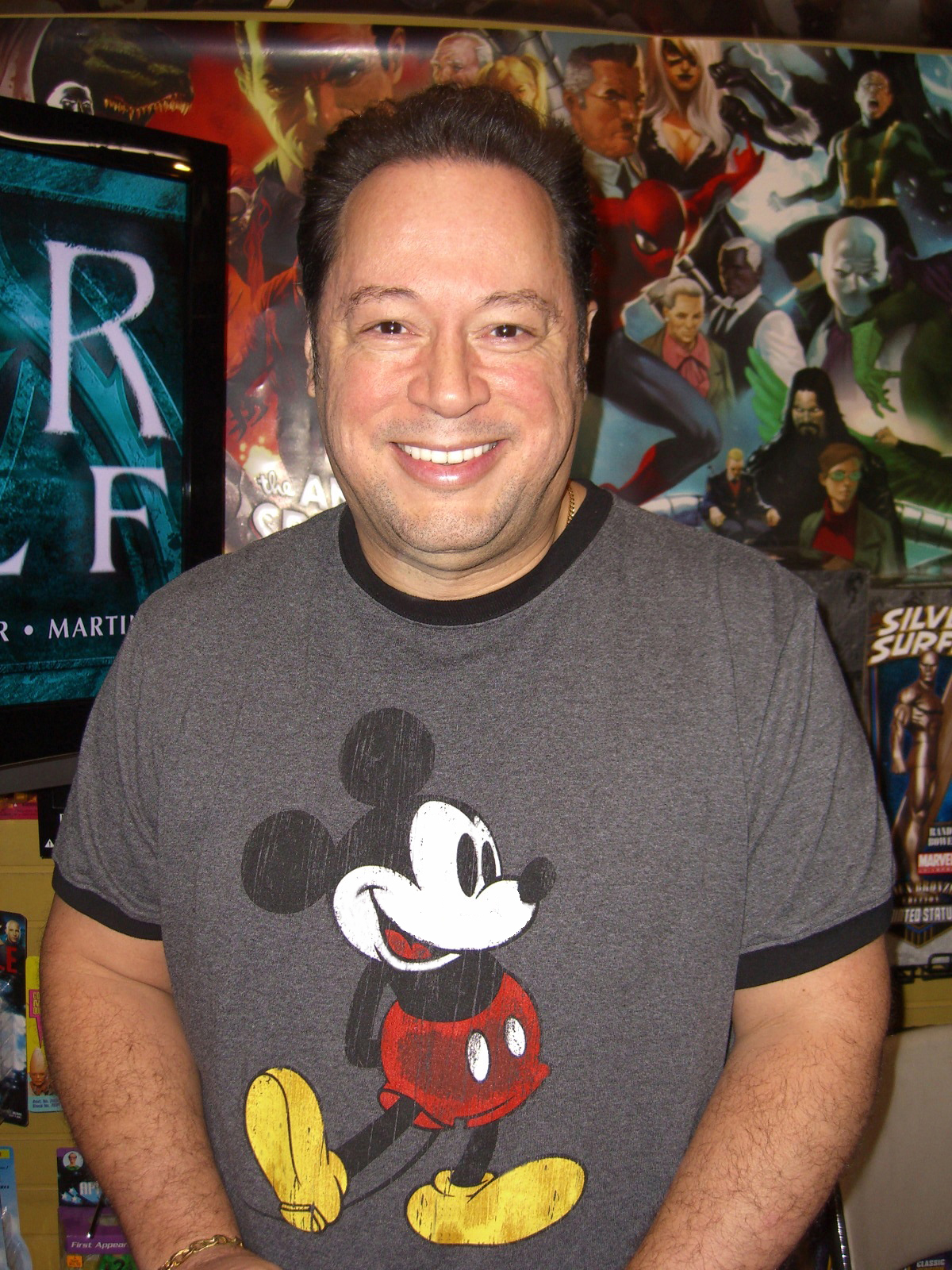
Quesada at the December 21, 2010 press conference for the "Fear Itself" storyline at Midtown Comics Times Square in Manhattan

Two and a half years after starting Marvel Knights, Joe Quesada became editor-in-chief of Marvel Comics in 2000, following Bob Harras's departure from the company. At the same time, Bill Jemas succeeded to the presidency of the company. The relationship culminated in the establishment of the Ultimate line of Marvel titles, which were aimed at new readers and took place outside of the restrictive continuity of the Marvel Universe.

In the mid-2000s, Quesada imposed a moratorium on the practice of creatively bringing back characters thought to be dead, known as "dead is dead." In a January 2008 interview in which he was questioned about numerous characters that had since been resurrected, Quesada clarified that the policy was for writers to exercise forethought and caution before killing off characters or resurrecting them, so that such plots were not produced too frequently or without gravitas, and not that it be entirely prohibited.

Joe Quesada's predecessor as Marvel editor-in-chief, Bob Harras, canceled and restarted all of Marvel's titles that were not either X-Men-related or at fewer than 100 issues already. This was an effort to shore up sagging sales with a new #1 issue for each of Marvel's popular titles, issued at a time shortly after the 1990s bust of the comic book collecting market, and when Marvel was in the throes of bankruptcy. Quesada reversed this policy first by showing the "old", combined issue numbers beside the "new" numbers on covers (the difference between the two issue numbers shown on the cover would always be the number of issues that the series had before Harras restarted it), and then definitively restoring the "old" numbers for Fantastic Four, Amazing Spider-Man and Avengers when they each passed the 500 mark.

Quesada was involved in the creation of three successful Marvel imprints:

- Marvel Knights, aimed at telling standalone tales, with Jimmy Palmiotti (before his tenure as editor-in-chief)
- MAX, aimed at adult-only readers, with Brian Michael Bendis
- Ultimate, aimed at new readers, with Brian Michael Bendis and Mark Millar

Critics of Quesada's policy of emphasizing trade paperbacks charge that they cannibalize monthly comic book sales, because readers may opt to forgo monthly series in order to wait for the cheaper collections, not realizing that monthly sales are an indicator to publishers of interest in such collections.

One of his most controversial decisions was the decision that the long-time marriage of Mary Jane Watson and Peter Parker had to be dissolved. In order to do this, he began writing the storyline later known as "One More Day" with J. Michael Straczynski (who requested to have his name removed from the story). When confronted with overwhelming backlash as a result of the retcon, Quesada participated in a series of interviews on the subject to address the issue of the marriage, comparing it to real life marriages. He also promoted and praised the MC2 title Spider-Girl for continuing to provide fans with a stable marriage and an expanded family, although that title was later canceled and relaunched multiple times, eventually being cancelled for good in 2010.

In June 2009 Quesada began writing a weekly column for Comic Book Resources called "Cup O' Joe", in which he answers questions every Friday from readers or provides information on Marvel projects.

On February 10, 2010, Quesada issued a public apology for the content of Captain America #602, which had drawn condemnation from national Tea Party leaders, for its depiction of an apparent Tea Party protest, and the black superhero Falcon, reacting to it by saying that he would not be welcomed by a crowd of "angry white folks". Also at issue was the slogans on some of the signs held by the protestors. Quesada stated that future reprints of that story would have the offending material omitted.

==== Chief Creative Officer and continued art ====
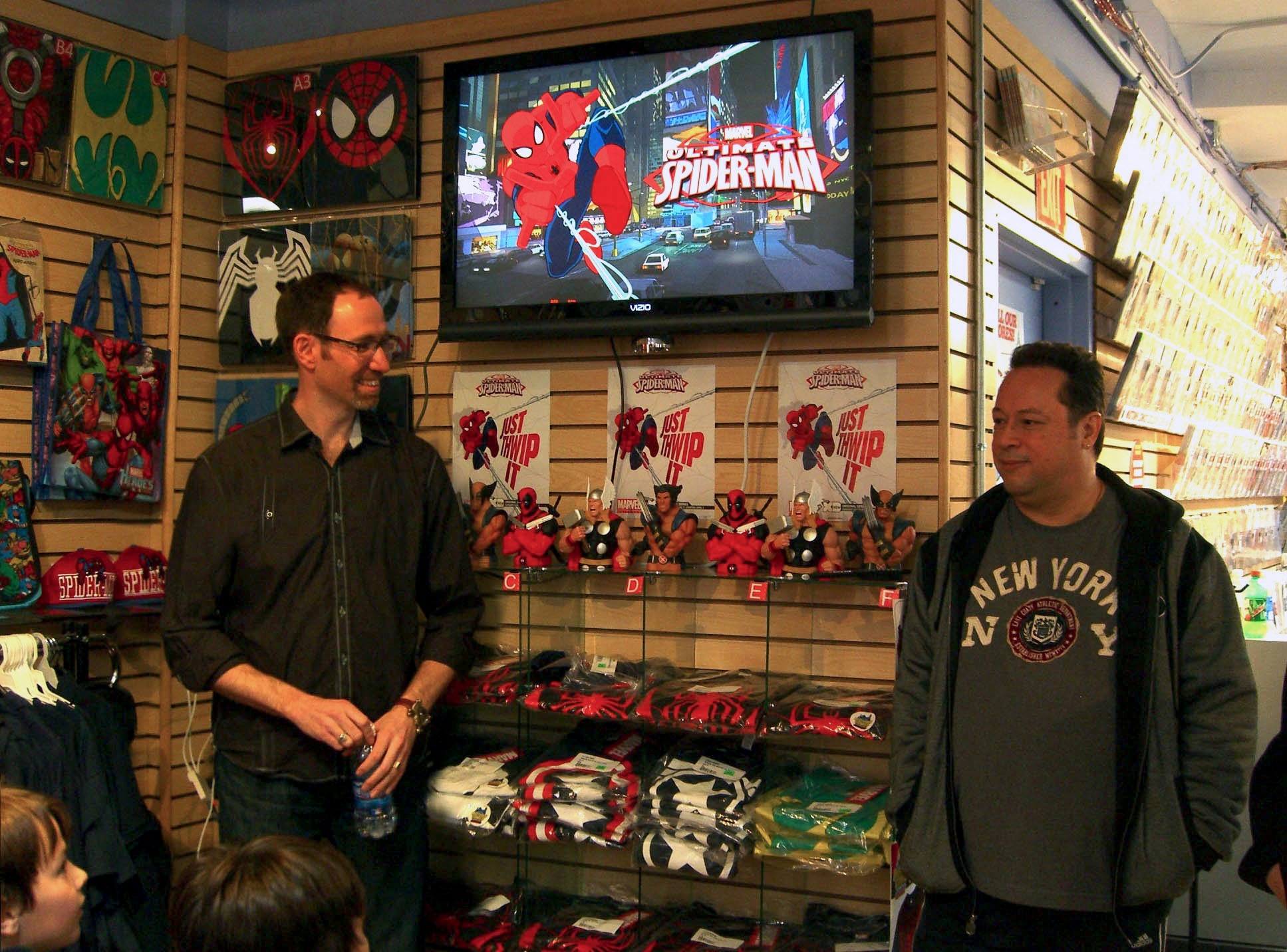
Quesada with writer/producer Joe Kelly prepare a March 31, 2012, sneak preview of Ultimate Spider-Man for fans at Midtown Comics in Manhattan, the day before the series' broadcast TV debut.

On June 2, 2010, Marvel announced that it promoted Joe Quesada to chief creative officer of Marvel Entertainment. In this position Quesada will help ensure that all portrayals of Marvel's characters and stories remain true to the essence of Marvel history. He will also oversee the creative aspects of media adaptations of Marvel properties, which include participating in story and script development.

On January 4, 2011, Quesada stepped down as editor-in-chief, and was replaced by Axel Alonso. After being given the additional job of CCO, in 2010, Quesada explained to Comic Book Resources, "With my increased travel schedule over the last year plus, I've only been able to work with the publishing division in a more macro sense, or as you put it, a more, "big picture," sense. During this time, Tom and Axel have been handling the more detailed functions of the stories within our comics. My role has been one in which I work on the larger stories and the overall flavor and feel of our books and universe."

Quesada later elaborated on this decision in a 2011 interview with Visual Arts Journal, a publication of his alma mater, the School of Visual Arts, by saying that he always viewed the editor in chief position as a finite one that he would leave after he accomplished what he had set out to, and that the then-recent purchase of Marvel by Disney opened up opportunities he wanted to explore. Quesada contrasted his former editor in chief role as one in which he was solely focused on rebuilding Marvel's editorial division and overseeing its comics content, with his Chief Creative Officer role as one in which he would be involved creatively with several divisions.

With the October 2019 Marvel reorganization that named Kevin Feige as Chief Creative Officer across Marvel Entertainment and Marvel Studios, he would continue to work for Marvel Entertainment with his position re-titled as executive vice president and creative director for Marvel Entertainment. On May 31, 2022, Quesada announced he would part ways with Marvel.

=== Post-Marvel career ===
After leaving Marvel, Quesada was recruited to Amazon Studios in a first-look deal to develop film and television productions from comic book properties.

In July 2024, he was announced as the head of a new comic book company called Amazing Comics. A joint venture between Mad Cave Studios and Belgian publisher Dupuis, their first series will be Disciple, a reimagining of Shakespeare's Hamlet, with Quesada co-writing and drawing.

== Techniques and materials ==
When illustrating, Quesada begins with the story of sketches much smaller than the actual size at which he will render the final drawing. He employs a Cintiq drawing tablet when he desires to do a "tighter" digital layout of an illustration. When sketching figures, he will sometimes use photographic reference, and incorporate the photos directly into his sketches during the process of finalizing a layout. Once he makes a final decision on a layout, he will then print it out at full size, and use a light box to pencil it, sometimes altering elements in the design such as lighting or other details.

== Media appearances ==
In Kevin Smith's 1995 film Mallrats Quesada is credited as an artist for the opening sequence featuring fictional comic books covers. He also appears in the closing scene of Smith's Chasing Amy, alongside frequent collaborator and inker Jimmy Palmiotti, signing comic books at a convention. He later appeared as a pizza delivery man in Smith's 2001 film Jay and Silent Bob Strike Back.

Quesada was one of a number of comics creators that appeared in Once Upon A Time The Super Heroes, a 2002 documentary about the creation and evolution of comic book superheroes.

Quesada voices Joe, the owner of the "Q's Cup O' Joe" coffee shop, in the 2017 Spider-Man animated series. The character is modeled after Quesada.

== Awards ==
- 1993: Diamond Gem Award for Best Cover, for X-O Manowar #0

== Personal life ==
Quesada lives with his wife, Nanci and their daughter, Carlie, in a loft in the Flatiron District.

Quesada is a fan of the New York Mets.

== Bibliography ==
=== DC Comics ===
- Azrael, Vol. 2, #1–9 (2009–2010)
- Azrael/Ash (1997)
- Batman: Sword of Azrael, miniseries, #1–4 (1992–1993)
- Question Quarterly #3, 5 (1991–1992)
- The Ray, miniseries, #1–6 (1992)
- Spelljammer #8–13, 15 (1991)

==== Covers ====
- Batman #500 (1993)

=== Marvel Comics ===
- The Amazing Spider-Man #544–545, 601 (full art); #639–641 (along with Paolo Rivera, also writer) (2007–2010)
- Daredevil, Vol. 2, #1–11, 13–14 (full art); #50 (among other artists) (1998–2003); #12 (writer) (2000)
- Daredevil: Father, miniseries, (also as writer) #1–6 (2004–2007)
- Deathlok, Vol. 4, #1 (2013)
- Friendly Neighborhood Spider-Man #24 (2007)
- Iron Man, Vol. 3, #26–35, Annual 2000 (writer) (2000)
- Marvel Knights Double Shot (Punisher) #1 (2002)
- Midnight Sons Unlimited #1 (1993)
- Marvel Legacy #1, (with Jason Aaron and various artists, Marvel, 2017)
- Miracleman #1–2 (cover only, 2014)
- NYX, miniseries, #1–7 (writer) (2003–2005)
- The Sensational Spider-Man, Vol. 2 #41 (2007)
- Sleepwalker #12 (1992)
- What The--?! #13 (1991)
- X-Factor #87-92; Annual #7 (1992–1993)
- X-51 #87–92; Annual Vol. 1, #1 (1999)

==== Covers ====
- 2099 A.D., Vol. 1, #1, #3 (variant cover only, 1995)
- Adventures of the Thing, Vol. 1 #3 (1992)
- A Moment of Silence, Vol. 1, #1 (2002)
- Age of Ultron, Vol. 1, #10 (variant cover only, 2013)
- The Amazing Spider-Man, Vol. 1, #592–594 (2009) #545, 601, 638–641, 656, 700 (variant cover only, 2008–2012)
- The Amazing Spider-Man: Renew Your Vows, Vol. 1, #5 (variant cover only, 2015)
- Avenging Spider-Man, Vol. 1, #1 (variant cover only, 2011)
- Avengers Assemble, Vol. 2, #9 (2012)
- Avengers vs. X-MenInfinite #1 (2012)
- Avengers vs. X-Sanction, Vol. 1, #1 (2012)
- Angela Asgard's Assassin, Vol. 1, #1 (2014)
- Cage, Vol. 1, #1 (2016)
- Black Panther #1 (1998–2003)
- Cable and X-Force, Vol. 1, #1 (variant cover only, 2012)
- Captain America, Vol. 7, #1 (variant cover only, 2012)
- Life of Captain Marvel, Vol. 2, #1 #3 (variant cover only, 2018)
- Daredevil, Vol. 5, #1,#600 (variant cover only, 2015)
- Darth Vader, Vol. 1, #25 (variant cover only, 2015)
- Deathlok, Vol. 3, #1 (variant cover only, 1999)
- Doctor Strange #1–2 (variant cover only, 2013)
- Fantastic Four, Vol. 1, #600/Vol. 4 #1 (variant cover only, 2011)
- Siege #1–4 (variant cover only, 2010)
- Spider-Man: Get Kraven #1–5 (Marvel, 2002–2003)
- The New Avengers #1 (variant cover only, 2005)
- The Superior Spider-Man, Vol. 1, #1 (Marvel, 2013–2014)
- Venom #1, (2011–2013)
- Wolverine #29; #33 (2006)
- Wolverine: Origins #1–8, #13–15 (Marvel, 2003–2009)
- X-Factor, Vol. 1, #92 (Marvel, 2005)

=== Other publishers ===
- Ash #1, 1/2 (also writer) (Event, 1994–1997)
- Ash: The Fire Within, miniseries, #2 (also writer) (Event, 1997)
- Deathmate: Epilogue (Image, 1994)
- Commando #4944 (DC Thomson) (full art)
- Ninjak #1–3 (Valiant, 1994)
- Painkiller Jane #1 (writer) (Dynamite, 2006)
- Painkiller Jane Zero #0 (writer) (Event, 1999)
- X-O Manowar #0 (Valiant, 1993)

Preceded by Bob Harras	Marvel Comics Editor-in-Chief; 2000–2011	Succeeded by Axel Alonso
Preceded by Kurt Busiek & Roger Stern	Iron Man writer 2000 (with Frank Tieri in late 2000)	Succeeded by Frank Tieri
Preceded by Ron Garney	The Amazing Spider-Man artist 2007	Succeeded by Steve McNiven
