= The Pro (comics) =

Comic book by Garth Ennis

- Cover of The Pro TPB.

Publication information
- Publisher: Image Comics
- Format: One-shot
- Genre: Superhero, satire
- Publication date: July 2002
- No. of issues: 1
- Main character: The Pro

Creative team
- Created by: Garth Ennis; Jimmy Palmiotti
- Written by: Garth Ennis
- Penciller: Amanda Conner
- Inker: Jimmy Palmiotti
- Colorist: Paul Mounts

Collected editions
- Pro Oversized: ISBN 1-58240-383-X

The Pro is a prestige format one-shot comic book written by Garth Ennis, with pencils and lettering by Amanda Conner and inks by Jimmy Palmiotti. It was originally published by Image Comics in 2002.

== Plot ==
A parody of mainstream superhero comics, the story details the brief career of an unnamed prostitute given superhuman powers by an alien called the Viewer. The Pro reluctantly joins the League of Honor which is a parody of the Justice League, composed of the Saint, the Knight & the Squire, the Lady, the Lime, and Speedo who are a parody of Superman, Batman & Robin, Wonder Woman, Green Lantern and the Flash, respectively.

Together, the League fight an array of lackluster villains, such as The Noun and The Adverb, until the Pro's coarse language and actions, violence, bloody retributions, and her fellating The Saint result in her being expelled from the League. The Pro rejoins them to fight a terrorist attack, flying into space holding a nuclear bomb, and facing death (more in an effort to save the life of her young child than anyone else in the vicinity).

Later editions feature an additional eight-page story entitled "The Pro Vs. The Ho" in which the Pro squares off with a 12-armed prostitute. In the story, the Ho receives powers in much the same way that the Pro does via the alien "Viewer" that orbits the Earth in a cloaked ship. Because the Pro has superpowers, she is able to perform sex acts using superspeed. The problem arises when several of the Johns complain that by the time they relax enough to enjoy themselves, their "job" is over. The Ho then appears and confronts the Pro, who knocks her into the river and eventually saves her from drowning. Subsequently, the two women get to know one another. The Ho explains that she never wanted superhuman powers, and all she ever wanted to do was work with small animals as a veterinarian. The Pro resolves to take the Ho to animal husbandry facility where she uses all 12 of her arms to "service" the animals for breeding.

== Sequel ==
A sequel story, titled "The Pro: Back in Business," written by Jimmy Palmiotti and Amanda Conner, with art by Amanda Conner and coloring by Paul Mounts, was released in the sixth issue of Image! 30th Anniversary Anthology.

The short story takes place 20 years after the original series and opens with cosmonauts discovering the Pro floating in space, unconscious, but alive. The President informs the Saint of her return, causing him to panic and tell the Lady that he broke his promise to the Pro in that he turned her son into one of them. It ends with a "To Be Continued" message, but as of January 2023, the form any continuation will take has not yet been announced.

== In other media ==
On June 15, 2010, 5finity Productions released a limited edition sketch card series, including original art by Amanda Conner, Jimmy Palmotti and notable sketch card artists.

In July 2010, an animated short based on the comic was released on YouTube.

=== Film adaptation ===
On October 12, 2009, Conner and Palmotti proposed a live-action adaptation of the graphic novel. They have said that they would like to have either Sarah Silverman or Ellen Muth as the lead. In March 2017, Paramount Pictures picked up the film rights to The Pro and hired Zoe McCarthy to write the screenplay.

== Collected editions ==
Three volumes collect both of The Pro's adventures:

- Pro Oversized (72 pages, deluxe, oversized and hardcover, November, 2004, ISBN 1-58240-383-X)
- Pro (80 pages, paperback, September 2007, ISBN 1-58240-850-5)
- Pro (72 pages, paperback reprint of Pro Oversized, June 2010, ISBN 978-1-58240-850-7)

The 80-page new edition sold out and has had to be reprinted, thus Image's decision to reprint the Oversized version in paperback.

== Reception ==
Craig Lemon of Comics Bulletin responded positively to The Pro, calling it "a hilarious piss-take" while commending the "morality play" twist ending. Similarly, Geek in the city's Aaron Duran, who placed The Pro at #4 on a list of the best graphic novels of the 2000s, labelled the book "One of the most vile, disgusting, perverse, and gut-numbingly hilarious comics of all time". The Pro ranked at #14 in the Comic Book Resources list The Greatest Garth Ennis Stories Ever Told!, where it was described as "off-kilter" and "hilarious".

Upon receiving a press release for the book, writer and artist Jim Steranko lambasted it as "psychotic, nihilistic garbage" produced by evil cultural terrorists, which prompted its creative team into inserting the sarcastic dedication "For Steranko".
