= Trial of Magneto =

X-Men limited series

- The standard cover art for X-Men: The Trial of Magneto #1. Art by Valerio Schiti.

Publication information
- Publisher: Marvel Comics
- Format: Limited series
- Genre: Superhero
- Publication date: August – December 2021
- No. of issues: 5
- Main character(s): Magneto; Scarlet Witch; X-Factor

Creative team
- Written by: Leah Williams
- Artist: Lucas Werneck
- Colorist: Edgar Delgado
- Editors: Jordan D. White (senior editor); Jake Tomar (editor); Jonathan Hickman (Head of X)

Collected editions
- X-Men: The Trial of Magneto: ISBN 978-1302932176

"X-Men: The Trial of Magneto" is a comic book storyline, which debuted in August 2021, published by Marvel Comics. The limited series spins out of the murder of Scarlet Witch during the "Hellfire Gala".

== Publication history ==
"Trial of Magneto" was originally the title of a story arc in Uncanny X-Men #200 (1985), by writer Chris Claremont and artist John Romita Jr., where Magneto was put on trial before the International Court of Justice.

In May 2021, Marvel announced – with a teaser drawn by Romita Jr. – a limited series titled X-Men: The Trial of Magneto by writer Leah Williams and artist Lucas Werneck. The limited series is part of the X-Men line Reign of X; it follows the events of the Hellfire Gala where the Scarlet Witch is murdered in X-Factor (vol. 4) #10. Williams commented that the intended focus of the series is on Scarlet Witch and rehabilitating "Wanda's image with the rest of the mutants on Krakoa"; Williams stated that "her goal is not to write the next defining Magneto story but to write an 'empathy engine', as a Wanda sympathiser, to authentically tell a story that's going to be about healing and catharsis".

Williams informed Bleeding Cool that the X-Factor series was canceled when her Magneto/Wanda story arc pitch for X-Factor "became such a popular pitch at Marvel", however, Marvel didn't believe that X-Factor's readership numbers were "big enough for this story" which led to the development of the Trial of Magneto limited series. The title of the limited series was a marketing decision. Marvel "canceled X-Factor #10 rather than seeing it run as originally planned, with the Trial beginning in X-Factor #15. Williams says she only learned about the cancellation of X-Factor when she was writing #9, so as she had to finish the series quickly, squeezing six issues worth of story into those last two issues, calling it 'cramped and rushed'".

In terms of Marvel comics continuity, The Trial of Magneto takes place after the Darkhold event storyline and mostly before the Inferno (2021) event storyline. These storylines were published concurrently; Darkhold was published in 2021 due to delays in comic book distribution in 2020. In September 2022, Marvel announced a Scarlet Witch solo series which follows the events of The Trial of Magneto; it premiered in January 2023.

== Plot ==
The ruling council of Krakoa meet to discuss the murder of the Scarlet Witch and whether they should resurrect her due to her status as a human and the cause of M-Day. Due to evidence Wanda's attacker possessed magnetic abilities, Magneto is deemed a prime suspect. Following the attack, the Avengers are invited to take Wanda's body from Krakoa and a complicated confrontation ensues. Wanda resurrects herself to the shock of the Five, who were preparing to resurrect Wanda themselves. The Five are a group of five mutants who are responsible for Krakoa's "resurrection protocols," used to restore mutants by recreating their bodies and then implanting a "back-up" copy of their mind previously recorded to the super-computer Cerebro. However as Wanda resurrected herself in a younger body, her mind's last back-up to Cerebro was recorded before the events of Avengers Disassembled. As a result, the resurrected Wanda has no memories of recent years. As others attempt to restore Wanda's mind, she is overwhelmed by the guilt of suddenly remembering the last few years and her actions, causing her to create physical constructs of monsters. Meanwhile, on the astral plane, the spirit of the murderer Wanda finds herself facing is a vision of an older self who confronts her with uncomfortable truths she has denied. Realizing the need to heal by accepting her actions and forgiving herself, the three Wandas stop the monster attack and then merge together, resulting in a fully restored Wanda who now knows there is at least one possible future where she will grow old and wise.

Unwilling to explain their resurrection program to outsiders, the Council of Krakoa remain coy about specifics. Evidence is found against the mutant Toad, who is found guilty of murdering Wanda and punished, and the Avengers leave.

In the aftermath of the events, Wanda works with the mutants Polaris, Legion, and Proteus to increase the capabilities of the resurrection protocols but that doing so required her physical death. She recruits Magneto's help in arranging her own death, a suicide disguised by magic to look like a murder. Thanks to Wanda's plan, Wanda is able to create a pocket dimension called the "Waiting Room" which now allows all mutants to be resurrected, including those who never had a chance to manifest their X-gene and those whose minds were not able to be copied to Cerebro. This added twenty million mutants to the queue, including everyone who died on Genosha. Learning this, the mutants of Krakoa who once referred to Wanda as a "Pretender" have forgiven her for the M-Day incident, with Exodus giving her the new title of "The Redeemer". Wanda is now a welcome guest of Krakoa, telling her story to children so they may learn from her mistakes.

== Reception ==
=== Sales ===
In terms of sales, Trial of Magneto #1 was #2 on Diamond's (Note: This monthly sales chart no longer includes sales of DC titles, since DC Comics left Diamond Comic Distributors in July 2020.) Top 200 Comics "Based on Total Unit Sales of Products Invoiced" list in August 2021 and Trial of Magneto #2 was #26 in September 2021. Per the ComicHub system, (Note: Per ICv2, "as this is a small, non-random sample of over 3,000 stores selling American comics worldwide, these rankings may not be typical for all stores, but do represent a variety of locations and store emphases".) Trial of Magneto #3 was #10 in "Top 50 Comic Books by Units" and #19 in "Top 200 Comic Books by Dollars" in October 2021; Trial of Magneto #4 was #11 in "Top 50 Comic Books by Units" and #22 in "Top 200 Comic Books by Dollars" in December 2021; Trial of Magneto #5 was #27 in "Top 50 Comic Books by Units" and #42 in "Top 200 Comic Books by Dollars" in December 2021.

On Diamond's Top 2000 Comics for 2021 list, (Note: Per ICv2, "for this period, Diamond did not distribute DC Comics, so these ranks do not include titles from that publisher; Marvel Comics moved its primary distribution to Penguin Random House Publisher Services in August, so Diamond accounted for only a portion of Marvel sales to comic stores for the remainder of 2021".) Trial of Magneto #1 was #36 with 119,657 units sold, Trial of Magneto #2 was #164 with 60,017 units sold, Trial of Magneto #3 was #760 with 21,372 units sold, Trial of Magneto #4 was #953 with 16,106 units sold, and Trial of Magneto #5 was #1018 with 14,832 units sold.

=== Critical reaction ===
According to Comic Book Roundup, the entire Trial of Magneto series received a score of 6.4/10 based on 61 reviews – Trial of Magneto #1 received a score of 8.0/10 based on 13 reviews, Trial of Magneto #2 received a score of 7.7/10 based on 15 reviews, Trial of Magneto #3 received a score of 6.0/10 based on 12 reviews, Trial of Magneto #4 received a score of 4.9/10 based on 11 reviews, and Trial of Magneto #5 received a score of 5.4/10 based on 10 reviews.

Charles Pulliam-Moore, reviewing Trial of Magneto #1 for Gizmodo, highlighted that the script "is more interested in reestablishing who the Scarlet Witch was to different people throughout Marvel's comics. [...] The quiet grief that Werneck and Delgaldo's illustrations evoke is beautifully contrasted by the visceral, kinetic action sequence between Magneto and the new flagship X-Men team taking place elsewhere in the issue. [...] Trial of Magneto raises far more questions than it answers, but there's a pointed tranquility to Wanda's presence throughout the floral sequence that culminates in her being quite certain that she's not exactly 'dead,' per se".

Jamie Lovett, reviewing Trial of Magneto #1 for ComicBook.com, commented that this series is "off to a clumsy start" and that "the creators seem to know that it's retrograde without doing much to elevate it". Lovett wrote, "Aside from a few pink-hued flashbacks to Wanda's final moments, Werneck draws flat panels of characters standing around doing nothing interesting during these scenes. [...] The series has potential as the ending hints at something far more significant than Magneto's tantrums happening, but this opening chapter can't seem to settle on a consistently compelling tone".

Tim Webber, reviewing Trial of Magneto #5 for CBR, wrote: "Before most of Marvel's X-Men titles relaunch next year, X-Men: The Trial of Magneto #5, brings several long-gestating X-Men plot points to an understated but satisfying end. [...] Although Magneto almost feels like an afterthought here, the comic ably covers a lot of ground well. [...] Most impressively, The Trial of Magneto sets the Scarlet Witch up with a sustainable new status quo after spending years in relative comic book limbo".

Hannibal Tabu, reviewing Trial of Magneto #5 for Bleeding Cool, commented that this issue "betrays every promise the story created from its title to its promise of justice. The innocent are condemned, the powerful are confused, and the story, such as it is, only exacerbates the lack of consequences introduced with the Krakoan regime". Tabu wrote, "This book is bad. [...] There wasn't much Lucas Werneck, Edgar Delgado, or Clayton Cowles could do to steer this speeding car away from the sequoia with this foundation. [...] This 'story' will be a minor footnote in this era of mutant history, a tedious attempt at a mystery that ended up as a horrible mistake".

Dan Spinelli, reviewing the series for AIPT Comics, commented that Trial of Magneto was initially a hyped series especially because "fan-favorite writer Leah Williams and rising star artist Lucas Werneck" were on the creative team, but "the reaction was much less effusive and, in some corners of the Internet, even hostile" after the series was published. Spinelli highlighted that Trial of Magneto was originally planned as an arc of Williams' X-Factor, however, X-Factor was cancelled and The Trial of Magneto became a standalone event comic which was published at the same time as the 2021 Inferno event storyline. Spinelli wrote that series' issues seem "mostly structural. If designing a Scarlet Witch redemption arc from scratch, there doesn't seem to be much of a reason to involve X-Factor, a team mostly disconnected from her [...]. But Trial of Magneto also serves as a de facto sequel to X-Factor, meaning Williams devotes ample page time to" X-Factor characters "somewhat tangential" to Magneto and Wanda's story. While Spinelli "found the series flawed at times", he wrote, "I did appreciate Williams' comfort with leaving the reader in an ambiguous position at the end of the series, thrilled to see Wanda's redemption but deeply uncomfortable with its cost".

== Collected editions ==
Title	Material collected	Publication date	Pages	ISBN	Ref
X-Men: The Trial Of Magneto	The Trial Of Magneto #1–5	March 9, 2022	152	ISBN 978-1-302-93217-6	
Trials of X Vol. 1	The Trial of Magneto #1–2, S.W.O.R.D. #7, New Mutants #20–21, Marauders #23	October 19, 2022	176	ISBN 9781302949532	
Trials of X Vol. 2	Cable: Reloaded #1, X-Men: The Trial of Magneto #3–5, Wolverine #14	November 15, 2022	152	ISBN 9781302949549	
