= Power Girl (comic book) =

Comic book series featuring Power Girl

- Cover of Power Girl #1 (June 1988). Art by Kerry Gammill and Dick Giordano.

Publication information
- Publisher: DC Comics
- Format: List: (vol. 1) Limited series (vol. 2-3) Ongoing series
- Genre: Superhero
- Publication date: List: (vol. 1) April – July 1988 (vol. 2) May 2009 – August 2011 (vol. 3) September 2023 – April 2025
- No. of issues: List: (vol. 1): 4 (vol. 2): 27 (vol. 3): 20 (plus two Special)
- Main character: Power Girl

Creative team
- Written by: List: (vol. 1) Paul Kupperberg (vol. 2): Jimmy Palmiotti (#1–12) Justin Gray (#1–12) Judd Winick (#13–25) Lilah Sturges (#26–27) (vol. 3): Leah Williams
- Artist: List: (vol. 1) Rick Hoberg Arne Starr (vol. 2): Amanda Conner (#1–12) Sami Basri (#13–23) Hendry Prasetya (#24–27) (vol. 3): Eduardo Pansica Travis Moore Adriana Melo
- Letterer: List: (vol. 1) Bob Pinaha (vol. 2): John J. Hill (#1–24) Travis Lanham (#25–27) (vol. 3): Becca Carey
- Colorist: List: (vol. 1) Julianna Ferriter (vol. 2) Paul Mounts (#1–13) Sunny Gho (#14–20) Jessica Kholinne (#16–27) (vol. 3) Sebastian Cheng Romulo Fajardo Jr

Collected editions
- Omnibus edition (2026): ISBN 9781799508724

Power Girl is an American superhero comic book series featuring the character of the same name, published by DC Comics, beginning with a four-issue limited series that debuted in June 1988. The series returned as an ongoing series in May 2009 and continued until October 2011. After a hiatus, it was relaunched in May 2023, beginning with a one-shot special as part of the Dawn of DC relaunch, with later issues tying in with DC All In.

The second volume was launched in 2009 after its announcement at the 2008 New York Comic Con. The early issues were written by Jimmy Palmiotti and Justin Gray, and illustrated by Amanda Conner. The series aimed to balance Power Girl's superhero and personal lives, distinguishing her from her Earth-One counterpart Supergirl with a lighter, action-focused narrative. Critics praised the early issues for their storytelling and artwork.

The third volume, launched in 2023 with a one-shot special introducing her new secret identity, Dr. Paige Stetler, and her new powers she had after the "Lazarus Planet" storyline and Dawn of DC relaunch. The series focuses on the title character's identity struggles, her relationship with the Superman family, and battling her own enemies. The debut issue in November 2023 was well-received, ranking as the 36th best-selling comic and praised for its engaging storytelling and art.

== Publication history ==
The second volume of the series was first announced at the New York Comic Con in 2008, although it took about a year for the comic to be released, with the first issue debuting in May 2009. The delay occurred because the series' artist, Amanda Conner, was still finishing up work on the Terra miniseries. Later on, DC announced that Judd Winick will take over as the writer and Sami Basri as the artist for the series, starting with issue #13, following the departure of the previous creative team.

In 2023, DC announced a third volume set to debut as part of the Dawn of DC relaunch in September 2023. The series written by Leah Williams and illustrated by Eduardo Pansica. Prior to the series launch, a special one-shot titled Power Girl Special #1, featuring Williams and artist Marguerite Sauvage was released on May 30, 2023 as an induction to the series.

== Content and themes ==
=== Volume 2 (2009—2011) ===
Jimmy Palmiotti explained that the series focused on balancing Kara Zor-L's superhero life with her personal life, particularly her secret identity as Karen Starr. Their goal was to distinguish Power Girl from her Earth-1 counterpart, Supergirl, by making her story lighter, action-packed, and fun, avoiding the darker tones often seen in other DC stories. The series is set in and around New York City, introducing a new supporting cast and "old villains" like Ultra-Humanite, and exploring Kara's personal challenges and independence. Palmiotti and Gray wanted to blend superhero action with character-driven moments, aiming to make Power Girl more relatable through her personality and relationships. Artist Amanda Conner's "expressive" work was noted for playing a role in the series' success. It was credited with adding depth through detailed facial expressions and body language, in a style noted to be similar to the works of Bruce Timm and Darwyn Cooke.

After the previous creative team left following issue 12, Judd Winick became the main writer. He noted that he wanted to build on their work while bringing a fresh perspective. His run tied Power Girl to Justice League: Generation Lost, as he noted that the title character had a history with the Justice League International that he wanted to explore. Winick also wanted to establish the character as "a force of her own rather than rely on her past connections with Superman or the Justice Society", while also aiming to maintain what the previous creative team had established. As he said: "It's about trying to tell a solo book with Power Girl - adventures and stories that make her unique. And I think that Jimmy, Justin and Amanda before me laid the groundwork and told terrific stories and really got her up and running." He also wanted to keep the character "self-sustained", and the series is filled with action and humor, but not goofy-type humor.

=== Volume 3 (2023—2025) ===
The third series kicked off with a one-shot special, introducing the title character's new powers and mission following the events of "Lazarus Planet" and DC Comics' Dawn of DC. In Power Girl Special #1, Power Girl faces Johnny Sorrow, a villain obsessed with her who holds Earth hostage. Following the special, the ongoing series began with Power Girl #1. The series follows Kara as she deals with her new powers, identity, and emotional challenges, especially her relationship with the Superman family, and faces new enemies. During this run, Kara adopted a new alter ego, Dr. Paige Stetler, a scientist focused on sustainable technology.

Writer Leah Williams explained that she chose the name "Paige" because it suits the character, while "Stetler" reflects her idea of a "cowboy-sounding name", as Power Girl is more of a "lone ranger" compared to the rest of the Superman Family. Williams also gave the character a job as a tech columnist for the fictional newspaper Daily Planet under Editor-in-Chief Lois Lane, who helps Paige meet her deadlines and acts as her connection to Superman. Starting from issue 14, the series is tied into the DC All In initiative.

== Critical reception ==
The second volume has a 7.7 rating on the comic book review aggregator website Comic Book Roundup. According to Doug Zawisza of CBR, the first issue provided Power Girl with "a clear purpose and potential for growth," marking it as a "fun, bombastic superhero title" with wide appeal. While Zawisza emphasized its strong lead character and meaningful challenges, IGN's Dan Phillips found the issue lacking in execution. He acknowledged the exciting premise—Power Girl battling an evil gorilla in Manhattan—but felt that the writing dampened the comic’s energetic potential, suggesting a more straightforward narrative could have improved the issue's pacing and tone.

The third volume has a 6.5 rating on Comic Book Roundup. According to ICv2, the debut issue, released in November, ranked as the 36th best-selling comic in September 2023. Charlie Ridgely from ComicBook.com noted that the first issue sets the stage with a balance of character development and action, making it enjoyable for new readers praises it as a "fun, fresh start," while GeekDad noting the intriguing dynamic between Paige and Omen, though he raises concerns about Superman's portrayal as more of a mentor than an equal. In the second issue, Ridgely continued to express enthusiasm, calling it an absolute blast with high stakes and fun storytelling. He appreciated that the narrative stands on its own, independent of Superman's adventures.

== Collected editions ==
Title	Material collected	Pages	Publication date	ISBN
Volume 2 (2009—2011)
A New Beginning	Power Girl (vol. 2) #1–6	160	April 14, 2010	ISBN 9781401226183
Aliens and Apes	Power Girl (vol. 2) #7–12	144	October 6, 2010	ISBN 9781401229108
Bomb Squad	Power Girl (vol. 2) #13–18	144	June 22, 2011	ISBN 9781401231620
Old Friends	Power Girl (vol. 2) #19–27	200	February 15, 2012	ISBN 978-1401233655
Power Trip	JSA Classified #1–4 and Power Girl (vol. 2) #1–12	392	February 12, 2014	ISBN 9781401243074
New Beginnings and Old Friends Omnibus	Power Girl (vol. 2) #1–20	800	August 2026	ISBN 9781799508724
Volume 3 (2023—2025)
Power Girl Returns	Lazarus Planet: Assault on Krypton #1, Action Comics #1051–1053, Power Girl Special #1, and Knight Terrors: Action Comics #1–2	88	October 3, 2023	ISBN 9781779524072
Electric Dreams	Power Girl (vol. 3) #1–7	144	August 2024	ISBN 978-1779528148
More Than a Crush	Power Girl (vol. 3) #8–13	136	February 2025	ISBN 978-1799500513
The Star	Power Girl (vol. 3) #14–20	160	June 2025	ISBN 978-1799501701
Other
Power Girl	JSA Classified #1–4, Showcase #97–99 and Secret Origins #11	176	June 7, 2006	ISBN 9781845762803

== See also ==
- Superman (comic book)
- Supergirl (comic book)
- Superboy (comic book)
- List of Superman comics
- List of DC Comics imprints
