= Age of X-Man =

2019 crossover of Marvel Comics

- Cover to Age of X-Man: The Marvelous X-Men #1
- Publisher: Marvel Comics
- Publication date: 2019
- Genre: Superhero
Title(s)
Uncanny X-Men #1-22
Age of X-Man Alpha
Age of X-Man: The Marvelous X-Men #1-5
Age of X-Man: NextGen #1-5
Age of X-Man: The Amazing Nightcrawler #1-5
Age of X-Man: The X-Tremists #1-5
Age of X-Man: Prisoner X #1-5
Age of X-Man: Apocalypse and the X-Tracts #1-5
Age of X-Man Omega

Creative team
- Writers: Zac Thompson; Lonnie Nadler

Age of X-Man is a 2019 Marvel Comics crossover storyline featuring the X-Men. The name and premise derive from the 1995 storyline Age of Apocalypse, but instead focus on a utopian alternate universe led by the X-Man, Nate Grey.

== Publication history ==
The X-Men comics got a franchise-wide relaunch in 2018. The ongoing titles X-Men Gold, X-Men Blue, and X-Men Red were closed, and Uncanny X-Men was relaunched instead. This comic started the arc "X-Men Disassembled", and the press release said that it was "an epic tale of mystery and tragic disappearance, with an adventure so earth-shattering, it could very well be the X-Men’s final mission". This comic was written by Ed Brisson, Kelly Thompson and Matthew Rosenberg, with art by Mahmud Asrar, R.B. Silva, Yıldıray Çınar, and Pere Pérez, all of whom had been working in X-Men comics. The arc ended with X-Man transporting most mutants into an alternate reality of his own creation; from that point on the Uncanny X-Men comic starred Cyclops, Wolverine, and a handful of mutants that remained.

The storyline continued in other comic books, set in the aforementioned alternate reality: Age of X-Man: The Marvelous X-Men by Lonnie Nadler, Zac Thompson, and Marco Failla, Age of X-Man: NextGen by Ed Brisson and Marcus To, Age of X-Man: The Amazing Nightcrawler by Seanan McGuire and Juan Frigeri, Age of X-Man: Prisoner X by Vita Ayala and German Peralta, and Age of X-Man: Apocalypse and the X-Tracts by Tim Seeley and Salva Espin. The story ended with the one-shot Age of X-Man Omega, that returned the mutants to their reality. The X-Men franchise had a new relaunch after it, Dawn of X, led by Jonathan Hickman.

== Controversies ==
The comic Uncanny X-Men #5 features X-Man destroying the Padmanabhaswamy Temple, as well as other iconic places of worship, for antireligion reasons. The character said "I cleansed the world of its fake houses of worship and false prophets." Rajan Zed, the president of Universal Society of Hinduism, rejected it as offensive, and said that "Hinduism was the oldest and third largest religion of the world with about 1.1 billion adherents and a rich philosophical thought and it should not be taken frivolously. Symbols of any faith, larger or smaller, should not be mishandled."

In Uncanny X-Men #17, Wolfsbane is beaten to death by a mob. Commentators from Women Write About Comics, and The Beat considered the scene a case of transmisogyny, that would trivialize the violence against trans people and other minorities. The writer Matthew Rosenberg apologized for it on his Twitter account. Wolfsbane would later be resurrected in the Dawn of X storyline.

== Titles ==
=== Prelude ===
| Title | Issues | Writer(s) | Artist(s) | Colorist(s) | Debut date | Conclusion date |
|---|---|---|---|---|---|---|
| Uncanny X-Men | #1-10 | Ed Brisson; Kelly Thompson; Matthew Rosenberg | Mahmud A. Asrar; R.B. Silva; Yıldıray Çınar; Pere Pérez | Rachelle Rosenberg | November 2018 | January 2019 |

=== Limited series ===
| Title | Issues | Writer(s) | Artist(s) | Colorist(s) | Debut date | Conclusion date |
|---|---|---|---|---|---|---|
| Age of X-Man: The Marvelous X-Men | #1-5 | Zac Thompson; Lonnie Nadler | Marco Failla | Matt Milla | February 2019 | June 2019 |
| Age of X-Man: NextGen | #1-5 | Ed Brisson | Marcus To | Jason Keith | February 2019 | June 2019 |
| Age of X-Man: The Amazing Nightcrawler | #1-5 | Seanan McGuire | Juan Frigeri | Dono Sánchez-Almara | February 2019 | June 2019 |
| Age of X-Man: The X-Tremists | #1-5 | Leah Williams | Georges Jeanty; Roberto Poggi | Jim Charalampidis | February 2019 | June 2019 |
| Age of X-Man: Prisoner X | #1-5 | Vita Ayala | German Peralta | Mike Spicer | March 2019 | July 2019 |
| Age of X-Man: Apocalypse and the X-Tracts | #1-5 | Tim Seeley | Salva Espin | Israel Silva | March 2019 | July 2019 |

=== Ongoing series ===
| Title | Issues | Writer(s) | Artist(s) | Colorist(s) | Debut date | Conclusion date |
|---|---|---|---|---|---|---|
| Uncanny X-Men | #11-22 | Matthew Rosenberg | Salvador Larroca; Carlos E. Gomez; Carlos Villa | Rachelle Rosenberg | February 2019 | July 2019 |

=== One-shots ===
| Title | Writer(s) | Artist(s) | Colorist(s) | Debut date |
|---|---|---|---|---|
| Age of X-Man: Alpha | Zac Thompson; Lonnie Nadler | Ramon Rosanas | Triona Farrell | March 2019 |
| Age of X-Man: Omega | Zac Thompson; Lonnie Nadler | Simone Buonfantino | Triona Farrell | September 2019 |

== Collected editions ==
| Title | Material collected | Published date | ISBN |
|---|---|---|---|
| Age of X-Man: The Marvelous X-Men | Age of X-Man: Alpha, Age of X-Man: The Marvelous X-Men #1-5, Age of X-Man: Omega | September 2019 | 978-1302915759 |
| Age of X-Man: NextGen | Age of X-Man: NextGen #1-5 | September 2019 | 978-1302915766 |
| Age Of X-Man: Apocalypse & The X-Tracts | Age of X-Man: Apocalypse & The X-Tracts #1-5 | September 2019 | 978-1302915803 |
| Age of X-Man: X-Tremists | Age of X-Man: X-Tremists #1-5 | September 2019 | 978-1302915780 |
| Age Of X-Man: The Amazing Nightcrawler | Age of X-Man: The Amazing Nightcrawler #1-5 | September 2019 | 978-1302915773 |
| Age Of X-Man: Prisoner X | Age of X-Man: Prisoner X #1-5 | September 2019 | 978-1302915797 |
| Uncanny X-Men Vol. 1: X-Men Disassembled | Uncanny X-Men (vol. 5) #1-10 | April 2019 | 978-1302915018 |
| Uncanny X-Men: Cyclops and Wolverine Vol. 1 | Uncanny X-Men (vol. 5) #11-16 | July 2019 | 978-1302915827 |
| Uncanny X-Men: Wolverine And Cyclops Vol. 2 | Uncanny X-Men (vol. 5) #17-22 | October 2019 | 978-1302915834 |
