= Extermination (comics) =

2018 Marvel Comics storyline

- Publisher: Marvel Comics
- Publication date: August – December 2018
- Genre: Superhero
Title(s)
- X-Men Gold #27
- X-Men Blue #27
- X-Men Red #27
- Astonishing X-Men #13
- Cable #159
- Extermination #1-5
- X-Men: The Exterminated #1
- Uncanny X-Men Annual #1
- X-Force #1

Creative team
- Writer: Ed Brisson
- Artist(s): Pepe Larraz (main artist); Mark Brooks (cover artist)
- Penciller: Ario Anindito
- Inker: Dexter Vines
- Letterer: Joe Sabino
- Colorist: Erick Arciniega

"Extermination" is a five-part comic book crossover storyline published by Marvel Comics from August to December 2018 featuring the X-Men.

== Publication history ==
The storyline concludes a storyline that began in November 2012 during Brian Michael Bendis' run as writer on All-New X-Men, a series that debuted as part of the Marvel NOW! initiative. In All-New X-Men, Beast travels back in time to bring the original 1960's X-Men (Cyclops, Angel, Iceman, Beast, and Marvel Girl) to the present day so that they would be able to prevent the mistakes caused by their future counterparts. The time-displaced X-Men end up staying in the present, forming their own X-team alongside Wolverine, Oya, and Kid Apocalypse. Following the conclusion of All-New X-Men, the story of the time-displaced original five continued in X-Men Blue, which saw them working under the tutelage of Magneto with Jimmy Hudson and Bloodstorm, developing new relationships in the modern day, most notably Angel's relationship with Wolverine, Iceman being outed as gay, Beast experimenting with dark magic, Cyclops reuniting with his father and trying to come to terms with the actions of his future self and Jean Grey coming to terms with her own deaths and subsequent resurrections.

"Extermination" was officially announced in April 2018 by Marvel editor-in-chief C. B. Cebulski as part of Marvel's Fresh Start initiative, with further details being revealed at the C2E2 convention in Chicago. In the lead-up to the storyline, all current X-books were cancelled and had special post-credit scenes added to them by Extermination writer Ed Brisson and artist Oscar Bazaldua.

== Plot ==
In Chicago, the young X-Men rescue a pair of mutant children from a mob of violent anti-mutant protestors and take them to the X-Mansion where they are checked over by Cecilia Reyes. Marvel Girl tells Kitty Pryde that the children's minds had been wiped by someone so skilled that even she was unable to use her telepathy to piece together what happened to them. During a date with Bloodstorm, young Cyclops expresses his fears of the two becoming serious if he is destined to have to go back to his own time but Bloodstorm encourages him to focus on the time they do have together. Suddenly, the restaurant is attacked by a mysterious mutant and his minions and, although they try to fight them off, Bloodstorm is killed when the mutant impales her through the heart with his spear which causes Cyclops to unleash an optic blast so powerful that it forces the attacker to flee. Hearing Cyclops' grief, Marvel Girl summons the rest of the team but, while en route, young Iceman is attacked. Cable arrives and tells Iceman he needs to get away but he refuses and insists he stay and fight alongside him. The attacker incapacitates Iceman and kills Cable. The time-displaced X-Men rendezvous at the mansion where Cyclops explains to Prestige that the minions of the man that killed Bloodstorm had the same markings on their face as she does. Prestige realises that the attacker is Ahab, the man who tortured her and forced her to hunt down other mutants. Beast then notes that Iceman is missing and Marvel Girl uses Cerebro to try and locate him but she explains that his mind has seemingly disappeared. She then feels the psychic ructions of Cable's death and the team find his body but no sign of Iceman. Prestige is convinced that Ahab is not behind Cable's murder and theorises that he is working with someone else. In a secret underground lab, the attacker reveals himself to be a younger version of Cable who locks Iceman inside a tube and resolves to find the other four original X-Men.

Kitty holds a meeting with all of the X-Men and proposes that they split into four teams, each tasked with protecting one of the younger time-displaced X-Men so that Ahab and his accomplice are unable to find them. Cyclops storms out of the meeting and is followed by his teammates. He is frustrated that the present day X-Men want to babysit them and keep them out of the fight against Ahab. An argument ensues but it is interrupted by sniper fire which incapacitates Angel and Beast. Cyclops chases down the shooter and discovers that it is a younger version of Cable, who is able to teleport away with Angel before the other X-Men arrive. Beast takes his younger self to his lab to tend to his wounds and, while younger Beast believes Cable is brazen by attacking them at the mansion, the older Beast retorts that it is an attack born out of desperation. Ahab invades the mansion and an enraged Prestige charges at him but he easily bests her and uses the two mutant children to enable him to take control of Old Man Logan.

Young Cyclops is frustrated at having been taken to Atlantis by Nightcrawler, X-23 and the adult Jean Grey, but she refuses to allow him to take the fight to Ahab and promises to protect him in their underwater base. Marvel Girl reveals to Domino that she chose to go along with her, Warpath, Cannonball, Boom-Boom, and Shatterstar because she scanned their minds and determined that they were planning to go after the young Cable. Back at the mansion, Beast, Storm, Hellion, Armor, Rockslide, Kitty, and the adult Angel and Iceman hold off Ahab and Logan while the time-displaced Beast escapes but he is confronted with young Cable, who captures him. Ahab uses the children again to take control of Nightcrawler and Shatterstar but Jean and Cannonball manage to save the young Cyclops and Marvel Girl from their attacks. Domino tells Marvel Girl that she and her team intend to kill young Cable and she uses her telepathy to guide them to his location.

Cannonball brings Shatterstar back to the mansion, where Cecilia Reyes tries to free him of Ahab's mind control while the rest of the X-Men plan to attack his base to free Logan, Prestige, and Nightcrawler. Marvel Girl confronts young Cable who explains that he killed his older self because he had failed his mission to keep the timeline safe by allowing the young X-Men to stay in the present day. He then reveals that Ahab is trying to kill them so that they will never be able to go back to their original time, therefore drastically changing the future to one where mutants have all been wiped out. Boom Boom states that the young Cable is a monster by experimenting on Iceman and Angel but Cable explains that they must be the same as they were when they originally left their time and that he has cut off Angel's fire wings and replaced them with those of Mimic so that history will not be changed. Ahab attacks Atlantis and Jean's team desperately try to protect Cyclops while they wait for the rest of the X-Men to arrive and, although young Cable, who teleports in with the young Marvel Girl, Angel, Iceman and the others arrive to help, Ahab manages to kill young Cyclops with a spear.

It is revealed that Mimic had taken Cyclops' place and died instead of him. Jean orders young Cable to take the time-displaced X-Men away as they are being overrun by Ahab's forces but they refuse and resolve to fight, just at Kitty and her X-Men arrive to provide support. As Ahab uses the children to take over even more X-Men, Cable convinces the young X-Men that they need to return to their original timeline. Young Iceman breaks down to his older self, admitting he doesn't want to be forced back into the closet but the present day Bobby tells him that his younger self finally allowed him to accept that he was gay and promises that he will finally be able to truly be himself when he grows up. Cable teleports them five years into the past, where Marvel Girl tracks down the mutant children and learns how to undo their brain washing. Cable then sends the young X-Men back to their original time while he and Ahab return to the present day where Cable informs Jean that everything will go back to normal once the young X-Men close the time loop. In the past, the young X-Men change into their original clothes and Marvel Girl performs a mind wipe so that they won't remember their time in the present day although she informs them that she is able to lock their memories away so that, once the loop is closed, their older selves will regain those memories. Back in modern day, the founding X-Men inherit the memories of their younger selves, allowing Jean to defeat the young mutants and free everyone from their control with the exception of Prestige, who teleports away with Ahab, closely pursued by young Cable. The X-Men mourn the deaths of Bloodstorm, Cable and Mimic before Jean, Beast, Iceman and Angel meet alone in a diner and reminisce, proposing a toast to Cyclops (who died during the "Death of X" storyline) and to friends both past and present. In his lab, young Cable announces that he has completed his mission and tells his father, a resurrected Cyclops, that it is time for him to make his return.

== Titles involved ==
Prelude

- X-Men Gold #27
- X-Men Blue #27
- X-Men Red #5
- Astonishing X-Men #13
- Cable #159

Main Series

- Extermination #1-5

Aftermath

- X-Men: The Exterminated #1
- Uncanny X-Men Annual #1
- X-Force #1

== Reception ==
A review by Mike Fugere of CBR states that "Extermination" was "mostly" fulfilling for readers who had been following the story of the time-displaced X-Men for six years but felt it was "a bit rushed", using the analogy of a television network cancelling a show and leaving its showrunners to "swing for the fences and condense what would be a season's worth of content into a handful of episodes". He did, however, agree that "with so many X-Men coming back from the dead or being shuffled about, the mutant landscape has gotten pretty damn crowded in recent months" and therefore "getting rid of duplicate characters makes sense", summarising that "if this final arc was simply a way to sweep things aside to make room on the shelf, then writer Ed Brisson and artist Pepe Larraz handled things pretty well". Fugere praised the "wonderfully warm moments" that were able to take centre stage despite the speedy pace of Extermination, particularly highlighting the moment between the young and older versions of Iceman, stating that "Brisson handled their final encounter with grace". The art was also received positively, with Larraz's work on the Cable and Ahab fight scenes being described as "simply awesome". Fugere summarized by writing that "while this might not have been the big, cathartic ending some of us were hoping for, Extinction ties up a lot of loose ends while leaving one massive thread still dangling in the wind like busted kite string. It turns out the story of the time displaced original five X-Men might have come to a close, but the next chapter in comics' greatest superhero soap opera is just beginning."

== Collected editions ==
Title	Material collected	Pages	Publication date	ISBN
X-Men: Extermination	X-Men: Extermination #1-5	144	January 23, 2019	978-1846539657
