= Amanda Conner =

American comics artist and commercial art illustrator (since 1980s)

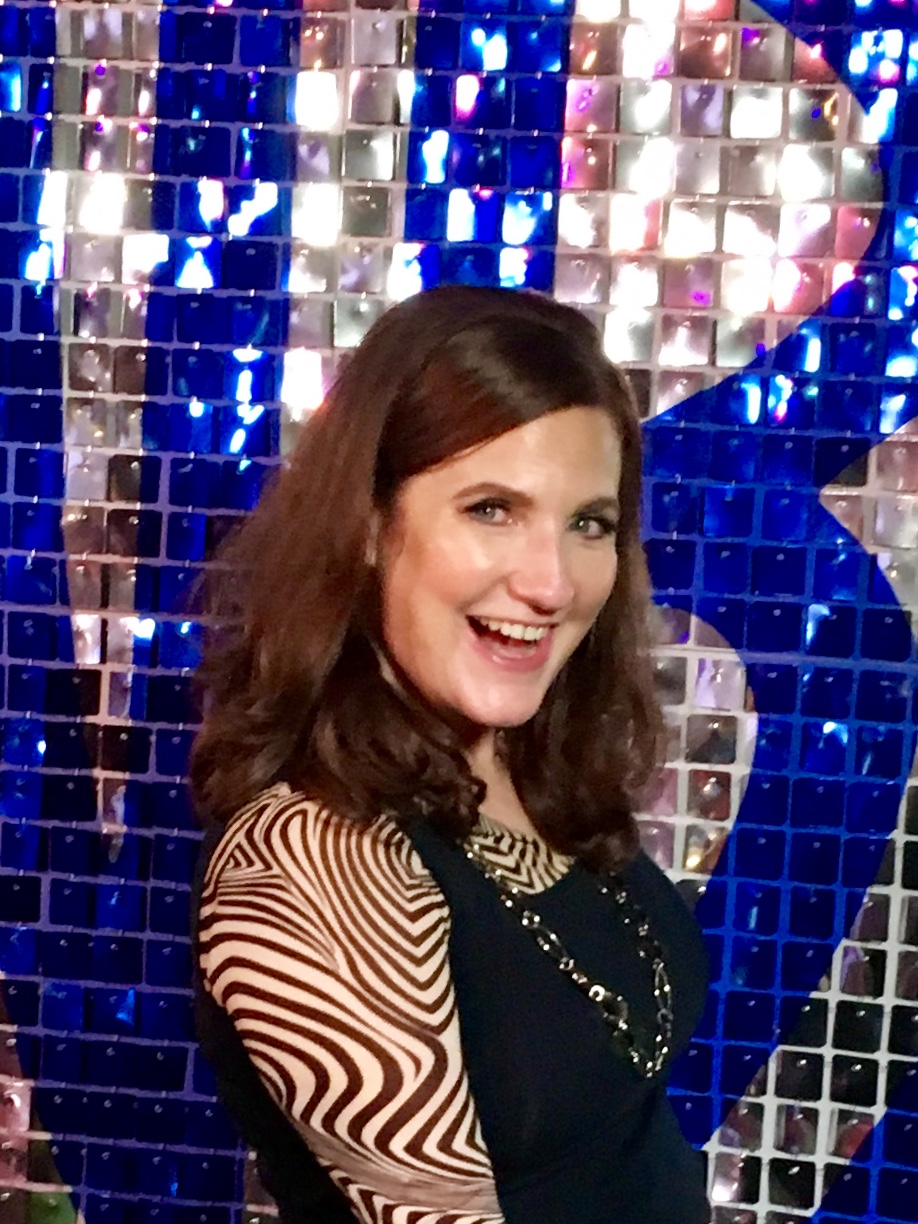
- Conner at the 2018 San Diego Comic-Con WB party
- Areas: Writer, Penciller, Inker
- Notable works: Harley Quinn; Power Girl; Gatecrasher
- Spouse: Jimmy Palmiotti

Amanda Conner is an American comics artist and commercial art illustrator. She began her career in the late 1980s for Archie Comics and Marvel Comics, before moving on to contribute work for Claypool Comics' Soulsearchers and Company and Harris Comics' Vampirella in the 1990s. Her 2000s work includes Mad magazine, and such DC Comics characters as Harley Quinn, Power Girl, and Atlee.

Her other published work includes illustrations for The New York Times and Revolver magazine, advertising work for products such as Arm & Hammer, Playskool, design work for ABC's Nightline, and commercials for A&E's Biography magazine.

== Early life ==
Amanda Conner studied at The Kubert School in Dover, New Jersey. She names as influences Joe Kubert, for teaching his students to compose pages as if they were to be devoid of any dialogue or word balloons, and Frank Miller for his pacing and his ability to create tension and intense action and reactions.

== Career ==
Gatecrasher: Ring Of Fire #4 (June 2000). Cover art by Amanda Conner (penciler), Jimmy Palmiotti (inker)

Conner worked at a color separation company, which handled comics coloring prior to the industry adoption of computer programs such as Photoshop. She subsequently worked in a comic book store. At the time she lived a little over an hour from New York City, and on her days off, would travel to New York City with her father, and use his office at the advertising industry where he worked as a home base from which to call editors at Marvel Comics and DC Comics to request a portfolio review. When granted these interviews, she was told that she had potential, but needed to work on her art more. At this same time she became acquainted with professional artists through her work at the comic shop, and answered an advertisement by artist Bill Sienkiewicz, who was seeking an assistant. She took the job, which became her first comics work, while continuing to show her portfolio to editors at Marvel and DC. She also illustrated storyboards for the advertising industry. After about her sixth or seventh time showing her portfolio, Marvel editor Greg Wright gave Conner her first illustration assignment, an 11-page Yellowjacket back-up story in Solo Avengers #12 (November 1988).

Her other early work includes Excalibur and Suburban Jersey Ninja She-Devils for Marvel, Strip AIDS U.S.A. for Last Gasp in 1988, and Archie and The Adventures of Bayou Billy stories for Archie Comics in 1989–90. During this time, she worked with Marvel editor and artist Jimmy Palmiotti (now her husband), who often inks over Conner's pencils.

From 1993 to 1994 she penciled issues #1–10 of Peter David and Richard Howell's creator-owned series, Soulsearchers and Company, which was published by Claypool Comics. In 1994 she penciled Barbie Fashion #43, a Marvel Comics title that was licensed from the Mattel doll. That same year she did her first Vampirella work with Vengeance of Vampirella, a mini-comic that was bundled with an issue of Wizard magazine. The following year she pencilled issues 1-6 and 9-11 of Marvel's Gargoyles, which was based on the Disney animated television series of the same name. In 1996 she pencilled Kid Death & Fluffy Spring Break Special #1 for Topps Comics and Tomoe #3 for Billy Tucci's Crusade Comics. She also returned to Vampirella with Harris' Vampirella Lives #1–3, which teamed her with writer Warren Ellis.

In 1997 she illustrated the intercompany crossover Painkiller Jane vs. The Darkness for Event Comics. It was in working on this book that Conner says that she found her niche in the industry, explaining that the licensed characters she had previously worked on, particularly Barbie and Vampirella (the latter of which she stresses she nonetheless enjoyed for the writers she worked with) had narrow emotional ranges, which limited the facial expressions she was able to render. On PKJ v. the Darkness she discovered that it was possible to render material of a dark tone that incorporated black humor. Conner returned to Painkiller Jane with a #0 issue, which recounted the character's origin.

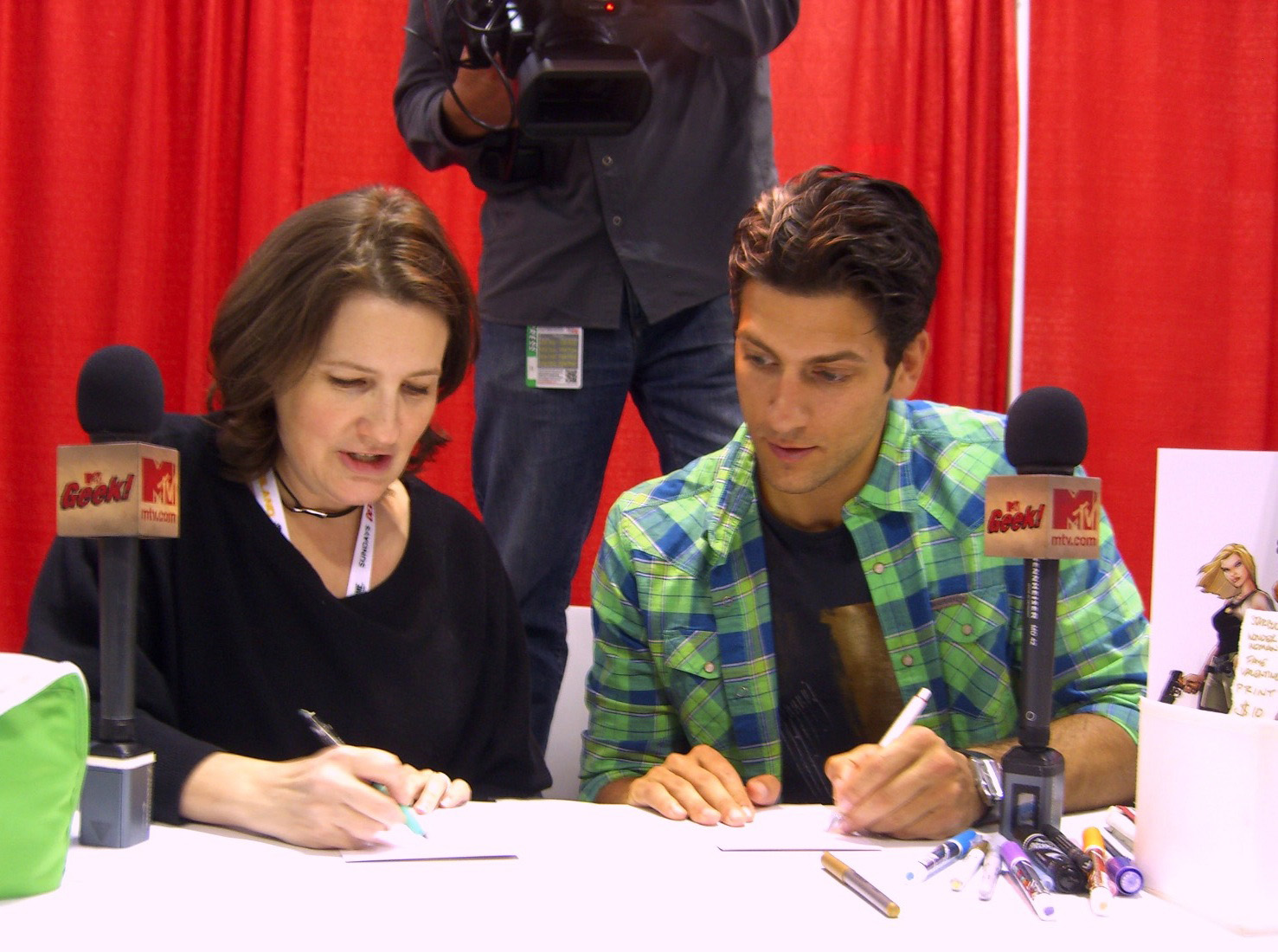
Conner sketching with Kenny Santucci for a segment for MTV Geek at the 2012 New York Comic Con

Her other comic book credits include Lois Lane, Codename: Knockout, and Birds of Prey for DC Comics, as well as Two-Step with writer Warren Ellis for the Cliffhanger! imprint of WildStorm Comics (owned by DC Comics); X-Men Unlimited for Marvel; Gatecrasher, which she co-created for Black Bull Comics; and The Pro, a creator-owned book for Image Comics with Palmiotti and Garth Ennis. In 2005, she illustrated the origin of Power Girl in JSA Classified #1-4. She also penciled a Blade comic to go with the special DVD edition.

Her art has appeared on ABC'S Nightline, and in The New York Times and MAD magazine. She has also done promotional artwork for the reality television series Who Wants to Be a Superhero? and the 2007 feature film Underdog. She does spot illustrations in Revolver magazine each month. Her commercial art work includes illustrations for the New York City advertising agencies Kornhauser & Calene, and Kidvertisers, for such accounts as Arm & Hammer, Playskool, and Nickelodeon. Nike, Inc. commissioned Conner and fellow comics artist Jan Duursema to design the Make Yourself: A Super Power advertising campaign in 2011.

Conner did modeling/art reference work for the Marvel miniseries Elektra: Assassin in the 1980s, and for artist Joe Jusko's Punisher / Painkiller Jane in 2000.

Conner, Palmiotti, and writer Justin Gray work together via their multimedia entertainment company PaperFilms. They collaborated on the Terra miniseries, which premiered in November 2008, and the first 12 issues of the Power Girl ongoing series, which were published between 2009 and 2010, both of which Conner penciled. in 2009, Conner drew the Supergirl story in Wednesday Comics which also featured appearance by Krypto and Streaky the Supercat. Following her departure from Power Girl, Conner wrote and pencilled a story published in Wonder Woman #600, which featured a team-up between Power Girl, Wonder Woman, and Batgirl. IDW Publishing released The Art of Amanda Conner in April 2012 while DC Comics published DC Comics: The Sequential Art of Amanda Conner the following November.

In 2012–2013, Conner drew the Before Watchmen: Silk Spectre limited series which she co-wrote with Darwyn Cooke. Cooke had insisted on having Conner as a collaborator on the series, stating that "I knew I had something to say about Laurie, and I needed somebody to collaborate with who could help realize it. The only person I know alive that could do that was Amanda. So I kind of made it a fuck-or-walk situation, you know? [Laughs.] 'We get Amanda, or I can’t do this.' So that made it incumbent upon [DC co-publisher] Dan [DiDio] to bring Amanda into it." Conner and Palmiotti launched a Harley Quinn ongoing series in November 2013.

She provided the design concepts for the DC Universe streaming Harley Quinn animated series. Many of the story line ideas and dialog have been used for source material on the episodes. These concepts have also been launching points for both the Birds of Prey and Suicide Squad feature movies.

Conner's art was featured in "The Perspiration Implementation", the October 19, 2015, episode of the American sitcom The Big Bang Theory. In the episode, comic book store owner Stuart Bloom asks the women for ideas on how to attract more women to his shop, and Amy Farrah Fowler (Mayim Bialik) points out that an illustration hanging on one of the shop's walls, "Girl on a Leash", may not be conducive to attracting female customers. The image, which was illustrated by Conner and colored by Paul Mounts, depicts a scantily-clad woman being held on a chain leash by a muscular, whip-wielding masked man. The piece was custom-drawn for the show by Conner.

In 2015, Conner was voted as the #2 top female comics artist of all time.

On May 18, 2019, at the Comic Con Revolution event in Ontario, California, Conner was named the 2019 recipient of the Joe Kubert Distinguished Storyteller Award, which is given to "outstanding comic book creators who exemplify both Joe Kubert's artistic talent and his commitment to nurturing the comic book community."

== Technique and materials ==
Power Girl, from JSA Classified #1 (Sept. 2005). Art by Amanda Conner.

While reading each page of a script, Conner does tiny thumbnail sketches with stick figures corresponding to the story indicated on each page, in order to help her design the page's layout. She then does tighter, more elaborate sketches, though still fairly small compared with the finished artwork, approximately 4 in × 6 in (100 mm × 150 mm), and then blows those up on a photocopier to the proper original comic art size, which is 10 inches x 15 inches. She then uses "very tight pencils" to light-box it onto Bristol board, if she intends to have it inked by her husband and collaborator, Jimmy Palmiotti, but will do the pencils "lighter and looser" if she intends to ink it herself, as she already knows how she wants the artwork rendered.

Conner has created her own paper stock and blue line format on her drawing paper, because, she explains, she likes having those configurations pre-printed on the page, and feels that "sometimes the rough is too toothy and the smooth is too slick." The stock she uses is the 10 in × 15 in (250 mm × 380 mm) Strathmore 500 series, but she also orders a custom 8 in × 12 in (200 mm × 300 mm) stock because she sometimes finds those dimensions more comfortable and easier to work on more quickly. She also finds the Strathmore 300 series "pretty good", in that she appreciates its texture and greater affordability, but says that she must occasionally contend with getting a "bleedy batch".

Conner uses mechanical pencils with .03 lead because she finds it easier to use than regular pencils that require her to stop and sharpen them frequently. When working on one of her own projects, such as The Pro, she prefers to letter the art herself, before the inking stage, as she appreciates the handmade, organic look and feel of hand lettering, in contrast to the computer lettering with which most books are currently produced. To ink her own artwork, she uses Staedtler .03, .01 and .005 technical pen, and will sometimes use a Copic .005 for extremely fine work, as these implements feel better in her hands than crowquills and brushes. As her artwork is open and lacks much shading, Conner feels that Paul Mounts is a compatible colorist for her work, as he achieves "the right amount of bounciness or moodiness, depending on what's needed." Conner has stated that her favorite things to draw are facial expressions and body language.

== Personal life ==
Conner has lived in Los Angeles; Jacksonville, Florida; and Connecticut. She and her husband and frequent collaborator Jimmy Palmiotti lived in Brooklyn, New York City but as of 2010 live in Florida, which Palmiotti referred to in an interview as the "sixth borough of New York."

== Awards ==
- 2010 Inkwell Awards All-in-One Award
- 2014 Inkpot Award.
- 2019 Joe Kubert Distinguished Storyteller Award

== Bibliography ==
=== Archie Comics ===
- The Adventures of Bayou Billy # 1–4 (1989–1990)

=== Black Bull Entertainment ===
- Gatecrasher #1-6 (2000–2001)
- Gatecrasher: Ring of Fire #1-4 (2000)

=== Claypool Comics ===
- Soulsearchers and Company #1–10 (1993–1995)

=== DC Comics ===
- 9-11: The World's Finest Comic Book Writers & Artists Tell Stories to Remember, Volume Two (2002)
- Ame-Comi Girls Featuring Wonder Woman #1 (2012)
- Batgirl #65–66
- Before Watchmen: Silk Spectre #1–4 (2012)
- Birds of Prey #47–49 (2002–2003)
- Codename: Knockout #6, 9, 13–14 (2001–2002)
- Green Arrow/Black Canary Wedding Special #1 (2007)
- Harley Quinn vol. 2 #0, 1–30, Annual #1 (2014–2016)
- Harley Quinn vol. 3 #1–26, 28-34 (2016-2018)
- Harley Quinn and Power Girl #1–6 (2015–2016)
- Harley Quinn: Futures End #1 (2014)
- Harley Quinn Holiday Special #1 (2015)
- Harley Quinn Invades San Diego Comic-Con #1 (2014)
- Harley Quinn: Our Worlds at War #1 (2001)
- Harley Quinn: Road Trip Special #1 (2015)
- Harley Quinn Valentine's Day Special #1 (2015)
- Harley's Little Black Book #1–5 (2016–2017)
- Joker: Last Laugh Secret Files #1 (2001)
- JSA Classified #1–4 (2005)
- Legion of Super-Heroes vol. 5 #13–14 (2006)
- Looney Tunes #100 (2003)
- Power Girl #1–12 (2009–2010)
- Secret Origins 80-Page Giant #1 (1998)
- Starman #14 (1995)
- Supergirl vol. 5 #12 (2007)
- Superman: Lois Lane #1 (GirlFrenzy) (1998)
- Terra #1–4 (2009)
- Two-Step #1–3 (2003–2004)
- Wednesday Comics #1–12 (Supergirl) (2009)
- Wonder Woman #600 ("Fuzzy Logic" short story) (2010)

=== Event Comics ===
- Kid Death & Fluffy Spring Break Special #1 (1996)
- Legends of Kid Death & Fluffy #1 (1997)
- Painkiller Jane #0 (1999)
- Painkiller Jane/Darkchylde #1
- Painkiller Jane vs. The Darkness: "Stripper" #1 (1997)

=== Harris Comics ===
- Vampirella Death and Destruction #1-3 (1996)
- Vampirella: Halloween Trick & Treat #1 (2004)
- Vampirella Lives #1–3 (1996–1997)
- Vampirella Monthly #1–3 ("Ascending Evil") and #7–9 ("Queen's Gambit," (with Billy Tucci's SHI)) (1997)
- Vampirella 25th anniversary special (1996)
- Vengeance of Vampirella (1996) Wizard #55 supplemental mini-comic
- Vengeance of Vampirella (1996) #25

=== Image Comics ===
- The Pro #1 (2002)

=== Marvel Comics ===
- Avengers West Coast Annual #4 (1989)
- Barbie #3–4 (1991)
- Black Panther vol. 2 #8 (1999)
- Daredevil vol. 2 #½
- Excalibur #80 (1994)
- Gargoyles #1–6, 9–11 (1995)
- Marvel Adventures: Spider-Man #14
- Marvel Super-Heroes #3 (Wasp) (1990)
- Marvel Romance Redux: Guys & Dolls #1
- Nick Fury's Howling Commandos #3 (2006)
- She-Hulk vol. 2 #3
- Solo Avengers #12 (Yellowjacket) (1988)
- Star Wars #1 (variant cover) (2015)
- Suburban Jersey Ninja She-Devils #1 (1992)
- X-Men Unlimited #35 (2002)
