= Leah Williams =

American comic book writer

- Born: February 17, 1988(?); Oxford, Mississippi
- Occupation: Comic book writer
- Writing career
- Notable works: Gwenpool Strikes Back; Amazing Mary Jane; X-Factor; Power Girl

Leah Williams is an American comic book writer. She is best known for her work on X-Men titles, namely X-Factor as well as DC Comics' Power Girl.

== Life and career ==
Leah Williams grew up Mississippi and before she became a professional writer she worked at an comic shop. She is bisexual. After she published the young adult novel, The Alchemy of Being Fourteen, she was approached via e-mail by Marvel Comics editor Chris Robinson, who was a long-time follower of Williams' Tumblr account and became a fan of her writing and her extensive knowledge of the Marvel Universe. Williams first comic would be a tie-in issue of The Totally Awesome Hulk for the Monsters Unleashed crossover event. The story is called Math Is Magic and follows the twin sister of Amadeus Cho and Lady Hellbender. It was released on March 1, 2017.

== Bibliography ==
=== Comics ===
DC Comics

- Lazarus Planet: Assault on Krypton #1 (back-up story, illustrated by Marguerite Sauvage, January 2023)
  - Collected in Power Girl Returns (trade paperback, 88 pages, 2023, ISBN 978-1779524072)
- Action Comics #1051–1053 (back-up story, illustrated by Marguerite Sauvage, January–March 2023)
  - Collected in Power Girl Returns
- Power Girl Special #1 (illustrated by Marguerite Sauvage, May 2023)
  - Collected in Power Girl Returns
- Power Girl (vol. 3) #1–20 (illustrated by Eduardo Pansica, Adriana Melo & David Baldeón, September 2023–April 2025)
  - Collected in Power Girl – Volume 1: Electric Dreams (#1–7, trade paperback, 144 pages, 2024, ISBN 978-1779528148)
  - Collected in Power Girl – Volume 2: More Than a Crush (#8–13, trade paperback, 136 pages, 2024, ISBN 978-1799500513)
  - Collected in Power Girl – Volume 3: The Star (#14–20, trade paperback, 160 pages, 2025, ISBN 978-1799501701)
- Absolute Power: Task Force VII #1 (illustrated by Caitlin Yarsky, July 2024)
  - Collected in Absolute Power: Task Force VII (trade paperback, 176 pages, 2025, ISBN 978-1799500223)
- Gotham City Sirens (vol. 2) #1–4 (illustrated by Matteo Lolli, Daniel Hillyard, Brandt & Stein, August 2024)
  - Collected in Gotham City Sirens (trade paperback, 120 pages, 2025, ISBN 978-1799500704)
- Gotham City Sirens: Unfit for Orbit #1–5 (illustrated by Haining, July 2025)

IDW Publishing

- The Addams Family: Charlatan's Web #1–2 (co-written with Chynna Clugston Flores, illustrated by Juan Samu, December 2023–January 2024)

Marvel Comics

- X-Men Gold Annual #1 (co-written with Marc Guggenheim, illustrated by Alitha Martinez, January 2018)
  - Collected in X-Men Gold – Volume 7: Godwar (trade paperback, 136 pages, 2018, ISBN 978-1302909772)
- Age of X-Man: X-Tremists #1–5 (illustrated by Georges Jeanty, February–June 2019)
  - Collected in Age Of X-Man: X-Tremists (trade paperback, 113 pages, 2019, ISBN 978-1302915780)
- Gwenpool Strikes Back #1–5 (illustrated by David Baldeón, August–December 2019)
  - Collected in Gwenpool Strikes Back (trade paperback, 112 pages, 2020, ISBN 978-1302919238)
- Amazing Mary Jane #1–6 (illustrated by Carlos Gómez, Lucas Werneck & Zé Carlos, October 2019–March 2020)
  - Collected in Amazing Mary Jane: Down in Flames, Up in Smoke (#1–5, trade paperback, 112 pages, 2020, ISBN 978-1302920272)
- Doctor Strange: The End #1 (illustrated by Filipe Andrade, January 2020)
  - Collected in The End (trade paperback, 232 pages, 2020, ISBN 978-1302924997)
- X-Factor (vol. 4) #1–10 (illustrated by David Baldeón & Carlos Gómez, July 2020–June 2021)
  - Collected in X-Factor by Leah Williams – Volume 1 (#1–3, 5, trade paperback, 144 pages, 2020, ISBN 978-1302921842)
  - Collected in X of Swords (#4, trade paperback, 720 pages, 2021, ISBN 978-1302927172)
  - Collected in X-Factor by Leah Williams – Volume 2 (#6–10, trade paperback, 136 pages, 2021, ISBN 978-1302921859)
- X-Men: The Trial of Magneto #1–5 (illustrated by Lucas Werneck, August–December 2021)
  - Collected in X-Men: The Trial of Magneto (trade paperback, 152 pages, 2022, ISBN 978-1302932176)
- X-Terminators (vol. 2) #1–5 (illustrated by Carlos Gómez, September 2022–January 2023)
  - Collected in X-Terminators (trade paperback, 120 pages, 2023, ISBN 978-1302946999)

== Awards and nominations ==
- 2021 GLAAD Media Award for Outstanding Comic Book — X-Factor (Marvel Comics) — Nomination
