= Power Girl =

DC Comics superheroine

- Power Girl taken from a variant cover of Power Girl #1 (September 2023). Art by Natali Sanders.

Publication information
- Publisher: DC Comics
- First appearance: All Star Comics #58 (January/February 1976)
- Created by: Gerry Conway; Ric Estrada; Wally Wood

In-story information
- Alter ego: Birth name: Kara Zor-L / Kara Zor-El (post-Flashpoint); Civilian identities: Karen Starr, Paige Stetler
- Species: Kryptonian
- Place of origin: Krypton (Earth-Two)
- Team affiliations: Justice Society of America; Justice League; Infinity, Inc. Birds of Prey
- Partnerships: Arion; Supergirl (Kara Zor-El); Huntress (Helena Wayne); Natasha Irons; Omen
- Notable aliases: Kara of Atlantis; Nightwing; Super-Girl
- Abilities: List: Superhuman strength, stamina, endurance, speed, agility, reflexes, intelligence, longevity, and hearing; Solar radiation absorption; Enhanced vision; EM spectrum vision; Microscopic vision; X-ray vision; Telescopic vision; Infra-red vision; Invulnerability; Ice and wind breath; Flight; Heat vision; Portal creation

Power Girl, also known as Kara Zor-L, Karen Starr, and Paige Stetler, is a superheroine appearing in American comic books by DC Comics, making her first appearance in All Star Comics #58 (January/February 1976). Power Girl is the cousin of the superhero Superman, but from an alternate universe in the fictional multiverse in which DC Comics stories are set. Originally hailing from the world of Earth-Two, first envisioned as the home of DC's wartime heroes as published in 1940s comic books, Power Girl becomes stranded in the main universe where DC stories are set, and becomes acquainted with that world's Superman and her own counterpart, Supergirl.

In common with Supergirl's origin story, she is the daughter of Superman's aunt and uncle and a native of the planet Krypton. The infant Power Girl's parents enabled her to escape the destruction of her home planet by placing her in a rocket ship. Although she left the planet at the same time that Superman did, her ship took much longer to reach Earth-Two. On Earth, as with other Kryptonians, Power Girl discovered she possessed abilities like super strength, flight, and heat vision, using which she became a protector of innocents and a hero for humanity. Though the specifics of how vary over subsequent retellings, Power Girl is later stranded on another Earth when a cosmic crisis affects her home of Earth-Two, and later carves out a separate identity for herself from her dimensional counterpart Supergirl once they are forced to coexist.

Although she and Supergirl are biologically the same person, there are vast differences between the two. Power Girl is older and more level-headed due to her maturity, and her fighting style is more aggressive. She also adopts a different secret identity from her counterpart. These changes are reflected in their differing costumes and superhero names as well; Power Girl sports a bob of blond hair and wears a distinctive white, red, and blue costume with a cleavage-displaying cutout. The name Power Girl reflects that she chooses not to be seen as a derivative of Superman, but rather her own hero and this choice is reflected in the strong independent attitude of the character. Over various decades, Power Girl has been depicted as a member of superhero teams such as the Justice Society of America, Infinity, Inc., Justice League Europe, the Sovereign Seven, and the Birds of Prey.

Power Girl's origin has gone through revisions, but over time has reverted to her original conception as the Supergirl of Earth-Two. The 1985 limited series Crisis on Infinite Earths eliminated Earth-Two from history, causing her to be retconned as the granddaughter of an Atlantean sorcerer known as Arion. This was an unpopular change and writers depicted the revised Power Girl inconsistently. The 2005–2006 Infinite Crisis limited series then restored her status as a refugee from the Krypton of the destroyed Pre-Crisis Earth-Two universe. This has been her consistent depiction ever since.

== Publication history ==
Power Girl was introduced in All Star Comics #58 in 1976, and was a member of the superhero team the Justice Society of America through the remainder of the 1970s and 1980s period known as the Bronze Age of Comics. Marvel Comics' then-publisher Stan Lee said in 1978 that when DC Comics created Power Girl after Marvel had introduced Power Man, "I'm pretty annoyed about that. ...I've got to ask the Marvel lawyer – she's supposed to be starting a lawsuit about that and I haven't heard anything. I don't like the idea. ... You know, years ago we brought out Wonder Man, and [DC Comics] sued us because they had Wonder Woman, and ... I said okay, I'll discontinue Wonder Man. And all of a sudden they've got Power Girl. Oh, boy. How unfair." Ironically, Marvel had previously published Thor #207, written by Power Girl co-creator Gerry Conway, in which Len Wein's character says, "Whoever heard of Powergirl, anyhow?"

After All Star Comics was canceled as a part of the DC Implosion, the character would continue to appear along with the rest of the JSA in Adventure Comics for a six-issue run. Due in part to her being one of the more popular characters in All Star Comics at the time, she was given a solo tryout in Showcase issues 97–99, which expanded on her pre-Crisis origin. During this time, she was a regularly featured character in the annual Justice Society crossovers in the original Justice League of America series. She was a founding member of Infinity Inc., appearing in each of the first 12 issues and making later guest appearances.

After DC's continuity-altering Crisis on Infinite Earths storyline, her origin was retconned in Secret Origins (vol. 2) #11 and she became a magic-based character with ties to ancient Atlantis, leading to appearances in The Warlord. The character did not receive her own self-titled series until the Power Girl miniseries of 1988. The character became a featured member of Justice League Europe (a spin off from Justice League International) for the run of the series. After the cancellation of JLI, the character joined Chris Claremont's creator-owned series Sovereign Seven and appeared in several issues of Birds of Prey. She eventually rejoined the Justice Society in JSA #31 and became a regular part of that series and its follow-up, Justice Society of America vol. 3.

Power Girl played a significant role in the continuity-changing events of Infinite Crisis (2005), which tied into her starring role in the first JSA: Classified story arc "Power Trip" in 2005 (issues #1–4 of the series). These stories heavily featured the revelation that Power Girl was in fact the Earth-Two Power Girl and a Kryptonian, who survived Crisis, and that her Atlantean backstory had been a lie. Starting in July 2009, Power Girl received her first ongoing series, simply titled Power Girl (vol. 2), with the first twelve issues written by Jimmy Palmiotti and Justin Gray, drawn by Amanda Conner, and colored by Paul Mounts. According to Comic Book Resources, the series has been "wildly praised for its fresh and fun approach."

When Palmiotti, Grey and Conner left the series after issue #12, Palmiotti said, "Amanda always said she could just commit to the book for a year, and as we got into the series we realized that we just couldn't do the same type of book with another artist at this point and decided it was a good idea to leave with her and give another team a shot." Judd Winick took over as writer with artist Sami Basri beginning with issue #13. Winick stated that the tone of the book will continue, and the premise of the character in New York.

The trade paperback "Power Girl" (ISBN 978-1401209681) collects Showcase issues #97–99, Secret Origins (vol. 2) issue #11, JSA issues 32 and 39, and JSA: Classified issues #1–4. "Power Girl: A New Beginning" (ISBN 978-1401226183) collects the first six issues of the 2009 series. "Power Girl: Aliens & Apes" (ISBN 978-1401229108) collects issues 7 through 12, and "Power Girl: Bomb Squad" (ISBN 978-1401231620) covers 13 to 18, and "Power Girl: Old Friends" collecting issues 19–27. The entirety of the Palmiotti/Grey/Conner run is contained in "Power Girl: Power Trip" (ISBN 9781401243074) which collects JSA: Classified #1–4 and Power Girl #1–12.

== Fictional character biography ==
=== Journey from Krypton-Two ===
Kara's father discovers that Krypton is about to explode, and places her in a spacecraft directed towards the Earth. Although this occurs at the same time that Kal-L's ship is launched, Kara's ship travels more slowly, and she arrives on Earth decades after her cousin has landed. Kara's Symbioship is designed to keep her in stasis during the journey and provide her with life experiences and education in the form of virtual reality. The Symbioship allows her to interact with virtual copies of her parents and fellow Kryptonians. Originally, by the time she arrives on Earth, Kara is shown to be in her early twenties. However, as mentioned in JSA: Classified #1, her age at arrival has now been retconned to eighteen in post-Crisis continuity.

In Showcase #97, Kara is reclaimed by the sentient Symbioship, which forcibly re-immerses her into Kandorian society. Kara spends several virtual years inside the ship, eventually marrying and having a child. She is freed with the assistance of newspaper reporter Andrew Vinson and destroys the ship in anger for manipulating her emotions.

=== Debut ===
Power Girl's existence is not revealed to the general public until much later; her cousin Clark and his wife Lois Lane provide her a family environment to assist her transition towards real life relationships. In her first recorded adventure, Kara assists Justice Society members Flash and Wildcat with containing an artificially induced volcanic eruption in China. She then joins Robin and Star-Spangled Kid to form a Super Squad to assist the Justice Society in defeating Brainwave and Per Degaton, who were causing disasters around the world. She pushes their base towards the Sun, the heat causing the villains to fall unconscious. Later, she becomes a full member of the Society when Superman retires from active membership.

Having been raised by the Symbioship with artificial Kryptonian life experiences, Power Girl finds it difficult to adapt to life on Earth. With Vinson's help, she eventually creates a fictional human identity: red-haired computer programmer and businesswoman Karen Starr (she obtains her knowledge in this field from exposure to Wonder Woman's Purple Ray on Paradise Island). As Starr, Power Girl establishes her own software and IT company, Starr Enterprises. On the pre-Crisis Earth-Two, Power Girl's closest friend is the Huntress, the daughter of the Earth-Two Batman and Catwoman.

The first contact between Power Girl and Earth-One's universe was on the crossover Justice League of America #147, written by Paul Levitz & Martin Pasko, where the character shows her attraction to that reality saying, "It has a much nicer brand of Superman, y'know?".

=== Atlantean ===
The 1985–1986 Crisis on Infinite Earths limited series erased the existence of the Earth-Two Superman, and Power Girl's continuity was thus substantially disrupted. Initially she believed herself to be Superman's cousin, as she had been before the reboot. However, her background was retconned; she was told that she was the descendant of the Atlantean sorcerer Arion, and was frozen in suspended animation for millennia until the present day.

After the Justice Society disbands, Power Girl would join the Justice League. Later, while a member of Justice League Europe, she suffers a near fatal injury while battling a mystical being. Superman must assist in her medical treatment, using his heat-vision to perform surgery on her otherwise-invulnerable tissues. Although she recovers, Power Girl is significantly weaker, as she lost her vision powers and could not fly for a time. However, she regained them all as time went on. Power Girl adopts a one-eyed mangy cat, an animal which would affect much of the team. One aspect of this is her beloved cat is used to spy on the group by intelligence gathering criminals.

During the 1994 event Zero Hour: Crisis in Time!, Power Girl experiences a mystical pregnancy and gives birth to a son (supposedly named Equinox), who ages rapidly. Equinox later disappears and has not appeared since.

Power Girl appeared in later issues of the Sovereign Seven series, Chris Claremont's creator-owned comic book for DC. However, the final issue revealed that the entire series had been a story appearing in a comic book, and events in the book have had no bearing upon DC continuity.

Power Girl was one of Oracle's first agents. Their short-lived partnership ended after a disastrous mission which resulted in a large loss of life. Power Girl believes that Oracle's poor leadership was responsible for the tragedy, disgusted that Oracle would sacrifice hundreds of lives and herself following orders. Although she has worked with her again on a few occasions when needed, the relationship between the two is tense. In Birds of Prey #35, Power Girl admitted that she is primarily to blame for the tension but is unable to overcome her memories of the deaths.

Power Girl is a key member of the Justice Society, which she joined when it was reformed in the late 1990s. During an adventure with the JSA, she meets Arion, who reveals her Atlantean heritage to be a lie he concocted at the behest of Power Girl's "mother".

While attempting to save her teammate Ted Grant from Crimson Avenger, Power Girl is severely wounded by supernatural bullets. Despite being saved by Doctor Mid-Nite, Power Girl comments that her near-death experience has shown her that she needs to make more personal connections outside of the superhero community. This leads her to focus more on developing her human side as Karen Starr.

=== Infinite Crisis ===
==== JSA: Classified – Power Trip ====
The Psycho-Pirate shows Kara multiple versions of her origin in an effort to drive her insane. Eventually, he reveals the truth: Power Girl is a survivor of Krypton from the dimension which contained the pre-Crisis Earth-Two.

==== The other survivors ====
In the "Infinite Crisis" storyline, Kal-L himself returns to the post-Crisis DC Universe after breaking down the walls of the paradise dimension in which he, Lois Lane Kent (of Earth-Two), Alexander Luthor Jr. (of Earth-Three), and Superboy-Prime (of Earth-Prime) had been living since the end of Crisis on Infinite Earths. Appalled by the rapidly deteriorating state of affairs on the contemporary Earth, their goal is to replace the post-Crisis Earth with a recreated Earth-Two. Kal-L's first order of business is to track down Power Girl and explain the events of the original Crisis to her. Kal-L also reiterates her pre-Crisis history as his cousin. A touch from the ailing Lois of Earth-Two inexplicably restores Power Girl's memories of pre-Crisis Earth-Two.

Soon after this revelation, Power Girl is confronted by Superboy-Prime, who renders her unconscious. She is attached to a "tuning fork", a device controlled by Alex Luthor whose purpose is to bring back the multiple Earths. Alex Luthor and Psycho-Pirate coerce Black Adam (who is also attached to the machine) into saying "SHAZAM!", and use magical energy to power the tower. After the reappearance of the created Earth-Two, everyone associated with that Earth is transported onto it (although Power Girl remains on New Earth because of her proximity to the tower).

After being brought to the barren created Earth-Two by Kal-L, Lois Lane Kent collapses and dies. A violent confrontation between the two Supermen ensues, at the end of which Kal-L comes to the realization that this created Earth-Two had not been a perfect world, since "a perfect earth doesn't need a Superman."

Power Girl is freed by Wonder Girl and Conner Kent, and joins them in fighting Superboy-Prime and Alex Luthor. During a savage battle on Mogo, Superboy-Prime beats Kal-L to death and is later subdued by Kal-El. Power Girl is brought to Mogo by the Green Lantern Corps just in time to bid a farewell to her dying cousin.

=== "One Year Later" ===
In the "One Year Later" storyline in Supergirl, Kara takes up the mantle of Nightwing in an attempt to free the natives of Kandor. Ultraman, masquerading as Kal-El and working in concert with the Saturn Queen, has taken control of the bottle city. Kara Zor-El is the city's Flamebird; she prevents Ultraman's forces from executing the captured Power Girl. Power Girl is forced to leave Kandor with Kara (against her better judgment) after Saturn Queen reveals to Supergirl information about Supergirl's past and purpose. This causes another rift to grow between the two women, as Power Girl feels Supergirl left an entire city of people to suffer, all because of her own selfish desires. This animosity is still on display when she next encounters Supergirl.

Power Girl remains a core member of the Justice Society. Power Girl is selected as the chairwoman of the team after Mr. Terrific steps down.

Power Girl is invited to rejoin Oracle's Birds of Prey, but refuses, stating that she would do so only "when Hell freezes over". Her ill will toward Oracle is the result of a single mission in which she served as one of Oracle's agents, which ended badly. However, Power Girl does come to Oracle's aid against the new female Spy Smasher's attempt to take over the group.

The appearance of the Earth-22 Superman (and his resemblance to Kal-L) upsets Kara greatly when he first arrives on New Earth. However, they adopt each other as family after a period of time.

Following the events of Infinite Crisis, a new Multiverse is created. Among them is an Earth-2 from which its Power Girl and Superman are both missing. The Power Girl of this Earth returns to Earth-2 after failing to find her cousin. The Power Girl of New Earth is accidentally sent to the pre-Crisis Earth-2 by the Third World god Gog.

The Power Girl of New Earth faces off against the Power Girl and Justice Society Infinity of the new Earth-2, due to the Earth-2 Power Girl's grief and rage over the loss of her cousin prompting her to believe that the "other" Power Girl is an impostor with some role in Superman's absence. Power Girl returns to New Earth with the help of the Earth-2 Michael Holt, until the Justice Society Infinity follow her and take her back to Earth-2, where it is revealed that the recreation of the Multiverse created a new Earth-2 and duplicates of its heroes, including its own Power Girl. The Power Girl of New Earth then returns home with the JSA.

=== Solo series and All-Stars ===
Cover of Power Girl vol. 1 #1 (June 1988). Art by Kerry Gammill and Dick Giordano.

Power Girl briefly appears in the Final Crisis crossover event, battling the forces of Darkseid after he conquers the Earth using the Anti-Life Equation.

After deciding to once again use the Karen Starr identity, she moves to New York City and begins rebuilding Starr Enterprises while continuing solo superheroics. She eventually takes teenaged hero-in-training Terra as her sidekick following the horrific events depicted in the Terror Titans mini-series. After the duo fight off a robot invasion of the city, Power Girl is kidnapped by the new Ultra-Humanite, who plans to transplant his brain into her body. Using her ice breath to destroy her gravity enhanced shackles and gag, Power Girl easily defeats the villain and saves New York. She also helps a trio of lost alien princesses and their bodyguard adjust to life on Earth, buying them a home in South America to stay until they can get back to their home planet.

Following a massive battle that ends in the destruction of the Justice Society's HQ, the team decides to split up into two separate squads. Power Girl partners with Magog to start a more youth-oriented team dubbed the JSA All-Stars. Using Stargirl as leverage, the two are able to convince all of the teen JSA members except Jennifer Pierce to join the All-Stars. During the team's inaugural press conference, they are attacked by a group of mercenaries led by the villainous nephew of Sylvester Pemberton. Karen and her team emerge victorious, only to discover that Pemberton has kidnapped Stargirl during the confusion of the battle. The team eventually rescues Stargirl.

=== Blackest Night and Brightest Day ===
During the 2009–2010 "Blackest Night" storyline, both JSA teams gather in Manhattan to stave off the invading Black Lantern Corps. Several of the team members examine the corpses of Kal-L and Psycho-Pirate, both of whom had been reanimated as Black Lanterns only to be killed again during a battle with Superboy and Superman. Karen breaks down in tears upon seeing the twisted corpse of Kal-L, and swears vengeance upon whoever is behind the creation of the Black Lanterns. While on her way to the streets of Manhattan to assist her teammates, Karen hears Ma Hunkel screaming. She rushes to her side, only to see Ma being attacked by the Black Lantern Lois Lane-Kent of pre-Crisis Earth-Two. Black Lantern Lois sacrifices herself by removing her ring and giving it to Kal-L to reanimate him. During the battle between Kal-L and Power Girl, Mr. Terrific invents a machine to destroy the Black Lanterns. He activates the machine and it wipes out the Black Lantern ring connection and completely dissolves Kal-L's corpse.

In the 2010–2011 storyline "Brightest Day", Power Girl attacks her comrades, and after being subdued, is discovered to have been possessed by the Starheart (the cosmic entity that gave Alan Scott and Jade their powers) to which she was vulnerable because of her Kryptonian heritage, as Kryptonians draw their abilities from the sun. Staying out of action in order avoid another possession, she helps Mr. Terrific work on a machine that may be able to damp the Starheart's power. Nonetheless, the Starheart takes control of Miss Martian's body and transforms into her White Martian form, causing her to attack her comrades again. Batman ultimately tells her to stay on Earth and try to fight the other metahumans being controlled by the Starheart, explaining that bringing her along would jeopardize the mission.

=== Generation Lost ===
During the events of Justice League: Generation Lost, Power Girl assists her fellow heroes in a global manhunt to track down Maxwell Lord, the former head of Justice League International and the murderer of Ted Kord, who had been restored to life at the end of "Blackest Night". Lord uses his powers to erase his existence from the minds of everyone on the planet, including Power Girl. She subsequently helps Booster Gold find proof of Lord's existence. Through the course of their search, during which Power Girl encounters Divine, a raven-haired clone of herself, she manages to regain her memory of Lord. As she attempts to inform the Justice Society of this, Lord uses his powers to take control of her and attack the Justice League International, but manages to convince the others of his existence through the exhumation of Ted Kord's corpse.

=== DC Rebirth ===
In the post-Rebirth DC Universe, Power Girl is trapped in an interdimensional void. Tanya Spears tries to free her using an etheric transponder that allows her to travel there in an incorporeal state, but her physical body was disconnected from the machine by an unaware Kid Flash (Wally West), so both women remain trapped as a result.

In Doomsday Clock, the "original" Power Girl returns to the DC Universe when Doctor Manhattan, inspired by Superman, undoes the changes that he made to the New 52 timeline that erased the Justice Society and the Legion of Super-Heroes.

Following the Lazarus Planet storyline, Power Girl is given new psychic abilities by the Lazarus rains and forges a bond with fellow psychic Omen; the two women open a superhero counselling service. To reflect this new phase of her life, Power Girl decides to retire her Karen Starr identity. In Power Girl Special (2023), Power Girl is urged by Jon and Kara to get over her impostor syndrome and "accept" the love and family that the Superman Family so readily want to give her. Kara's diary reveals she feels the most profound personal connection with her counterpart and longs for them to be closer friends. Power Girl later adopts Streaky the Supercat at Kara's behest. Though she loses her psychic abilities in a confrontation with Johnny Sorrow, she is left with a new "astral punch" ability that creates doorways to the astral realm. In the ongoing series, Power Girl establishes her new civilian persona as "Dr. Paige Stetler", technology specialist and columnist for the Daily Planet. In issue #11, the newspaper's editor-in-chief, Lois Lane, who knows of Paige's dual identity, offers her a field-reporter position to enable her to both write longer-form stories from the scene of crises and act as Power Girl to resolve them.

In issue #20 of the Power Girl comic, Kara/Paige learns a woman claiming to be Karen Starr, her old civilian identity, has appeared and is running her old company (and has attacked Omen). Confronting the impostor, she learns that this new "Karen" is actually Ejecta, a shape-shifting super-villain raised and groomed by Symbio, the artificial intelligence that sustained Kara on her journey to Earth. However, when it becomes clear that Ejecta is becoming more interested in managing Starr Enterprises than super-villainy, Kara/Paige decides to let her keep the Karen Starr name.

== Powers and abilities ==
As the biological cousin of Superman, Power Girl exhibits all of the classic Kryptonian powers: super strength; flight; super speed; invulnerability; x-ray, telescopic, microscopic and heat vision; freeze breath; and super-hearing.

Over the years various writers have given Power Girl's Kryptonian power differing levels, either making them consistent with the earlier Earth-Two Superman Kal-L (who represents Superman as depicted in his earliest comic book stories) or power levels largely comparable to those of the modern day Superman and Supergirl. The latter has the favored approach from DC for the last few decades. During some eras of DC Comics, such as the 2000s, Power Girl and other Kryptonians were only affected by Kryptonite from their own universe, making them immune to Kryptonite from all other universes. This rule has not been maintained in later publishing eras (since 2011).

As Karen Starr, she is an accomplished businesswoman and is regarded by Mr. Terrific as a first rate scientist. Even though Power Girl is from an alternative universe, her biology is still similar to Superman's. In her later identity as Paige Steitler, she later pursued new careers in therapy and journalism, although she did not have the same competence with those as in science and technology.

As one of a handful of characters who survived the Crisis on Infinite Earths, DC editorial was initially uncertain how to portray the character and attempted to portray Power Girl with a non-Kryptonian origin for a number of years. Power Girl's abilities have fluctuated since 1986. For some time, Power Girl believed she was an Atlantean. At one point, Power Girl possessed telekinesis; at another she was vulnerable to attacks by certain natural elements (for example, wooden weapons). After sustaining severe injuries from a magic attack Power Girl retained only a degree of super strength, speed and durability. However, she later recovered her ability to fly, and writers have gradually restored her superpowers.

== Physical appearance and costumes ==
Power Girl's original Wally Wood artwork (1976) showed her as relatively busty but otherwise her figure and build conformed in appearance to other contemporary comic book women. However, in Wonder Woman (vol. 3) #34 (2009), written by Gail Simone, Dinah Lance, the Black Canary, mentions Power Girl as having the top bosom of DCU, describing her assets as a "national treasure". Her most common outfit is a leg-baring, figure-hugging, long-sleeved white leotard with a keyhole cut-out opening in the chest.

According to character writer Jimmy Palmiotti, "When the character was created, Wally Wood was the artist that drew Power Girl, and he was convinced that the editors were not paying attention to anything he did. So, [according to] his inker, [he] said ‘Every issue, I'm going to draw the tits bigger until they notice it.’ It took about seven or eight issues before anyone was like, ‘Hey, what's with the tits?’ And that's where they stopped. True story." However, the official DC Comics blog dismisses this story: "That rumor started as a joke that her co-creator Wally Wood told in interviews about something he thought about doing, that some people started taking for granted as truth. Check those original All-Star Comics issues themselves, and you’ll find even the earliest depictions of Power Girl’s proportions to be consistent. People do say the wildest things."

Power Girl was at one time portrayed as having a highly athletic but slender physique. Artists Bart Sears (in the Justice League Europe series), and later Alex Ross (in the limited series Kingdom Come) restored Power Girl's well-endowed shape. Ross rendered her as a heavily muscled Power Woman (as if she was an ardent bodybuilder).

The character is consistently depicted as a large-breasted young woman, and her physique is one of her most recognizable attributes – to the extent that various writers have acknowledged it in both serious and humorous ways.

For example, Justice League Europe #37 (1992) attempts to explain Power Girl's revealing costume by having Crimson Fox question her about it; she receives the reply that the costume "shows what I am: female, healthy. If men want to degrade themselves by staring, that's their problem, I'm not going to apologize for it."

Conversely, in JSA: Classified #2 (2005), writer Geoff Johns has Power Girl explain her cleavage-window to Superman, revealing that "the first time I made this costume, I wanted to have a symbol, like you. I just…I couldn't think of anything. I thought eventually, I'd figure it out. And close the hole. But I haven't." A similar treatment of the character can be seen in Superman/Batman, in which the heroes need to distract Toyman while Batman and Superman battle Captain Marvel and Hawkman. Batman suggests that Power Girl's endowments would be likely to distract Toyman, a 13-year-old boy. Toyman later attempts to make a reference to the size of her chest before being cut off by Superman.

Power Girl's costume design has varied greatly over the years. Her classic costume design from All Star Comics #58 is that which is in use today: a red cape and belt, blue gloves and boots, and a white bodysuit sporting a circular cleavage-exposing cut-out on her chest (its variable size and shape determined by the artist depicting her). According to Gerry Conway, "The true, dumb reason for the circle? At the time, it was a convention for hero costumes to have a chest symbol. I thought a giant 'P' looked silly. The circle was intended as a nod to convention without being conventional. Not a sexy thing at all, until Wally Wood's inks." This window was closed for the first time in All Star Comics #64, pencilled by Wood. According to Conway, it was dictated by publisher Jenette Kahn, because "she felt it was sexist". During her time with Justice League Europe/America, she wears a capeless yellow and white spandex unitard, and later a blue and white spandex unitard with a short mini-cape, headband, and a diamond shaped opening on her chest, once again exposing her cleavage. She has also worn a headband, as had Supergirl prior to her death in Crisis on Infinite Earths. In a guest appearance in Green Lantern, Kara is seen in her large wardrobe closet with every costume design she has ever worn in DC continuity, deciding which costume to wear for that mission. Her original costume returned when Johns and David Goyer had her rejoin the JSA.

In Justice League: Generation Lost #16, she sports a variation of her traditional costume that includes pants.

== Other versions ==
=== Tanya Spears ===
- First appearance: World's Finest #23 (2014)
- Created by: Paul Levitz
- Teams: Teen Titans, Defiance, Starr Industries, Massachusetts Institute of Technology
- Abilities: Possess a genius-level intellect, superhuman strength, size alteration, and virtual invulnerability.

Tanya Spears is a successor of Earth-2's version of Power Girl following the New 52, first debuting in World's Finest #23 (July, 2014) and created by writer Paul Levitz. A young and African-American super-genius, the character was also an ally to Karen Starr and a employee at her company, Starr Industries.

The daughter of Karen's friend Somya Spears, who ran Starr Industries in her stead, she is a scientific prodigy who earned a postdoctoral fellowship at M.I.T and works for Starr Industries by age 17. While working at Starr Industries, she was kidnapped by terrorist stealing nuclear isotopes but is saved by Earth-2's Huntress but is exposed to the isotope radiation. Later, when she's attacked by DeSaad as Power Girl and Huntress worked to return to Earth-2 and a Starr Industries lab is destroyed, she discovers her metahuman abilities and also finds that Karen had also legally left her the "Power Girl" name and fortune in a bid to repay her mother through Tanya.

=== Alternate versions ===
- Power Girl appears in a self-titled Ame-Comi one-shot. This version is Kara Jor-El, daughter of Jor-El, cousin of Supergirl, the primary protector of Metropolis, and the head of a corporation that uses Kryptonian technology to better mankind. Additionally, she lacks a secret identity and does not receive her powers from Earth's sun.
- Power Girl appears in DC Comics Bombshells. This version is a clone of Supergirl created by Hugo Strange during the Siege of Leningrad with the intention of fighting her. However, Supergirl convinces Power Girl to betray Strange and join her in escaping.
- A post-Crisis Earth-2 version of Power Girl appears in 52 (2007) and Justice Society (vol. 3). After Mister Mind absorbs several aspects of a multiverse that consisted of 52 parallel realities and altering their histories, Power Girl was rewritten to be an arrogant and aggressive individual who spent years in space searching for her long-lost cousin Superman.
- A red-haired Power Girl makes a minor appearance in Countdown to Final Crisis as a member of the Monarch's army who is killed by Earth-51's Batman.
- A separate Earth 2 version of Power Girl appears in The New 52 series Worlds' Finest Mister Terrific, Earth-2: World's End, Harley Quinn (vol. 2), Harley Quinn and Power Girl (2015), and Supergirl (vol. 6) #19.
- Karen Starr appears in Justice Society of America #37–40 as a prisoner of Kid Karnevil's Neo-Nazi regime who lost her powers after being exposed to the Great Darkness Engine.
- A possible future version of Power Girl appears in "The New Golden Age" as a member of the Justice Society of America before she is killed by Per Degaton.
- An alternate universe version of Power Girl appears in JLA: Another Nail as a partner of Black Canary and Black Orchid.
- An alternate universe version of Power Girl appears in JLA: Created Equal as a member of the Justice League and mother of Kara Zor-L II.
- A possible future, elderly, blind version of Power Girl from the year 2351 named "Old Karrie" appears in Justice League: Generation Lost. This version lost her powers and became the sole survivor of a violent metahuman war instigated by Maxwell Lord 300 years prior. Additionally, two separate possible future versions of Power Girl appear in the series, with one having joined the Justice League and the other taking on white hair, a black bodysuit, bracelets akin to Wonder Woman's, and Superman's S-shield.
- Power Girl, renamed Power Woman, appears in Kingdom Come. This version is more muscular than traditional depictions.
- An alternate universe version of Power Girl appears in Justice League International Annual #5. This version has no memory of where she came from before she arrived on Earth.
- An alternate universe version of Power Girl appears in Tangent Comics. This version is a genetically engineered superhero created by the Chinese government.

== In other media ==
=== Television ===
- A character inspired by Power Girl named Galatea appears in the DC Animated Universe (DCAU) series Justice League Unlimited, voiced by Nicholle Tom. She is a clone of Supergirl, with whom she possesses a mental link, created by Project Cadmus scientist Dr. Emil Hamilton, who views Galatea as his daughter, as a contingency plan against the Justice League should they threaten the U.S. government. Following her introduction in the episode "Fearful Symmetry", Galatea leads Cadmus' forces in a siege on the Justice League's Watchtower in the episodes "Flashpoint" and "Panic in the Sky". However, the League defeat her army while Supergirl puts Galatea herself into a catatonic state.
- A character loosely inspired by Power Girl named Lindsay Harrison appears in the Smallville episode "Covenant", portrayed by Adrianne Palicki. Initially believing her name is Kara and that she is from Krypton, she is later revealed to be a human empowered by Jor-El's technology.
- Power Girl appears in the Mad segment "That's What Super Friends Are For".
- Power Girl appears in Robot Chicken DC Comics Special III: Magical Friendship, voiced by Mae Whitman.
- A variation of Power Girl appears in the DC Super Hero Girls episode "#PowerSurge". After Supergirl (voiced by Nicole Sullivan) is presumed dead following a battle with Livewire, the former reinvents herself as "Power Girl".

=== Film ===
- Power Girl appears in Superman/Batman: Public Enemies, voiced by Allison Mack. This version initially works for President Lex Luthor until Superman is framed for Metallo's murder and she defects from Luthor to help Superman and Batman uncover the truth.
- A villainous, alternate universe version of Power Girl makes a non-speaking cameo appearance in Justice League: Crisis on Two Earths as a minor member of the Crime Syndicate.
- Power Girl makes a cameo appearance in Teen Titans Go! To the Movies.

=== Video games ===
- Power Girl appears as a playable character in DC Universe Online, voiced by Adriene Mishler.
- Power Girl appears as a DLC character in Lego Batman 3: Beyond Gotham.
- Power Girl appears as a "premier skin" for Supergirl in Injustice 2, voiced by Sara Cravens.

=== Miscellaneous ===
- Power Girl appears in the DC Animated Universe (DCAU) comic book tie-ins Adventures in the DC Universe #6, Justice League Unlimited, and Superman and Batman Magazine #1.
- Power Girl appears in Batman: The Brave and the Bold #1.

== In popular culture ==
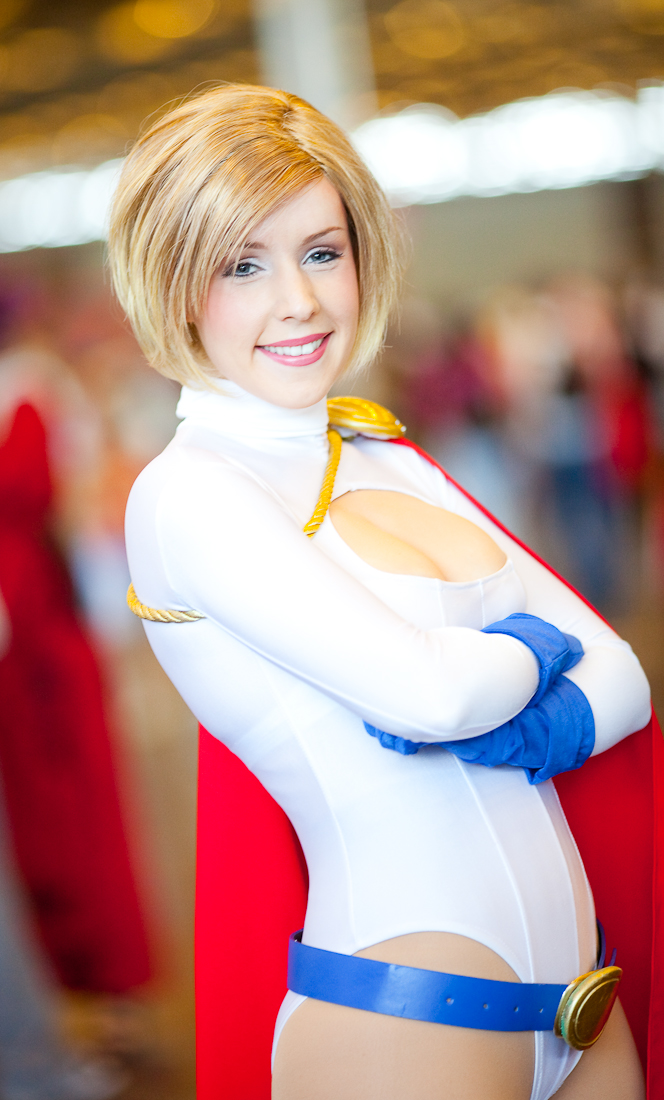
Cosplay of Power Girl at the 2010 Japan Expo in Paris

- Power Girl is a popular cosplay character.
- Power Girl is parodied in Attack of the Show!, portrayed by guest host Carrie Keagan and depicted as a stereotypical "dumb blonde".
- Power Girl was ranked ninth in Comics Buyer's Guide's "100 Sexiest Women in Comics" list.
