= Dawn of X =

Comics event

- The cover of the first trade paperback collection. Art by Pepe Larraz.
- Publisher: Marvel Comics
- Publication date: October 2019 – November 2020
- Genre: Superhero
- Main character(s): Excalibur; Fallen Angels; Hellions; Marauders; New Mutants; Swordbearers of Krakoa; X-Factor; X-Force; X-Men

Creative team
- Writer: Various
- Artist: Various

Dawn of X is a 2019 relaunch of the X-Men line of comic books published by Marvel Comics in the wake of the twin miniseries House of X and Powers of X and is the first phase of the Krakoan Age. This initiative culminated in the crossover event X of Swords, which was followed by a sequel relaunch named "Reign of X" in December 2020.

The story focuses on various groups of mutants living on the small island named Krakoa, which has become recognized as a sovereign nation and has increasingly grown in size.

== Publication history ==
After Jonathan Hickman completed his run on Avengers and New Avengers with the 2015 crossover "Secret Wars", he stepped away from Marvel Comics for a time. His return was announced in March 2019. It was then revealed that he would write two interlocking miniseries called House of X and Powers of X (HOX/POX), with penciling by Pepe Larraz and R. B. Silva respectively. This miniseries also marked a company-wide relaunch of the X-Men.

The Dawn of X initiative was announced at "The Next Big Thing" panel as San Diego Comic-Con 2019. It intended to tell the story of mutantkind in a new status quo established by Hickman after the HOX/POX (July – October 2019) event concluded, with all creative teams working closely under Hickman's supervision; the X-Men brand and its place in the Marvel Universe was redefined.

== Titles ==
=== Prelude series ===
Title	Issues	Writer	Artist	Colorist	Debut date	Conclusion date
House of X	#1–6	Jonathan Hickman	Pepe Larraz	Marte Gracia	July 24, 2019	October 2, 2019
Powers of X	#1–6	Jonathan Hickman	R. B. Silva	Marte Gracia	July 31, 2019	October 9, 2019

=== Ongoing series ===
Title	Issues	Writer(s)	Artist(s)	Colourist(s)	Debut date	Conclusion date
X-Men (vol. 5)	#1–15	Jonathan Hickman	Leinil Francis Yu; R.B. Silva; Matteo Buffagni; Mahmud Asrar	Sunny Gho; Marte Gracia	October 16, 2019	November 25, 2020
Marauders	#1–15	Gerry Duggan; Vita Ayala; Benjamin Percy	Matteo Lolli; Michele Bandini; Lucas Werneck; Mario Del Pennino; Stefano Caselli	Federico Blee; Erick Arciniega; Edgar Delgado	October 23, 2019	November 11, 2020
Excalibur (vol. 4)	#1–15	Tini Howard	Marcus To; Wilton Santos; R. B. Silva; Phil Noto; Mahmud Asrar	Erick Arciniega; Nolan Woodard; Phil Noto; Sunny Gho; Rachelle Rosenberg	October 30, 2019	November 25, 2020
New Mutants (vol. 4)	#1–13	Jonathan Hickman; Ed Brisson	Rod Reis; Flaviano; Marco Failla	Rod Reis; Carlos Lopez	November 6, 2019	October 14, 2020
X-Force (vol. 6)	#1–14	Benjamin Percy	Joshua Cassara; Stephen Segovia; Jan Bazaldua; Viktor Bogdanovic	Dean White; Guru-eFX; Matt Wilson	November 6, 2019	November 18, 2020
Fallen Angels (vol. 2)	#1–6	Bryan Edward Hill	Szymon Kudranski	Frank D'Armata	November 13, 2019	January 29, 2020
Wolverine (vol. 7)	#1–7	Benjamin Percy	Adam Kubert; Viktor Bogdanovic; Joshua Cassara	Frank Martin; Matt Wilson; Guru-eFX	February 19, 2020	November 11, 2020
Cable (vol. 4)	#1–6	Gerry Duggan	Phil Noto		March 11, 2020	November 18, 2020
Hellions	#1–6	Zeb Wells	Stephen Segovia; Carmen Carnero	David Curiel	March 25, 2020	November 18, 2020
X-Factor (vol. 4)	#1–4	Leah Williams	David Baldeón; Carlos Gomez	Israel Silva	July 29, 2020	September 30, 2020

=== Limited series ===
Title	Issues	Writer(s)	Artist(s)	Colorist(s)	Debut date	Conclusion date
X-Men/Fantastic Four	#1–4	Chip Zdarsky	Terry Dodson; Karl Story; Rachel Dodson; Dexter Vines; Mike Getty	Laura Martin; Pete Pantazis; Andrew Crossley	February 5th, 2020	July 22nd, 2020
Empyre: X-Men	#1–4	Jonathan Hickman; Tini Howard; Gerry Duggan; Benjamin Percy; Leah Williams; Vita Ayala; Ed Brisson; Zeb Wells	Matteo Buffagni; Lucas Werneck; Andrea Broccardo; Jorge Molina	Nolan Woodard	July 22, 2020	August 19, 2020
Juggernaut	#1–5	Fabian Nicieza	Ron Garney	Matt Milla	September 23, 2020	January 6, 2021

=== One-shots ===
==== Giant-Size X-Men ====
Title	Writer	Artist	Colorist	Release date
Giant-Size X-Men: Jean Grey and Emma Frost	Jonathan Hickman	Russell Dauterman	Matt Wilson	February 26, 2020
Giant-Size X-Men: Nightcrawler	Jonathan Hickman	Alan Davis	Carlos Lopez	March 25, 2020
Giant-Size X-Men: Magneto	Jonathan Hickman	Ramon Perez	David Curiel	July 15, 2020
Giant-Size X-Men: Fantomex	Jonathan Hickman	Rod Reis		August 5, 2020
Giant-Size X-Men: Storm	Jonathan Hickman	Russell Dauterman	Matt Wilson	September 16, 2020
Giant-Size X-Men: Tribute to Wein & Cockrum	Len Wein	Various		September 30, 2020

==== X of Swords ====
Title	Writer	Artist	Colorist	Release date
X of Swords Handbook	Not applicable			October 14, 2020
X of Swords: Creation	Jonathan Hickman; Tini Howard	Pepe Larraz	Marte Gracia	September 23, 2020
X of Swords: Stasis	Jonathan Hickman; Tini Howard	Pepe Larraz; Mahmud Asrar	Marte Gracia	October 28, 2020
X of Swords: Destruction	Jonathan Hickman; Tini Howard	Pepe Larraz	Marte Gracia	November 25, 2020

==== Other ====
Title	Writer	Artist	Colorist	Release date
Free Comic Book Day: X-Men	Jonathan Hickman	Pepe Larraz	Marte Gracia	July 15, 2020

=== Release order ===
1. House of X #1
2. Powers of X #1
3. House of X #2
4. Powers of X #2
5. Powers of X #3
6. House of X #3
7. House of X #4
8. Powers of X #4
9. House of X #5
10. Powers of X #5
11. House of X #6
12. Powers of X #6
13. X-Men #1
14. Marauders #1
15. Excalibur #1
16. New Mutants #1
17. X-Force #1
18. Fallen Angels #1
19. X-Men #2
20. Excalibur #2
21. Marauders #2
22. New Mutants #2
23. X-Force #2
24. Fallen Angels #2
25. X-Men #3
26. Marauders #3
27. Excalibur #3
28. New Mutants #3
29. X-Force #3
30. Fallen Angels #3
31. Marauders #4
32. Excalibur #4
33. New Mutants #4
34. X-Force #4
35. Fallen Angels #4
36. X-Men #4
37. Marauders #5
38. Excalibur #5
39. New Mutants #5
40. X-Force #5
41. Fallen Angels #5
42. Marauders #6
43. Excalibur #6
44. X-Men #5
45. Fallen Angels #6
46. New Mutants #6
47. X-Force #6
48. Marauders #7
49. Excalibur #7
50. X-Force #7
51. X-Men #6
52. Marauders #8
53. New Mutants #7
54. Wolverine #1
55. Giant-Size X-Men: Jean Grey and Emma Frost #1
56. New Mutants #8
57. X-Force #8
58. X-Men #7
59. Excalibur #8
60. Marauders #9
61. Cable #1
62. New Mutants #9
63. X-Men #8
64. Excalibur #9
65. X-Force #9
66. Giant-Size X-Men: Nightcrawler #1
67. Hellions #1
68. Wolverine #2
69. X-Men #9
70. Marauders #10
71. Excalibur #10
72. New Mutants #10
73. X-Force #10
74. Free Comic Book Day: X-Men #1
75. Giant-Size X-Men: Magneto #1
76. New Mutants #11
77. Wolverine #3
78. Hellions #2
79. Empyre: X-Men #1
80. X-Factor #1
81. Cable #2
82. X-Men #10
83. Giant-Size X-Men: Fantomex #1
84. Empyre: X-Men #2
85. Empyre: X-Men #3
86. Marauders #11
87. X-Force #11
88. Empyre: X-Men #4
89. Excalibur #11
90. Wolverine #4
91. Cable #3
92. Hellions #3
93. X-Factor #2
94. X-Men #11
95. Cable #4
96. New Mutants #12
97. Wolverine #5
98. X-Force #12
99. X-Factor #3
100. Marauders #12
101. Hellions #4
102. Excalibur #12
103. Giant Size X-Men: Storm #1
104. X-Men #12
105. Juggernaut #1
106. X of Swords: Creation #1
107. X-Factor #4
108. Wolverine #6
109. X-Force #13
110. Marauders #13
111. Hellions #5
112. New Mutants #13
113. Cable #5
114. Excalibur #13
115. X-Men #13
116. X of Swords: Stasis #1
117. X-Men #14
118. Marauders #14
119. Marauders #15
120. Excalibur #14
121. Wolverine #7
122. X-Force #14
123. Hellions #6
124. Cable #6
125. X-Men #15
126. Excalibur #15
127. X of Swords: Destruction #1

== Premise ==
Mutants are offered asylum on the island of Krakoa, ruled by a council formed by Professor X, Magneto, and Apocalypse, among others. While several factions deal with their own issues, Moira MacTaggert warns them all about an incoming threat that may doom mutantkind and potentially the world.

=== Storylines ===
Title	Cast	Plot
X-Men	Full cast list here	The lead title and the primary 'anchor' of the initiative, described as a hub where all characters can freely enter and exit at any time. The lineup fluidly changes, with Cyclops being the primary constant.
Marauders	Full cast list here	Seafaring group of rescuers who free mutants that are being prevented from entering Krakoa by their nation's government.
Excalibur	Full cast list here	This series focuses more heavily on the mystical and fantastical side of the Marvel Universe, with a new kind of "mutant magic" being learned.
New Mutants	Full cast list here	This relaunch of the New Mutants sees the team taking a more science fiction direction, with part of the team going into deep space, as opposed to their traditional horror roots in previous runs.
X-Force	Full cast list here	The "Mutant C.I.A." branch of Krakoa, an intelligence agency and strike team meant to keep up with any and all possible threats to the nation and its people.
Fallen Angels	Full cast list here	The outsiders of Krakoa, who don't belong in paradise, due to their anti-heroic pasts.
Wolverine	Wolverine	Solo title focusing on James "Logan" Howlett, aka Wolverine, as he deals with being haunted by his old past in his new home.
Giant-Size X-Men	Varies	Collection of one-shots focusing on different characters. The five one-shots focus on Jean Grey, Emma Frost, Magneto, Nightcrawler, Fantomex, and Storm.
Cable	Kid Cable	First title focusing on the younger version of Cable, who is at the center of Krakoa's teenage revolution.
Hellions	Full cast list here	Mister Sinister's new team, dedicated to turning Krakoa's worst criminals into productive members of society.
X-Factor	Full cast list here	Investigation team dedicated to tracking deceased mutants in the world of murder and missing persons for The Five to resurrect.
X-Men/Fantastic Four	Fantastic Four, Franklin Richards, Professor X, Kate Pryde, Doctor Doom, X-Men	The X-Men of Krakoa and the Fantastic Four disagree over how to handle Franklin Richards's mutant identity while rescuing him from Doctor Doom.
Juggernaut	Juggernaut, D-Cel	Juggernaut, a former member of the X-Men, is not allowed on Krakoa as he is not a mutant. He teams up with new non-mutant hero D-Cel to find himself in the face of rejection.
X of Swords	Varies	Ten mutants will raise their swords when Krakoa faces a threat from the unknown.

=== Reading order ===
Issues marked in bold are marked as red/important in the issue list found in the back of each comic.

1. House of X #1
2. Powers of X #1
3. **House of X #2**
4. Powers of X #2
5. Powers of X #3
6. House of X #3
7. House of X #4
8. Powers of X #4
9. **House of X #5**
10. Powers of X #5
11. House of X #6
12. **Powers of X #6**
13. X-Men #1
14. Marauders #1
15. Excalibur #1
16. New Mutants #1–2, 5, 7
17. New Mutants #3–4, 6
18. X-Force #1
19. Fallen Angels #1–6
20. X-Men #2–3
21. Incoming! #1
22. Wolverine #1.A–3
23. Marauders #2–6
24. X-Force #2–3
25. Excalibur #2–6
26. X-Force #4–5
27. X-Men #4–6
28. X-Force #6
29. Marauders #7–10
30. X-Force #7–8
31. Giant-Size X-Men: Jean Grey and Emma Frost #1
32. Excalibur #7–8
33. New Mutants #8
34. Cable #1–4
35. Wolverine #4-5
36. New Mutants #9–12
37. X-Men #7–9
38. X-Force #9–10
39. Giant-Size X-Men: Nightcrawler #1
40. Hellions #1–4
41. Giant-Size X-Men: Magneto #1
42. Empyre: X-Men #1–4
43. X-Men #10–11
44. X-Factor #1–3
45. Giant-Size X-Men: Fantomex #1
46. Marauders #11–12
47. X-Force #11–12
48. Giant-Size X-Men: Storm #1
49. Excalibur #9–12
50. X-Men #12
51. **X of Swords: Creation #1**
52. X-Factor #4
53. Wolverine #6
54. X-Force #13
55. Marauders #13
56. Hellions #5
57. New Mutants #13
58. Cable #5
59. Excalibur #13
60. X-Men #13
61. X of Swords: Stasis #1
62. X-Men #14
63. Marauders #14–15
64. Excalibur #14
65. Wolverine #7
66. X-Force #14
67. Hellions #6
68. Cable #6
69. X-Men #15
70. Excalibur #15
71. X of Swords: Destruction #1

== Collected editions ==
Title	Material Collected	Format	Publication date	ISBN
House of X/Powers of X	House of X #1–6, Powers of X #1–6	Hardcover	November 2019	ISBN 978-1-302-91570-4
Dawn of X Volume 1	X-Men #1, Marauders #1, Excalibur #1, New Mutants #1, X-Force #1, Fallen Angels #1	Trade paperback	February 12, 2020	ISBN 978-1-302-92156-9
Dawn of X Volume 2	X-Men #2, Marauders #2, Excalibur #2, New Mutants #2, X-Force #2, Fallen Angels #2	Trade paperback	March 10, 2020	ISBN 978-1-302-92157-6
Dawn of X Volume 3	X-Men #3, Marauders #3, Excalibur #3, New Mutants #3, X-Force #3, Fallen Angels #3	Trade paperback	March 24, 2020	ISBN 978-1-302-92158-3
Dawn of X Volume 4	X-Men #4, Marauders #4, Excalibur #4, New Mutants #4, X-Force #4, Fallen Angels #4	Trade paperback	April 7, 2020	ISBN 978-1-302-92159-0
Dawn of X Volume 5	X-Men #5, Marauders #5, Excalibur #5, New Mutants #5, X-Force #5, Fallen Angels #5	Trade paperback	April 21, 2020	ISBN 978-1-302-92160-6
Dawn of X Volume 6	X-Men #6, Marauders #6, Excalibur #6, New Mutants #6, X-Force #6, Fallen Angels #6	Trade paperback	July 14, 2020	ISBN 978-1-302-92161-3
Dawn of X Volume 7	X-Men #7, Marauders #7, New Mutants #7, Excalibur #7–8, material from Wolverine #1	Trade paperback	September 1, 2020	ISBN 978-1-302-92760-8
Dawn of X Volume 8	Marauders #8, Wolverine #2–3, X-Force #7–8, Giant Size X-Men: Jean Grey and Emma Frost #1	Trade paperback	October 20, 2020	ISBN 978-1-302-92761-5
Dawn of X Volume 9	New Mutants #8, Marauders #9, Cable #1, X-Men #8–9, X-Force #9	Trade paperback	November 10, 2020	ISBN 978-1-302-92766-0
Dawn of X Volume 10	X-Force #10, Excalibur #9, Giant Size X-Men: Nightcrawler #1, Hellions #1, New Mutants #9	Trade paperback	December 1, 2020	ISBN 978-1-302-92767-7
Dawn of X Volume 11	Excalibur #10, New Mutants #10–11, Hellions #2–3, material from Wolverine #1	Trade paperback	February 2, 2021	ISBN 978-1-302-92768-4
Dawn of X Volume 12	Hellions #4, Marauders #10, X-Factor #1, Giant-Size X-Men: Magneto #1, Cable #2	Trade paperback	February 16, 2021	ISBN 978-1-302-92769-1
Dawn of X Volume 13	Cable #3–4, X-Men #10, Empyre: X-Men #1–2	Trade paperback	March 2, 2021	ISBN 978-1-302-92770-7
Dawn of X Volume 14	Empyre: X-Men #3–4, X-Men #11, Wolverine #4, X-Factor #2	Trade paperback	March 30, 2021	ISBN 978-1-302-92771-4
Dawn of X Volume 15	Marauders #11–12, X-Factor #3, Wolverine #5, New Mutants #12, Giant-Size X-Men: Fantomex	Trade paperback	May 4, 2021	ISBN 978-1-302-92772-1
Dawn of X Volume 16	Giant-Size X-Men: Storm #1, X-Force #11–12, Excalibur #11–12	Trade paperback	June 8, 2021	ISBN 978-1-302-92773-8
X of Swords	X-Men #12, X of Swords: Creation #1, X-Factor #4, Wolverine #6, X-Force #13, Marauders #13, Hellions #5, New Mutants #13, Cable #5, Excalibur #13, X-Men #13, X of Swords: Stasis #1, X-Men #14, Marauders #14–15, Excalibur #14, Wolverine #7, X-Force #14, Hellions #6, Cable #6, X-Men #15, Excalibur #15, X of Swords: Destruction #1	Hardcover	March 16, 2021	ISBN 978-1-302-92717-2
Juggernaut	Juggernaut #1–5 (Even though this series is not part of Dawn of X, it happens during the Dawn of X period)	Paperback	March 23, 2021	ISBN 978-1-302-92450-8

== Related material ==
- Marvel Comics #1000
  - Written by Al Ewing et al., drawn by various artists.
  - A brief glimpse at major events throughout Marvel's 80 years of publishing.
  - Includes a short one-page story written by Hickman about Apocalypse and the Four Horsemen.
- Incoming! #1
  - An 80-page State-of-the-Union of Marvel Comics, staged around a murder mystery that would tease the Marvel event Empyre.
  - Includes a short story written by Hickman about Mr. Sinister, teasing X-Men/Fantastic Four.
- Gwenpool Strikes Back #5
  - Written by Leah Williams and drawn by David Baldeon.
  - Gwenpool goes to Krakoa, encountering Wolverine and Quentin Quire.
- Weapon Plus: World War IV #1
  - Written by Benjamin Percy, illustrated by Georges Jeanty
  - Involves elements touched on in X-Force #6, as well as the Weapon X program.
  - Backup story titled Brute Force directly references Orchis.
- Black Cat #9–10
  - Written by Jed MacKay, Drawn by Kris Anka.
  - Not crucial to the entirety of Dawn of X, but Black Cat teams up with Wolverine, and Krakoa is briefly mentioned.
- Deadpool #6
  - Written by Kelly Thompson, Drawn by Kevin Libranda.
  - Deadpool visits Krakoa.
- Runaways #34-35
  - Written by Rainbow Rowell, Drawn by Andrés Genolet.
  - Now that Krakoa is open to all mutants, will Molly abandon her friends and join her new family?
  - Features Wolverine and Pixie.
- Fantastic Four #26
  - Written by Dan Slott, Drawn by R.B. Silva
  - Professor X reveals to Franklin Richards that Franklin is not a mutant and is therefore unwelcome in Krakoa.
