= Ed Brisson =

Canadian comic book writer

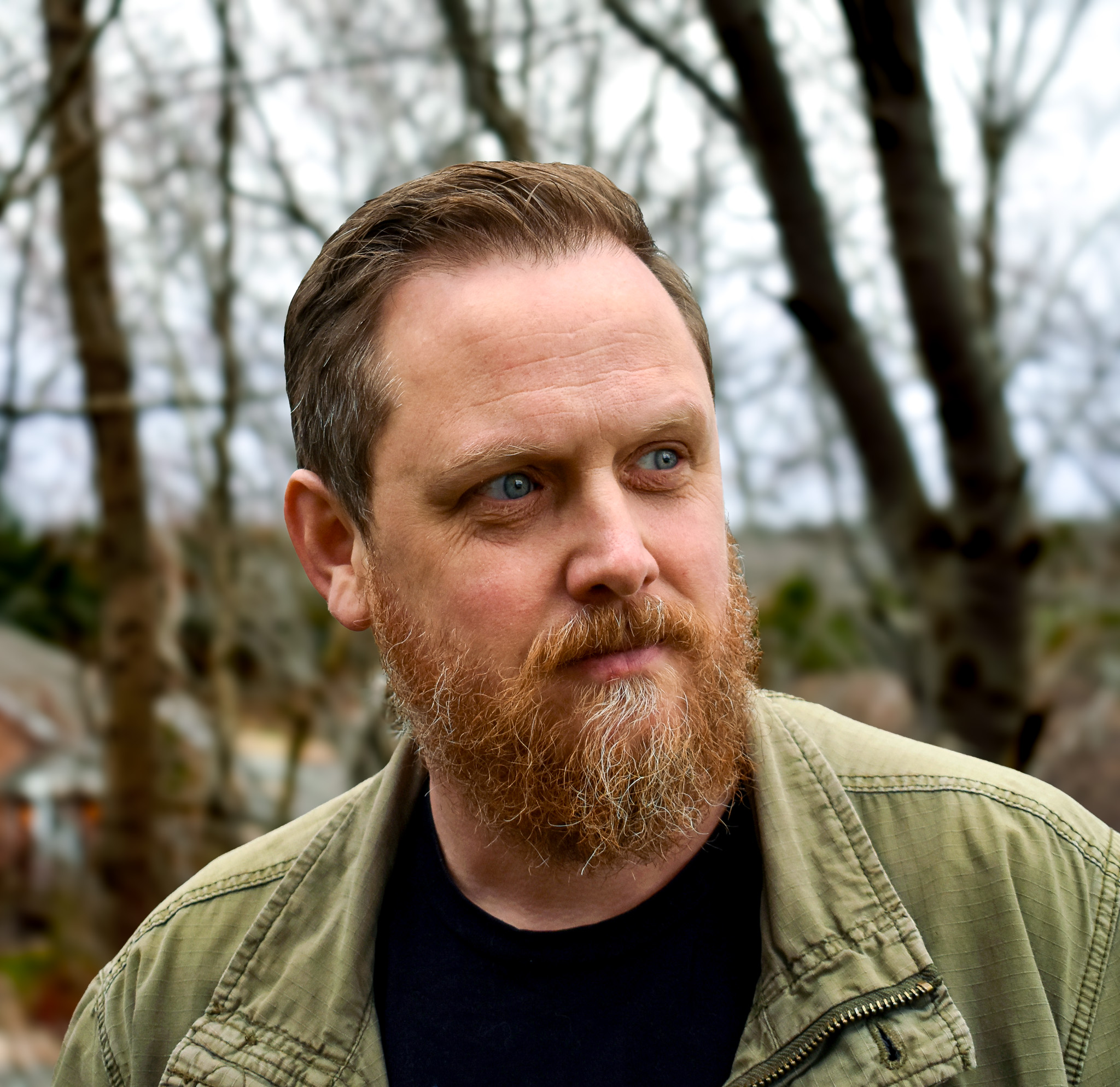
- Areas: Writer, Letterer
- Notable works: Murder Book, Comeback, The Violent, New Mutants, Alpha Flight, Batman Incorporated, Predator: Day of the Hunter, Predator: The Preserve, Predator: The Last Hunt.

Ed Brisson is a Canadian comics writer and letterer who has written for independent comics, Marvel Comics, and DC Comics. He has been nominated for the Joe Shuster Award for Best Canadian Writer several times.

== Career ==
Brisson has been making comics for over twenty years. He began writing, drawing, coloring, and lettering his own work and selling them through records shops before focusing on writing and self-publishing Murder Book, a series of crime comics, in 2010, with the first two stories illustrated by Simon Roy. From there, he wrote the one-shot Black River and then Comeback and Sheltered at Image Comics. He collaborated with Roy again for The Field in 2014 and go on to write The Mantle and The Violent in 2015.

Brisson started working with Marvel Comics in 2013, writing two issues of Secret Avengers in 2013 before being tapped to write a five-issue Bullseye mini-series in 2016 and a new Iron Fist series in 2017. He then took over the ongoing Old Man Logan series at issue 25 writing until issue 50 and then concluding with a 12-issue mini-series Dead Man Logan. In 2018, he wrote Extermination, a mini-series dealing with the time-displaced original five X-Men. He also became the writer, alongside Matthew Rosenberg and Kelly Thompson, of the new volume of Uncanny X-Men, co-writing the book until issue 10, and then writing a new volume of X-Force and Age of X-Man: Nextgen.

In 2019, he wrote the limited series Contagion and the ongoing series Ghost Rider which was canceled due to the COVID-19 pandemic. He also collaborated with Jonathan Hickman in writing New Mutants for the Dawn of X. In 2021, he wrote Beyond the Breach for AfterShock Comics, a science fiction story about the aftermath of a cataclysm. In 2022, his Predator comic with artist Kev Walker was released, a project initially planned for 2020 but delayed. After six issues, the book was relaunched in 2023 and a third book, Predator: The Last Hunt, was published in 2024. He also wrote the five issue Alpha Flight mini-series for the Fall of X.

At DC Comics, Brisson took over as writer for Deathstroke Inc. at issue 10 and became the writer for the 2022 relaunch of Batman Incorporated. In 2023, he wrote the crime/horror comic Sins of the Salton Sea for AWA Studios and in 2024, he published The Displaced through Boom! Studios. In November 2024, he was announced as the writing for the upcoming SilverHawks comic from Dynamite.

== Personal life ==
He grew up in Oshawa, Ontario. He currently lives in Halifax, Nova Scotia with his wife and daughter. He operated the comics publishing company New Reliable Press until 2010.

== Bibliography ==
=== Marvel Comics ===
- Avengers of the Wastelands #1-5 (2020)
- Bullseye #1-5 (2017)
- Contagion #1-5 (2019)
- Deadpool: Black, White & Blood #1, short story "Hotline to Heaven" (2021)
- Ghost Rider:
  - Ghost Rider vol. 9 #1-7 (2019–2020)
  - Ghost Rider 2099 vol. 2 #1 (2019)
  - Spirits of Ghost Rider: Mother of Demons #1 (2020)
  - King in Black: Ghost Rider #1 (2021)
- Incoming #1 (2019)
- Iron Fist vol. 5 #1-7, vol. 1 #73-80 (2017–2018)
- Marvel Comics #1000, short story "The Big Bounce" (2019)
- Marvel Comics Presents vol. 3 #6, short story "Fadeaway" (2019)
- Predator:
  - Predator #1-6 (Day of the Hunter; 2022–2023)
  - Predator vol. 2 #1-5 (The Preserve; 2023)
  - Predator: The Last Hunt #1-4 (2024)
- Secret Avengers #10-11 (2013)
- Secret Wars: Battleworld #1, short story "M.O.D.O.K. Madness" (2015)
- Spider-Man:
  - Absolute Carnage: Symbiote of Vengeance #1 (2019)
  - Amazing Spider-Man vol. 5 #68-69 (2021)
  - Giant-Size Amazing Spider-Man: Chameleon Conspiracy #1 (2021)
  - Carnage: Black, White & Blood #4, short story "The End of Humanity" (2021)
  - Sinister War #2-4 (2021)
- X-Men:
  - Old Man Logan vol. 2 #25-50, Annual (2017–2018)
  - Dead Man Logan #1-12 (2018–2019)
  - Cable vol. 1 #150-154 (2017–2018)
  - X-Men: Gold vol. 2 #27, X-Men: Blue #27, X-Men: Red #5, Astonishing X-Men vol. 4 #13, Cable #159, backup "Countdown to Extermination" (2018)"
  - Extermination #1-5 (2018)
  - Uncanny X-Men vol. 5 #1-10, Annual (2018-2019)
  - Merry X-Mas Holiday Special #1, short story "Deck the Halls" (2018)
  - X-Force vol. 5 #1-10 (2018–2019)
  - Age of X-Man: Nextgen #1-5 (2019)
  - Alpha Flight: True North #1, short story "Illegal Guardians" (2019)
  - New Mutants vol. 4 #1, 3–4, 6, 8-13 (2019–2020)
  - Empyre: X-Men #3 (2020)
  - Wolverine: Black, White, & Blood #4, short story "Reave What You Sow" (2021)
  - Heroes Reborn: Weapon X & Final Flight #1 (2021)
  - Alpha Flight vol. 5 #1-5 (2023)

=== DC Comics ===
- Are You Afraid of Darkseid? #1, short story "The Ogopogo" (2021)
- Batman:
  - Batman & Robin Eternal #11-12, 17-18 (2015–2016)
  - Batman 2022 Annual vol. 3 #1 (2022)
  - Batman Incorporated vol. 3 #1-12 (2022–2023)
  - Batman Secret Files: Clownhunter #1 (2021)
  - Batman Sceret Files: Peacekeeper-01 #1 (2021)
  - Batman: The Brave and the Bold #1-6, "Stormwatch" six-part story (2023)
  - Shadow War Zone #1, short story "Panic Room" (2022)
- Deathstroke Inc. #10-15 (2022)
- Knight Terrors: Ravager #1-2 (2023)
- Wildstorm 30th Anniversary Special #1, short story "Building a Better Bomb" (2022)

=== Other Comics ===
==== AfterShock Comics ====
- Beyond the Breach #1-5 (2021)

==== AWA Studios ====
- Sins of the Salton Sea #1-5 (2023)

==== Boom! Studios ====
- Cluster #1-8 (2015)
- The Displaced #1-5 (2024)
- The Last Contract #1-4 (2016)

==== Dark Horse ====
- Dark Horse Presents #5-8, "Murder Book" short stories (2014–2015)
- Murder Book (2010), originally self-published

==== Dynamite Entertainment ====
- ThunderCats: Apex #1 (2024)

==== IDW Comics ====
- 24: Underground #1-5 (2014)

==== Image Comics ====
- Comeback #1-5 (2012–2013)
- Creepshow #5 (2025)
- Dia de los Muetros #2, short story "The Skinny One" (2013)
- The Field #1-4 (2014)
- The Mantle #1-5 (2015)
- Sheltered #1-15 (2013–2015)
- The Silver Coin #3 (2021)
- The Violent #1-5 (2015–2016)
