= X-Factor (2020 comic book) =

2020 American superhero comic book written by Leah Williams

- Cover to X-Factor (vol. 4) #1 by David Baldeón.

Publication information
- Publisher: Marvel Comics
- Schedule: Monthly
- Format: Ongoing series
- Genre: Superhero
- Publication date: July 2020 – June 2021
- No. of issues: 10
- Main characters: Northstar; Polaris; Rachel Summers; Prodigy; Daken; Eye-Boy

Creative team
- Written by: Leah Williams

X-Factor is an American superhero comic book written by Leah Williams and published by Marvel Comics. The title was launched in July 2020 as part of Dawn of X, a relaunch of Marvel's X-Men related titles.

The series focuses on the titular X-Factor team—led by Northstar, and consisting of Polaris, Rachel Summers, Prodigy, Daken, and Eye-Boy—as they investigate the disappearances of mutants and confirm whether they are dead or not so they can be resurrected.

X-Factor received positive reviews from critics, however, the book was cancelled with #10.

== Plot ==
Upon feeling the death of his twin sister, Northstar flies to the mutant island Krakoa and demands she be resurrected. Lacking proof of death and not wanting a duplicate of a mutant existing alongside the original, the Five ask Northstar to prove Aurora's death. To do this, Northstar forms a new X-Factor team alongside Polaris' help, being also aided by Rachel Summers, Daken, David Alleyne, and Eye-Boy. Finding Aurora's body and proof of death, albeit under mysterious circumstances, the Five resurrects her. Following her revival, X-Factor and the Five agree to work with each other, as the latter is overburdened with requests to resurrect mutants. X-Factor agrees to help investigate reports of missing mutants, and Northstar is chosen to lead the team.

== Publication and development ==
X-Factor was first announced by Marvel in January 2020, to be written by Leah Williams and start publication in April. The initial core cast was announced to consist of Jean-Paul Beaubier / Northstar, Lorna Dane / Polaris, Rachel Grey / Prestige, Akihiro / Daken, David Alleyne / Prodigy, and Trevor Hawkins / Eye-Boy. In February, it was revealed that Northstar's twin sister Jeanne-Marie / Aurora would also be joining the team. In March, Marvel released a trailer to promote the title.

Williams informed Bleeding Cool that the X-Factor series was canceled when her Magneto/Wanda story arc pitch for X-Factor "became such a popular pitch at Marvel", however, Marvel didn't believe that X-Factor's readership numbers were "big enough for this story" which led to the development of the Trial of Magneto limited series. Marvel "canceled X-Factor #10 rather than seeing it run as planned, with the Trial beginning in X-Factor #15. Williams says she only learned about the cancellation of X-Factor when she was writing #9, so as she had to finish the series quickly, squeezing six issues worth of story into those last two issues, calling it 'cramped and rushed'". Williams also stated that she "had to change her goodbye letter at the end of X-Factor #10 three times, because she was giving away too much of what the previous plans had been and Marvel didn't want to make the cancellation look like the last-minute decision it clearly was, and that this was planned all along".

=== Characters ===
In the comic, the X-Factor team reports to the Five; a group of five mutants who combine their powers to resurrect dead mutants. According to Williams, the comic was initially "pitched as a missing persons mystery book", but decided to place more emphasis on the Five and the resurrection process after noticing fan interest in the subject. She worked with X-Men writer Jonathan Hickman and editor Jordan D. White to establish the cast of the series.

Northstar was chosen because Williams had become attached to the character while writing the Age of X-Man: X-Tremists miniseries. Moreover, Northstar's marriage to his human husband Kyle would allow her to depict a mutant–human relationship. The decision to include Polaris in the cast was hard for Williams, as she was unfamiliar with the character. However, she included her on the team because of her history with being a member of X-Factor and having "character work that desperately needs doing".

The remaining members of the team were all chosen based on their investigative skills and capability. Rachel due to her telepathy and "incredible lore and untapped potential", having chosen Prodigy for similar reasons. Eye-Boy was chosen because of his x-ray vision and acting as the team's youngest member, while Daken's inclusion was because Williams felt the team needed a "fucky thot enforcer".

Williams stated that Aurora was initially supposed to only assist the team from their headquarters as—similarly to Polaris—she viewed the character as one that required independent work "without Northstar overshadowing her".

== Reception ==
At the review aggregator website Comic Book Roundup, the series received an average score of 8.1 out of 10 based on 58 reviews. Even before the title's start, Scoot Allan of Comic Book Resources listed the roster as his 7th favorite X-Factor roster, stating that its use of established characters and inclusion of former members "has the potential to be an exciting and powerful roster".

The series received a nomination for Outstanding Comic Book at the 32nd GLAAD Media Awards in 2021.

Ryan Sonneville, reviewing Reign of X Vol. 14 for AIPT Comics, called X-Factor #10 – the final issue of X-Factor – a "jumbled mess". Sonneville highlighted that the Trial of Magento was originally intended as a story-arc following X-Factor #15, however, the sudden cancellation of X-Factor "meant every loose plot element emerging had to come to an abrupt conclusion. The mystery of Prodigy's murder is 'revealed,' but comes across as an arc that skipped huge chunks of its rising action. The fact that it is also a tie-in to the larger Hellfire Gala crossover and stage setting for the Trial of Magneto does not help; it reads like jumbled mess of editorial incongruities. Pencil work is covered by three separate artists, which does not help its narrative direction or tone, even though each individual contribution is competent. It's a shame that this book, with such a distinct identity and style, was so quickly brought to an unsatisfying conclusion".
