= Paul Mounts =

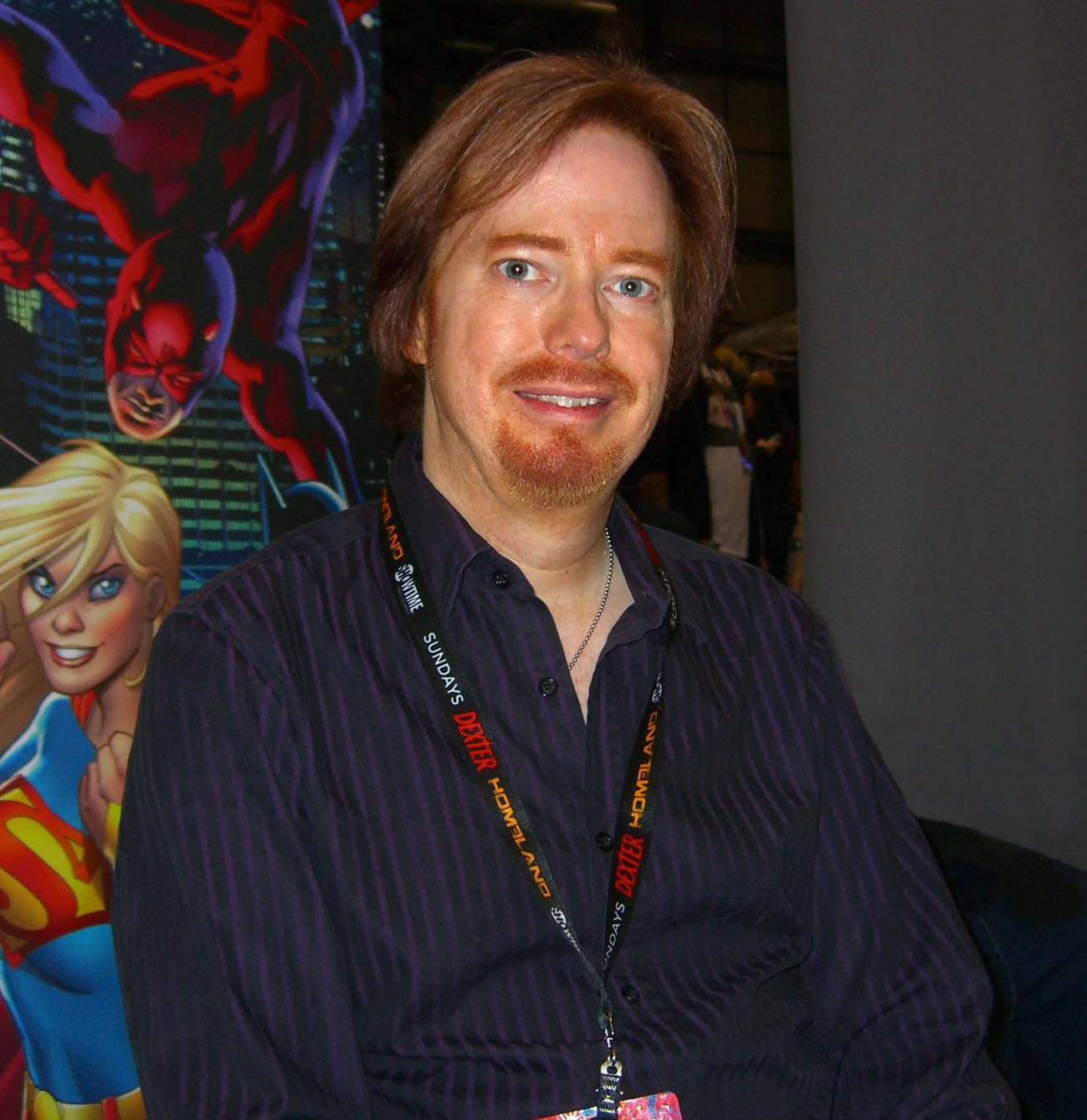
- Mounts at the 2011 New York Comic Con
- Area: Colourist

Paul Mounts is an artist who has worked as a colorist in the comics industry, on comics including Fantastic Four, Friendly Neighborhood Spider-Man, Ultimates, and Reborn.

== Career ==
Mounts often colors the artwork of collaborator Amanda Conner, who feels that Mounts is a compatible colorist for her work, as he achieves "the right amount of bounciness or moodiness, depending on what's needed."

Mounts' art was featured in "The Perspiration Implementation", the October 19, 2015 episode of the American sitcom The Big Bang Theory. In the episode, comic book store owner Stuart Bloom asks the women for ideas on how to attract more women to his shop, and Amy Farrah Fowler (Mayim Bialik) points out that an illustration hanging on one of the shop's walls, "Girl on a Leash", may not be conducive to attracting female customers. The image, which was illustrated by Amanda Conner and colored by Mounts, depicts a scantily clad woman being held on a chain leash by a muscular whip-wielding masked man.
