= Batman: Night of the Owls =

2012 Batman comic book crossover storyline

- Batman: Night of the Owls Booklet. Cover art by David Finch, Richard Friend and Jerome Cox.
- Publisher: DC Comics
- Publication date: April–May 2012
- Genre: Superhero
Title(s)
All-Star Western #9
Batgirl #9
Batman #1-12
Batman Annual #1
Batman: The Dark Knight #9
Batman and Robin #9
Batwing #9
Birds of Prey #9
Catwoman #9
Detective Comics #9
Nightwing #1-9
Red Hood and the Outlaws #9
- Main character(s): Batman; Nightwing; Alfred Pennyworth; Bat-Family; Court of Owls

Creative team
- Writer(s): Tony Daniel (Detective Comics); Kyle Higgins (Nightwing); Scott Lobdell (Red Hood and the Outlaws); Jimmy Palmiotti and Justin Gray (All-Star Western); Gail Simone (Batgirl); Scott Snyder (Batman and Batman Annual, showrunner); Duane Swierczynski (Birds of Prey); Peter Tomasi (Batman and Robin); James Tynion IV (Batman Annual); Judd Winick (Batman: The Dark Knight, Batwing, and Catwoman)
- Artist(s): Rafael Albuquerque (Batman backup feature); Eddy Barrows (Nightwing); Greg Capullo (Batman); Tony Daniel (Detective Comics); Jason Fabok (Batman Annual); David Finch (Batman: The Dark Knight); Travel Foreman (Birds of Prey); Lee Garbett (Batman and Robin); Moritat (All-Star Western); Kenneth Rocafort (Red Hood and the Outlaws); Ardian Syaf (Batgirl); Marcus To (Catwoman)
- Batman: Night of the Owls: ISBN 1401237738

"Batman: Night of the Owls" is a comic book crossover storyline published by the comic book publishing company DC Comics in mid-2012, and featuring the Batman family of characters. Primarily written by Scott Snyder, the arc is the first major crossover storyline of The New 52.

The story pits the Batman and his allies against the Court of Owls organization as they attempt to cement their control over Gotham City, which they have been manipulating in secret for centuries. As described by Nightwing writer Kyle Higgins, the series is the follow-up to Batman: Gates of Gotham and divulges more of the history of the city before the turn of the century. The crossover has been described by writer Scott Snyder as the first story arc of a Batman trilogy that he was planning. According to Snyder, in terms of internal chronology, the story arc takes place in a single night within his full Batman arc "The Court of Owls".

== Plot summary ==
The story arc stretches across various comic books, each building the story for the Batman: Night of the Owls by following different Gotham characters as they deal with the onslaught of the Court of Owls. Upon hearing a distress call from Alfred, all the members of the "Bat Family" race to various targets in an attempt to save them from the Court's assassins, the Talons.

In Batman, the Talons descend upon Wayne Manor and infiltrate the Batcave, causing Bruce to defend his home and his base from the intruders before heading into the Court's siege on Gotham. In Detective Comics, Batman quickly makes his way to Arkham Asylum after defending his home to stop the Court from assassinating Jeremiah Arkham. The Nightwing tie-in issues follow Dick Grayson's encounter with the Talons of the Court, and has more meaning since Dick was being groomed as a child to become a Talon himself while a member of Haley's Circus. In the Batman and Robin tie-in issue, Robin is tasked with confronting Talons threatening a high-ranking military General targeted for death by the Court.

In Batgirl, Barbara is racing to stop one of the Court's Talons from killing her father, Commissioner Gordon, due to his place in the power structure of Gotham that the Court is attempting to dismantle.

To conclude the Batman: Night of the Owls crossover, Batman Annual #1 delved into The New 52 backstory of Mr. Freeze, which now has a tie to the Court.

=== Backstory ===
The main backstory of the crossover comes from the 1880s during the period of the Wild West. After building the old Wayne Tower, Alan Wayne removes the thirteenth floor; in its stead, he merges the twelfth and fourteenth floors together due to his superstitions.

Amadeus Arkham and Jonah Hex meet up with each other in Gotham City to investigate crimes committed by the Religion of Crime. Not long after solving the mystery, the duo end up on the case of missing children that eventually have Hex and Arkham arriving in the Batcave. In the Batcave, they are met by the hostile last remnants of the Miagani, the Native American tribe endemic to the Gotham region, but are permitted to leave into Wayne Manor after killing a giant prehistoric bat. Arriving outside Wayne Manor, the two are met by Alan Wayne who decides to help the two track down the leader behind the missing children. Soon after, Hex is met by a female Talon who kills Moody, somebody declared a liability by the Court of Owls. Hex notes the Talon as being an acrobat and reminisces about a wife he had who was an acrobat. The Court of Owls decides to wage war against the Crime Bible and decide to manipulate Hex into fighting their war for them.

Alan, and his friends Edward Elliot, Theodore Cobblepot, and Burton Crowne later observe a street performer whose father died during the construction of the Kane Bridge. The street performer, however, is not a child of Gotham and manages to stop a pickpocket who is doing his dirty business during the performance. The man getting robbed takes the boy in to Haley's Circus. At Haley's, the boy becomes a talented knife-thrower, but eventually returns to Gotham a hero and falls in love with Amelia Crowne. Burton disapproves of the two's relationship, though, and when Amelia is found to be pregnant, William is rebuffed. Feeling outcast, he believed himself to be "gray"—his allusion to the boundary between the rich and the poor in Gotham society ("white" as rich, "black" as poor). When Nathaniel Haley offers him to be a member of the Court, William accepts and within months becomes the greatest Talon to have ever lived. William steals back his son and entrusts him to Nathaniel, asking him to raise the boy as the "Gray Son of Gotham"; giving the boy the surname, Grayson.

In the early 1920s an insane Alan Wayne, believing himself to be chased by the Talon of the '20s, ends up in the sewers, where he is attacked and tortured. As he did not put up a great fight, the Talon puts up Alan's picture and disposes of his corpse, which is found later. Around fifty-five years later, Jarvis Pennyworth is writing to his son, Alfred, to tell him not to come to serve the Wayne family. Jarvis is rushing into his car to try and escape Wayne Manor, blaming the downfall of the Waynes on Martha Wayne and himself, but is discovered by a Talon and is killed. Ten years later, a young Bruce Wayne, thinking them to be an omen sent by the Court, murders a nest of owls in his manor rooftop, believing the Court of Owls to have hired Joe Chill to murder his parents. Alton Carver is put through the final test by the ringmaster of Haley's Circus, to escape a burning fire, which Alton manages to do, though he is badly burned. Sometime after, Alton assumes the role of a Talon.

Sometime after Bruce has donned the mantle of Batman, Alton, a Talon who held the mantle longer than the rest, is getting sloppier in his work. Alton is told by the Court that he will be retired. Scared, Alton rushes off to see who is to replace him. He discovers that it is Richard Grayson/Nightwing, the heir of William Cobb. Soon after, Alton is put on his final test, but is stopped by Batman, who had investigated the existence of the Court as a child but never found any evidence to support his theory.

=== "The Court of Owls" ===
Nightwing and Batman investigate an outbreak in Arkham Asylum, leading to Batman investigating about a man who warned Nightwing of the Court of Owls. As Dick Grayson is attacked by Saiko, a mysterious man with "head to toe body armor and bladed weapons". Saiko confuses Grayson by calling him Gotham's most notorious killer. Grayson is able to slip into his costume when the police distract Saiko and begins to fight, eventually defeating him. Mr. Haley, who had figured out Nightwing's secret identity years earlier, tells Saiko while being tortured and mortally wounded, leaving Haley's Circus for Grayson to inherit. Raya, Grayson's former childhood friend and member of Haley's Circus, becomes a romantic interest for a short time.

During a meeting with Lincoln March, a candidate for mayor, Bruce is attacked by an assassin dressed like the Talon. While Bruce manages to defeat him, he realizes the difficulty this opponent will bring after the Talon drops 30 stories from Wayne tower and wakes up to kill his ride to the morgue. Bruce notes that the assassin was dressed as the Talon, a mythical figure from an old nursery rhyme about Gotham called the Court of Owls.

Nightwing, having taken over Haley's Circus, drives to Chicago and Miami, where he uses Mr. Haley's dying words to find a mysterious Black Book of Names, of which he recognizes none except his own.

While investigating the attack by the Talon, Batman finds an "owl's nest" at the Old Wayne Tower, hidden between the 12th and 14th floors. Before he can further investigate, he sets off a trip wire, destroying the base. Batman then looks further into his family's history, researching the death of his great-grandfather, Alan Wayne, who had become obsessed with owls towards the end of his life. After finding many more owl's nests hidden in buildings built by a trust established by Alan Wayne, he analyzes Alan's bones, finding that his death was not accidental as previously believed, and clues that lead him into the sewer, where he is ambushed by the Talon and set loose in a huge underground maze.

While Nightwing fights the demon Zohna in New Orleans, his girlfriend Raya meets up with Saiko. Saiko reveals that he knows about the Black Book of Names and sleeps with Raya, revealing himself to be none other than Nightwing's childhood friend, Raymond. Nightwing grows confused as to why Saiko has not attacked him and investigates the case, using his skills learned from his tenure as Batman. With Bruce still missing, Nightwing learns of a Flying Grayson's Memorial Show planned in Gotham. Saiko reveals to Raya that he plans on killing Grayson at the memorial show. At the show, Nightwing confronts Saiko who, to Grayson's shock, reveals himself as Raymond. Because before Bruce took him in, Grayson was supposed to be the next Talon, in turn, Raymond blames him for the torture that he received. During the fight, Saiko triggers explosions around the circus.

For eight days, Cobb tortures Batman in a maze that contains portraits of Gotham in the Wild West that also details Gotham's history. As Batman begins to solve the mystery that is presented to him, he realizes the Court is trying to undermine him and his presence in Gotham by "breaking him". Batman comes to a room of caskets, but does not open them, wishing to solve the rest of the mystery first and is attacked and impaled by Cobb. Cobb reveals that as Batman was such a worthy foe, the Court will hang his bones in the maze, an honor that only three before him have received. Cobb takes Batman to a room full of members of the Court of Owls who decide on what they shall do with Batman. They allow the youngest member to choose Batman's fate, a young girl who says that she wants Cobb to "hurt him more".

Cobb begins to mercilessly beat Batman to the point that he wishes for death; members of the Court then begin to swarm Batman's body to collect trophies. However, refusing defeat, he revives, surprising the Court and comes after Cobb with every thing he has left. Batman is then able to defeat Cobb in battle and virtually kills him, stopping at the last moment. Using his detective skills, knowledge of Gotham, explosives, and construction, he is able to escape. He does this by building an improvised explosive from chemicals he obtained from the Court's old style camera and blows a hole through some "softer" marble to escape into Gotham's underground river. After seeing the brutality of Batman, and realizing the hold he has on the city, the Court of Owls decide to awaken all of their Talons.

As Nightwing battles Saiko, he reveals to Nightwing that due to his adoption by Bruce Wayne, Saiko was taken in by the Court of Owls instead of Nightwing. After a battle with Saiko, the villain drops to his death and Nightwing feels responsible. Nightwing returns to the Batcave where Bruce is studying the body of William Cobb, recovered by Alfred. Bruce reveals that due to an agent in the Talon's blood, they can revive themselves, which Cobb cannot do because of a cooling agent Bruce is pumping into Cobb's blood. Bruce then reveals to Nightwing that Cobb is actually Nightwing's great-grandfather and that Nightwing was destined to be a Talon, a goal stopped by his adoption.

=== "Night of the Owls" ===
Scouting out the Penguin's base, Selina Kyle and her lover Spark decide to commit espionage against the gang boss. The Court of Owls, angered at Cobb's defeat at the hands of Batman, awaken all of their other Talons to reclaim Gotham City. They also dispose of Cobb's body for Alfred Pennyworth to find. The Court's goal is to prove that they are the superior legend of Gotham, not Batman. The Owls first attack the Batcave, but the injured Bruce still manages to defeat several of them due to their outdated fighting style. Alfred uncovers the forty targets of the Owls and sends a radio message out to the Batman Family for help. Tim Drake and Jason Todd receive one and decide to protect Mr. Freeze. Bruce dons an armored Batman suit to be able to fight all of the Owls while one of the Owls revives William Cobb.

The Birds of Prey are one of the first to fight a Talon who is merciless and cruel in his methods, wanting to kill "street vermin". Nightwing receives the message and goes to save Mayor Sebastian Hady. Nightwing has no problem in killing the Talon attacking Hady due to it already being dead, but upon stopping it is knifed in the chest by a revived Cobb, who credits Nightwing, his descendant, working for Batman as his worst betrayal. When Selina and Spark arrive to steal from the Penguin, they see the Penguin's car leaving, but are not aware that the Penguin himself is still alive and being viciously beat down by Ephraim Newman, a Talon. Bruce, meanwhile, continues to fight the Talons invading the Batcave and eventually manages to stop them, and he heads out to save Jeremiah Arkham who is fighting the Talons through Roman Sionis, a.k.a. Black Mask. Nightwing is brutally beat down by Cobb who continues to mock him; Cobb demands that his heir impress him, eventually giving up and calling Nightwing a waste. Nightwing, however, retaliates and electrocutes Cobb, then offers to take Jeremiah Arkham from Batman.

Selina and Spark check the fight out and while Spark wishes to back out, Selina jumps into the fight. After giving Arkham to Nightwing, Batman goes to save Lincoln March. Bruce combats Alton Carver, the Talon sent to kill March, but is unable to stop Carver from killing March, a mayoral candidate who wanted to make Gotham a better place. March gives Batman a package that will make Gotham better and Bruce heads out to burn down the lair of the Court of Owls. Damian heads off to the outskirts of Gotham and kills a Talon who was seeking to kill an army general and Batwing proceeds to mutilate a Talon who wanted to assassinate Lucius Fox.

Batgirl proceeds to meet a Talon named Mary, who when she sees Batgirl simply strokes her across the face. Batgirl swipes a piece of paper from Mary. Balloon bombs set off by the Court of Owls also begin to go off at random spots. Batgirl then pushes Mary into a balloon bomb, killing her. However, Mary's healing factor keeps her barely alive, and Batgirl keeps her tied up to the Batsignal, which at that point had been sabotaged to display a massive owl. Batgirl then switches the owl with the original bat. The Outlaws capture Mr. Freeze and Red Hood ends up having a "heart to heart" with a Talon, who eventually decides that he wants to be in control of the second time he is killed, and so begs Red Hood to execute him. The battle against the Owls begins to go the way of the Gotham citizens. Alton then awakens, believing himself to finally be free from fear and all that has bound him. Freeze escapes and tries to kill Bruce Wayne, but once again ends up being stopped twice in one day.

Selina and Spark initially think themselves to have killed the Talon, but later realize that the Talon is, in a way, immortal. Ephraim takes Selina's whip and begins to mercilessly beat Spark and then choke Selina's lover with it with Selina not understanding. Selina decides to bargain with the Talon, offering him a full set of Talon daggers. Ephraim begins to listen but is shot in the head by the Penguin. Selina and Spark eventually decide not on stealing the Talon daggers that Penguin originally had in his possession and head off to deposit the Talon's body, which they leave at the Bat-Signal, with the Night of the Owls having come to a close.

=== Fallout ===
Following the battle, Bruce tracks down the leadership of the grouping of the Court of Owls in Gotham City to the Powers family. However, when he finds the Court, they are all dead by poison. The next day, confused whether the Court killed his parents, he deduces the man behind the Court's death. Confronting the now-undead mayoral candidate Lincoln March, he learns that he used Mr. Freeze's Talon serum to survive, and was a member of the Court all along. Lincoln March equips a power armor created for a new generation of Talons to compete with Batman and reveals that he believes himself to be Thomas Wayne Jr. Knowing Batman's identity, he accuses Bruce with responsibility for the deaths of Thomas and Martha Wayne. The two very quickly engage in combat, which March dubs "Owl to Bat". After a lengthy brawl through the skies of Gotham, March is trapped in an explosion intended to kill Bruce. Later, no body is located. Bruce admits to Dick that although he is skeptical of March's claims and believes his parents would have told him that he had a brother, without March's body and a DNA test he is unable to conclusively prove or disprove March's claims.

== Titles ==
The following titles are part of the crossover. Detective Comics was originally not part of the crossover, but was ultimately included.

=== Tie-ins ===
- Batman vol. 2 #1-12
- Nightwing vol. 3 #1-7

=== "Night of the Owls" crossover ===
- All-Star Western vol. 3 #9
- Batgirl vol. 4 #9
- Batman vol. 2 #8-9 and Annual #1
- Batman and Robin vol. 2 #9
- Batman: The Dark Knight vol. 2 #9
- Batwing #9
- Birds of Prey vol. 3 #9
- Catwoman vol. 4 #9
- Detective Comics vol. 2 #9
- Nightwing vol. 3 #8-9
- Red Hood and the Outlaws #9

== Collected editions ==
Title	Contents	Publication date	ISBN
Batman Vol. 1: The Court of Owls	Batman (vol. 2) #1–7	May 2012	978-1401235413
Batman Unwrapped: The Court of Owls	Batman (vol. 2) #1–7 (pencils only)	September 2014	978-1401245078
Batman Noir: The Court of Owls	Batman (vol. 2) #1–7 (pencils and inks only)	December 2017	978-1401273958
Batman Vol. 2: The City of Owls	Batman (vol. 2) #8-12	April 2013	978-1401237776
Batman: The Court of Owls Saga	Batman (vol. 2) #1-11	September 2018	978-1401284336
Absolute Batman: The Court of Owls	Batman (vol. 2) #1-11	December 2015	978-1401259105
Batman by Scott Snyder and Greg Capullo Omnibus Vol. 1	Batman (vol. 2) #1-33	November 2019	978-1401298845
Nightwing Vol. 2: Night of the Owls	Nightwing (vol. 3) #0, 8-12	August 2013	978-1401240271
Batman: Night of the Owls	All-Star Western (vol. 3) #9, Batman (vol. 2) #8–11, Annual (vol. 2) #1, Batman: The Dark Knight (vol. 2) #9, Detective Comics (vol. 2) #9, Batgirl (vol. 4) #9, Batwing #9, Birds of Prey (vol. 3) #9, Nightwing (vol. 3) #8–9, Batman and Robin (vol. 2) #9, Catwoman (vol. 4) #9, Red Hood and the Outlaws #9	November 2013	978-1401242527

== Aftermath ==
One of the titles introduced in the third wave of The New 52 was Talon (October 2012, cover dated December), featuring a new character called Calvin Rose, a former Talon himself, on the run from the Court of Owls.

== In other media ==
- The 2015 animated movie Batman vs. Robin loosely adapts Night of the Owls.
- Batman: The Court of Owls received a prose novelization in February 2019 written by Greg Cox, and published by Titan Books.
