= Justin Gray =

American comic book writer

- Area: Writer
- Notable works: Jonah Hex

Justin Gray is an American comic book writer working mostly for DC Comics. He is known for his diverse creation world and collaboration with Jimmy Palmiotti. He lives in Ossining, New York.

== Career ==
Justin Gray entered the comic book industry in the late 1990s to early 2000s. Early in his career he struggled to break into major publishers and often pitched ideas that were rejected because editors preferred established writers. According to industry reviews, one of his first opportunities when publisher Brian Pulido gave him work on Chastity Reimagined, helping Gary gain his first professional comic credit.

Justin Gary built his reputation in the early 2000s working for major publisher like DC Comics and Marvell Comics, as well as various other independent publishers. Much of his work blends elements of Western, crime, horror and science fiction, rather than focusing on traditional superhero stories. In an interview to Comic Book Resources, he said he likes working across genres and mediums and prefers not to limit himself to one type of storytelling.

Gray has often collaborated with fellow writer Jimmy Palmiotti on series such as Hawkman, Jonah Hex, Power Girl, 21 Down, Uncle Sam and the Freedom Fighters and The Resistance. The two also co-wrote Jonah Hex: No Way Back, an original graphic novel to coincide with the release of the film. Currently, along with Palmiotti, Gray is writing the monthly Jonah Hex and Freedom Fighters for DC Comics, as well as the miniseries Time Bomb for Radical Publishing.

In addition he has also worked on comic books based on video games like Prototype, as well as writing the screenplay for the Dead Space prequel animated film Dead Space: Downfall.

In a 2014 interview with ComicBook about the Kickstarter campaign for Sex & Violence Volume 2, he spoke about his desire to create experimental stories outside the constraints of mainstream superhero publishing.

== Bibliography ==
=== Comics ===
==== Wildstorm ====
- Gen 13 vol. 3 #0, "21 Down" and "The Resistance" (with Jimmy Palmiotti, Jesús Saiz and Juan Santacruz, July 2002)
- 21 Down #1-12 (September 2002-September 2003)
  - The Conduit (tpb, 176 pages, 2003, ISBN 1-4012-0120-2) collects:
    - "Simple Kind of Life" (with Jimmy Palmiotti and Jesús Saiz, in #1, 2002)
    - "I Like to Wear Sheep's Clothing" (with Jimmy Palmiotti and Jesús Saiz, in #2, 2002)
    - "I'm Not Sick, But I'm Not Well" (with Jimmy Palmiotti and Jesús Saiz, in #3, 2002)
    - "Don't Stand Alone in These Strangest of Times" (with Jimmy Palmiotti and Jesús Saiz, in #4, 2002)
    - "Distance from One into the Other" (with Jimmy Palmiotti and Jesús Saiz, in #5, 2003)
    - "End of Night" (with Jimmy Palmiotti and Jesús Saiz, in #6, 2003)
    - "Transitions" (with Jimmy Palmiotti and Jesús Saiz, in #7, 2003)
  - "Roadside Attractions" (with Jimmy Palmiotti and Jesús Sáiz, in #8-12, 2003)
- The Resistance (limited series, September 2002-April 2003)
  - Resistance (tpb, 192 pages, 2009, ISBN 1-60010-407-X) collects:
    - "Weep for the Future" (with Jimmy Palmiotti and Juan Santacruz, in #1, 2002)
    - "Instant Karma's Gonna Get You" (with Jimmy Palmiotti and Juan Santacruz, in #2, 2002)
    - "The Cretin's Cloning & Feeding" (with Jimmy Palmiotti and Juan Santacruz, in #3, 2002)
    - "Big Fish Eat the Little Ones" (with Jimmy Palmiotti and Juan Santacruz, in #4, 2002)
    - "Blood in the Streets" (with Jimmy Palmiotti and Juan Santacruz, in #5, 2003)
    - "Sacrifices" (with Jimmy Palmiotti and Juan Santacruz, in #6, 2003)
    - "Untitled" (with Jimmy Palmiotti and Juan Santacruz, in #7, 2003)
    - "This is our Last Goodbye" (with Jimmy Palmiotti and Juan Santacruz, in #8, 2003)
- The Twilight Experiment (limited series, February 2005-July 2005)
  - The Twilight Experiment (tpb, 144 pages, 2011, ISBN 1-4012-3055-5) collects:
    - "Inherit the World" (with Jimmy Palmiotti and Juan Santacruz, in #1, 2005)
    - "The Boy Who Fell To Earth" (with Jimmy Palmiotti and Juan Santacruz, in #2, 2005)
    - "Learn To Swim" (with Jimmy Palmiotti and Juan Santacruz, in #3, 2005)
    - "Unfinished Business" (with Jimmy Palmiotti and Juan Santacruz, in #4, 2005)
    - "The Mind of God" (with Jimmy Palmiotti and Juan Santacruz, in #5, 2005)
    - "Choices" (with Jimmy Palmiotti and Juan Santacruz, in #6, 2005)
- Friday the 13th (6-issue limited series with Jimmy Palmiotti and Adam Archer, December 2006-May 2007, collected in Friday the 13th, tpb, 144 pages, 2007, ISBN 1-84576-625-3)
- Midnighter #9, "The Hercules Virus" (with Jimmy Palmiotti and Brian Stelfreeze, July 2007)
- Prototype (6-issue limited series with Jimmy Palmiotti, Darick Robertson and Mat Jacobs, April–September 2009, collected in Prototype, tpb, 168 pages, 2010, ISBN 1-4012-2671-X)

==== DC Comics ====
- Monolith #1-12 (February 2004-January 2005)
  - "Heart of Stone" (with Jimmy Palmiotti and Phil Winslade, in #1-3, 2004)
  - "Last Rites" (with Jimmy Palmiotti and Phil Winslade, in #4-5, 2004)
  - "Friendly Fire" (with Jimmy Palmiotti and Tomm Coker, in #6-8, 2004)
  - "All Old Things are New Again" (with Jimmy Palmiotti and Phil Winslade, in #9-10, 2004)
  - "Frantic" (with Jimmy Palmiotti and Peter Snejberg, in #11, 2004)
  - "Bloodbath in Red Hook" (with Jimmy Palmiotti and Peter Snejberg, in #12, 2005)
- Hawkman vol. 4 #28-49 (May 2004-February 2006)
  - "Fate's Warning" (with Jimmy Palmiotti and Ryan Sook, in #28-31, 2004)
  - "Terror Beneath the Ice" (with Jimmy Palmiotti and Joe Bennett, in #32, 2004)
  - "Earth and Sky" (with Jimmy Palmiotti and Andy Smith, in #33, 2004)
  - "The Gift" (with Jimmy Palmiotti and Ryan Sook, in #34, 2004)
  - "The Tower of Silence" (with Jimmy Palmiotti and Joe Bennett, in #35, 2004)
  - "The Army of Forgotten Souls" (with Jimmy Palmiotti and Joe Bennett, in #36, 2005)
  - Rise of the Golden Eagle (tpb, 208 pages, 2006, ISBN 1-4012-1092-9) collects:
    - "Farewell, My Enemy" (with Jimmy Palmiotti, Joe Bennett and Dale Eaglesham, in #37-41, 2005)
    - "Aftermath" (with Jimmy Palmiotti and Stephen Sadowski, in #42, 2005)
    - "I Fly in the Face of Danger" (with Jimmy Palmiotti and Joe Bennett, in #43, 2005)
    - "My Enemy Revealed" (with Jimmy Palmiotti and Joe Bennett, in #44-45, 2005)
  - "Sins of the Past, Present and Future" (with Jimmy Palmiotti, Ron Randall and Art Thibert, in #46, 2005)
  - "Coalition in Crisis" (with Jimmy Palmiotti and Chris Batista, in #47-49, 2005–2006)
- Jonah Hex vol. 2 #1-70 (November 2005-August 2011)
  - Face Full of Violence (tpb, 144 pages, 2006, ISBN 1-4012-1095-3) collects:
    - "Giving the Devil His Due" (with Jimmy Palmiotti and Luke Ross, in #1, 2005)
    - "Bullets of Silver, Cross of Gold!" (with Jimmy Palmiotti and Luke Ross, in #2, 2005)
    - "Eye For an Eye" (with Jimmy Palmiotti and Luke Ross, in #3, 2006)
    - "The Time I Almost Died" (with Jimmy Palmiotti and Luke Ross, in #4, 2006)
    - "Christmas With the Outlaws" (with Jimmy Palmiotti and Tony DeZuniga, in #5, 2006)
    - "Goin' Back to Texas in a Box" (with Jimmy Palmiotti and Luke Ross, in #6, 2006)
  - Guns of Vengeance (tpb, 144 pages, 2007, ISBN 1-4012-1249-2) collects:
    - "One Wedding & Fifty Funerals" (with Jimmy Palmiotti and Luke Ross, in #7, 2006)
    - "Never Turn a Blind Eye" (with Jimmy Palmiotti, Val Semeiks and Dylan Teague, in #8, 2006)
    - "Gettin' Un-Haunted" (with Jimmy Palmiotti and Tony DeZuniga, in #9, 2006)
    - "Gator Bait" (with Jimmy Palmiotti and Phil Noto, in #10, 2006)
    - "The Hangin' Tree" (with Jimmy Palmiotti and David Michael Beck, in #11, 2006)
    - "Bloodstained Snow" (with Jimmy Palmiotti and Paul Gulacy, in #12, 2006)
  - Origins (tpb, 144 pages, 2007, ISBN 1-4012-1490-8) collects:
    - "Retribution" (with Jimmy Palmiotti and Jordi Bernet, in #13-15, 2006–2007)
    - "The Ballad of Tallulah Black" (with Jimmy Palmiotti and Phil Noto, in #16-17, 2007)
    - "I Walk Alone" (with Jimmy Palmiotti and Val Semeiks, in #18, 2007)
  - Only the Good Die Young (tpb, 144 pages, 2008, ISBN 1-4012-1689-7) collects:
    - "Texas Money" (with Jimmy Palmiotti and Phil Noto, in #19, 2007)
    - "Unfinished Business" (with Jimmy Palmiotti and Phil Noto, in #20, 2007)
    - "Devil's Paw" (with Jimmy Palmiotti and Jordi Bernet, in #21, 2007)
    - "The Current War" (with Jimmy Palmiotti and Phil Noto, in #22, 2007)
    - "Who Lives and Who Dies" (with Jimmy Palmiotti and Jordi Bernet, in #23, 2007)
    - "All Hallows Eve" (with Jimmy Palmiotti and David Michael Beck, in #24, 2007)
  - Luck Runs Out (tpb, 144 pages, 2008, ISBN 1-4012-1960-8) collects:
    - "My Name is Nobody" (with Jimmy Palmiotti and Russ Heath, in #25, 2007)
    - "Four Little Pigs: A Grindhouse Western" (with Jimmy Palmiotti and Giuseppe Camuncoli, in #26, 2007)
    - "Star Man" (with Jimmy Palmiotti and Jordi Bernet, in #27, 2008)
    - "Townkiller" (with Jimmy Palmiotti and John Higgins, in #28, 2008)
    - "Return to Devil's Paw" (with Jimmy Palmiotti and Rafael Garres, in #29, 2008)
    - "Luck Runs Out" (with Jimmy Palmiotti and Jordi Bernet, in #30, 2008)
  - Bullets Don't Lie (tpb, 144 pages, 2009, ISBN 1-4012-2157-2) collects:
    - "The Red Mask" (with Jimmy Palmiotti and Paulo Siqueira, in #31, 2008)
    - "The Matador" (with Jimmy Palmiotti and Jordi Bernet, in #32, 2008)
    - "The Hunting Trip" (with Jimmy Palmiotti and Darwyn Cooke, in #33, 2008)
    - "Outrunning Shadows" (with Jimmy Palmiotti and Mark Sparacio, in #34, 2008)
    - "A Crude Offer" (with Jimmy Palmiotti and J.H. Williams III, in #35, 2008)
    - "Seven Graves Six Feet Deep" (with Jimmy Palmiotti and Rafael Garres, in #36, 2008)
  - Lead Poisoning (tpb, 144 pages, 2009, ISBN 1-4012-2485-7) collects:
    - "Trouble Comes in Threes" (with Jimmy Palmiotti and Jordi Bernet, in #37, 2008)
    - "Hell or High Water" (with Jimmy Palmiotti and Jordi Bernet, in #38, 2008)
    - "Cowardice" (with Jimmy Palmiotti and Rafael Garres, in #39, 2009)
    - "Sawbones The First Half" (with Jimmy Palmiotti and David Michael Beck, in #40, 2009)
    - "Sawbones The Second Half" (with Jimmy Palmiotti and David Michael Beck, in #41, 2009)
    - "Shooting the Sun" (with Jimmy Palmiotti and Jordi Bernet, in #42, 2009)
  - Six Gun War (tpb, 144 pages, 2010, ISBN 1-4012-2587-X) collects:
    - "The Six Gun War" (with Jimmy Palmiotti and Cristiano Cucina, in #44-49, 2009)
  - Counting Corpses (tpb, 144 pages, 2010, ISBN 1-4012-2899-2) collects:
    - "The Hyde House Massacre" (with Jimmy Palmiotti and Paul Gulacy, in #43, 2009)
    - "The Great Silence" (with Jimmy Palmiotti and Darwyn Cooke, in #50, 2009)
    - "Divining Rod" (with Jimmy Palmiotti and Dick Giordano, in #51, 2010)
    - "Too Mean To Die" (with Jimmy Palmiotti and Jordi Bernet, in #52, 2010)
    - "You'll Never Dance Again" (with Jimmy Palmiotti and Billy Tucci, in #53, 2010)
    - "Shooting Stars" (with Jimmy Palmiotti and Jordi Bernet, in #54, 2010)
  - Tall Tales (tpb, 144 pages, 2011, ISBN 1-4012-3009-1) collects:
    - "The Brief Life of Billy Dynamite" (with Jimmy Palmiotti and Vicente Alcazar, in #55, 2010)
    - "First True Love" (with Jimmy Palmiotti and C. P. Smith, in #56, 2010)
    - "More Than Enough" (with Jimmy Palmiotti and Phil Winslade, in #56, 2010)
    - "Tall Tales" (with Jimmy Palmiotti and Jordi Bernet, in #57, 2010)
    - "Every Bullet Tells a Story" (with Jimmy Palmiotti and Giancarlo Caracuzzo, in #58, 2010)
    - "Riders on the Storm" (with Jimmy Palmiotti and Jordi Bernet, in #59, 2010)
    - "Blood Lies Bleeding" (with Jimmy Palmiotti and Brian Stelfreeze, in #60, 2010)
  - Bury Me In Hell (tpb, 224 pages, 2011, ISBN 1-4012-3249-3) collects:
    - "Honeymoon Bullets" (with Jimmy Palmiotti and Jordi Bernet, in #61, 2010)
    - "The Package" (with Jimmy Palmiotti and Eduardo Risso, in #62, 2010)
    - "Bury Me In Hell" (with Jimmy Palmiotti and Jordi Bernet, in #63, 2011)
    - "Lovesick" (with Jimmy Palmiotti and Nelson DeCastro, in #64, 2011)
    - "Snowblind" (with Jimmy Palmiotti and Jordi Bernet, in #65, 2011)
    - "Casket Canyon" (with Jimmy Palmiotti and Fiona Staples, in #66, 2011)
    - "Ghost Town" (with Jimmy Palmiotti and Jordi Bernet, in #67, 2011)
    - "Murder in Cottonwood" (with Jimmy Palmiotti and Rafael Garres, in #68, 2011)
    - "The Old Man" (with Jimmy Palmiotti and Jeff Lemire, in #69, 2011)
    - "Weird Western" (with Jimmy Palmiotti, Ryan Sook and Diego Olmos, in #70, 2011)
- Batman: Legends of the Dark Knight vol. 1 #204-206 (April 2006-May 2006)
  - "The Madmen of Gotham" (with Steven Cummings, in #204-206, 2006)
- The Battle for Blüdhaven (6-issue limited series with Jimmy Palmiotti and Dan Jurgens, April–July 2006, collected in Battle for Blüdhaven tpb, 144 pages, 2007, ISBN 1-4012-1199-2)
- Brave New World, oneshot, "Uncle Sam and the Freedom Fighters" (with Jimmy Palmiotti and Daniel Acuña, June 2006)
- Superman Returns: Prequel #1 "Krypton to Earth" (with Jimmy Palmiotti, Bryan Singer, Michael Dougherty, Dan Harris and Ariel Olivetti, June 2006, collected in Superman Returns: The Prequels, tpb, 128 pages, 2007, ISBN 1-4012-1146-1)
- Uncle Sam and the Freedom Fighters vol. 1 (limited series, July 2006-February 2007)
  - Uncle Sam and the Freedom Fighters (tpb, 208 pages, 2007, ISBN 1-4012-1336-7) collects:
    - "Freedom Fighters" (with Jimmy Palmiotti and Daniel Acuña, in #1, 2006)
    - "Arresting America" (with Jimmy Palmiotti and Daniel Acuña, in #2, 2006)
    - "First Strike" (with Jimmy Palmiotti and Daniel Acuña, in #3, 2006)
    - "A Call To Arms" (with Jimmy Palmiotti and Daniel Acuña, in #4, 2006)
    - "Freedom Denied" (with Jimmy Palmiotti and Daniel Acuña, in #5, 2006)
    - "The Returning of Champions" (with Jimmy Palmiotti and Daniel Acuña, in #6, 2006)
    - "Traitors and Patriots" (with Jimmy Palmiotti and Daniel Acuña, in #7, 2007)
    - "Liberty and Justice for All" (with Jimmy Palmiotti and Daniel Acuña, in #8, 2007)
- Supergirl vol. 5 #12, "Rock On!" (with Jimmy Palmiotti and Amanda Conner, November 2006, collected in Identity, tpb, 256 pages, 2007, ISBN 1-4012-1484-3)
- Countdown to Final Crisis #50, 46–45, 43, 38, 34, 30, 26, 24, 17, 12-8 (March 2007-January 2008)
  - "Last Laugh" (with Jimmy Palmiotti, Paul Dini and Jim Calafiore, in #50, 2007)
  - "Weapon of War" (with Jimmy Palmiotti, Paul Dini and Jesús Saiz, in #46, 2007)
  - "Monitor Duty" (with Jimmy Palmiotti, Paul Dini and Jim Calafiore, in #45, 2007)
  - "The Funeral" (with Jimmy Palmiotti, Paul Dini and Manuel Garcia and David López, in #43, 2007)
  - "All Hell!" (with Jimmy Palmiotti, Paul Dini and Jesús Saíz, in #38, 2007)
  - "Searching for Answers" (with Jimmy Palmiotti, Paul Dini, Keith Giffen and Jesús Saiz, in #34, 2007)
  - "Family Feud" (with Jimmy Palmiotti, Paul Dini, Keith Giffen and Jesús Saiz, in #30, 2007)
  - "Halfway to Hell" (with Jimmy Palmiotti, Paul Dini, Keith Giffen and Scott Kolins, in #26, 2007)
  - "Prime Example" (with Jimmy Palmiotti, Paul Dini and Tom Derenick, in #24, 2007)
  - "This Means War" (with Jimmy Palmiotti, Paul Dini, Keith Giffen and Ron Lim, in #17, 2007)
  - "Come Together" (with Paul Dini, Keith Giffen and Tom Derenick, in #12, 2007)
  - "Eye of the Beholder" (with Jimmy Palmiotti, Paul Dini, Keith Giffen and Mike Norton, in #11, 2007)
  - "The Gods Must be Crazy!" (with Jimmy Palmiotti, Paul Dini, Keith Giffen and Scott Kolins, in #10, 2007)
  - "Pay the Piper" (with Jimmy Palmiotti, Paul Dini and Tom Derenick, in #9, 2007)
  - "Homeward Bound" (with Jimmy Palmiotti, Paul Dini and Carlos Magno, in #8, 2008)
- Countdown to Adventure #1-8 (August 2007-March 2008)
  - Countdown to Adventure (tpb, 192 pages, 2008, ISBN 1-4012-1823-7) collects:
    - "Forerunner" (with Fabrizio Fiorentino and Travis Moore, in #1-8, 2007–2009)
- JLA Classified #42-46 (September 2007-November 2007)
  - "The Ghosts of Mars" (with Rick Leonardi, in #42-46, 2007)
- Superman Confidential #6-7 (September 2007-October 2007)
  - "Welcome to Mer-tropolis" (with Jimmy Palmiotti and Koi Turnbull, in #6-7, 2007)
- Uncle Sam and the Freedom Fighters vol. 2 (limited series, September 2007-April 2008)
  - Uncle Sam and the Freedom Fighters: Brave New World (tpb, 192 pages, 2008, ISBN 1-4012-1954-3) collects:
    - "Uncle Sam and the Freedom Fighters" (with Jimmy Palmiotti and Renato Arlem, in #1, 2007)
    - "Fame" (with Jimmy Palmiotti and Renato Arlem, in #2, 2007)
    - "The Kids Are Not All Right" (with Jimmy Palmiotti and Renato Arlem, in #3, 2007)
    - "Life in Miniature" (with Jimmy Palmiotti and Renato Arlem, in #4, 2007)
    - "Be Careful What You Wish For" (with Jimmy Palmiotti and Renato Arlem, in #5, 2008)
    - "Into the Unknown" (with Jimmy Palmiotti and Renato Arlem, in #6, 2008)
    - "The Universal" (with Jimmy Palmiotti and Renato Arlem, in #7, 2008)
    - "Let Freedom Ring" (with Jimmy Palmiotti and Renato Arlem, in #8, 2008)
- Superman/Supergirl: Maelstrom (limited series, November 2008-January 2009)
  - Superman/Supergirl: Maelstrom (tpb, 128 pages, 2009, ISBN 1-4012-2508-X) collects:
    - "Maelstrom" (with Jimmy Palmiotti and Phil Noto, in #1-5, 2008–2009)
- Terra (limited series, November 2008-December 2008)
  - Terra (tpb, 128 pages, 2009, ISBN 1-4012-2510-1) collects:
    - "Can You Dig It?" (with Jimmy Palmiotti and Amanda Conner, in #1, 2008)
    - "Who Are You?" (with Jimmy Palmiotti and Amanda Conner, in #2, 2008)
    - "Far Away Home" (with Jimmy Palmiotti and Amanda Conner, in #3, 2008)
    - "For Those About to Rock!" (with Jimmy Palmiotti and Amanda Conner, in #4, 2008)
- Power Girl vol. 2 #1-12 (May 2009-May 2012)
  - A New Beginning (tpb, 160 pages, 2010, ISBN 1-4012-2618-3) collects:
    - "A New Beginning" (with Jimmy Palmiotti and Amanda Conner, in #1, 2009)
    - "Unleashing the Beast" (with Jimmy Palmiotti and Amanda Conner, in #2, 2009)
    - "Gorilla Warfare" (with Jimmy Palmiotti and Amanda Conner, in #3, 2009)
    - "Girls' Night Out!" (with Jimmy Palmiotti and Amanda Conner, in #4, 2009)
    - "Space Girls Gone Wild!" (with Jimmy Palmiotti and Amanda Conner, in #5-6, 2009)
  - Aliens & Apes (tpb, 144 pages, 2010, ISBN 1-4012-2910-7) collecs:
    - "Lust in Space" (with Jimmy Palmiotti and Amanda Conner, in #7, 2009)
    - "A Groovy Kind of Love" (with Jimmy Palmiotti and Amanda Conner, in #8, 2010)
    - "This City is a Zoo" (with Jimmy Palmiotti and Amanda Conner, in #9, 2010)
    - "War on Terra" (with Jimmy Palmiotti and Amanda Conner, in #10, 2010)
    - "Terra Alert!" (with Jimmy Palmiotti and Amanda Conner, in #11, 2010)
    - "The Little Things!" (with Jimmy Palmiotti and Amanda Conner, in #12, 2010)
- Jonah Hex: No Way Back (graphic novel, with Jimmy Palmiotti and Tony DeZuniga, hc, 136 pages, June 2010, ISBN 1-4012-2550-0)
- Freedom Fighters vol. 2 #1-9 (September 2010-May 2011)
  - American Nightmare (tpb, 144 pages, 2011, ISBN 1-4012-3171-3) collects:
    - "American Nightmare" (with Jimmy Palmiotti and Travis Moore, in #1-9, 2010–2011)
- All-Star Western vol. 3 #1-34 (September 2011-August 2014)
  - Volume 1: Guns and Gotham (tpb, 192 pages, 2012, ISBN 1-4012-3709-6) collects:
    - "No Rest for the Wicked" (with Jimmy Palmiotti and Moritat, in #1, 2011)
    - "Showdown at House Arkham" (with Jimmy Palmiotti and Moritat, in #2, 2011)
    - "El Diablo" (with Jimmy Palmiotti and Jordi Bernet, in #2-3, 2011)
    - "No News is Good" (with Jimmy Palmiotti and Moritat, in #3, 2011)
    - "In The Dark Underbelly of Gotham!" (with Jimmy Palmiotti and Moritat, in #4, 2011)
    - "The Barbary Ghost" (with Jimmy Palmiotti and Phil Winslade, in #4-6, 2011–2012)
    - "Gotham Underground" (with Jimmy Palmiotti and Moritat, in #5, 2012)
    - "Beneath the Bat Cave" (with Jimmy Palmiotti and Moritat, in #6, 2012)
  - Volume 2: War of Lords and Owls (tpb, 192 pages, 2013, ISBN 1-4012-3851-3) collects:
    - "The Arena" (with Jimmy Palmiotti and Moritat, in #7, 2012)
    - "Nighthawk & Cinnamon!" (with Jimmy Palmiotti, Moritat and Patrick Scherberger, in #7, 2012)
    - "The August 7" (with Jimmy Palmiotti and Moritat, in #8, 2012)
    - "Dark as the Dungeon" (with Jimmy Palmiotti, and Patrick Scherberger, in #8, 2012)
    - "Night of the Owls: Vengeance in the Big Easy" (with Jimmy Palmiotti and Moritat, in #9, 2012)
    - "The King of Carnival" (with Jimmy Palmiotti, and Patrick Scherberger, in #9, 2012)
    - "The War of Lords and Owls" (with Jimmy Palmiotti and Moritat, in #10-12, 2012)
    - "Unholy Matrimony" (with Jimmy Palmiotti, and José Luis García-López, in #10, 2012)
    - "The Haunted Highwayman!" (with Jimmy Palmiotti, and Scott Kollins, in #11-12, 2012)
  - Volume 3: The Black Diamond Probability (tpb, 224 pages, 2013, ISBN 1-4012-4399-1) collects:
    - "Untitled" (with Jimmy Palmiotti and Moritat, in #0, 2012)
    - "The Strange Case of Dr. Arkham and Mr. Hex" (with Jimmy Palmiotti and Moritat, in #13, 2012)
    - "Tomahawk" (with Jimmy Palmiotti and Phil Winslade, in #13-16, 2012–2013)
    - "Hyde in America" (with Jimmy Palmiotti and Moritat, in #14, 2012)
    - "Strange Medicine" (with Jimmy Palmiotti and Moritat, in #15, 2012)
    - "It's a Madhouse" (with Jimmy Palmiotti and Moritat, in #16, 2013)
  - Volume 4: Gold Standard (tpb, 176 pages, 2014, ISBN 1-4012-4626-5)
    - "Standing on Death's Doorstep" (with Jimmy Palmiotti and Moritat, in #17, 2013)
    - "19th Century Stormwatch" (with Jimmy Palmiotti and Staz Johnson, in #17, 2013)
    - "Frozen City" (with Jimmy Palmiotti and Moritat, in #18, 2013)
    - "Stormwatch, featuring Doctor Terrence 13" (with Jimmy Palmiotti and Staz Johnson, in #18, 2013)
    - "Panning for Gold" (with Jimmy Palmiotti and Moritat, in #19, 2013)
    - "The Master Gunfighter" (with Jimmy Palmiotti and Staz Johnson, in #19, 2013)
    - "Gold Standard" (with Jimmy Palmiotti and Moritat, in #20, 2013)
    - "Stormwatch: The Lost City of Gold" (with Jimmy Palmiotti and Staz Johnson, in #20-21, 2013)
    - "Where do we go from here?" (with Jimmy Palmiotti and Moritat, in #21, 2013)
  - Volume 5: Man Out of Time (tpb, 192 pages, 2014, ISBN 1-4012-4993-0) collects:
    - "Welcome To The Asylum" (with Jimmy Palmiotti and Moritat, in #22, 2013)
    - "Man Out of Time" (with Jimmy Palmiotti and Moritat, in #23, 2013)
    - "Justified" (with Jimmy Palmiotti and Moritat, in #24, 2013)
    - "Blood, Sex & Magic" (with Jimmy Palmiotti and Moritat, in #25, 2013)
    - "What is and What Will Never Be." (with Jimmy Palmiotti, Staz Johnson, and Moritat, in #26, 2013)
    - "The Unforgiving Truth" (with Jimmy Palmiotti and Moritat, in #27, 2014)
    - "The New Frontier" (with Jimmy Palmiotti and Staz Johnson, in #28, 2014)
  - Volume 6: End of the Trail (tpb, 144 pages, 2015, ISBN 1-4012-5413-6) collects:
    - "Bad Decisions" (with Jimmy Palmiotti and Cliff Richards, in #29, 2014)
    - "Home Again" (with Jimmy Palmiotti and Staz Johnson, in #30, 2014)
    - "The Other Side" (with Jimmy Palmiotti and José Luis García-López, in #30-31, 2014)
    - "Bad Intentions" (with Jimmy Palmiotti and Staz Johnson, in #31, 2014)
    - "This Town's No Good" (with Jimmy Palmiotti and Staz Johnson, in #32, 2014)
    - "The End In Sight" (with Jimmy Palmiotti and Staz Johnson, in #33, 2014)
    - "Final Curtain" (with Jimmy Palmiotti and Darwyn Cooke, in #34, 2014)
- The Ray vol. 3 (limited series, December 2011-March 2012)
  - "The Ray" (with Jimmy Palmiotti and Jamal Igle, in #1-4, 2011–2012)
- G.I. Combat vol. 3 #0-7 (May 2012-December 2012)
  - Volume 1: The War That Time Forgot (tpb, 256 pages, 2013, ISBN 1-4012-3853-X) collects:
    - "The Unknown Soldier" (with Jimmy Palmiotti, Dan Panosian and Staz Johnson, in #1-7, 2012)
    - "A Deeper Mystery" (with Jimmy Palmiotti and Staz Johnson, in #0, 2012)
- Phantom Lady (limited series, August 2012-November 2012)
  - "Chasing Shadows" (with Jimmy Palmiotti and Cat Staggs, in #1, 2012)
  - "To Live And Die In Metropolis" (with Jimmy Palmiotti and Cat Staggs, in #2, 2012)
  - "The Dead Can Dance... And Die!" (with Jimmy Palmiotti and Cat Staggs, in #3, 2012)
  - "Out of the Shadows and into the Light" (with Jimmy Palmiotti and Cat Staggs, in #4, 2012)
- Ame-Comi Girls (October 2012-October 2013)
  - Volume 1 (tpb, 168 pages, 2013, ISBN 1-4012-4253-7) collects:
    - "Featuring Wonder Woman" (with Jimmy Palmiotti and Amanda Conner, in #1, 2012)
    - "Featuring Batgirl" (with Jimmy Palmiotti and Sanford Greene, in #2, 2012)
    - "Featuring Duela Dent" (with Jimmy Palmiotti and Ted Naifeh, in #3, 2012)
    - "Featuring Power Girl" (with Jimmy Palmiotti and Mike Bowden, in #4, 2013)
    - "Featuring Supergirl" (with Jimmy Palmiotti and Santi Casas, in #5, 2013)
  - Volume 2: Rise of the Brainiac (tpb, 144 pages, 2014, ISBN 1-4012-4687-7) collects:
    - "Rise of the Brainiac" (with Jimmy Palmiotti and Eduardo Francisco, in #1-2, 2013)
    - "The Chosen" (with Jimmy Palmiotti, Santi Casas, Eduardo Francisco, Derec Donovan, Horacio Domingues and Ted Naifeh in #3-5, 2013)
  - Volume 3: Earth in Crisis (tpb, 144 pages, 2014, ISBN 1-4012-5037-8) collects:
    - "Earth in Crisis" (with Jimmy Palmiotti, Horacio Domingues and Eduardo Francisco, in #6, 2013)
    - "The Teen Hellions" (with Jimmy Palmiotti, Horacio Domingues and Eduardo Francisco, in #7, 2013)
    - "Big Barda and the Space Pirates/White Canary vs. Pinky Violence" (with Jimmy Palmiotti and Adam Archer, in #8, 2013)
    - "White Canary vs. Pinky Violence" (with Jimmy Palmiotti and Adam Archer, in #8, 2013)
    - "Mera, Queen of Atlantis" (with Jimmy Palmiotti and Steven Cummings, in #8, 2013)
- Human Bomb (limited series, December 2012-March 2013)
  - "Mad, Bad and Dangerous to Know" (with Jimmy Palmiotti and Jerry Ordway, in #1, 2012)
  - "Ticking Clock" (with Jimmy Palmiotti and Jerry Ordway, in #2, 2013)
  - "Behind Enemy-Lines" (with Jimmy Palmiotti and Jerry Ordway, in #3, 2013)
  - "The Ultimate Sacrifice" (with Jimmy Palmiotti and Jerry Ordway, in #4, 2013)
- Batwing #19-34 (April 2013-September 2014)
  - Volume 4: Welcome to the Family (tpb, 192 pages, 2014, ISBN 1-4012-4631-1) collects:
    - "The End Of The Beginning" (with Jimmy Palmiotti and Eduardo Pansica, in #19, 2013)
    - "Batwing V. 2.0: Welcome to the Family" (with Jimmy Palmiotti, Eduardo Pansica, in #20, 2013)
    - "Lion-Mane's Fangs Of Doom!" (with Jimmy Palmiotti and Eduardo Pansica, in #21, 2013)
    - "Daddy Issues" (with Jimmy Palmiotti and Eduardo Pansica, in #22, 2013)
    - "Smash" (with Jimmy Palmiotti and Eduardo Pansica, in #23, 2013)
    - "I Can't Catch A Break" (with Jimmy Palmiotti and Eduardo Pansica, in #24, 2013)
    - "Keep Your Enemies Closer" (with Jimmy Palmiotti and Eduardo Pansica, in #25, 2013)
    - "When in Rome (Sort of)" (with Jimmy Palmiotti and Eduardo Pansica, in #26, 2013)
  - Volume 5: Into the Dark (tpb, 208 pages, 2015, ISBN 1-4012-5081-5) collects:
    - "Not All That Glitters" (with Jimmy Palmiotti and Eduardo Pansica, in #27, 2014)
    - "Untitled" (with Jimmy Palmiotti and Eduardo Pansica, in #28, 2014)
    - "Going Down To The Underground" (with Jimmy Palmiotti and Eduardo Pansica, in #29, 2014)
    - "Underbelly" (with Jimmy Palmiotti and Eduardo Pansica, in #30, 2014)
    - "Into The Dark" (with Jimmy Palmiotti and Eduardo Pansica, in #31, 2014)
    - "Family Is Everything" (with Jimmy Palmiotti and Eduardo Pansica, in #32, 2014)
    - "Gruesome George" (with Jimmy Palmiotti and Eduardo Pansica, in #33, 2014)
    - "Purpose" (with Jimmy Palmiotti and Eduardo Pansica, in #34, 2014)
    - "Leviathan Rises" (with Jimmy Palmiotti and Eduardo Pansica, in Batwing: Futures End #1, 2014)
- Batman: The Dark Knight vol. 2 #23.2: Mister Freeze (with Jimmy Palmiotti and Jason Masters, September 2013)
- Star-Spangled War Stories Featuring G.I. Zombie #1-8 (July 2014–March 2015)
  - G.I. Zombie: A Star-Spangled War Story (tpb, 176 pages, 2015, ISBN 1-4012-5487-X) collects:
    - "G.I. Zombie" (with Jimmy Palmiotti and Scott Hampton, in #1-2, 2014)
    - "Small Town Welcome" (with Jimmy Palmiotti and Scott Hampton, in #3, 2014)
    - "Exit Strategy" (with Jimmy Palmiotti and Scott Hampton, in #4, 2014)
    - "Door-to-Door Delivery" (with Jimmy Palmiotti and Scott Hampton, in #5, 2014)
    - "The Living Desert" (with Jimmy Palmiotti and Scott Hampton, in #6, 2015)
    - "Two the Hard Way" (with Jimmy Palmiotti and Scott Hampton, in #7, 2015)
    - "The Final Countdown" (with Jimmy Palmiotti and Scott Hampton, in #8, 2015)
  - "United States of the Dead" (with Jimmy Palmiotti and Scott Hampton, in Futures End#1, 2014) collected in Futures End: Five Years Later Omnibus (hc, 912 pages, 2014, ISBN 1-4012-5129-3)
- Convergence: Action Comics (2-issue limited series, with Claude St. Aubin, April–May 2015, collected in Convergence: Infinite Earths Book 1, tpb, 272 pages, 2015, ISBN 1-4012-5837-9)
- Convergence: Catwoman (2-issue limited series, with Ron Randall, April–May 2015, collected in Convergence: Zero Hour Book One, tpb, 272 pages, 2015, ISBN 1-4012-5839-5)
- Harley Quinn and Power Girl (June 2015-November 2015)
  - Harley Quinn and Power Girl (tpb, 152 pages, 2016, ISBN 1-4012-5974-X) collects:
    - "Extrastellar Exploitations" (with Jimmy Palmiotti, Amanda Conner and Stéphane Roux, in #1, 2015)
    - "Excess of Exes" (with Jimmy Palmiotti, Amanda Conner and Stéphane Roux and Elliot Fernandez, in #2, 2015)
    - "Insurance Waivers" (with Jimmy Palmiotti, Amanda Conner and Stéphane Roux, Elliot Fernandez, and Moritat, in #3, 2015)
    - "Purity" (with Jimmy Palmiotti, Amanda Conner and Stéphane Roux and Elliot Fernandez, in #4, 2015)
    - "Bighead Space-God" (with Jimmy Palmiotti, Amanda Conner and Stéphane Roux and Flaviano, in #5, 2015)

==== Image Comics ====
- Cloudburst (graphic novel, with Jimmy Palmiotti, Eliseu Gouveia and Christopher Shy, tpb, 64 pages, June 2004, ISBN 1-58240-368-6)
- Random Acts of Violence (graphic novel, with Jimmy Palmiotti and Giancarlo Caracuzzo, tpb, 72 pages, 2010, ISBN 1-60706-264-X)
- Trailblazer (graphic novel, with Jimmy Palmiotti and Jim Daly, tpb, 60 pages, June 2011, ISBN 1-60706-386-7)
- Retrovirus (graphic novel, with Jimmy Palmiotti and Norberto Fernandez, hc, 64 pages, November 2014, ISBN 1-60706-640-8)
- Creator-Owned Heroes #1-8, "Trigger Girl 6" and "Killswitch" (with Jimmy Palmiotti, Phil Noto and Jerry Lando June 2012-January 2013)

==== Marvel Comics ====
- The Punisher: Red X-Mas, one-shot (with Jimmy Palmiotti and Mark Texeira, December 2004)
- Daughters of the Dragon (6-issue limited series with Jimmy Palmiotti and Khari Evans, January–June 2006, collected in Daughters of the Dragon, tpb, 144 pages, 2006, ISBN 0-7851-1944-2)
- The Punisher: Bloody Valentine, one-shot (with Jimmy Palmiotti and Paul Gulacy, February 2006)
- Marvel Adventures: Fantastic Four (June 2006-September 2006)
  - Volume 4: Cosmic Threats (tpb, 96 pages, 2006, ISBN 0-7851-2208-7) collects:
    - "FF Phone Home" (with Juan Santacruz, in #13, 2006)
    - "The Most Dangerous Game" (with Staz Johnson, in #14, 2006)
    - "Its Name Was Terminus From Outer Space!!" (with Juan Santacruz, in #15, 2006)
    - "Oh Captain, My Captain Marvel" (with Juan Santacruz, in #16, 2006)
- Marvel Westerns: Kid Colt and the Arizona Girl, one-shot, "Last Stage to Oblivion" (with Jimmy Palmiotti and Federica Manfredi, July 2006)
- Heroes for Hire vol. 2 (August 2006-February 2007)
  - Civil War: Heroes for Hire (tpb, 120 pages, 2009, ISBN 0-7851-4180-4) collects:
    - "Taking It To the Streets" (with Jimmy Palmiotti, Billy Tucci and Francis Portela, in #1-2, 2006)
    - "Civil Disobedience" (with Jimmy Palmiotti, Billy Tucci and Francis Portela, in #3, 2006)
    - "Untitled" (with Jimmy Palmiotti, Billy Tucci and Francis Portela, in #4-5, 2006)
  - "Guns, Gems, Robots and Terrorists!" (with Jimmy Palmiotti and Tom Palmer, in #6, 2007)
  - "Untitled" (with Jimmy Plamiotti and Tom Palmer, in #7, 2007)
- Claws (3-issue limited series, with Jimmy Palmiotti and Joseph Linsner, August–October 2006, collected in Claws, hc, 104 pages, 2007, ISBN 0-7851-1850-0)
- Shanna the She-Devil: Survival of the Fittest (limited series) (August 2007-November 2007)
  - Shanna the She-Devil: Survival of the Fittest (tpb, 104 pages, 2008, ISBN 0-7851-2412-8) collects:
    - "Pirates, Gangsters and Sea Monsters" (with Jimmy Palmiotti and Khari Evans, in #1, 2007)
    - "Run Rabbit Run" (with Jimmy Palmiotti and Khari Evans, in #2, 2007)
    - "Pit of Beasts" (with Jimmy Palmiotti and Khari Evans, in #3, 2007)
    - "Conclusion" (with Jimmy Palmiotti and Khari Evans, in #4, 2007)
- Claws II (3-issue limited series, with Jimmy Palmiotti and Joseph Linsner, July–September 2011, collected in Claws II, hc, 112 pages, 2011, ISBN 0-7851-5300-4)

==== Other publishers ====
- Mr. Keen, Tracer of Lost Persons (3-issue limited series, with Lee Ferguson, 2003, collected in Mr. Keen, Tracer of Lost Persons, tpb, 96 pages, 2009, ISBN 1-933076-49-6, Moonstone Books)
- Red Sonja: One More Day, one-shot (with Jimmy Palmiotti and Liam Sharp, November 2005, Dynamite Entertainment)
- The Hills Have Eyes: The Beginning (graphic novel, with Jimmy Palmiotti and John Higgins, collected in The Hills Have Eyes: The Beginning tpb, 112 pages, July 2007, ISBN 0-06-124354-X, Fox Atomic Comics)
- The Last Resort (5-issue limited series with Jimmy Palmiotti and Giancarlo Caracuzzo, July–December 2009, collected in The Last Resort, tpb, 120 pages, 2010, ISBN 1-60010-615-3, IDW Publishing)
- Time Bomb (3-issue limited series, with Jimmy Palmiotti and Paul Gulacy, July–December 2010, collected in Time Bomb, tpb, 168 pages, 2011, ISBN 1-935417-40-1, Radical Comics)
- Dark Horse Presents vol. 2 #16-19, "The Deap See" (with Jimmy Palmiotti and Tony Akins, September 2012 – December 2012, Dark Horse Comics)
- Sex and Violence: Volume 1 (graphic novel, with Jimmy Palmiotti, Jimmy Broxton and Juan Santacruz, March 2013, Paper Films)
- Weapon of God (graphic novel, with Jimmy Palmiotti and Giancarlo Caracuzzo, September 2013, Paper Films)
- Forager (graphic novel, with Jimmy Palmiotti and Steven Cummings, November 2013, tpb, 60 pages, 2015, ISBN 1-4778-3093-6, Paper Films & Jet City Comics)
- Dark Horse Presents vol. 3 #1-6, "Wrestling with Demons" (with Jimmy Palmiotti and Andy Kuhn, August 2014-January 2015, Dark Horse Comics)
- Wool (graphic novel, with Jimmy Palmiotti and Jimmy Broxton, tpb, 160 pages, 2014, ISBN 1-4778-4912-2, Jet City Comics)
- Denver (graphic novel, with Jimmy Palmiotti and Pier Brito, July 2014, Paper Films)
- The Lone Ranger: Vindicated (4-issue limited series, with Rey Villegas, November 2014-February 2015, Dynamite Entertainment)
- Sex and Violence: Volume 2 (graphic novel, with Jimmy Palmiotti, Rafa Garres, Romina Moranelli and Vanesa R. Del Rey, January 2015, Paper Films)
- Abbadon (graphic novel, with Jimmy Palmiotti, and Fabrizio Fiorentino, March 2015, tpb, 72 pages, 2015, ISBN 0-9960666-6-7, Paper Films & Adaptive Comics)

=== Films ===
- Dead Space: Downfall (with co-author Jimmy Palmiotti, 2008)

=== Video games ===
- Mortal Kombat vs. DC Universe (with co-author Jimmy Palmiotti and others, 2008)
