= 21 Down =

2002 WildStorm comic book series

- Cover to 21 Down #06.

Publication information
- Publisher: WildStorm
- Schedule: Monthly
- Format: Ongoing series
- Genre: Superhero
- Publication date: November 2002 - November 2003
- No. of issues: 12

Creative team
- Written by: Justin Gray; Jimmy Palmiotti
- Penciller: Jesus Saiz
- Inker: Jimmy Palmiotti

Collected editions
- The Conduit: ISBN 1-4012-0120-2

21 Down is a comic book published by WildStorm, and created by writers Justin Gray, Jimmy Palmiotti and artist Jesus Saiz.

== Publication history ==
The title was an ongoing series published as a twelve-issue "season". Depending on sales, the creators hoped to produce a second season. They planned to start the second season in the Eye of the Storm but it never happened.

== Plot ==
The comic tells the story of young Preston Kills, who could sense how people were going to die. Preston also knew that he was going to die at age 21, hence the title.

== Collected editions ==
Part of the first "season" was collected as a trade paperback:

- The Conduit (collects 21 Down #1-7, 176 pages, November 2003, ISBN 1-4012-0120-2)
