= Ascension (comic book) =

Comic book series by David Finch and Matt Banning

Publication information
- Publisher: Top Cow Productions
- Schedule: Monthly
- Format: Ongoing series
- Genre: see below
- Publication date: October 1997 - March 2000
- No. of issues: 22 (and a #0 and #½)

Creative team
- Created by: David Finch
- Written by: David Finch
- Artist(s): Matt Banning; Brian Ching

Collected editions
- Top Cow's Best of Dave Finch: ISBN 1-58240-638-3

Ascension was an American comic book series created by David Finch and Matt "Batt" Banning and published by Top Cow. It ran for 22 issues, from October 1997 to March 2000, and was then canceled due to low sales. In addition, there was a #0 bonus issue and a #1/2 Wizard preview.

== Publication history ==
Shortly after the start of the series, Batt left the title due to creative differences with Finch. Finch wrote and penciled the first half of the series. David Quinn wrote most of the last half, starting with issue #13 (May 1999); most of the last half was penciled by Brian Ching, though there were many issues penciled by fill-in artists.

== Plot ==
The basic premise of the comic book series was that the 1986 Chernobyl disaster opened a rift in reality that allowed two humanoid alien races with supernatural powers, the Mineans and Dayaks, to enter our world. The two races are at war, and it is hinted throughout the series that they have a close genetic relationship and close cultural ties with humanity, suggesting a mutual origin of some sort, though the series ended before the exact nature of that relationship could be made clear.

The two primary protagonists, Andromeda Weaver, an ambitious geneticist, and Lucien Barnes, a hardened mercenary soldier, are caught up in this conflict. Both are transformed by mystical pages of the Mineans and Dayaks: Andromeda becomes a blue-skinned empath, and Lucien grows wings and gains super-strength, enhanced speed, and the ability to teleport, becoming gargoyle-like. The protagonists befriend Petra, the heir to the Minean throne. The protagonists are usually allied to the generally peaceable Mineans and are usually enemies of the aggressive Dayaks.

=== Story arcs ===
There were four major story arcs in the series:

- #0, 1/2, 1-6 (October 1997-May 1998): Andromeda and Lucien battle Voivodul, the evil Dayak sorcerer who attains god-like power.
- #7-12 (July 1998-April 1999): Andromeda and Lucien battle the chief disciple of Voivodul, Grigorieff, a human who is creating mutant beast-like Dayaks. This story places Ascension within the canon Top Cow universe, with the arc featuring Witchblade villains such as Kenneth Irons and Gavin Taylor.
- #13-19 (May–October 1999): Andromeda and Lucien battle Rowina, Petra's evil mother.
- #20-22 (November 1999-March 2000): Andromeda and Lucien battle General Caladon or Lord Shroud, an undead servant of Voivodul, and Shroud's army of orc undead.

== Collected editions ==
The series has never been collected into trade paperbacks, though there have been reprints of some of the early stories:

- Ascension Collected Editions #1-2 (prestige format comic books, collects Ascension #1-4, Top Cow, May–July, 1998)
- Top Cow's Best of Dave Finch (includes Ascension #0-1, 240 pages, September 2006, ISBN 1-58240-638-3)
