= The Last Resort (comics) =

The Last Resort is a 5 issue limited-series from IDW Publishing by writers Justin Gray and Jimmy Palmiotti with art by Giancarlo Caracuzzo in 2009. The series was collected in a trade paperback in 2010.

== Plot ==
A planeful of passengers who have crash-landed on a tropical island on which a biological disaster has given rise to a deadly infestation.

== Collected editions ==
- Back To Brooklyn Volume 1 (120pages, paperback, March, 2010, ISBN 1600106153)
