= Monolith (comics) =

The Monolith

Publication information
- Publisher: PaperFilms
- Schedule: Monthly
- Publication date: April 2004 - March 2005
- No. of issues: 12

Creative team
- Written by: Justin Gray; Jimmy Palmiotti
- Artist(s): Phil Winslade; Tomm Coker; Peter Snejbjerg

The Monolith is a DC Comics comic book series whose title character is a superheroic golem. The Monolith is guided in his actions by Alice Cohen, a recovering drug addict whose grandmother was one of those responsible for the Monolith's creation in the 1930s.

In 2013, the publication rights reverted to the creators, Jimmy Palmiotti and Justin Gray of PaperFilms Inc.

== Publication history ==
The Monolith was published for a total of 12 issues before being cancelled due to poor sales. The issues were cover dated April 2004 to March 2005, and were all written by Justin Gray and Jimmy Palmiotti. Phil Winslade was the penciller/inker for most issues with Tomm Coker and Peter Snejbjerg acting as replacements for a total of four issues.

The stories take place in the present (of the publication dates), with flashbacks to the events surrounding The Monolith during the Depression Era.

== Characters ==
=== 2004 ===
- Alice Cohen: The granddaughter of the first Alice. She finds herself struggling with drug addiction while trying to control the Monolith.
- Tilt Shimura: Alice's best friend and roommate. An ex-prostitute, she is the less mature of the two. Nevertheless, she finds herself also responsible for the Monolith
- The Monolith: A golem created in the 1930s. The creature viciously hunts those who prey on the innocent. He is psychically linked to Brooklyn and able to sense where crimes will happen. It has a very childlike personality which makes it both innocent and dangerous.

=== 1930s ===
- Alice: The grandmother to Alice Cohen. The Depression Era flashbacks are told from her point of view.
- Rabbi Rava: The individual who was in charge of the magic knowledge that was used to create The Monolith.
- Han: Chinese carpenter who participates in creating the Monolith.
- Peter: Bootlegger and love of Alice whose blood was used to help create the Monolith.

== Plot synopsis (issues #1-12) ==
=== Issues #1-3: Introduction ===
In the present the reader is introduced to Alice Cohen as she receives her inheritance from her recently deceased grandmother. This inheritance consists of a lone house in an area of Brooklyn where all the other buildings have been torn down. One of the first things that Alice discovers is a walled off section in the basement from which a voice calls to her to read stories. Alice's first choice for this is her grandmother's diary.

Alice owes money to Prince, a violent drug dealer who is determined to find and make an example out of her. Using violent methods Prince finds out Alice's location from Tilt (a friend of Alice's) who races to warn Alice that Prince is coming for her. Not long after Tilt's warning Prince arrives and breaks into the house. In desperation Alice and Tilt break down the brick wall in the basement and release The Monolith. The resulting fight is short.

The depression era portions of these issues show how and why The Monolith was created. Alice's grandmother (also named Alice) is a factory worker who rooms with others trying to get through those tough times. Her closest friends are Rabbi Rava, Han, and Peter.

The events leading to The Monolith's creation begin when the textile factory that Alice works in is firebombed by the Mafia. Peter, who also works on the side in organized crime, confronts those responsible and is murdered. Deciding that Peter's death should not be in vain Alice and her friends create a golem using knowledge Rabbi Rava has learned. Peter's blood is one of the ingredients used in its creation and as a result his personality is the basis for The Monolith's. They send their creation to hunt down those responsible for Peter's murder.

After a time The Monolith begins to hunt down and kill all criminals with no distinction made for the degree of their crime. Seeing their creation is out of control Alice, Rabbi Rava, and Han seal The Monolith in a bootlegger tunnel located beneath the house they live in.

=== Issues #4-5: Battle with a demon ===
In the present the lawyer overseeing Alice's grandmother's will gets her a job working for NYCAT (the New York Citizen's Assistance Team). NYCAT is a non-profit organization that helps lower income people in the New York area.

While Alice is dealing with her first day at this job, The Monolith leaves the house to seek out a demon that lies hidden beneath a church. This demon is named L'ono Nero and has remained in its place of hiding for decades. The Zavatinni family has been cursed all that time to guard and protect it. Giovanni Zavatinni (the current guardian) is seeking to rid himself of this curse and aides The Monolith in the fight against L'ono Nero.

In 1935 the Rocco Family is seeking revenge for the deaths of their fellow mobsters at the hands of The Monolith. Having learned the truth of its creation they seek out The Monolith's creators. Rabbi Rava is kidnapped, beaten and dropped off at the church that hides L'ono Nero. The mobsters tell the current guardian to give the Rabbi to L'ono Nero. The guardian doesn't do this but the Rabbi dies of his injuries anyway. Their brief conversation reveals that the Rocco Family has already killed Han. Alice is also taken to the church but is set free by the guardian

=== Issues #6-8: Batman ===
An arsonist calling himself the Incinerator begins to target the Arab-American and Muslim American community of New York City. His first target is a home for recent Arab Muslim immigrants in Bedford-Stuyvesant that was built through the efforts of NYCAT and the Wayne Foundation. This event gets the attention of Batman and he begins to investigate.

Both Batman and The Monolith track the Incinerator to his next target. In the resulting fight Batman is injured and The Monolith brings him back to the house. There Alice tells Batman the Monolith's origin. Batman's reaction is to tell Alice and The Monolith not to get in his way.

After a time Batman comes to the realization that he needs The Monolith to find The Incinerator. The two of them locate The Incinerator's next bomb in the New York Mosque where he has tied an Imam to the bomb to make it harder to disarm. After dealing with the bomb both The Monolith and Batman track The Incinerator to the World Trade Center site. The Incinerator is planning to blow himself up but is stopped and arrested for his crimes.

=== Issues #9-10: Iron golem ===
In 1934 mobsters kidnap Alice and Rabbi Rava. The Rabbi is forced to create a golem made of iron for these mobsters after they threaten to kill Alice if he doesn't. Rabbi Rava performs the ceremony but purposely misspeaks the words. The golem awakens anyway, but is nearly mindless and kills the mobsters.

It is at this point that The Monolith arrives to rescue his creators. During the fight the iron golem is covered in molten steel and frozen when the steel hardens. It is then thrown into the East River by The Monolith. In 1987 the iron golem is found by scuba diving salvagers and sold.

In the present Tilt has just been diagnosed as being HIV positive. Alice takes her to a dance club to take her mind off of this. In the middle of this club is a statue that is actually the iron golem still encased in its steel prison. When a gang fight starts in the club, blood is spilled on the iron golem, causing it to awaken. During its resulting rampage The Monolith arrives to protect Alice and Tilt.

=== Issues #11-12: The end ===
Alice gets a call from a woman NYCAT helped into a woman's shelter saying that the shelter isn't a shelter. This call leads Alice to a modern slave ring headed by a group of corrupt police officers. The leader of this group turns out to be Orlando Ruiz (a man Alice has just started to date) who captures Alice. Ruiz injects Alice with heroin to keep her compliant and puts her on the slave block.

Knowing that Alice is in trouble Tilt and the Monolith track her to the warehouse where she and the other women are being held. They rescue Alice and bring her back to the house to recover.

The final pages of issue twelve show Alice, Tilt and the Monolith celebrating Christmas. They engage in a snowball fight and then go back inside the house. The series ends with The Monolith remembering who he was in life and saying "My name was Peter".

== Other appearances ==
While The Monolith was still being published, Gray and Palmiotti were also writing Hawkman. In issue #33 of that series, the Monolith and Alice guest starred in a story featuring the Monolith joining with Hawkman and Hawkgirl to defeat Solomon Grundy.

In 2006 in Crisis Aftermath: The Battle for Blüdhaven, one of the One Year Later titles, the Monolith is shown protecting the innocent in refugee camps that spring up around Blüdhaven after that city's destruction in Infinite Crisis.

In 2019, Monolith, Alice and Tilt were used in PaperFilm's graphic novel Painkiller Jane: Trust The Universe, where they team up to rescue a friend's little sister from a human trafficking ring.

== Film adaptation ==
A film adaptation of Monolith by Lionsgate was in development since August 2016, with visual effects director Dave Wilson attached as director.
