= Phil Winslade =

British comic book artist

- Born: 1965 (age 60–61) Surrey, England, UK
- Areas: Penciller, Inker

Phil Winslade (born 1965) is a British comic book artist.

== Biography ==
Winslade was born in Surrey in 1965 and spent a lot of time indoors as a child because of a heart murmur. His main source of entertainment were Marvel Comics such as Howard the Duck and Deathlok. After he attended Birmingham Polytechnic, to study art, he had the idea of working in the comics industry. Here he met Steve Pugh who was already active in comic art.

He produced commercial artwork after college before showing his portfolio to Garth Ennis at a comic convention in Coventry, where he got the job drawing Goddess. Before that project started he worked on Crisis and Revolver as well as inking Steve Dillon's work on Car Warriors for Epic. During this period he also worked on Elaine Lee's Skin Tight Orbit and was pencilled in as the artist for The Red Seas, with writer Ian Edginton, when it was going to be run by Epic, but he was too busy with Goddess.

Since then he has worked for Marvel, DC and 2000 AD.

== Awards ==
His work has won him a 1997 National Cartoonists Society nomination for Best Comic Book.

He was nominated for the 1996 "Best Cover Artist" and "Best Painter" Eisner Award for his work on Vertigo's Goddess and Vamps: Hollywood & Vein.

== Bibliography ==
Comics work includes:

- "Nine Inches to the Mile" (with Igor Goldkind, in Revolver #1, 1990)
- Car Warriors (inks, with writer Chuck Dixon and pencils by Steve Dillon, 4-issue mini-series, Epic Comics, June–September 1991)
- "Dada 331" (with Warren Ellis, in A1 #6, Atomeka Press, April 1992)
- "Harlequin Bones: Kil 4/11/44" (with Warren Ellis, in Ammo Armegddon, anthology graphic novel, Atomeka Press, 1993)
- Goddess (with Garth Ennis, Vertigo, 8-issue limited series, 1995, tpb, 2002 ISBN 1-56389-735-0)
- Skin Tight Orbit (with Elaine Lee, tpb, NBM Publishing, 1997 ISBN 1-56163-118-3)
- Nevada (with Steve Gerber; Steve Leialoha and Dick Giordano, Vertigo, 1998, tpb, 156 pages, 1999 ISBN 1-56389-518-8)
- Wonder Woman: Amazonia (with William Messner-Loebs and Paul Kupperberg, DC, ISBN 0-606-22070-4)
- Ant-Man's Big Christmas (with Bob Gale), Marvel, Feb 2000
- Daredevil/Spider-Man (with Paul Jenkins and Tom Palmer, Marvel, 96 pages, 2001 ISBN 0-7851-0792-4)
- Howard the Duck (with Steve Gerber, MAX, 144 pages, 2002 ISBN 0-7851-0931-5)
- The Flash: Blitz (with Geoff Johns, DC, tpb, collects The Flash #192-200, 2004 ISBN 1-84023-986-7)
- Tharg's Terror Tales: "Frozen Stiffs" (with Steve Moore, in 2000 AD #1374, 2004)
- Monolith (with Jimmy Palmiotti, DC Comics, 2004–2005)
- Judge Dredd: "Caught in the Act" (with John Wagner, in 2000 AD #1450-1451, 2005)
- Aquaman: Sword of Atlantis #46-47 (with Kurt Busiek, DC Comics, 2006–2007)
- The Helmet of Fate: Ibis the Invincible (with Tad Williams, one-shot, DC Comics, 2007)
- Legends of the Dark Knight: #214: "Superstitious and Cowardly" (with Christos Gage, DC Comics, 2007)
- Shadowpact #19, 22-25 (with Lilah Sturges, DC Comics, January–July 2008)
- The Brave and the Bold #17-18 (with Marv Wolfman, DC Comics, November–December 2008)
- Jonah Hex #56 (with Justin Gray/Jimmy Palmiotti, DC Comics, August 2010)
