= The Resistance (WildStorm) =

Comic book series

- Cover of the first issue

Publication information
- Publisher: Wildstorm
- Schedule: Monthly
- Format: Limited series
- Genre: Cyberpunk, post-apocalyptic
- Publication date: November 2002 - June 2003
- No. of issues: 8

Creative team
- Written by: Justin Gray, Jimmy Palmiotti
- Artist: Juan Santacruz

The Resistance was a post-apocalyptic cyberpunk comic book limited series written and created by Justin Gray and Jimmy Palmiotti with art by Juan Santacruz. Totaling 8 issues, the series was published by Wildstorm, with issue #1 being cover dated November 2002. It is unrelated to and should not be confused with the later similarly named Wildstorm series Resistance. The collected edition was published by IDW in APRIL 2009 collecting all 8 issues that were first published in 2002.

== Setting ==
The setting is a dystopic New York City in the year 2280. A chemical known as "Toxin 5" has ruined the world's ecosystem, bringing civilization close to collapse.

The Global Control Commission (GCC) has brought order to the chaos and anarchy, but it is also corrupt and oppressive to the point of totalitarianism. It is also very inegalitarian: all people over age 65 are denied medical treatment), and the government, in an effort to maintain the delicate balance between a growing population and dwindling food supplies, regulates childbirth rates in the few remaining cities. People born without authorization are known as "Strayz" and are given no civil rights by the GCC; they may be hunted down and killed by corporate-sponsored machines.

== Characters ==
The protagonist is a young genius hacker Stray named Brian Sturm who joins "the Resistance," a group of mostly Strayz who have rebelled against the GCC. The Resistance is led by a man named Surge.
