= Batwing (DC Comics) =

Fictional superhero in DC Comics

- Textless cover of Batwing #30 art by Dan Panosian

Publication information
- Publisher: DC Comics
- First appearance: David Zavimbe: Batman Incorporated #5 (May 2011); Luke Fox: Batwing #19 (June 2013)
- Created by: David Zavimbe: Grant Morrison (writer); Chris Burnham (artist); Luke Fox: Jimmy Palmiotti (writer); Justin Gray (writer); Eduardo Pansica (artist)

In-story information
- Alter ego: David Zavimbe; Lucas "Luke" Fox
- Species: Human
- Place of origin: Congo, Africa (David Zavimbe); Gotham City (Luke Fox)
- Team affiliations: Batman Family; Batman Incorporated
- Partnerships: Batman
- Abilities: Specially designed combat suit ("Batwing Suit") contains a vast array of high-tech offensive weapons, defensive abilities, and gadgetry.
Batwing
- Cover for Batwing #1 (September 2011). Art by Ben Oliver & Brian Reber
Publication information
- Schedule: Monthly
- Format: Ongoing series
- Genre: Superhero
- Publication date: September 2011 – August 2014
- No. of issues: 34
Creative team
- Written by: List: Judd Winick (#1–14) Fabian Nicieza (#15–18) Jimmy Palmiotti and Justin Gray (#19–34)
- Penciller: List: Ben Oliver (#1–3, 5–6) ChrisCross (#4) Dustin Nguyen (#7–8) Marcus To (#9–14) Fabrizio Fiorentino (#15–18) Eduardo Pansica (#19–34)
- Inkers: List: Derek Fridolfs; Ryan Winn; Julio Ferreira
- Colorists: List: Brian Reber; Pete Pantazis; Paul Mounts

Batwing is the alias used by several characters in American comic books published by DC Comics. Both versions of the character are superheroes inspired by Batman notable for their technological capabilities. The first Batwing is David Zavimbe, a Congolese police officer created by writer Grant Morrison and debuting in Batman Incorporated #5 in May, 2011 before headlining his own Batwing comic series. This version of Batwing acts as one of representatives of Africa within Batman Incorporated, being known as the "Batman of Africa".

The second Batwing, Lucas "Luke" Fox, is an African-American mixed martial artist and genius who is the son of Lucius Fox, one of Batman's closest associates. After David retires from the role, Batman offers the Batwing role to Luke, who is eager to accept despite protest from his father.

The Luke Fox version of the character has appeared in the Arrowverse TV series Batwoman as part of the main cast, portrayed by Camrus Johnson. He takes on the mantle of Batwing at the end of the second season.

== Publication history ==
The character proper appears first in "Batman of Africa", in Batman Incorporated #5 (May 2011), written by Grant Morrison. He was designed by Chris Burnham, but was first drawn by Yanick Paquette. Batwing has since gained his own monthly ongoing series as part of the 2011 DC Universe reboot, featuring art by Ben Oliver and written by Power Girl and Justice League: Generation Lost writer Judd Winick.

According to fellow Batman Incorporated artists, Chris Burnham told iFanboy that he designed the character first, while Paquette was the first to draw him in interiors. In line with Morrison's use of obscure continuity throughout his Batman stories, the character seems to be based visually on a minor character which appeared in Batman #250 in a story called "The Batman Nobody Knows". In this story, a young African-American boy tells his friends how he imagines Batman to be, and gives him the name "Batwings".

Writing duo Justin Gray and Jimmy Palmiotti took over the book starting with Batwing #19 (June 2013), to introduce a new Batwing, Luke Fox, unrelated to the previous one. The new Batwing character would no longer be the "Batman of Africa", but be more international, along with having more ties to Gotham City.

== Fictional character biography ==
=== David Zavimbe ===
Cover to Batwing #10 by Marcus To.

David Zavimbe operates as Batwing who is a representative of Batman Incorporated from the city of Tinasha, within the Democratic Republic of Congo.

When David Zavimbe was a young boy in Tinasha, his parents died of HIV/AIDS very early in his life. Following the death of their parents, David, and his brother, Isaac, were taken from their orphanage and drafted as boy soldier prodigies, like many children his age, into General Keita's army known as the Army of the Dawn, for a war that ravaged his country. While many young boys were picked to join, the Zavimbe brothers shined above the rest with their ability to take orders and kill and garnered the name the Dragonflies. Due to their speed, dexterity, and prodigious ability to kill, General Keita promoted the boys into the ranks of his elite men.

On Keita's path to power and domination, he orders the brothers to kill Okuru, one of Keita's major enemies. They agree to sneak in and slit Okuru's throat, but Keita demands they torch the entire village to prevent any possible escape. Refusing to kill innocent women and children, Isaac shoots his gun in the air, giving Okuru and his squadron time to fire shots back, forcing Keita to retreat. The General cannot stand for any insubordination and while he is arguing with David, Isaac hits him over the head with a rock. Keita reaches for his machete and slices Isaac multiple times; all the while, David is sprinting away.

Later that night, David sneaks into Keita's room and drugs him before he can make a move. Eventually, Keita comes to be tied up in the back of an SUV. David says he will not kill any longer and drops Keita outside of Okuru's new encampment, while firing shots in the air to notify them.

After General Keita's death, David spends the next few days walking to the Children's Harbor, an orphanage for former child soldiers. David was able to escape the life of being a soldier at such a young age, and soon became a police officer in Tinasha, where despite corruption running rampant, he remained dedicated to the law and justice. Elsewhere in the United States, Bruce Wayne announces Batman Incorporated, an initiative to put Batman-like figures in countries all across the world. Soon after that, Batman pays a visit to Tinasha, where he inducts David as the newest member of his team in his quest to stop the global terrorists, Leviathan.

Shortly after finding the false Dr. Dedalus and coming into confrontation with Leviathan yet again, Batman travels to an unknown destination within the continent of Africa to recruit a new member to his team of Batmen, Batman Incorporated. Batman leads David through his first mission for Batman Incorporated, providing a technologically advanced bat-suit. David comes into contact with a Leviathan brain-washing cell, narrowly avoiding capture once his presence is compromised. During his escape, he demonstrated a knowledge of martial arts, also showing off special capabilities of his bat-suit including jet propulsion.

Batwing faces off against a new villain calling himself Massacre. As Massacre gets the upper hand in battle against Batwing, we see a flashback of Batwing stopping Blood Tiger, a former captain of a warlord and now in control of a drug ring. With the help of Batman he manages to capture him.

As his investigation continues, he comes upon a gruesome crime scene with beheaded bodies. Later, as he researches it with the police, he finds a room filled with murdered police officers and he gets stabbed in the back by Massacre as he looks shocked at the murdered officers. David attempts to fight back his attacker, but he quickly loses. Massacre attempts to finish David off, but is interrupted by Kia Okuru and other officers who fire shots at him. David passes out during the shootout and wakes up two weeks later in The Haven. He asks Matu to see about the shootout and the welfare of Kia Okuru. Matu informs him that Kia lives, but she had been badly beaten and the rest of the officers had been killed. David attempts to go after Massacre shortly after he awoke, but Matu urges him to remain in The Haven to heal up his injuries and regain his strength.

They both argue about it for a bit before Matu forces David to get back to bed. David soon knocks out Matu with a tranquilizer dart and goes after Massacre. He is able to deduce Massacre's location from something Massacre had said to him back at the police station. He arrives just in time to aid Thunder Fall of The Kingdom, who is engaged in a brutal battle with Massacre. Despite his injuries, Batwing, along with the help of a severely injured Thunder Fall manage to fight and then escape from Massacre to a nearby hospital where Thunder Fall reveals that The Kingdom, a super hero team which operated in Africa, had done something terrible and that Massacre was their punishment.

The final truth is revealed after the heroes rescue The Kingdom's tech-powered member, Steelback. He tells them that years ago, The Kingdom was fighting the ruthless dictator of Congo alongside the People's Army, which left him only with the capital city to defend. Intending on this to be a victory of the people, they left the army to go alone, but soon received a message saying the dictator has allied himself with the African crime lords, making it impossible to win even with The Kingdom's intervention. The heroes are forced to give amnesty to him and promise no retaliations after that. The crime lords fought anyway but without the dictator to support them, their army of child soldiers was slaughtered, and 50,000 people died in the battle. This tragedy led to The Kingdom's subsequent dissolution.

After the events of the bomb attack at the United Nations place outside, Booster Gold was saddened that the team had lost some of the JLI members who were hurt or killed. Massacre was later revealed to have been Batwing's older brother, who was brainwashed by X. After this, after Matu is injured in an attack on Batwing's home base, he decided that he would use lethal force in his protection of the Democratic Republic of Congo. Batwing was briefly a member in the JLI until the series came to an end with Justice League International Annual #1.

Batwing joined with the team calling themselves the Dead Heroes Club, an offshoot of Batman Inc.. The other members are Looker, Freight Train, The Hood, Gaucho, Wingman, and Halo.

=== Luke Fox ===
After the events of Batwing #19, David resigned as Batwing. Lucius Fox would then make a new Batwing suit, which Batman then gives to Fox's son Luke Fox. Luke plays a significant part in Batman Eternal when he helps Jim Corrigan investigate recent events in Arkham Asylum, where the Joker's Daughter is using the spirits of the inmates to resurrect what she believes to be the Joker in the body of Maxie Zeus (although it is revealed to be Deacon Blackfire). In Batgirl #45, Luke Fox began a romantic relationship with Barbara Gordon, also fighting crime together as their alter egos Batwing and Batgirl. Luke Fox was created by Jimmy Palmiotti and Justin Gray, the writers of Batwing #19 in April, 2013.

In 2016, DC Comics implemented another relaunch of its books called "DC Rebirth", which restored its continuity to a form much as it was prior to "The New 52". Following Red Robin's apparent sacrifice, Luke is recruited to the team that Batman and Batwoman set up.

== Abilities and resources ==
=== David Zavimbe's abilities ===
Batwing has shown a knowledge of martial arts and is supplied by Batman with a variety of gadgets, weapons and tech to help him fight crime and corruption. He is also very well trained without any weapon in his hands, which makes him one of the biggest threats in the Batman universe. His batsuit is armored and is capable of regeneration abilities, and adaptation skills with the help of wings allowing him to fly or glide. Because he works as a police officer it is implied that he received basic police training with the genius detective Bruce Wayne assisting him along the way.

=== Luke Fox's abilities ===
Possessing intelligence and business skills and sense like his father, Luke is a technological genius, inventor, designer, and engineer. He is also a trained mixed martial artist and boxer whose skills have since improved under tutelage from Batman. In addition to his skills, the character possess immense wealth and his connections garner nearly unlimited access to Wayne Industries' advance technology. With the Batwing suit, Luke possess a vast array of offensive and defensive capabilities, including flight, invisibility, enhanced strength, ability to pinpoint and neutralize electronic signals, and pores in the fingertips that can exude a sedative mist of his own design.

== Other versions ==
- David Zavimbe is featured in the Smallville Season 11 digital comic based on the TV series. In this continuity, David is an ally of Lana Lang, who supplies her with information for her vigilante activities in Africa.

== In other media ==
=== Television ===
Luke Fox appears in media set in the Arrowverse, portrayed by Camrus Johnson.

- First appearing in the TV series Batwoman, this version watches over Wayne Tower following Batman's disappearance three years prior. After meeting and befriending Batman's cousin, Kate Kane, Luke assists her in crime-fighting via his technical knowledge and skill in gadgetry throughout the first season until she also disappears. In the second season, Luke assists Kane's successor Ryan Wilder until he is shot by a corrupt Crows agent and left in a coma. After seeing a vision of Bruce Wayne, he awakens and eventually becomes Batwing to help Ryan defeat Black Mask and save Kate from him.
- An alternate reality version of Luke from Earth-99 makes a minor appearance in the crossover event "Crisis on Infinite Earths". This version works for an aged Bruce Wayne.

=== Film ===
- The Luke Fox incarnation of Batwing appears in Batman: Bad Blood, voiced by Gaius Charles.
- The Luke Fox incarnation of Batwing makes a non-speaking appearance in Justice League Dark: Apokolips War.
- The Luke Fox incarnation of Batwing makes a non-speaking appearance in Justice League: Crisis on Infinite Earths.

=== Video games ===
- The Luke Fox incarnation of Batwing appears in DC Universe Online.
- A young Luke Fox appears in a photograph depicted in Batman: The Telltale Series.

=== Miscellaneous ===
The Luke Fox incarnation of Batwing appears in Catwoman: Soulstealer, written by Sarah J. Maas as part of the DC Icons series of novels.

== Collected editions ==
Title	Material collected	Published date	ISBN
David Zavimbe
Batwing Vol. 1: The Lost Kingdom	Batwing #1–6	July 2012	978-1401234768
Batwing Vol. 2: In the Shadow of the Ancients	Batwing #0, 7–12	April 2013	978-1401237912
Batwing Vol. 3: Enemy of the State	Batwing #13–18	February 2014	978-1401244033
Luke Fox
Batwing Vol. 4: Welcome to the Family	Batwing #19–26	August 2014	978-1401246310
Batwing Vol. 5: Into the Dark	Batwing #27–34, Batwing: Future's End #1	March 2015	978-1401250812
Batwing: Luke Fox	Batwing #19–34, Batwing: Future's End #1	February 2022	978-1779514202

An omnibus collecting the entire series was solicited, but later cancelled and replaced with Batwing: Luke Fox.
