= Jimmy Palmiotti =

American writer (born 1961)

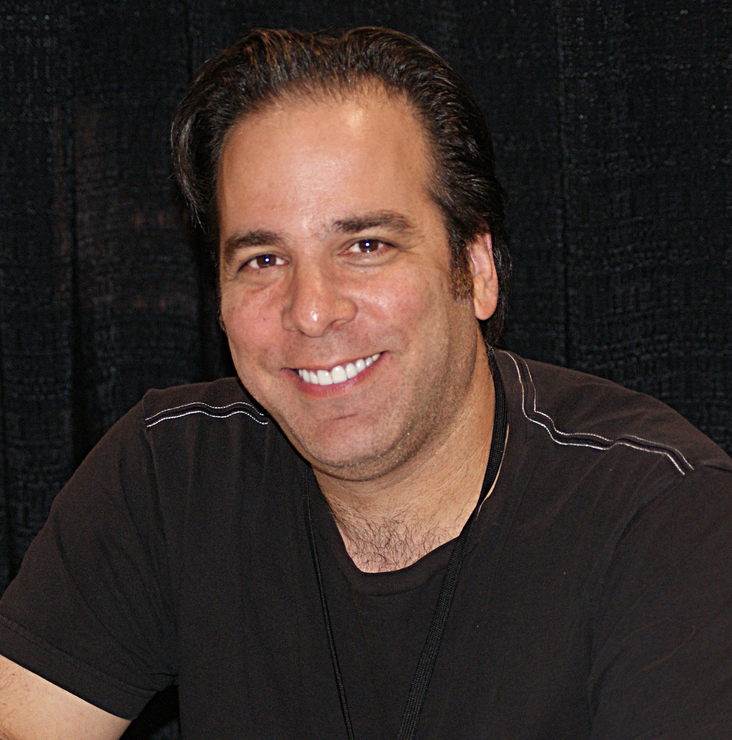
- Palmiotti in June 2011
- Born: James Palmiotti; August 14, 1961 (age 65)
- Areas: Writer, Inker
- Awards: Inkpot Award (2014)
- Spouse: Amanda Conner

James Palmiotti (born August 14, 1961) is an American writer and inker of comic books, who also does writing for games, television and film.

== Early life ==
Palmiotti attended the High School of Art and Design in New York City.

== Career ==
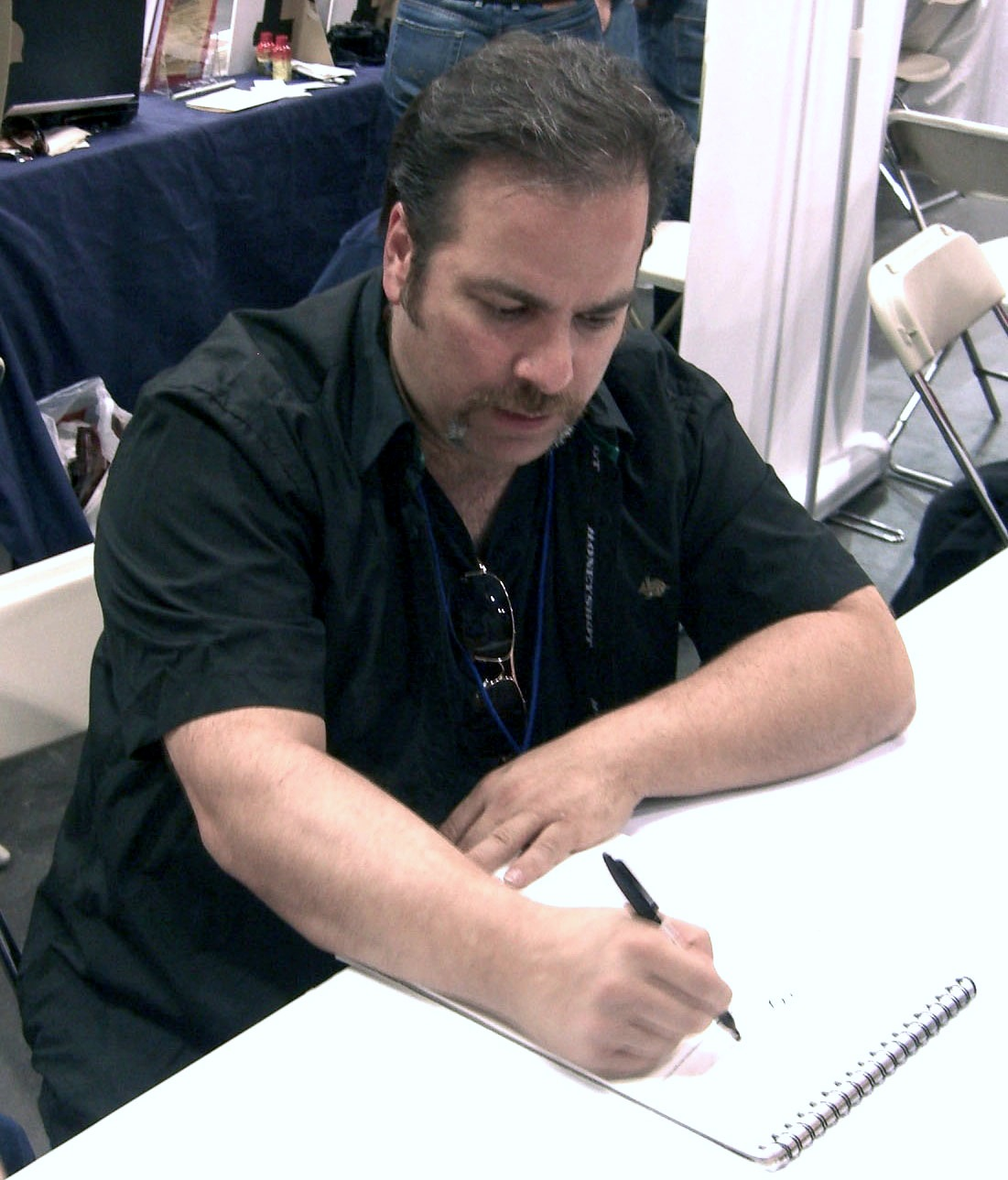
Palmiotti sketching at the New York Comic Con, October 10, 2010

Palmiotti started at Marvel Comics in 1991. He inked titles such as the Punisher, Ghost Rider, The Nam and the Marvel 2099 line, and has accumulated extensive inking and writing credits. He often inked the work of his friend and collaborator Joe Quesada. Together, they created Ash and Painkiller Jane.

For Marvel, Palmiotti worked on the established Daredevil, a run especially known for the "Guardian Devil" arc scripted by Kevin Smith.

Palmiotti also worked for Dark Horse Comics, as the inker during the Doug Mahnke run on X. He inked Paul Gulacy on Shang-Chi: Master of Kung Fu, Punisher and Catwoman. He inked Steve Dillon on Punisher, as well as Brad Walker's pencil's on the DC Comics miniseries Secret Six - Six Degrees of Separation.

In 1994, Palmiotti and Quesada formed a publishing company, Event Comics, and co-created Ash, a firefighter with superpowers, Painkiller Jane, a female cop with healing powers, Kid Death and Fluffy, about a boy and his pet robot dog and 22 Brides, about a group of girls that run the New York underworld. In 1998, Event Comics was contracted to do several books for Marvel Comics, dubbed Marvel Knights.

The Marvel Knights line have influenced subsequent Marvel television and movie adaptation, including Netflix's Daredevil and Black Panther feature film. Christopher Priest attributed the Dora Milaje to both Joe Quesada and Jimmy Palmiotti.

As a writer, Palmiotti is known for Deadpool, Daughters of the Dragon, the Punisher, Heroes for Hire and Shanna the She-Devil for Marvel Comics, Hawkman, Superboy and The Monolith for DC Comics, as well as 21 Down, The Resistance and The Twilight Experiment for their Wildstorm imprint (often in tandem with fellow writer Justin Gray). Palmiotti also co-scripted, with Garth Ennis, a Ghost Rider video game that ties in with the movie. He has also penned Supergirl #12, the two Uncle Sam and the Freedom Fighters miniseries and an arc for Superman Confidential. Palmiotti and Gray were also part of the writing team for DC's Countdown. Currently, along with Gray, Palmiotti is writing the monthly Jonah Hex and G.I. Combat for DC Comics, as well as the miniseries Time Bomb for Radical Publishing.

Palmiotti has also worked on Beautiful Killer, Gatecrasher, Tempest, Civil Warrior and has currently being shopped Death Troupe and Triggergirl 6. Palmiotti recently co-wrote with Justin Gray The Hills Have Eyes: The Beginning for Fox Atomic Comics.

He worked on the Painkiller Jane series for the Sci-Fi Channel starring Kristanna Loken. This was a one-hour, 22 episode show. There was also a two-hour Painkiller Jane movie done for Sci-Fi as well. In the past he has written and storyboarded films for Hooptown for Nike. They featured LeBron James and Vince Carter.

He is also known as an editor for many projects and books with companies ranging from Marvel Comics, Fox Atomic, Blackbull Comics and Kickstart Comics. He is also a partner in two comic book companies. Blackbull Press, Event Comics and founding partner of Paperfilms.

In July 2010 he started recording Listen to Jimmy, a podcast with "Monster Mike" Campbell of the Canadian comic book and pop culture radio show Where Monsters Dwell. Listen to Jimmy follows an open format where Campbell and Palmiotti discuss any topics that they deem relevant that week. Campbell also asks Palmiotti questions that are sent in by listeners through email, Twitter, and Facebook. The podcast is available for download at the Where Monsters Dwell site and through iTunes.

In June 2013, Palmiotti was the keynote speaker for the 2013 Inkwell Awards Awards Ceremony at HeroesCon in Charlotte, North Carolina.

In 2013, DC Comics tapped Amanda Conner and Jimmy Palmiotti to relaunch the Harley Quinn series. The 30 issue series would consistently be a top seller at DC creating a large fan base and sparking numerous cosplay variants of the character at conventions. This title ran for 3 years before being relaunched with the same creative team in 2016 with the Rebirth line. The first issue of the Rebirth line in August 2016 sold nearly 400,000 copies, representing the largest selling issue of all comics in that month. The title continues to be a consistent top seller at most retail stores. Jimmy was a key contributor to the revitalization of Harley Quinn at DC Comics. Along with Amanda Conner, they wrote the Harley Quinn character for over 100 different issues of the character returned Harley Quinn to the spotlight. Their work championed the popularity of the character again. Their stories, characters, designs and concepts heavily influenced the look and feel of the character, merchandising and her rise into both the theatrical and mainstream media/audience again.

In 2015, DC Comics launched a new Starfire series with Amanda Conner. The series lasted 13 issues.

In 2016, Palmiotti joined actress Kristanna Loken and Jonathan Bates in forming TRIOentertainment, a company designed to offer an array of films, intellectual properties, and original projects for theatrical, television, and home entertainment. The team has several properties in various stages of development.

In 2016, his character Monolith was optioned by Lionsgate for development.

In 2016, his character Painkiller Jane was optioned for movie development by Jessica Chastain and her production studio, Freckle Films and Lotus Entertainment and Solipsist Films. Chastain is set to star in the lead role of the character and film.

In 2017, The Pro, which Palmiotti created with (by Garth Ennis, Amanda Conner and him) was optioned by Paramount Pictures where Erwin Stoff of 3 Arts is producing and Zoe McCarthy has been hired to write the screenplay.

In 2019, his character creation, Luke Fox, for the Batwing series that he and Justin Gray created for DC Comics (in April 2013) was featured as a major character on the CW Batwoman TV series.

== Personal life ==
Palmiotti is married to frequent collaborator Amanda Conner.

== Bibliography ==
=== Comics scripting ===
- Painkiller Jane:
  - 22 Brides #1-4 (Mar. 1996 - Jan. 1997)
  - Painkiller Jane #0-5 (Jan. - Nov. 1997) (#0 printed in Jan. 1999)
  - Painkiller Jane vol. 2, #1-3 (Mar. - Aug. 2006)
  - Painkiller Jane vol. 3, #0-5 (Apr. 2007 - Mar. 2008)
  - Painkiller Jane: The Price of Freedom #1-4 (Nov. 2013 - Jan. 2014)
  - Painkiller Jane: The 22 Brides #1-3 (May - Oct. 2014)
- Venom: Sinner Takes All (inks, 1995)
- The Pro (inks, written by Garth Ennis, penciled by Amanda Conner, graphic novel, Image Comics, 2002)
- The Resistance (with co-author Justin Gray and art by Juan Santacruz, 8-issue limited series, Wildstorm, November 2002 - June 2003, tpb, 192 pages, IDW Publishing, April 2009, ISBN 1-60010-407-X)
- 21 Down (with co-author Justin Gray and art by Jesus Saiz, 12-issue limited series, Wildstorm, November 2002 - November 2003, tpb collects #1-7, 176 pages, November 2003, ISBN 1-4012-0120-2)
- Cloudburst (with co-author Justin Gray and art by Eliseu Gouveia/Christopher Shy, 64 page graphic novel, Image Comics, January 2004)
- Monolith (with co-author Justin Gray and art by Phil Winslade, 12-issue limited series, DC Comics, April 2004 - March 2005)
- Jonah Hex (with Justin Gray, ongoing series, DC Comics, January 2006 - August 2011) collected as:
  - Face Full of Violence (with art by Luke Ross, and Tony DeZuniga, 144 pages, collects Jonah Hex #1-6, Titan Books, December 2006, ISBN 1-84576-408-0, DC, September 2006, ISBN 1-4012-1095-3)
  - Guns of Vengeance (with art by Luke Ross, Dylan Teague, Tony Dezuniga, Phil Noto, David Michael Beck, Paul Gulacy, Jimmy Palmiotti, Giuseppe Camuncoli, and Art Thibert, 144 pages, collects Jonah Hex #7-12, April 2007, ISBN 1-4012-1249-2)
  - Origins (with art by Jordi Bernet, Phil Noto, and Val Semeiks, 144 pages, collects Jonah Hex #13-18, November 2007, ISBN 1-4012-1490-8)
  - Only the Good Die Young (with art by Jordi Bernet, Phil Noto, and David Michael Beck, 144 pages, collects Jonah Hex #19-24, April 2008, ISBN 1-4012-1689-7)
  - Luck Runs Out (with art by Russ Heath, Giuseppe Camuncoli, Jordi Bernet, John Higgins, Stefano Landini, and Rafa Garres, 144 pages, collects Jonah Hex #25-30, October 2008, ISBN 1-4012-1960-8)
  - Bullets Don't Lie (with art by Darwyn Cooke, J. H. Williams III, Jordi Bernet, Rafa Garres, Paulo Siqueira, and Mark Sparacio, 144 pages, collects Jonah Hex #31-36, April 2009, ISBN 1-4012-2157-2)
  - Lead Poisoning (with art by Jordi Bernet and David Michael Beck, 144 pages, collects Jonah Hex #37-42, October 2009, ISBN 1-4012-2485-7)
  - Six Gun War (with art by Cristiana Cucina, 144 pages, collects Jonah Hex #44-49, April 2010, ISBN 1-4012-2587-X)
  - Counting Corpses (with art by Darwyn Cooke, Dick Giordano, Jordi Bernet, Paul Gulacy and Billy Tucci, 160 pages; collects Jonah Hex #43 and 50–54, October 2010, ISBN 1-4012-2899-2)
- Uncle Sam and the Freedom Fighters (with co-author Justin Gray, 8-issue limited series, DC Comics, September 2006 - April 2007, tpb, July 2007, ISBN 1-4012-1336-7)
- Uncle Sam and the Freedom Fighters: Brave New World (with co-author Justin Gray, 8-issue limited series, DC Comics, November 2007 - June 2008, tpb, September 2008, ISBN 1-4012-1954-3)
- The Hills Have Eyes: The Beginning (with co-author Justin Gray and art by John Higgins, graphic novel, Fox Atomic Comics, 2007, ISBN 978-0-06-124354-7)
- Gatecrasher (with Mark Waid and Amanda Conner, Black Bull Comics)
- Back to Brooklyn (with co-author Garth Ennis and art by Mihailo Vukelic, 5-issue limited series, Image Comics, September 2008 - May 2009, tpb, 128 pages, July 2009, ISBN 1-60706-060-4)
- Terra (with co-author Justin Gray and art by Amanda Conner, 4-issue miniseries, DC Comics, January–February 2009, collected as Terra with Supergirl #12, 128 pages, December 2009, ISBN 1-4012-2510-1)
- Power Girl (with co-author Justin Gray and art by Amanda Conner, ongoing series, DC Comics, July 2009 - May 2010) collected as:
  - Volume 1: Power Girl: A New Beginning (April 2010, ISBN 1-4012-2618-3)
  - Volume 2: Aliens & Apes (October 2010, ISBN 1-4012-2910-7)
  - Power Trip (February 2014, ISBN 1-4012-4307-X)
- The Last Resort (with co-author Justin Gray and art by Giancarlo Caracuzzo, 120 page graphic novel, IDW Publishing, March 2010, ISBN 1-60010-615-3)
- Random Acts of Violence (with co-author Justin Gray and art by Giancarlo Caracuzzo, 72 page graphic novel, Image Comics, April 2010, ISBN 1-60706-264-X)
- Jonah Hex: No Way Back (written by Justin Gray and Jimmy Palmiotti and art by Tony DeZuniga, 136 page graphic novel, DC Comics, June 2010, ISBN 1-4012-2550-0)
- Jonah Hex and Yosemite Sam (written by Jimmy Palmiotti and art by Mark Texiera, one shot, DC Comics June 2017)
- All-Star Western (written with Justin Gray, art by various), collected as:
  - Guns and Gotham (192 pages, DC Comics, November 2012, ISBN 978-1-4012-3709-7)
  - The War of Lords and Owls (192 pages, DC Comics, March 2013, ISBN 978-1-4012-3851-3)
  - The Black Diamond Probability (224 pages, DC Comics, November 2013, ISBN 978-1-4012-4399-9)
  - Gold Standard (176 pages, DC Comics, May 2014, ISBN 978-1-4012-4626-6)
  - Man Out of Time (192 pages, DC Comics, November 2014, ISBN 978-1-4012-4993-9)
  - End of the Train (144 pages, DC Comics, May 2015, ISBN 978-1-4012-5413-1)
- What If: Avengers vs X-Men(art by Jorge Molina, Marvel Comics, October 2013, ISBN 0-7851-8394-9)
- Batwing with co-author Justin Gray, an ongoing series.
- Daredevil: Dark Nights A three-issue miniseries for Marvel Comics
- Queen Crab (comics) (art by Artiz Eiguren, 64 page graphic novel, Image Comics, March 2012, ISBN 1-60706-505-3)
- Triggergirl 6 (written by Jimmy Palmiotti and Justin Gray with art by Phil Noto, Image Comics)
- Retrovirus (written by Justin Gray and Jimmy Palmiotti and art by Norberto Fernandez, 64 page graphic novel, Image Comics, December 2012, ISBN 1-60706-640-8)
- Weapon of God (written by Justin Gray and Jimmy Palmiotti and art by Giancarlo Caracuzzo, 71 page graphic novel, PaperFilms, September 2013)
- Forager (written by Justin Gray and Jimmy Palmiotti and art by Steven Cummings, 76 page graphic novel, PaperFilms, February 2014)
- Denver (written by Justin Gray and Jimmy Palmiotti and art by Pier Brito, 94 page graphic novel, PaperFilms, July 2014)
- Abbadon (written by Jimmy Palmiotti and Justin Gray; art by Fabrizio Fiorentino & Alessia Nocera (PaperFilms and Adaptive Studios, 2016))
- Sex & Violence, Volumes 1 and 2 (written by Jimmy Palmiotti and Justin Gray; art by Juan Santa Cruz, Jimmy Broxton, Vanessa Del Rey, Romina Moranelli and Rafa Garres, PaperFilms 2013, 2014)
- The Big Con Job (written by Jimmy Palmiotti and Matt Brady; Boom Comics, July 2016, ISBN 978-1-60886-850-6)
- GI Zombie (written by Jimmy Palmiotti and Justin Gray; art by Scott Hampton; DC Comics, 176 pages, September 2015 ISBN 978-1-4012-5487-2)
- Wool (written by Hugh Howey, Jimmy Palmiotti, and Justin Gray and art by Jimmy Broxton, 160 page comic adaptation, Jet City Comics, August 2014, ISBN 1-4778-4912-2)
- Starfire (written with Amanda Conner, DC Comics, 2015 - 2016), collected as:
  - Welcome Home (March 2016, 160 pages, ISBN 978-1-4012-6160-3)
  - A Matter of Time (January 2017, 144 pages, ISBN 978-1-4012-7038-4)
- Harley Quinn (with Amanda Conner, DC Comics, November 2013 - 2016) collected as:
  - Hot in the City (with art by Amanda Conner, Becky Cloonan, Tony S. Daniel, Sandu Florea, Stephane Roux, Dan Panosian, Walter Simonson, Jim Lee, Scott Williams, Bruce Timm, Charlie Adlard, Adam Hughes, Art Baltazar, Tradd Moore, Dave Johnson, Jeremy Roberts, Sam Kieth, Darwyn Cooke, 224 pages, collects Harley Quinn #0-8, DC Comics, October 2014, ISBN 1-4012-4892-6)
- Harley Quinn (with Amanda Conner, DC Comics, November 2016 - ) collected as:
  - Hot in the City (with art by John Timms and Chad Hardin; 168 pages, collects Harley Quinn #1-7, DC Comics, March 2017, ISBN 978-1-4012-6831-2)
  - Joker Loves Harley (with art by John Timms and Chad Hardin; 144 pages, collects Harley Quinn #8-13, DC Comics, June 2017, ISBN 978-1-4012-7095-7)
- Harley Quinn Little Black Book (with Amanda Conner, art by various DC Comics, 2015 - 2017)
- Harley Quinn and her Gang of Harleys (with Frank Tieri, DC Comics, 2016)
  - Harley Quinn and her Gang of Harleys (with art by Mauricet; 176 pages, collects Harley Quinn and her Gang of Harleys #1-6, DC Comics, February 2017, ISBN 978-1-4012-6785-8)

=== Screenwriting ===
Short Animation Scripts, Next generation writers Hire a writer

- Painkiller Jane for SyFy and Starz. Creator, writer and script consultant on 22 one-hour episodes.
- Dead Space: Downfall: script writer with Justin Gray for EA and Starz.
- Speed Racer: The Next Generation: The Beginning. Pilot movie DVD, 2008. Writer with Justin Gray for Lions Gate Entertainment and the Animation Collective.
- Ballerina: A script adaption of a story by Jimmy Palmiotti and Justin Gray- screenplay by Christos Gage and Ruth Gage, 2005.
- Superhero Squad: Planet Hulk. Script for animated show. Marvel Comics. Disney entertainment.
- Repo Men: script for two original webisodes. Universal Studios.
- NIKE Hooptown: short webisodes featuring Vince Carter and LeBron James. screenwriter and storyboard artist. Client: Nike
- Ultimate Spider-Man: Script for animated show. Marvel Comics. Disney entertainment.
- The Punisher: Screenplay with Garth Ennis for THQ Games.
- Ghost Rider: Screenplay with Garth Ennis for 2K Games.
- Mortal Kombat vs. DC Universe: Screenplay with Garth Ennis for Midway Games.
- Injustice: Gods Among Us for NeatherRealm Studios
