= Batman: The Dark Knight =

US comic book series

- Promotional art for the cover of Batman: The Dark Knight #1 (November 2010). Art by David Finch.

Publication information
- Publisher: DC Comics
- Schedule: Monthly
- Format: Ongoing series
- Genre: Superhero
- Publication date: (vol. 1); January – October 2011 (vol. 2); September 2011 – March 2014
- No. of issues: (vol. 1): 5 (vol. 2): 32 (#0-29 and #23.1-23.4) and 1 Annual
- Main character: Bruce Wayne/Batman

Creative team
- Written by: David Finch; Paul Jenkins; Joe Harris; Judd Winick; Gregg Hurwitz
- Penciller(s): (vol. 1–2); David Finch; Ed Benes; Ethan van Sciver
- Inker(s): (vol. 1–2); Scott Williams
- Letterer: Dave Sharpe
- Colorist(s): (vol. 1–2); Alex Sinclair
- Editor(s): Mike Marts; Janelle Siegel

Batman: The Dark Knight is an American comic book ongoing series and limited series, and featuring Batman, published by the comic book publishing company DC Comics. One of two new ongoing titles to feature Bruce Wayne after the "Batman: The Return of Bruce Wayne" storyline, The Dark Knight depicts Bruce Wayne's life in Gotham City following his new global commitment to the newly established Batman Incorporated. In the writer David Finch's words, the stories are about relationships and connections he has in Gotham City that he cannot walk away from.

== Style and tone ==
Although the majority of his resources and time go into his new global project, Batman, Inc., Finch describes his series as Bruce being unable to completely separate himself from his hometown and battleground for so many years. Finch states: "Even though Dick is here, it's not easy for Bruce to completely walk away. As much as Dick has proven himself, Bruce Wayne is still Bruce Wayne. It's very difficult for Bruce to just completely walk away from a fight he's been fighting his whole life. And then there's something in particular that keeps him interested as we kick off the series". Finch also addressed the nature of new, globally themed stories permeating most of the Batman line with Bruce Wayne, and how his title will stand out and largely apart from that trend: "Batman, in my book, is entirely in Gotham City. And yeah, this is the Batman we all know and love, and have for 70 years. Although Batman is spending time all over the world, he still has Gotham City as his home base, and he still has so many connections and ties and grudges and friendships in Gotham City".

Finch described his overall take on the character of Bruce Wayne: "Batman is a character that I know very well, and I had a strong sense of direction for him. I would be more reluctant to take on a character that I don't feel like I can relate to as well. He's very driven and black and white. I love that in a world of so much grey he can cut through it with so much clarity. Right or wrong, he never has to question. And there's something very engaging about a character that pushes his limits and never surrenders. There are so many variables and possibilities in a story, but you always know what Batman will do".

== Plot ==
=== Volume One ===
Launched alongside Batman Incorporated, the first volume of the series would last five issues. The plot was made to bridge the gap between Black Mass and Batman Incorporated. It deals with Batman searching for his childhood friend Dawn Golden, who was involved with a conspiracy involving Killer Croc. Croc had ended up selling her to the Penguin, who was using her as a tool of revenge against his own personal humility and against Batman. Eventually, Batman discovers Dawn's relations to the demon Etrigan and his host Jason Blood. In the end, Batman mourns the loss of Dawn, who is fatally wounded.

=== Volume Two ===
DC Comics relaunched Batman: The Dark Knight with issue #1 in September 2011, as part of The New 52. While David Finch was originally supposed to be the writer on the series permanently, Paul Jenkins was later announced to be co-writing issues. Joe Harris and Judd Winick had guest appearances before Gregg Hurwitz would take over the series.

"Knight Terrors": As Bruce is unable to keep up with the various legal conspiracies involving Batman Incorporated, he decides to investigate a breakout at Arkham Asylum. There he finds criminals being fed a modified fear toxin that is mixed in with venom which makes the criminals extremely strong and immune to fear. He finds it being given to criminals by a new foe named White Rabbit. When Batman approaches her she quickly defeats him and injects him with the fear toxin, which she then gives to the Flash. Bruce then finds Bane to be behind the new fear toxin and combats him, Bruce manages to burn the fear toxin out of his and the Flash's body's by getting pushed to the limit. Bruce manages to defeat Bane, but is left confused by White Rabbit.

== Collected editions ==
Title	Material collected	Published date	ISBN
Batman: The Dark Knight: Golden Dawn	Batman: The Dark Knight (vol. 1) #1–5 and material from Superman/Batman #75, Batman: The Return #1	January 2012	978-1401232153
Batman: The Dark Knight Vol. 1: Knight Terrors	Batman: The Dark Knight (vol. 2) #1-9	October 2012	978-1401235437
Batman: The Dark Knight Vol. 2: Cycle of Violence	Batman: The Dark Knight (vol. 2) #0, #10-15	July 2013	978-1401240745
Batman: The Dark Knight Vol. 3: Mad	Batman: The Dark Knight (vol. 2) #16-21, Annual #1	January 2014	978-1401242473
Batman: The Dark Knight Vol. 4: Clay	Batman: The Dark Knight (vol. 2) #22–29	July 2014	978-1401246204
Batman: The Dark Knight Unwrapped by David Finch	Batman: The Dark Knight (vol. 1) #1-3, Batman: The Return #1, Batman: The Dark Knight (vol. 2) #1-7, 9 (pencils only)	May 2015	978-1401248840
DC New 52 Villains Omnibus	Batman: The Dark Knight #23.1-23.4 and Justice League #23.1-23.4, Justice League of America #7.1-7.4, Justice League Dark #23.1-23.2, Aquaman #23.1-23.2, Earth-2 #15.1-15.2, The Flash #23.1-23.3, Green Arrow #23.1, Wonder Woman #23.1-23.2, Action Comics #23.1-23.4, Superman #23.1-23.4, Batman/Superman #3.1, Batman #23.1-23.4, Batman and Robin #23.1-23.4, Detective Comics #23.1-23.4, Green Lantern #23.1-23.4, Swamp Thing #23.1, Teen Titans #23.1-23.2	December 2013	978-1401244965
