= Legendary Entertainment =

American film studio

Legendary Entertainment, LLC
- Logo used since 2019

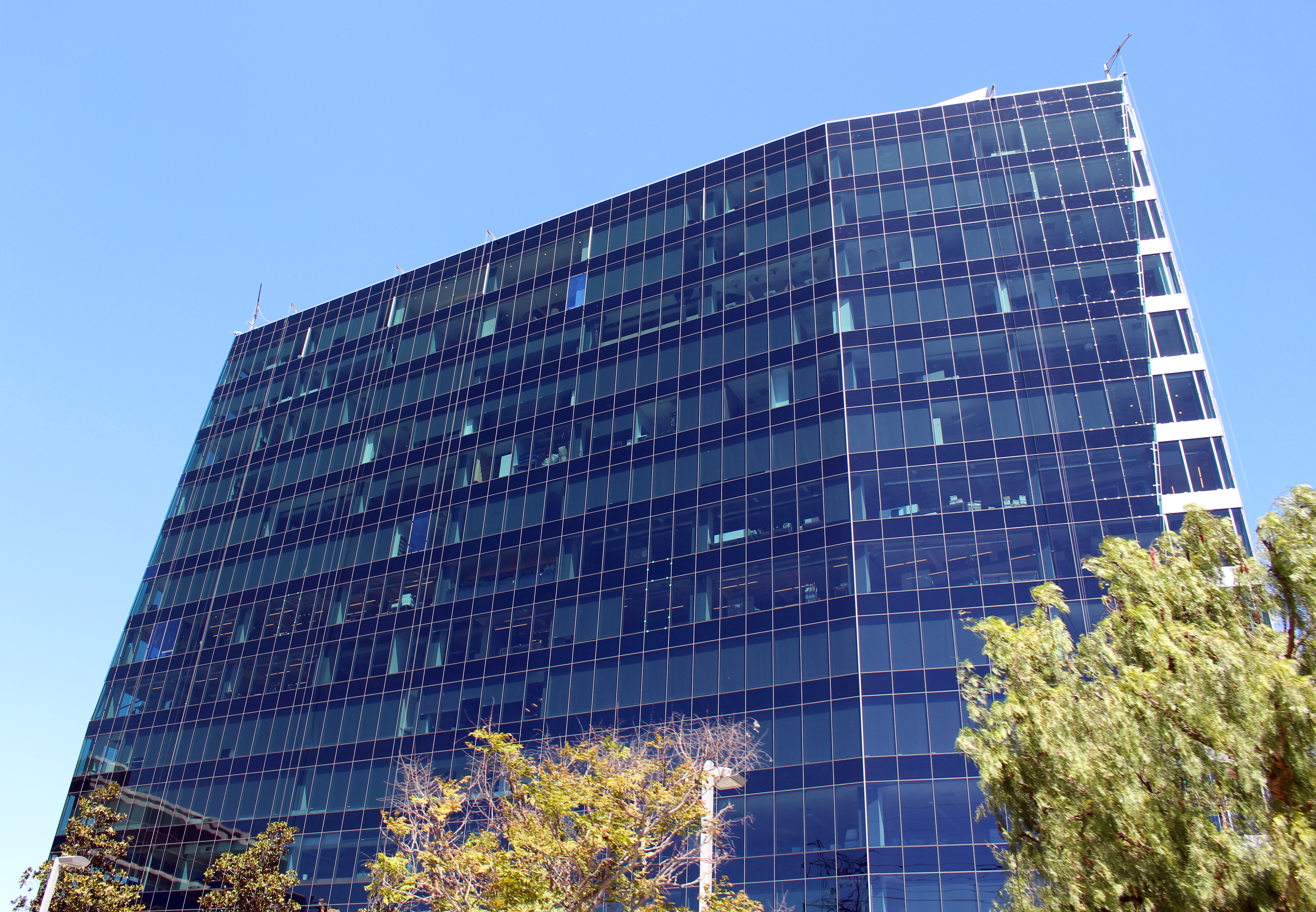
- Legendary Entertainment headquarters at the Pointe office building in Burbank
- Type: Private
- Industry: Motion picture; Media; Publishing
- Founded: 2003; 23 years ago
- Founder: Thomas Tull; Jon Jashni; Larry Clark; William Fay; Scott Mednick
- Headquarters: 2900 West Alameda Avenue, Burbank, California, United States
- Key people: Thomas Tull (founding chairman); Mary Parent (vice chairman); Joshua Grode (CEO) (2017–present)
- Owners: Each of 50% owned by: Legendary's management Apollo Global Management
- Number of employees: 153
- Divisions: Legendary Pictures; Legendary Comics; Legendary Television; Legendary East; Legendary Digital Networks
- Subsidiaries: Five33; Geek & Sundry; Nerdist Industries; Amy Poehler's Smart Girls; 193 (joint-venture with Patrick Wachsberger)
- Website: legendary.com

Legendary Entertainment, LLC (or simply Legendary) is an American mass media company based in Burbank, California. It was founded by film producer Thomas Tull in 2003 after he was fired from Convex Group. The company has often collaborated with the major studios, including Warner Bros. Pictures, Universal Pictures, Sony Pictures, and Paramount Pictures, as well as streaming services such as Netflix and Hulu.

In 2016, Legendary became a subsidiary of the Chinese conglomerate Wanda Group, with American equity firm Apollo buying a minority stake in 2022. In 2024, Legendary Entertainment's management bought out Wanda's stake, making them and Apollo equal partners. In January 2026, Japanese media company TBS Holdings acquired $150 million of equity from Legendary as part of their non-exclusive agreement with the company to produce and develop Japanese intellectual property (IP).

== History ==
Thomas Tull founded Legendary Entertainment after he was fired from Atlanta-based investment company Convex Group, with co-founders, Jon Jashni, Larry Clark, William Fay, and Scott Mednick in 2003 after raising $500 million from private equity firms. It was one of the first companies of its kind to pair major motion picture production with major Wall Street private equity and hedge fund investors, including ABRY Partners, AIG Direct Investments, Bank of America Capital Investors, Columbia Capital, Falcon Investment Advisors, and M/C Venture Partners. Legendary Pictures, Inc. was incorporated in California, and in 2005 it signed an agreement with Warner Bros. to co-produce and co-finance up to 40 films over seven years, putting up half the money for Batman Begins (2005) and Superman Returns (2006).

=== 2010s ===
In 2010, Tull, Fidelity Investments, and Fortress Investment Group bought all the shares of the original investors. The buyout also included a $25 million investment by Orange Sky Golden Harvest Entertainment. Following the transaction, Tull became the largest shareholder, thus enabling him to more easily direct the company's operations. Golden Harvest later sold its stake in the company for $30 million. In 2011, Accel Partners bought $40 million-worth of shares, and Accel partner Jim Breyer joined the company's board of directors. That same year, the company was reported to have been valued at more than $1 billion.

In September 2011, Legendary Pictures Chief Creative Officer (CCO) Jon Jashni was appointed to the new position of President and CCO of the parent company, Legendary Entertainment. William Fay left Legendary Pictures in September 2011. In December 2012, Waddell & Reed bought around 20% of Legendary's shares for $443 million.

On July 10, 2013, Legendary reached an agreement with Universal Pictures in which it would market, co-finance, and distribute Legendary Pictures' films for five years starting in 2014, the year that Legendary's similar agreement with Warner Bros. expired. In October 2014, SoftBank bought $250 million shares in Legendary for a 10% stake. The transaction increased the company's total value to around $3 billion.

In 2014, Legendary acquired the television producer Asylum Entertainment, which made ESPN's 30 for 30 and the 2011 miniseries The Kennedys, for $100 million, with Asylum Entertainment to continue operating as a separate company.

On January 11, 2016, Chinese conglomerate Wanda Group announced it had concluded an agreement with shareholders to acquire Legendary Entertainment for $3.5 billion, making it the largest acquisition of an American media company by a Chinese firm.

In March 2016, it was announced that Jon Jashni had decided, on the heels of the sale, to leave the company to establish Raintree Ventures, a media investment and advisory firm.

On January 17, 2017, it was announced that Tull had exited as Legendary Entertainment CEO. He was replaced by the senior vice president of Wanda's cultural industry group, Jack Gao, as interim CEO.

On October 17, 2017, it was reported that Gao stepped down from his positions at Legendary Entertainment and Wanda Group. The resignation came after an announcement by Wanda's chairman, Wang Jianlin, earlier that year that Wanda would refocus its investments onto the Chinese domestic market in an attempt to "actively respond to the call of the country". This, in turn, was thought to be a consequence of the Chinese government banning Chinese banks from providing loans to Wanda Group's foreign operations, which was intended to stop the firm's offshore acquisition plans.

On December 5, 2017, it was announced that Joshua Grode had been named as Legendary Entertainment CEO.

On August 13, 2018, following the box office failure of several films, including Seventh Son (2014), Blackhat (2015), Steve Jobs (2015), Crimson Peak (2015), Warcraft (2016), The Great Wall (2016), Pacific Rim Uprising (2018), and Skyscraper (2018), the distribution deal between Legendary and Universal ended and a new agreement was reached to return to Warner Bros.

In December 2019, Legendary Entertainment teamed up with former Starz executive Chris Albrecht to create a international television venture production arm that would produce and finance international TV series separate from Legendary's main TV division Legendary Television, however the international TV venture production arm will provide Legendary Entertainment's production infrastructure and administrative support services. Two months later in late-February 2020, Legendary Entertainment would name its international TV venture production arm Legendary Global as the venture production arm had announced they had partnered with Jack Throne to develop a new adaptation of Charles Dickens' novel A Tale of Two Citites. A month later in March of that year, Legendary Global had appointed Anne Thomopoulos to become their partner at Legendary's global TV joint-venture arm Legendary Global.

=== 2020s–present ===
In December 2020, Variety and Deadline Hollywood reported that Legendary Entertainment, financiers, and talent with backend deals were not pleased with WarnerMedia's multi-release plans and non-transparent intentions. Legendary was not given advanced notice of the multi-release decision nor given a say in how Dune (2021) and Godzilla vs. Kong (2021) would be distributed. The studio planned to have discussions with Warner Bros. regarding a more "generous deal" however legal action was considered. A few weeks later, Deadline reported that the film could keep its HBO Max release but only if Warner Bros. matched Netflix's $250 million bid. In January 2021, The Hollywood Reporter revealed that a legal battle was averted due to Legendary and WarnerMedia nearing an agreement to keep the film's simultaneous release.

On April 30, 2021, the company hired LionTree Advisors to explore possible deals, including the possibility of merging with a SPAC, making acquisitions, or finding partners. On July 22, 2021, it was announced that Legendary was looking for a merger instead of a SPAC. On January 31, 2022, a minority stake in Legendary was sold to Apollo Global Management, with Wanda still remaining the majority owner.

On July 14, 2022, Legendary Entertainment reached its first entry into Germany as they had formed a partnership with Berlin-based German independent film and TV production/distribution company Tobis to establish a joint-venture German TV production/distribution arm that would produce German-language scripted TV series for German television networks and streaming platforms, called Legendary Tobis TV, the new German TV production/distribution joint-venture unit would be based at Tobis' Munich-based office and Legendary would serve as international distributor to series made by its new German joint-venture arm with Tobis outside of Germany.

On August 31, 2022, following the lapse of their deal with Warner Bros., Legendary Entertainment began seeking a new partnership, with Sony Pictures and Paramount Pictures among the companies interested.

On November 28, 2022, Legendary Entertainment reached an agreement with Sony Pictures in which Sony would market, co-finance, and distribute Legendary Pictures' films with the exception of China, where Legendary East would handle all marketing and distribution for its movies. Sony would also handle home entertainment and TV distribution for the Legendary titles it distributes. The partnership pact did not include Dune: Part Two (2024) and Godzilla x Kong: The New Empire (2024), as Legendary would continue to remain in business for Warner Bros. Pictures. Legendary would also continue to partner with other companies for streaming, such as Netflix, as Sony does not have a streaming service.

In October 2024, Legendary bought the Wanda Group out of its majority stake in the company for an undisclosed sum, in what its CEO Josh Grode described as a transaction in a "right place, right time situation" accretive to both management and Apollo Global Management, which would share a "roughly equal" stake. Grode further stated that Legendary's board of directors would be evenly split between management and Apollo executives, although its creative team led by Mary Parent would remain unchanged, with the company attaining more flexibility to pursue mergers and acquisitions on a large scale, "... when we would have conversations around large scale M&A, we would have to deal with the foreign ownership issue, and that's now no longer an issue."

In November 2024, following the poor box office performances of their films such as The Machine (2023) and The Book of Clarence (2023), the distribution deal between Legendary and Sony Pictures lapsed.

On January 21, 2025, the company entered into a joint venture with film producer Patrick Wachsberger to launch 193, a production and sales company that would develop and produce its own slate, outside of Legendary.

On July 11, 2025, Legendary was eyeing a deal to acquire Lionsgate Studios, following the latter company's separation from Starz. On August 18, 2025, it was announced that Legendary was also eyeing a multi-picture global theatrical distribution deal with Paramount Pictures. In September, they closed the Paramount deal, which was set for three years.

On October 20, 2026, Bloomberg reported that Legendary's deal to acquire Lionsgate Studios would cost $3.5 billion. The deal would give Legendary Pictures a theatrical distribution arm, as well as Lionsgate's extensive and cash-generating library.

== Divisions and ventures ==
Legendary Entertainment owns various business endeavors.

=== Legendary Digital Networks ===
In 2009, the company announced the establishment of a digital division, to be headed by Kathy Vrabeck, that would primarily focus on game development, a move that surprised many industry analysts due to the film industry's previous disengagement with the video game industry. The division's goal was reoriented in 2012 with the acquisition of Nerdist Industries, LLC, a pop culture blog with an eponymous podcast. Nerdist founder Chris Hardwick announced that he and his partner Peter Levin (founder of GeekChicDaily) would still have complete editorial autonomy and that they would become the new presidents of the digital division, with Levin heading digital strategy and the digital content. In 2014, Legendary acquired both Geek & Sundry, Inc., a YouTube channel and production company, and the website Amy Poehler's Smart Girls. On June 10, 2016, LDN announced a subscription streaming service, Alpha, which would include programming from both Nerdist and Geek & Sundry. The Alpha service was shut down on March 31, 2019.

In July 2020, Legendary laid off 30% of the LDN staff. Variety reported on "a sense that the [LDN] operations were a money drain on the company's profitable film and television operations. Those cuts were accelerated by the onset of COVID-19, which has resulted in layoffs and furloughs across the entertainment industry". The Hollywood Reporter reported that "digital brands have become less important to the strategic direction of Legendary in recent years as the online content business has shifted away from the networks that grew big during the early heyday of YouTube stardom. Legendary Digital is not a moneymaker for the business the way its core film and TV divisions are". In April 2021, CBR reported that "Geek & Sundry as an original content producer hasn't exactly been operational for a couple of years".

=== Legendary Comics ===
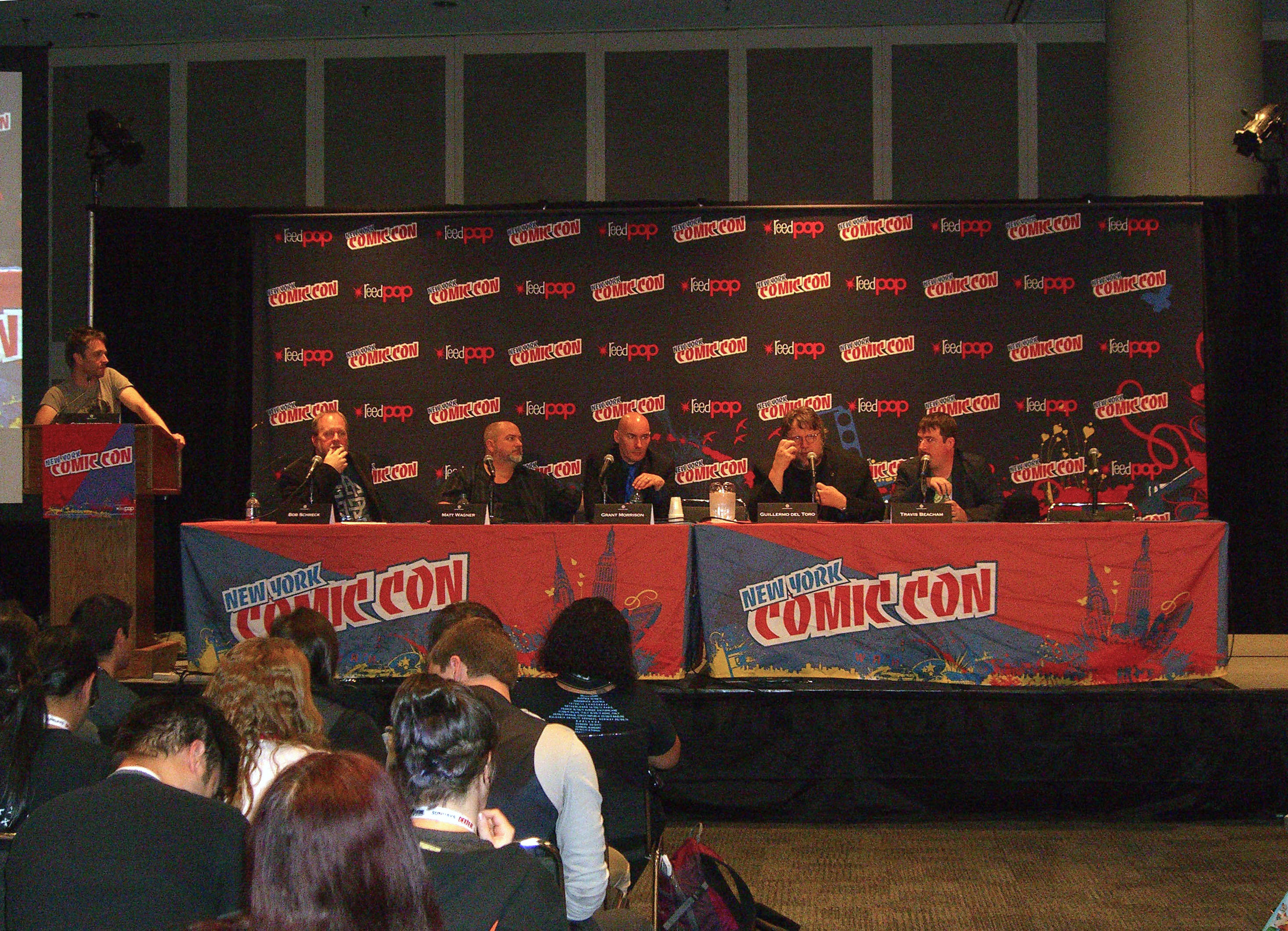
The Legendary Comics panel at the 2012 New York Comic Con. From left to right: emcee Chris Hardwick, Bob Schreck, Matt Wagner, Grant Morrison, Guillermo del Toro and Travis Beacham.

In 2010, the company announced the launch of a comic book division called Legendary Comics, LLC under the direction of editor-in-chief Bob Schreck. The first graphic novel published by the company was Holy Terror by Frank Miller, which was released in 2011. The division is now overseen by Senior Vice President Robert Napton.

=== Legendary Television and Digital Media ===
In 2011, the company announced the creation of Legendary Television to focus on developing television productions, and a co-financing contract with Warner Bros. Television was signed. However, in 2012, Legendary decided to postpone its expansion into TV and put the division on hold while restructuring; the contract with Warner Bros. Television was terminated.

In 2013, Legendary purchased film marketing agency Five33 Ltd. The company, which in the past had worked on marketing campaigns for various studios, would now work exclusively on marketing Legendary's films. Also in 2013, Legendary hired former head of Warner Bros. Television, Bruce Rosenblum, to head Legendary's TV and digital media operations. In December 2013, Legendary acquired TV production company Asylum Entertainment, best known for producing sports programming and reality and scripted TV series, such as Beyond the Glory and The Kennedys.

=== Legendary East ===
In 2011, the company announced the formation of Legendary East Ltd., a joint venture film production company based in Hong Kong. The purpose of the company was to co-produce films with Chinese companies to bypass Chinese quotas on foreign film releases in the country.

Under an initial agreement with Chinese film distributor Huayi Brothers International, 50% of the company was to be owned by the shell corporation Paul Y. Engineering Group, 40% was to be owned by Legendary Entertainment (through holding companies such as Legendary Asian Pacific, LLC or Legendary East Holdings, LLC), and 10% was to be owned by the Huayi Brothers International. Legendary East initially hoped to produce one to two globally marketed English-language films per year and finance a quarter of the production of an additional two films per year. The company hoped to raise US$220.5 million through the sale of stock of Paul Y. Engineering Group on the Hong Kong Stock Exchange by the end of 2011. However, because financing did not meet the targeted goal, Legendary East scrapped the deal with Huayi Brothers International and continued its efforts to secure financing in 2012.

In 2013, Legendary East announced a new agreement with China Film Group. Under the new agreement, the two companies were to co-produce multiple films over a three-year period. Peter Loehr oversaw the company's activities in China and brokered an alliance with Wanda Group, which eventually led to the company's sale to Wanda in 2016.

== Films ==
Legendary Pictures' highest-grossing films include Jurassic World (2015) at $1.67 billion, Jurassic World: Fallen Kingdom (2018) at $1.31 billion, and The Dark Knight Rises (2012) at $1.08 billion.

Legendary has helped produced multiple films for specific directors, including Michael Dougherty (Trick 'r Treat, Krampus, Godzilla: King of the Monsters), Christopher Nolan (The Dark Knight, Inception, The Dark Knight Rises, Interstellar), Todd Phillips (The Hangover, Due Date, The Hangover Part II, The Hangover Part III), Zack Snyder (300, Watchmen, Sucker Punch, Man of Steel), and Denis Villeneuve (Dune, Dune: Part Two, Dune: Part Three).
