= Bob Schreck =

American comic book writer and editor (born 1955)

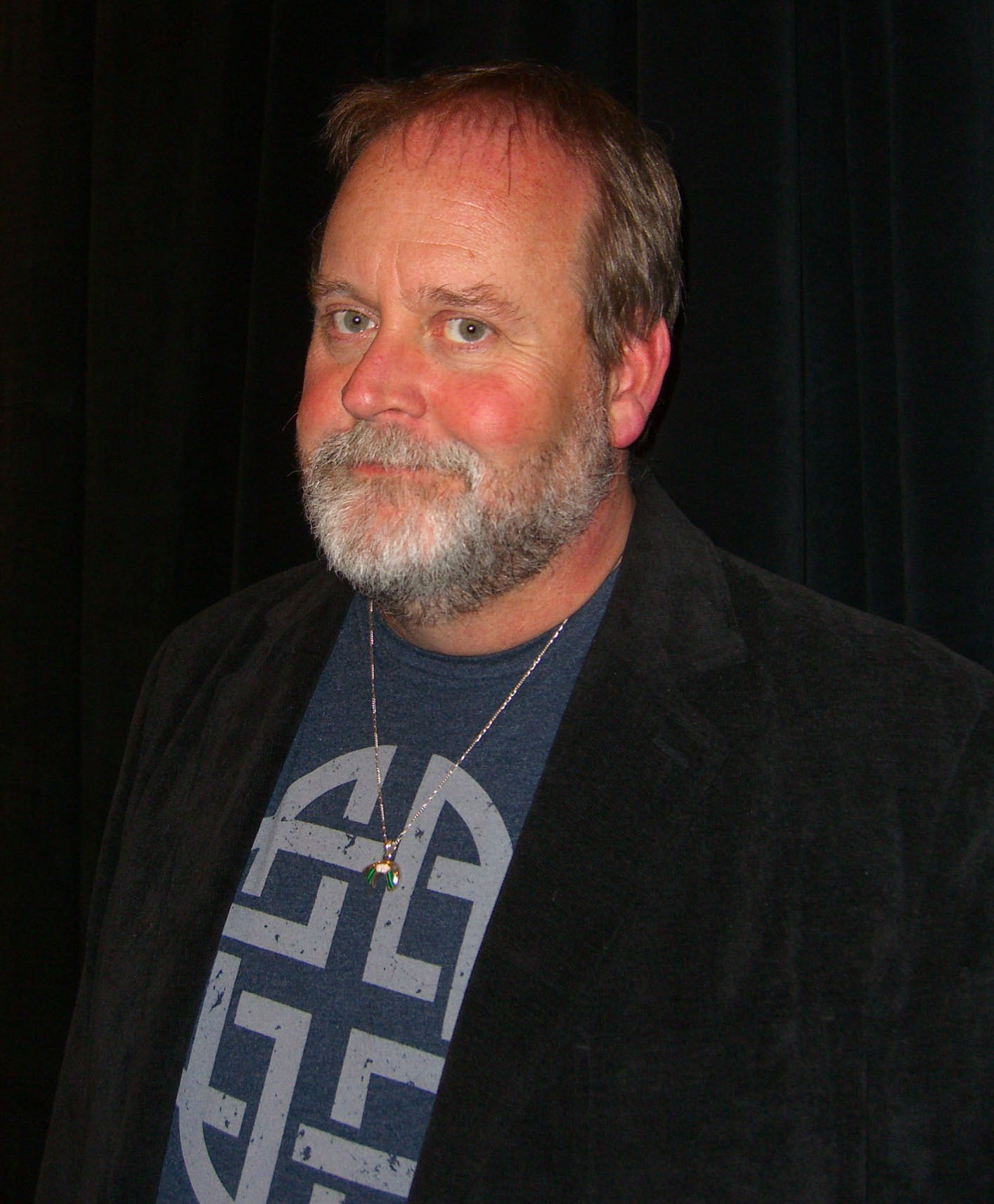
- Schreck at the 2012 New York Comic Con
- Born: February 2, 1955 (age 71)
- Area: Editor
- Notable works: Co-founder of Oni Press; Editor-in-chief of Legendary Comics
- Awards: Inkpot Award, 1990

Robert "Bob" Schreck (/ʃrɛk/; born February 2, 1955) is an American comic book writer and editor. Schreck is best known for his influential role as editor and marketing director at Dark Horse Comics in the 1990s, co-founding Oni Press, and for his subsequent stint as editor for DC Comics. He is currently the Deputy Director of the Comic Book Legal Defense Fund.

== Personal life ==
Bob Schreck grew up in Levittown, New York. An avid performer, he sang for progressive rock bands and Rocky Horror shows. He currently resides in Milwaukie, Oregon with his husband Randy.

== Career ==
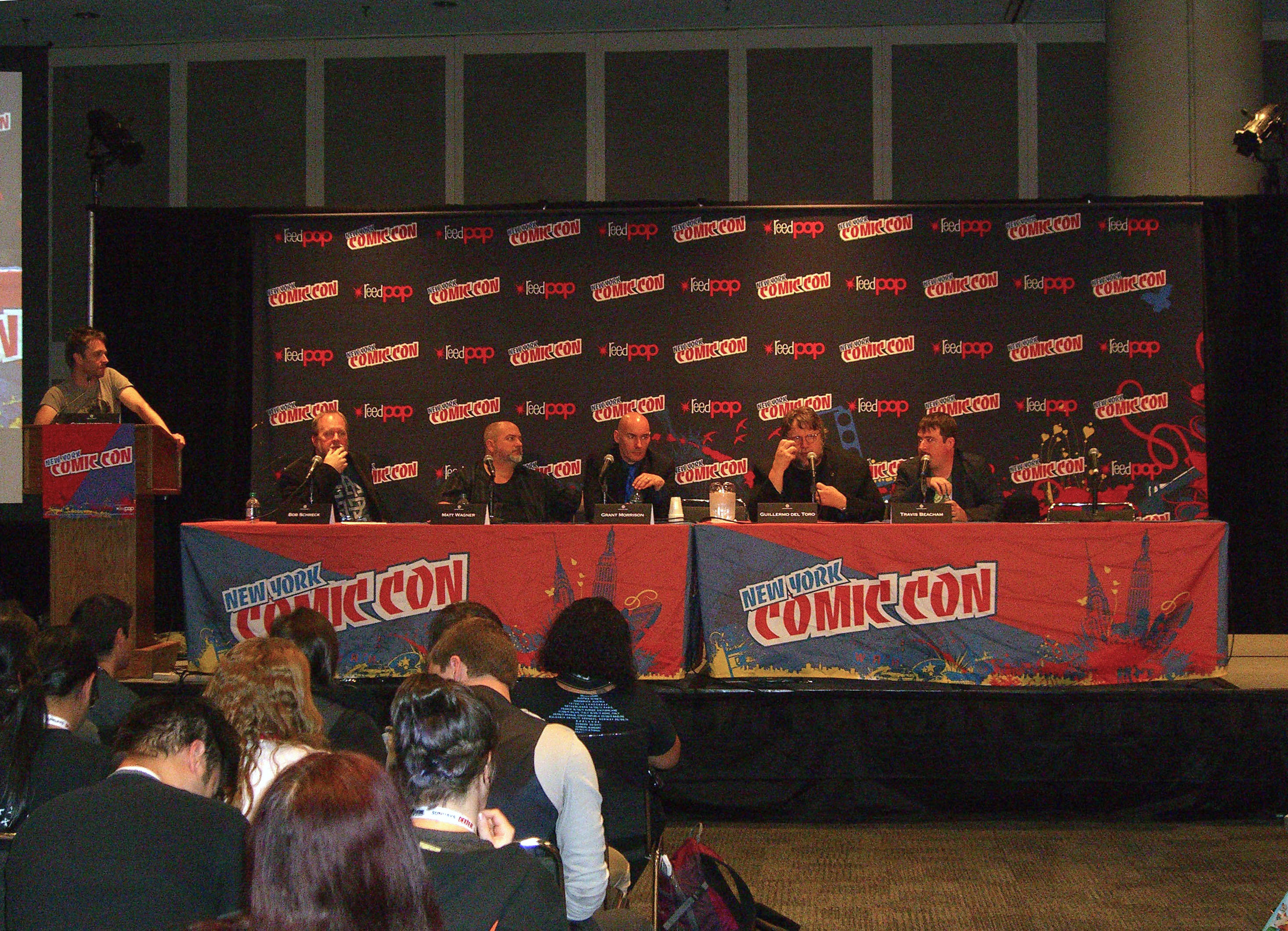
Schreck, second from left, at the Legendary Comics panel at the 2012 New York Comic Con. Sharing the stage with him from left to right: emcee Chris Hardwick, Matt Wagner, Guillermo del Toro and Travis Beacham.

=== Beginnings ===
In the mid-1970s, Bob Schreck began working for Creation Entertainment organizing and running conventions around the country, where he got to know most of the era's comic book professionals, and met aspirants and up-and-comers such as Matt Wagner, who has called Schreck "a major force in the comics industry". In the early 1980s he worked in the marketing department at Marvel Comics.

=== Comico ===
In 1985, Schreck and his future wife (now divorced) Diana Schutz were hired as, respectively, Administrative Director (in charge of marketing and publishing) and Editor in Chief of Comico Comics. Under their stewardship Comico rose to the third best-selling comics publisher, after Marvel and DC. Schreck was closely involved in the publication of titles such as Mage and Grendel, Elementals, Robotech, and Jonny Quest, was responsible for several acclaimed graphic novels including Mike Baron's Ginger Fox and Doug Wildey's Rio, and secured work from such luminaries as William Messner-Loebs, Steve Rude and Dave Stevens, among many others. Despite its success, by the end of the '80s Comico was spiraling into bankruptcy and Schreck and Schutz left for greener pastures.

=== Dark Horse Comics ===
After a brief stint at Graphitti Designs, Schreck worked at Dark Horse Comics from 1990–97, where he served as marketing director, editor and group editor. During this time Schreck brought several talents to a wider audience, including Mike Allred who explained, "In many ways he was my own personal marketing director.... For that and many other reasons Dark Horse launched Madman even higher into the stratosphere" and Paul Pope, who credits Schreck as an important factor in his career. In addition to his work as marketing director and talent recruiter, Schreck was the editor of many titles including Frank Miller's Sin City, The Big Guy and Rusty the Boy Robot, Madman, Art Adams's Monkeyman and O'Brien, and the anthology title Dark Horse Presents which became one of the most important places for new talent to enter the field alongside well-known names doing often experimental or edgier work. Schreck was later instrumental in compelling Frank Miller to work with director Robert Rodriguez on a film version of Sin City. During this time Dark Horse became the third best-selling comics publisher in the country.

=== Oni Press ===
Schreck left Dark Horse in 1997 and shortly thereafter co-founded Oni Press with Joe Nozemack. Oni's original goal was publishing comics and graphic novels the founders would want to read. Unsatisfied with the material that was dominating the industry, they believed firmly that sequential art could be used to tell virtually any story. Oni titles Schreck edited include Kevin Smith's Clerks and Jay and Silent Bob comics, Whiteout, Bad Boy by Frank Miller and Simon Bisley, and the award-winning Oni Double Feature.

=== DC/Vertigo ===
After having been courted by DC Comics for over a decade, Schreck left Oni to join them as editor of the Batman titles, which included the acclaimed storyline Hush, and the mini-series The Dark Knight Strikes Again, and Batman: Year 100 as well as recruitment of writers Judd Winick, David Lapham, and Brad Meltzer with his first work in comics. Schreck was also the editor of the Green Lantern books, Green Arrow including the acclaimed Quiver series by frequent Schreck collaborator Kevin Smith, All-Star Superman by Grant Morrison and Frank Quitely, and All-Star Batman by Frank Miller and Jim Lee. For DC's Vertigo imprint he produced the award-winning Daytripper, Sweet Tooth, and the horror anthology Toe Tags, which featured a story by film director George A. Romero

=== Post-DC publishing career and CBLDF ===
After leaving DC in January 2009, Schreck joined IDW Publishing as a senior editor, where he also wrote the comic book series Jurassic Park: Redemption.

In 2010, he was named editor-in-chief of Legendary Comics, a division he co-founded with editor Greg Tumbarello, where they launched as a top ten publisher with their inaugural title Holy Terror by Frank Miller. Other works they published include the Eisner Award-nominated Annihilator by Grant Morrison and Frazer Irving, The Tower Chronicles by Matt Wagner and Simon Bisley, A Town Called Dragon by Judd Winick and Geoff Shaw, Shadow Walk by Mark Waid and Shane Davis, and Cops for Criminals by Steven Grant and Pete Woods, as well as NY Times #1 Best Selling graphic novel Pacific Rim: Tales from Year Zero, NY Times Best Seller Godzilla: Awakening, and tie-ins to Warcraft, and King Kong.

After retiring from Legendary, Schreck became Deputy Director of the Comic Book Legal Defense Fund (CBLDF) in 2019.

== Editorial philosophy ==
Schreck has long been a source of editorial advice in the industry. He tells aspiring writers, "you can take the clunkiest of artists and make your story interesting, and force the artist to draw something, no matter how rudimentary, that makes my brain believe you know what you're doing. Those words really inform that picture. They make me think beyond and between the panels. If you can do that, you got it sold.... Quite honestly, you hear in the world there's something like only seven stories ever told. It's how you tell it... Go to Kinko's, create your own fun little ashcans. Tell stories. Tell stories in any format you can."

Frequent collaborator Paul Pope said of working with Schreck, "He knows how to get me working on it. Sometimes it's flattery, sometimes it's encouragement, sometimes it's — well, he just opens Holy Hell before you."

Schreck credits his editorial philosophy in part to the influence of Archie Goodwin, explaining: "I try to provide very fertile topsoil. A place for these people to take root and grow... a certain amount of stepping back and compassion, just being able to listen to what it is... many times the writer or the artist you're working with, they're not quite sure what it is they want to say at this juncture. So you're there to hear things that even they're not picking up on and help them see it."

== Awards ==
- 1990: Won Inkpot Award
- 1995:
  - Won "Best Anthology" Harvey Award for Dark Horse Presents
  - Nominated for "Best Editor" Eisner Award, for Madman, Dark Horse Presents, Rascals in Paradise
  - Nominated for "Best Anthology" Eisner Award, for Dark Horse Presents
- 1997: Won "Best Anthology" Harvey Award for Dark Horse Presents
- 1998: Won "Best Anthology" Harvey Award for Dark Horse Presents
- 1999:
  - Won "Best Anthology" Harvey Award for Oni Double Feature
  - Nominated for "Best Anthology" Eisner Award, for Oni Double Feature
- 2002: Nominated for "Favorite Editor" Eisner Award, for Batman and Green Arrow

== Notes ==
Preceded by Denny O'Neil	Batman Group Editor; 2000–2006	Succeeded by Peter Tomasi
