= Legendary Comics =

American comic book publisher

- Parent company: Legendary Entertainment
- Founded: 2010; 16 years ago
- Founder: Bob Schreck; Greg Tumbarello
- Country of origin: United States
- Headquarters location: Stillwater, Oklahoma
- Distribution: Simon & Schuster
- Key people: Robert Napton (SVP and Publisher); Nikita Kannekanti (Director of Publishing and Senior Editor)
- Publication types: Comic books
- Imprints: Legendary Comics YA
- Owner: Legendary Entertainment
- No. of employees: 2-10
- Official website: www.legendary.com/comics/

Legendary Comics is an American comic book publisher founded in 2010. The company is owned by Legendary Entertainment, a media company located in Burbank, California. The company publishes both original works and licensed ones based on films produced by Legendary Pictures.

== History ==
Legendary Entertainment first announced the launch of its comic book division, Legendary Comics, in 2010 with the appointment of editor-in-chief Bob Schreck and editor Greg Tumbarello. The first graphic novel published by the company was Holy Terror by Frank Miller, which was released in 2011 as the #1 graphic novel and immediately launched the division as a top ten comics publisher. Pacific Rim: Tales from Year Zero was a #1 New York Times Best Seller, Godzilla: Awakening was a New York Times Best Seller, and Annihilator by Grant Morrison & Frazer Irving was nominated for an Eisner Award. In 2020, the company published an adaptation of Bram Stoker's 1897 Dracula novel, which used the likeness of Bela Lugosi, the lead actor in the 1931 film from Universal Pictures.

== Bibliography ==
=== Graphic novels and collections ===
Legendary Comics has published several original graphic novels and collections of serialized works.

Name	Release date	Type	Credits	ISBN
Holy Terror	September 28, 2011	Graphic novel (HC)	Story and art – Frank Miller; Cover colors – Dave Stewart	ISBN 978-1937278007
Pacific Rim: Tales from Year Zero	June 18, 2013	Graphic novel (HC)	Story – Travis Beacham; Pencils – Sean Chen, Yvel Guichet, Pericles Junior, Chris Batista, and Geoff Shaw; Inks – Matt Banning, Steve Bird, and Mark McKenna; Colors – Tom Chu, Guy Major, and Dominic Regan; Letters – Patrick Broussard; Cover art – Alex Ross	ISBN 978-0785153948
The Tower Chronicles Book One: GeistHawk	August 13, 2013	Collection (HC) (vols. #1–4)	Story – Matt Wagner; Pencils – Simon Bisley; Inks – Rodney Ramos; Colors – Ryan Brown; Letters – Sean Konot; Cover art – Shane Davis	ISBN 978-0785185277
Shadow Walk	December 17, 2013	Graphic novel (HC)	Story – Mark Waid; Pencils – Shane Davis; Inks – Mark Morales; Colors – Morry Hollowell; Letters – Jared K. Fletcher	ISBN 978-0785153979
Godzilla: Awakening	May 13, 2014	Graphic novel (HC)	Story – Max Borenstein and Greg Borenstein; Art – Eric Battle, Yvel Guichet, and Alan Quah; Colors – Lee Loughridge; Letters – Patrick Broussard; Cover art – Arthur Adams	ISBN 978-1401250355
Godzilla: Awakening	September 16, 2014	Graphic novel (SC)	Story – Max Borenstein and Greg Borenstein; Art – Eric Battle, Yvel Guichet, and Alan Quah; Colors – Lee Loughridge; Letters – Patrick Broussard; Cover art – Arthur Adams	ISBN 978-1401252526
The Tower Chronicles: DreadStalker Volume One	February 17, 2015	Collection (SC) (issues #1–6)	Story – Matt Wagner; Art – Simon Bisley; Colors – Ryan Brown; Letters – Sean Konot	ISBN 978-1937278366
A Town Called Dragon	April 21, 2015	Collection (SC) (issues #1–5)	Story – Judd Winick; Art – Geoff Shaw; Colors – Jamie Grant; Letters – Sean Konot	ISBN 978-1937278403
Epochalypse	July 7, 2015	Collection (SC) (issues #1–6)	Story – Jonathan Hennessey; Art – Shane Davis; Colors – Morry Hollowell; Letters – Pat Brosseau	ISBN 978-1937278496
Annihilator	August 18, 2015	Collection (HC) (issues #1–6)	Story – Grant Morrison; Art and colors – Frazer Irving; Letters – Jared K. Fletcher	ISBN 978-1937278441
Annihilator	November 17, 2020	Collection (SC) (issues #1–6)	Story – Grant Morrison; Art and colors – Frazer Irving; Letters – Jared K. Fletcher	ISBN 978-1681160702
The Tower Chronicles: DreadStalker Volume Two	August 18, 2015	Collection (SC) (issues #7–12)	Story – Matt Wagner; Art – Simon Bisley; Colors – Ryan Brown; Letters – Sean Konot	ISBN 978-1937278540
Trick 'r Treat	October 6, 2015	Graphic novel (SC) (Days of the Dead)	Story – Marc Andreyko, Todd Casey, Michael Dougherty, and Zach Shields; Art – Stephen Byrne, Fiona Staples, Stuart Sayger, and Zid; Colors – Guy Major, Riccardo Rullo, and José Villarrubia; Letters – Troy Peteri	ISBN 978-1937278854
Trick 'r Treat	September 22, 2020	Graphic novel (HC) (Omnibus)	Story – Marc Andreyko, Todd Casey, Michael Dougherty, and Zach Shields; Art – Stephen Byrne, Fiona Staples, Stuart Sayger, and Zid; Colors – Guy Major, Riccardo Rullo, and José Villarrubia; Letters – Troy Peteri	ISBN 978-1681160436
Krampus: Shadow of Saint Nicholas	November 24, 2015	Graphic novel (SC)	Story – Todd Casey, Michael Dougherty, Laura Shields, and Zach Shields; Art – Christian DiBari, Maan House, Michael Montenat, and Stuart Sayger; Colors – Guy Major and Michael Spicer; Letters – John J. Hill; Cover art – Fiona Staples	ISBN 978-1937278847
The Infinite Adventures of Jonas Quantum	May 10, 2016	Collection (SC) (issues #1–6)	Story – Marc Guggenheim; Art – Freddie Williams II; Colors – Chris Sotomayor; Letters – Pat Brosseau	ISBN 978-1681160146
Warcraft: Bonds of Brotherhood	June 7, 2016	Graphic novel (HC)	Story – Paul Cornell and Chris Metzen; Art – Mat Broome	ISBN 978-1681160139
Black Bag	July 5, 2016	Collection (SC) (issues #1–6)	Story – Chris Roberson; Art – J. B. Bastos; Colors – Jamie Grant; Letters – Tom Orzechowski; Cover pencils – Drew Johnson; Cover inks – Jamie Grant	ISBN 978-1681160276
Cops for Criminals	July 5, 2016	Collection (SC) (issues #1–5)	Story – Steven Grant; Art and colors – Pete Woods; Letters – Sean Konot; Cover art – Dave Johnson	ISBN 978-1681160290
Pacific Rim: Tales from the Drift	July 5, 2016	Collection (SC) (issues #1–4)	Story – Travis Beacham and Joshua Hale Fialkov; Art – Marcos Marz; Colors – Marcelo Maiolo; Letters – Troy Peteri	ISBN 978-1681160085
The Rise and Fall of Axiom	August 23, 2016	Graphic novel (SC)	Story – Mark Waid; Art – Ed Benes; Colors – Dinei Ribeiro; Letters – Dezi Sienty	ISBN 978-1937278731
The Great Wall: Last Survivor	January 24, 2017	Graphic novel (HC)	Story – Arvid Nelson with Barnaby Legg; Art – Gian Fernando with Joel Gomez; Colors – Guy Major; Letters – Pat Brosseau	ISBN 978-1681160337
Spectral: Ghosts of War	February 1, 2017	Graphic novel (e-book)	Story – Seamus Kevin Fahey and Sean Fahey; Art – Zid	—
Skull Island: The Birth of Kong	December 12, 2017	Collection (SC) (issues #1–4)	Story – Arvid Nelson; Art – Zid; Colors – Zid with Muhammad Iqbal, Kinsun Loh, and Riri Mashuri; Letters – John Roshell	ISBN 978-1681160351
Pacific Rim: Aftermath	November 20, 2018	Collection (SC) (issues #1–6 + "I Am Pentecost")	Story – Cavan Scott; Art – Richard Elson (Aftermath), Beni Lobel (I Am Pentecost); Colors – Guy Major (Aftermath), Christopher Sotomayor (I Am Pentecost); Letters – John Roshell, Sarah Jacobs, Tyler Smith	ISBN 978-1681160450
Lost in Space: Countdown to Danger Volume 1	December 18, 2018	Graphic novel (HC)	Story – Brian Buccellato and Richard Dinnick; Art – Zid	ISBN 978-1681160474
Godzilla: Aftershock	May 21, 2019	Graphic novel (HC)	Story – Arvid Nelson; Art – Drew Edward Johnson; Colors – Allen Passalaqua; Letters – John Roshell, Jimmy Betancourt, and Sarah Jacobs; Cover art – Christopher Shy	ISBN 978-1681160535
Godzilla: Aftershock	May 21, 2019	Graphic novel (HC)	Story – Arvid Nelson; Art – Drew Edward Johnson; Colors – Allen Passalaqua; Letters – John Roshell, Jimmy Betancourt, and Sarah Jacobs; Cover art – Arthur Adams	ISBN 978-1681160573
Firebrand: The Initiation of Natali Presano	June 11, 2019	Collection (SC) (issues #1–25)	Story – Jessica Chobot and Erika Lewis; Art – Claudia Aguirre	ISBN 978-1681160559
Lost in Space: Countdown to Danger Volume 2	June 11, 2019	Graphic novel (HC)	Story – Brian Buccellato and Richard Dinnick; Art – Zid	ISBN 978-1681160511
Carnival Row: From the Dark	August 28, 2019	Graphic novel (e-book)	Story – C.M. Landrus and Charles Velasquez Witosky; Art – Jhun Mar Tadong Entico, Tristan Jurolan, and Harvey Tolibao; Colors – Kevin Anthony De Castro and Kevin Tolibao; Covers – Zid	—
Carnival Row: Sparrowhawk	August 28, 2019	Graphic novel (e-book)	Story – Jordan Crair; Art – Giorgia Sposito; Colors – Triona Farrell	—
Pacific Rim: Amara	December 3, 2019	Collection (SC) (issues #1–10)	Story – Cavan Scott and Zhang Ran; Art – BigN and Taylor Esposito	ISBN 978-1681160603
Lost in Space: Countdown to Danger Volume 3	December 10, 2019	Graphic novel (HC)	Story – Brian Buccellato and Richard Dinnick; Art – Zid	ISBN 978-1681160627
Pokémon: Detective Pikachu	March 10, 2020	Graphic novel (SC)	Story – Brian Buccaletto; Art – Nelson Dániel; Colors – Pete Pantazis	ISBN 978-1681160580
Bram Stoker's Dracula	November 3, 2020	Graphic novel (HC)	Story – Robert Napton (adaptation); Art – El Garing	ISBN 978-1681160641
Acursian	December 1, 2020	Graphic novel (SC)	Story – Carole E. Barrowman, John Barrowman, and Erika Lewis; Art – Beni Lobel and BigN	ISBN 978-1681160726
Godzilla Dominion	April 6, 2021	Graphic novel (SC)	Story – Greg Keyes; Art – Drew Johnson	ISBN 978-1681160788
Kingdom Kong	April 6, 2021	Graphic novel (SC)	Story – Marie Anello; Art – ZID	ISBN 978-1681160801
Championess	April 14, 2021	Graphic novel (SC)	Story – Tarun Shanker, Kelly Zekas; Art – Amanda Perez Puentes	ISBN 978-1681160764
Monsterverse Titanthology Vol 1	June 22, 2021	Collection (HC)	Story - Arvid Nelson; Art - Drew Johnson and Zid	ISBN 978-1681160924

=== Uncollected series ===
- The Harvester (February 2015 – October 2015, #1–9, story by Brandon Seifert, art by Eric Battle, colors by Lee Loughridge, letters by Sean Konot, cover colors by Dominic Regan)
- The Tower Chronicles: Fellquest (October 2015 – February 2017, #1–12, story by Matt Wagner, pencils by Simon Bisley, colors by Ryan Brown)
