= Bad Boy (comics) =

Publication information
- Publisher: Oni Press
- Format: One-shot
- Genre: Military science fiction
- Publication date: December 1997
- No. of issues: 1

Creative team
- Written by: Frank Miller
- Artist: Simon Bisley
- Letterer: Angus McKie
- Colorist: Angus McKie
- Editor(s): Bob Schreck; Diana Schutz

Collected editions
- Hardcover: ISBN 1-933305-54-1

Bad Boy was a serialized comic strip by American writer Frank Miller and British artist Simon Bisley. It was first published in British GQ magazine and later collected as a one-shot by American company Oni Press in 1999, in a 44-page prestige format comic book.

It was republished in July 2008 in hardcover format by Dynamite Entertainment with two covers, one by Bisley and the other by Miller.

== Plot ==
Bad Boy follows the story of Jason, a young boy who comes to realize that the couple he thinks are his parents are not his parents at all, and his world is not what it seems to be.
