= Daredevil =

A daredevil is a stunt performer.

Daredevil may also refer to:

=== Comics ===
- Daredevil (Lev Gleason Publications), a fictional 1940s superhero popularized by writer-artist Charles Biro
- Daredevil (Marvel Comics character), a Marvel comic book superhero
  - Daredevil (Marvel Comics series), the comic series about the Marvel character
    - Daredevil: The Man Without Fear, a graphic novel by Frank Miller
  - Daredevil (film), 2003, starring Ben Affleck as the Marvel character
    - Daredevil: The Album, the soundtrack album to the film
    - Daredevil (video game), based on the film
  - Daredevil (TV series), a 2015 Netflix series starring Charlie Cox as the Marvel
    - "Daredevil" (Daredevil episode)
  - Daredevil: Born Again, a Disney+ series with Charlie Cox reprising the titular role
    - Daredevil (Marvel Cinematic Universe), based on the Marvel Comics character, as portrayed by Charlie Cox
- The Daredevils, a Marvel UK comic

=== Film ===
- The Daredevil (1920 film), a lost American comedy western directed by and starring Tom Mix
- Daredevils, a 1928 Polish film directed by Leonard Buczkowski (Szaleńcy)
- The Daredevil, a 1931 German film

=== Gaming ===
- Daredevils (role-playing game), a 1982 pulp pen-and-paper role-playing game
- Daredevil Comet, a type of Prankster Comet from the video game Super Mario Galaxy

=== Literature ===
- Daredevil (novel), 1929, by Leslie Charteris
- Daredevil, a 1982 novel by Rosemary Carter
- Daredevil, a 2000 novel based on NASCAR Racers by Gene Hult, writing as J. E. Bright
- Daredevil, a novelization of the 2003 film by Greg Cox
- Daredevil, a 2015 novel by Nigel Hinton
- Daredevils (The Hardy Boys), a 2000 novel in the book series The Hardy Boys by Franklin W. Dixon
- Daredevils, a 2016 novel by Shawn Vestal
- The Daredevil, a 1916 novel by Maria Thompson Daviess
- The Daredevils, a 1976 novel by Paul White
- The Daredevils, a 2022 novel by Rob Buyea

=== Music ===
- Daredevils (band), formed by Bad Religion guitarist Brett Gurewitz
- Daredevil (Fu Manchu album), 1995
- Daredevil (Justin Rutledge album), 2014
- "Daredevil", a song from Fiona Apple's album The Idler Wheel...

== Sport ==
- Butte Daredevils, an American basketball team, active 2006–08
- Delhi Daredevils, an Indian cricket franchise, founded 2008
- Denver Daredevils, an American roller hockey team, active 1996
- Indianapolis Daredevils, an American soccer club, active 1974–79
- Outer Banks Daredevils, an American baseball team, founded 1997
