= Daredevil: The Man Without Fear =

1990s Miniseries by Frank Miller

Publication information
- Publisher: Marvel Comics
- Genre: Crime thriller; Neo-noir; Martial arts; Superhero
- Publication date: October 1993 - February 1994
- No. of issues: 5
- Main character: Daredevil

Creative team
- Written by: Frank Miller
- Artist: John Romita Jr.

Daredevil: The Man Without Fear is a 1993 five-issue superhero comic book miniseries starring Daredevil, written by Frank Miller, illustrated by John Romita Jr. and published by Marvel Comics.

== Plot ==
The series explores the origins of the hero Daredevil, whose name is Matthew Murdock. The first issue explores his childhood; the accident that caused his blindness and powers; and his father's death.

The series features many important characters in Murdock's life, including his mentor, Stick, his college flame, Elektra, his best friend, Foggy Nelson, and one of his primary nemeses, Kingpin, also known as Wilson Fisk. Throughout the comic, Murdock develops his abilities, struggles with anger, and becomes Daredevil.

== Reception ==
The comic has received mostly positive reviews since publication. In 2014, Comic Book Resources' Mark Ginocchio said the series had a strong reputation, adding that it was "so well-composed and filled with wonderfully nuanced scenes" it was hard to believe it came from the early 1990s, a period regarded by fans as a creative low point for the comic book industry.

== Legacy ==
In Daredevil/Deadpool Annual 1997, Typhoid Mary was revealed to be the girl who Murdock failed to save during his first night as Daredevil.
