= Frank Miller =

American writer, artist, and director (born 1957)

- Miller at a July 14, 2026 signing for his autobiography, Push the Wall, at Midtown Comics Grand Central in Manhattan
- Born: January 27, 1957 (age 69) Olney, Maryland, U.S.
- Areas: Writer; penciller; inker; film director
- Notable works: The Dark Knight Returns; Batman: Year One; Daredevil; Elektra; Wolverine; Ronin; 300; Sin City; Cursed
- Spouse: Lynn Varley (m. 1986; div. 2005)

Frank Miller (born January 27, 1957) is an American comic book creator, screenwriter, and director known for his comic book stories and graphic novels. He wrote Daredevil from 1979 to 1983, and again in 1986, with the Daredevil: Born Again arc. For Daredevil, he created the femme fatale Elektra and the ninja villains the Hand. Subsequently, he wrote influential Batman stories: The Dark Knight Returns (1986) and Batman: Year One (1987). He also wrote creator-owned series outside the major superhero franchises: Ronin (1983-1984), Sin City (1991-1992), and 300 (1998).

Miller is noted for combining film noir and manga influences in his comic art creations. He said: "I realized when I started Sin City that I found American and English comics to be too wordy, too constipated, and Japanese comics to be too empty. So I was attempting to do a hybrid." Miller has received every major comic book industry award, and in 2015 he was inducted into the Will Eisner Award Hall of Fame.

Miller's feature film work includes writing the scripts for the 1990s science fiction films RoboCop 2 and RoboCop 3, sharing directing duties with Robert Rodriguez on Sin City and Sin City: A Dame to Kill For, producing the film 300, and directing the film adaptation of The Spirit.

In July 2026, Miller's autobiography. titled Push the Wall: My Life, Writing, Drawing, and the Art of Storytelling, was published by Simon & Schuster, which described it as "part memoir, part master class for budding artists and writers."

== Early life ==
Miller was born in Olney, Maryland, on January 27, 1957, and raised in Montpelier, Vermont, the fifth of seven children of a nurse mother and a carpenter/electrician father. His family was Irish Catholic.

== Career ==
Miller grew up a comics fan; a letter he wrote to Marvel Comics was published in The Claws of the Cat #3 (April 1973). His first published work was at Western Publishing's Gold Key Comics imprint, received at the recommendation of comics artist Neal Adams, to whom a fledgling Miller, after moving to New York City, had shown samples and received much critique and occasional informal lessons. Though no published credits appear, he is tentatively credited with the three-page story "Royal Feast" in the licensed TV series comic book The Twilight Zone #84 (June 1978), by an unknown writer, and is credited with the five-page "Endless Cloud", also by an unknown writer, in the following issue (July 1978). By the time of the latter, Miller had his first confirmed credit in writer Wyatt Gwyon's six-page "Deliver Me From D-Day", inked by Danny Bulanadi, in Weird War Tales #64 (June 1978).

Former Marvel editor-in-chief Jim Shooter recalled Miller going to DC Comics after having broken in with "a small job from Western Publishing, I think. Thus emboldened, he went to DC, and after getting savaged by Joe Orlando, got in to see art director Vinnie Colletta, who recognized talent and arranged for him to get a one-page war-comic job." The Grand Comics Database does not list this job; there may have been a one-page DC story, or Shooter may have misremembered the page count or have been referring to the two-page story, by writer Roger McKenzie, as "Slowly, painfully, you dig your way from the cold, choking debris" in Weird War Tales #68 (October 1978). Other fledgling work at DC included the six-page "The Greatest Story Never Told", by writer Paul Kupperberg, in that same issue, and the five-page "The Edge of History", written by Elliot S. Maggin, in Unknown Soldier #219 (September 1978). His first work for Marvel Comics was penciling the 17-page story "The Master Assassin of Mars, Part 3" in John Carter, Warlord of Mars #18 (November 1978).

At Marvel, Miller settled in as a regular fill-in and cover artist, working on a variety of titles. One of these jobs was drawing Peter Parker, The Spectacular Spider-Man #27–28 (February–March 1979), which guest-starred Daredevil. At the time, sales of the Daredevil title were poor but Miller saw potential in "a blind protagonist in a purely visual medium", as he recalled in 2000. Miller went to writer and staffer Jo Duffy (a mentor-figure whom he called his "guardian angel" at Marvel) and she passed on his interest to editor-in-chief Jim Shooter to get Miller work on Daredevil's regular title. Shooter agreed and made Miller the new penciller on the title. As Miller recalled in 2008:

When I first showed up in New York, I showed up with a bunch of comics, a bunch of samples, of guys in trench coats and old cars and such. And [comics editors] said, 'Where are the guys in tights?' And I had to learn how to do it. But as soon as a title came along, when [Daredevil signature artist] Gene Colan left Daredevil, I realized it was my secret in to do crime comics with a superhero in them. And so I lobbied for the title and got it.

=== Daredevil and the early 1980s ===
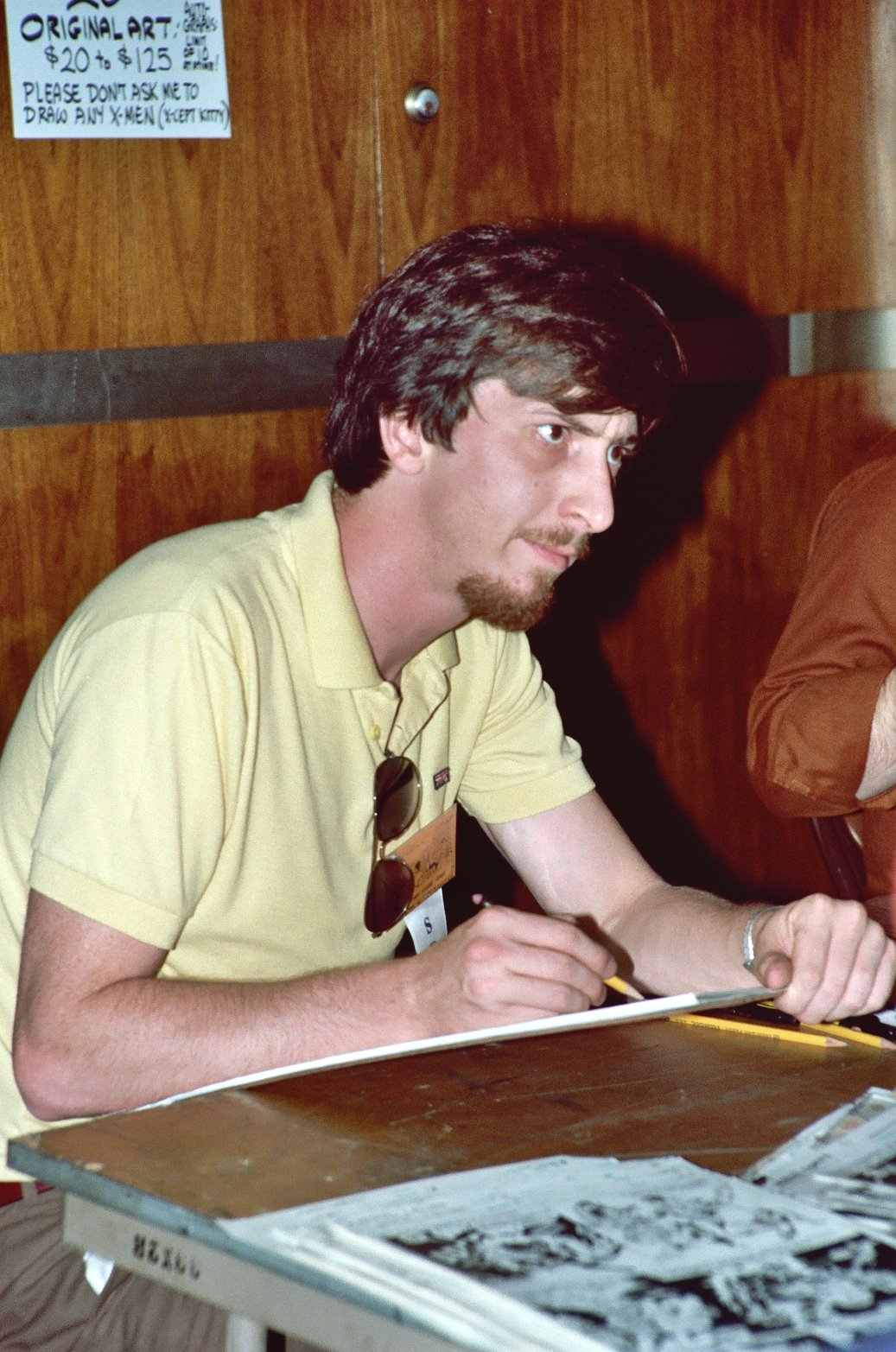
Miller at the 1982 Comic-Con

Daredevil #158 (May 1979), Miller's debut on that title, was the finale of an ongoing story written by Roger McKenzie and inked by Klaus Janson. After this issue, Miller became one of Marvel's rising stars. However, sales on Daredevil did not improve, Marvel's management continued to discuss cancellation, and Miller himself almost quit the series, as he disliked McKenzie's scripts. Miller's fortunes changed with the arrival of Denny O'Neil as editor. Realizing Miller's unhappiness with the series, and impressed by a backup story Miller had written, O'Neil moved McKenzie to another project so that Miller could try writing the series himself. Miller and O'Neil maintained a friendly working relationship throughout his run on the series. With issue #168 (Jan. 1981), Miller took over full duties as writer and penciller. Sales rose so swiftly that Marvel once again began publishing Daredevil monthly rather than bimonthly just three issues after Miller became its writer.

Issue #168 saw the first full appearance of the ninja mercenary Elektra—who became a popular character and star in a 2005 motion picture—although her first cover appearance was four months earlier on Miller's cover of The Comics Journal #58. Miller later wrote and drew a solo Elektra story in Bizarre Adventures #28 (Oct. 1981). He added a martial arts aspect to Daredevil's fighting skills, and introduced previously unseen characters who had played a major part in the character's youth: Stick, leader of the ninja clan the Chaste, who had been Murdock's sensei after he was blinded and a rival clan called the Hand.

Daredevil #168 (Jan. 1981), Elektra's debut. Cover art by Miller and Klaus Janson

Unable to handle both writing and penciling Daredevil on the new monthly schedule, Miller began increasingly relying on Janson for the artwork, sending him looser and looser pencils beginning with #173. By issue #185, Miller had virtually relinquished his role as Daredevil's artist, and he was providing only rough layouts for Janson to both pencil and ink, allowing Miller to focus on the writing.

Miller's work on Daredevil was characterized by darker themes and stories. This peaked when in #181 (April 1982) he had the assassin Bullseye kill Elektra, and Daredevil subsequently attempt to kill him. Miller finished his Daredevil run with issue #191 (February 1983), which he cited in a winter 1983 interview as the issue he is most proud of; by this time, he had transformed a second-tier character into one of Marvel's most popular. Additionally, Miller drew a short Batman Christmas story, "Wanted: Santa Claus – Dead or Alive", written by Dennis O'Neil for DC Special Series #21 (Spring 1980). This was his first professional experience with a character with which, like Daredevil, he became closely associated. At Marvel, O'Neil and Miller collaborated on two issues of The Amazing Spider-Man Annual. The 1980 Annual featured a team-up with Doctor Strange while the 1981 Annual showcased a meeting with the Punisher.

As penciller and co-plotter, Miller, together with writer Chris Claremont, produced the miniseries Wolverine #1–4 (Sept.-Dec. 1982), inked by Josef Rubinstein and spinning off from the popular X-Men title. Miller used this miniseries to expand on Wolverine's character. The series was a critical success and further cemented Miller's place as an industry star. His first creator-owned title was DC Comics' six-issue miniseries Ronin (1983–1984). In 1985, DC Comics named Miller as one of the honorees in the company's 50th-anniversary publication Fifty Who Made DC Great.

Miller was involved in a few unpublished projects in the early 1980s. A house advertisement for Doctor Strange appeared in Marvel Comics cover-dated February 1981. It stated "Watch for the new adventures of Earth's Sorcerer Supreme—as mystically conjured by Roger Stern and Frank Miller!". Miller's only contribution to the series was the cover for Doctor Strange #46 (April 1981). Other commitments prevented him from working on the series. Miller and Steve Gerber made a proposal to revamp DC's three biggest characters: Superman, Batman, and Wonder Woman, under a line called "Metropolis" and comics titled "Man of Steel" or "The Man of Steel", "Dark Knight" and "Amazon". However, this proposal was not accepted.

=== Batman: The Dark Knight Returns and the late 1980s ===
In 1986, DC Comics released the writer–penciller Miller's Batman: The Dark Knight Returns, a four-issue miniseries printed in what the publisher called "prestige format"—squarebound, rather than stapled; on heavy-stock paper rather than newsprint, and with cardstock rather than glossy-paper covers. It was inked by Klaus Janson and colored by Lynn Varley. The story tells how Batman retired after the death of the second Robin (Jason Todd) and, at age 55, returns to fight crime in a dark and violent future. Miller created a tough, gritty Batman, referring to him as "The Dark Knight" based upon his being called the "Darknight Detective" in some 1970s portrayals, although the nickname "Dark Knight" for Batman dates back to 1940. Released the same year as Alan Moore's and Dave Gibbons' DC miniseries Watchmen, it showcased a new form of more adult-oriented storytelling to both comics fans and a crossover mainstream audience. The Dark Knight Returns influenced the comic-book industry by heralding a new wave of darker characters. The trade paperback collection proved to be a big seller for DC and remains in print.

By this time, Miller had returned as the writer of Daredevil. Following his self-contained story "Badlands", penciled by John Buscema, in #219 (June 1985), he co-wrote #226 (Jan. 1986) with departing writer Dennis O'Neil. Then, with artist David Mazzucchelli, he crafted a seven-issue story arc that, like The Dark Knight Returns, similarly redefined and reinvigorated its main character. The storyline, "Daredevil: Born Again", in #227–233 (February–August 1986) chronicled the hero's Catholic background and the destruction and rebirth of his real-life identity, Manhattan attorney Matt Murdock, at the hands of Daredevil's nemesis, the crime lord Wilson Fisk, also known as the Kingpin. After completing the "Born Again" arc, Frank Miller intended to produce a two-part story with artist Walt Simonson but it was never completed and remains unpublished.

Miller and artist Bill Sienkiewicz produced the graphic novel Daredevil: Love and War in 1986. Featuring the character of the Kingpin, it indirectly bridges Miller's first run on Daredevil and Born Again by explaining the change in the Kingpin's attitude toward Daredevil. Miller and Sienkiewicz also produced the eight-issue miniseries Elektra: Assassin for Epic Comics. Set outside regular Marvel continuity, it featured a wild tale of cyborgs and ninjas, while expanding further on Elektra's background. Both of these projects were critically well received. Elektra: Assassin was praised for its bold storytelling, but neither it nor Daredevil: Love and War had the influence or reached as many readers as Dark Knight Returns or Born Again.

Miller's final major story in this period was in Batman issues 404–407 in 1987, another collaboration with Mazzucchelli. Titled Batman: Year One, this was Miller's version of the origin of Batman in which he retconned many details and adapted the story to fit his Dark Knight continuity. Proving to be hugely popular, this was as influential as Miller's previous work. A trade paperback released in 1988 remains in print, and is one of DC's best selling books. The story was adapted as an original animated film video in 2011.

Miller illustrated the covers for the first twelve issues of First Comics' English-language reprints of Kazuo Koike and Goseki Kojima's Lone Wolf and Cub. This helped bring Japanese manga to a wider Western audience. During this time, Miller (along with Marv Wolfman, Alan Moore, and Howard Chaykin) had been in dispute with DC Comics over a proposed ratings system for comics. Disagreeing with what he saw as censorship, Miller refused to do any further work for DC, and he took his future projects to the independent publisher Dark Horse Comics. From then on Miller was a major supporter of creator rights and became a major voice against censorship in comics.

=== The 1990s: Sin City and 300 ===
After announcing he intended to release his work only via the independent publisher Dark Horse Comics, Miller completed one final project for Epic Comics, the mature-audience imprint of Marvel Comics. Elektra Lives Again was a fully painted graphic novel written and drawn by Miller and colored by longtime partner Lynn Varley. Telling the story of the resurrection of Elektra from the dead and Daredevil's quest to find her, as well as showing Miller's will to experiment with new story-telling techniques.

1990 saw Miller and artist Geof Darrow start work on Hard Boiled, a three-issue miniseries. The title, a mix of violence and satire, was praised for Darrow's highly detailed art and Miller's writing. At the same time, Miller and artist Dave Gibbons produced Give Me Liberty, a four-issue miniseries for Dark Horse. Give Me Liberty was followed by sequel miniseries and specials expanding on the story of protagonist Martha Washington, an African-American woman in modern and near-future North America, all of which were written by Miller and drawn by Gibbons.

Miller wrote the scripts for the science fiction films RoboCop 2 and RoboCop 3, about a police cyborg. Neither was critically well received. In 2007, Miller stated that "There was a lot of interference in the writing process. It wasn't ideal. After working on the two Robocop movies, I really thought that was it for me in the business of film." Miller came into contact with the fictional cyborg once more, writing the comic-book miniseries RoboCop Versus The Terminator, with art by Walter Simonson. In 2003, Miller's screenplay for RoboCop 2 was adapted by Steven Grant for Avatar Press's Pulsaar imprint. Illustrated by Juan Jose Ryp, the series is called Frank Miller's RoboCop and contains plot elements that were divided between RoboCop 2 and RoboCop 3.

In 1991, Miller started work on his first Sin City story. Serialized in Dark Horse Presents #51–62, it proved to be another success, and the story was released in a trade paperback. This first Sin City "yarn" was rereleased in 1995 under the name The Hard Goodbye. Sin City proved to be Miller's main project for much of the remainder of the decade, as Miller told more Sin City stories within this noir world of his creation, in the process helping to revitalize the crime comics genre. Sin City proved artistically auspicious for Miller and again brought his work to a wider audience without comics. Miller lived in Los Angeles, California in the 1990s, which influenced Sin City. He later lived in the Hell's Kitchen neighborhood of New York City, which was also an influence.

Daredevil: The Man Without Fear was a five issue miniseries published by Marvel Comics in 1993. In this story, Miller and artist John Romita Jr. told Daredevil's origins differently from in the previous comics, and they provided additional detail to his beginnings. Miller also returned to superheroes by writing issue #11 of Todd McFarlane's Spawn, as well as the Spawn/Batman crossover for Image Comics.

In 1994, Miller became one of the founding members of the comic imprint Legend, under which many of his Sin City works were released via Dark Horse Comics. In 1995, Miller and Darrow collaborated again on Big Guy and Rusty the Boy Robot, published as a two-part miniseries by Dark Horse. In 1999, it became an animated series on Fox Kids.

Written and illustrated by Miller with painted colors by Varley, 300 was a 1998 comic-book miniseries, released as a hardcover collection in 1999, retelling the Battle of Thermopylae and the events leading up to it from the perspective of Leonidas of Sparta. 300 was particularly inspired by the 1962 film The 300 Spartans, a movie that Miller watched as a young boy.

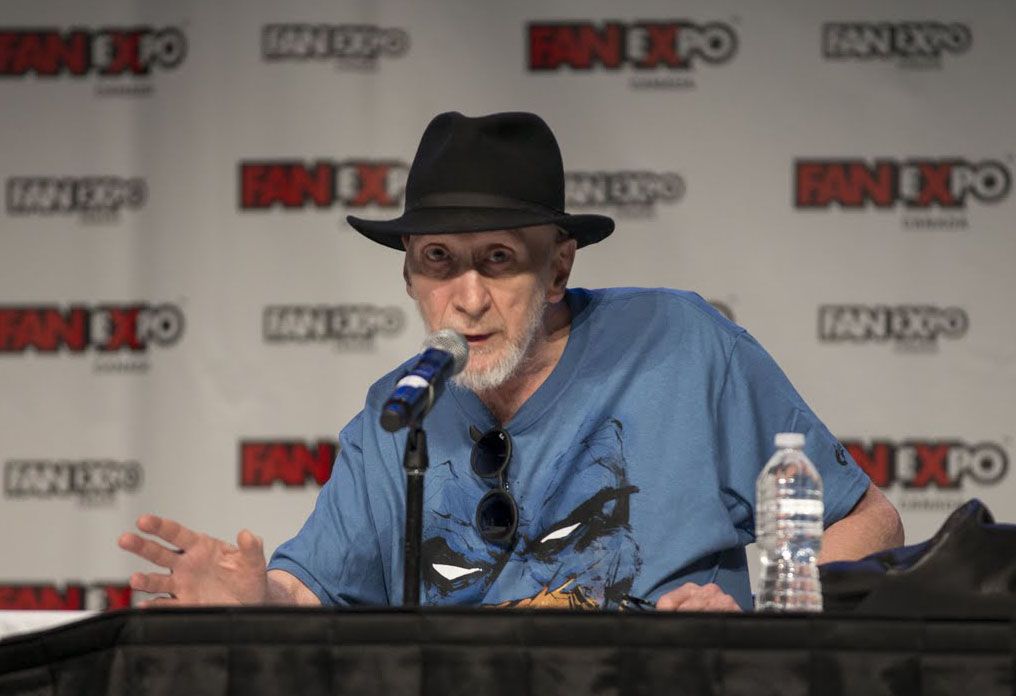
Miller during a The Dark Knight III: The Master Race panel held at Fan Expo 2016 in Toronto, Canada

=== Batman: The Dark Knight Strikes Again and 2000–2019 ===
He was one of the artists on the Superman and Batman: World's Funnest one-shot written by Evan Dorkin published in 2000. Miller moved back to Hell's Kitchen by 2001 and was creating Batman: The Dark Knight Strikes Again as the 9/11 terrorist attacks occurred about four miles from that neighborhood. His differences with DC Comics put aside, he saw the sequel initially released as a three-issue miniseries, and though it sold well, it received a mixed to negative reception. Miller also returned to writing Batman in 2005, taking on the writing duties of All Star Batman & Robin, the Boy Wonder, a series set inside of what Miller describes as the "Dark Knight Universe," and drawn by Jim Lee. All Star Batman & Robin, the Boy Wonder also received largely negative reviews.

Miller's previous attitude towards movie adaptations was to change after Robert Rodriguez made a short film based on a story from Miller's Sin City entitled "The Customer is Always Right". Miller was pleased with the result, leading to him and Rodriguez directing a full-length film, Sin City using Miller's original comics panels as storyboards. The film was released in the U.S. on April 1, 2005. The film's success brought renewed attention to Miller's Sin City projects. Similarly, a 2006 film adaptation of 300, directed by Zack Snyder, brought new attention to Miller's original comic book work. A sequel to the film, Sin City: A Dame to Kill For, based on Miller's second Sin City series and co-directed by Miller and Robert Rodriguez, was released in theaters on August 22, 2014. Miller himself then wrote and directed the 2008 film adaptation of The Spirit to poor critical and commercial reception.

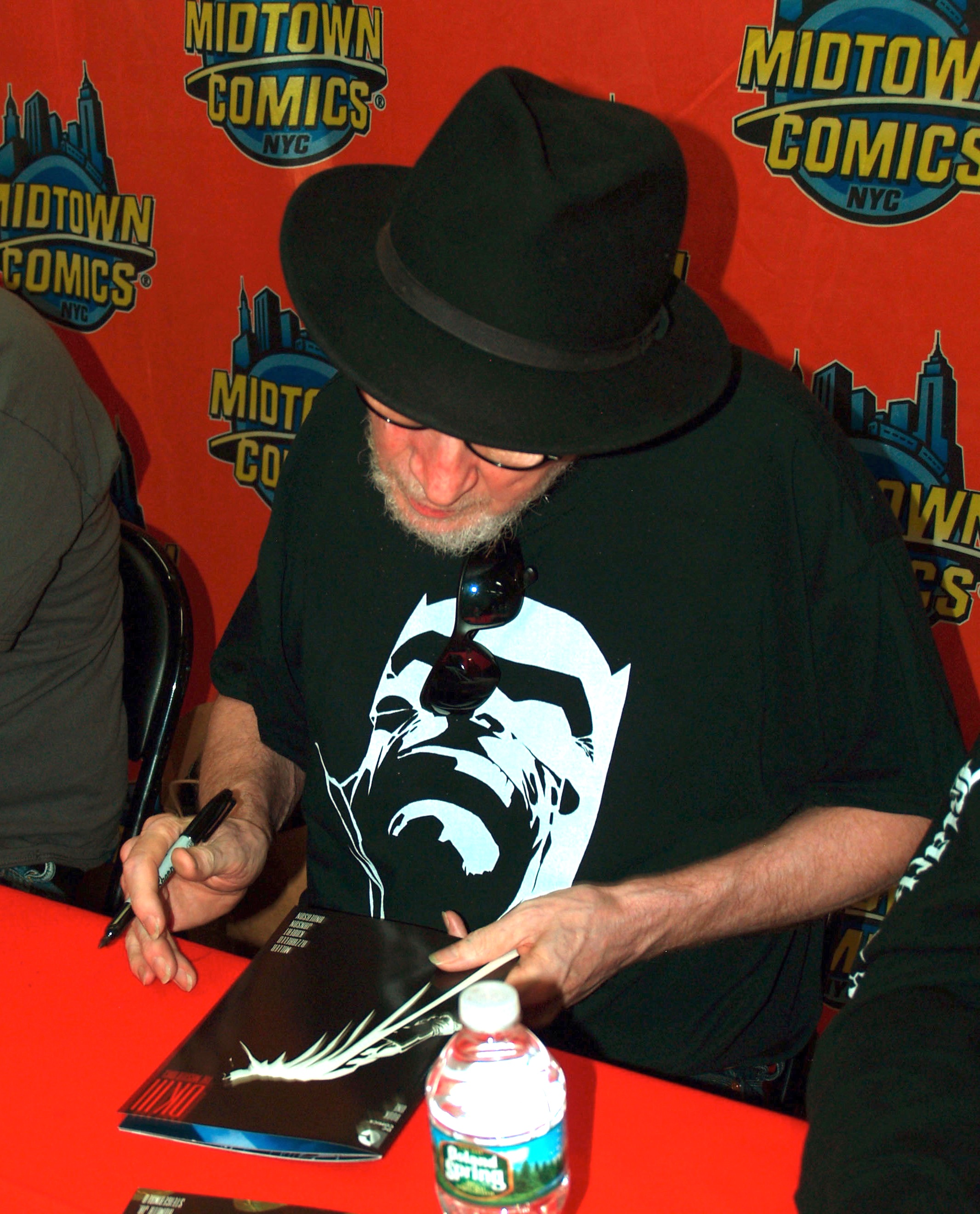
Miller signing a copy of The Dark Knight III: The Master Race at Midtown Comics

In July 2011, while at San Diego Comic-Con promoting his upcoming graphic novel Holy Terror, in which the protagonist hero fights Al-Qaeda terrorists, Miller made a remark about Islamic terrorism and Islam, saying, "I was raised Catholic and I could tell you a lot about the Spanish Inquisition, but the mysteries of the Catholic Church elude me. And I could tell you a lot about Al-Qaeda, but the mysteries of Islam elude me too."

In November 2011, Miller posted remarks pertaining to the Occupy Wall Street movement on his blog, calling it "nothing but a pack of louts, thieves, and rapists, fed by Woodstock-era nostalgia and putrid false righteousness." He said of the movement, "Wake up, pond scum. America is at war against a ruthless enemy. Maybe, between bouts of self-pity and all the other tasty tidbits of narcissism you've been served up in your sheltered, comfy little worlds, you've heard terms like al-Qaeda and Islamicism." Miller's statement was criticised by fellow comic writer Alan Moore. In a 2018 interview, Miller backed away from his comments saying that he "wasn't thinking clearly" when he made them and alluded to a very dark time in his life during which they were made.

On July 10, 2015, at San Diego Comic-Con, Miller was inducted into the Eisner Awards Hall of Fame. From 2015 to 2017, DC released a nine-issue, bimonthly sequel to The Dark Knight Returns and The Dark Knight Strikes Again, titled The Dark Knight III: The Master Race. Miller co-wrote it with Brian Azzarello, and Andy Kubert and Klaus Janson were the artists. Issue one was the top-selling comic of November 2015, moving an estimated 440,234 copies. In 2016, Miller and Azzarello also co-wrote the graphic novel, The Dark Knight Returns: The Last Crusade with art by John Romita Jr. and Peter Steigerwald. From April to August 2018, Dark Horse Comics published monthly Miller's five-issue miniseries sequel to 300, Xerxes: The Fall of the House of Darius and the Rise of Alexander, which marked his first work as both writer and artist comics creation since Holy Terror.

In 2017 Miller announced he was writing a Superman: Year One project with artwork by John Romita Jr. The three-issue series was released by DC Black Label from June to October 2019 and received mixed reviews. Simon & Schuster Children's Publishing published his and author Tom Wheeler's young-adult novel Cursed, about the King Arthur legend from the point of view of the Lady of the Lake in October 2019. In December 2019, DC released Dark Knight Returns: The Golden Child, the fifth series in The Dark Knight Returns universe to mixed reviews. It is written by Miller with artwork by Rafael Grampa.

=== The 2020s ===
Miller signing copies of his autobiography, Push the Wall, at Midtown Comics Grand Central in Manhattan on July 14, 2026, the day the book was released.

In July 2020, Netflix released a 10-episode series based on Cursed with Miller and Wheeler serving as both creators and executive producers.

On April 28, 2022, it was reported that Miller was launching an American comic book publishing company titled Frank Miller Presents (FMP), of which Miller would serve as president and editor-in-chief, and Dan DiDio as publisher and chief operating officer Silenn Thomas. According to The Hollywood Reporter, FMP intended to produce between two and four titles per year, with Miller's initial contributions to include Sin City 1858 and Ronin Book Two. As of November 2023, FMP was focusing its efforts on the Ronin sequel and Pandora, a fantasy adventure series produced together with The Kubert School that Miller described as "look[ing] like a children's book, but it's also a dark fairytale".

The documentary film Frank Miller: American Genius premiered on June 6, 2024, at the Angelika Film Center in New York City. The event featured a live introduction with Miller, moderated by author Neil Gaiman. On June 10, the film screened in Cinemark theaters across the U.S. for one day only.

On July 14 2026, Miller's autobiography, titled Push the Wall: My Life, Writing, Drawing, and the Art of Storytelling, was published by Simon & Schuster, under its imprint Saga Press. The 224-page hardcover is described by the publisher as "part memoir, part master class for budding artists and writers". In addition to recounting the notable events of Miller's life and career, beginning with his move from Vermont to New York City at age 17, the book also includes sixteen autobiographical lessons for aspiring comics creators, and over a dozen illustrations by Miller, who also provided the art for the cover. Canongate publisher-at-large Francis Bickmore acquired the publication rights for the book in the United Kingdom and Commonwealth (excluding Canada). Among the rules of storytelling Miller imparts to readers in the book is "Tell whoever's watching who the hero is, and then get that hero into trouble right quick." In promoting the book, Miller was interviewed at the Library of Congress' National Book Festival on August 22, 2026.

On October 9, 2026, at the 38th Harvey Awards ceremony, Miller was one of a group of creators associated with Batman, who along with Klaus Janson, David Mazzucchelli, Jerry Robinson, Dick Sprang and former DC Comics president and publisher Jenette Kahn, was inducted into the Harvey Awards Hall of Fame.

== Legal issues ==
In October 2012, Joanna Gallardo-Mills, who began working for Miller as an executive coordinator in November 2008, filed suit against Miller in Manhattan for discrimination and "mental anguish", stating that Miller's former girlfriend, Kimberly Cox, created a hostile work environment for Gallardo-Mills in Miller and Cox's Hell's Kitchen living and work space.

In July 2020, producer Stephen L'Heureux, who worked on Sin City: A Dame to Kill For, filed a $25 million defamation and economic interference lawsuit against Miller and fellow producer Silenn Thomas. L'Heureux alleged the pair had repeatedly made, "false, misleading and defamatory statements" about L'Heureux's ownership of the developmental rights of Sin City and Hard Boiled to Skydance Media CEO David Ellison and other Skydance executives and prevented the creation of a film adaptation of Hard Boiled and a TV series based on Sin City. Miller's attorney Allen Grodsky denied the allegation stating, "The claims asserted in Mr. L'Heureux's lawsuit are baseless, and we will be aggressively defending this lawsuit."

== Style and influence ==
Marv walking through the rain in The Hard Goodbye cover by Frank Miller, illustrating Miller's film noir-influenced visual style

Although still conforming to traditional comic book styles, Miller infused his first issue of Daredevil with his own film noir style. Miller sketched the roofs of New York in an attempt to give his Daredevil art an authentic feel not commonly seen in superhero comics at the time. One journalist commented:

Daredevil's New York, under Frank's run, became darker and more dangerous than the Spider-Man New York he'd seemingly lived in before. New York City itself, particularly Daredevil's Hell's Kitchen neighborhood, became as much a character as the shadowy crimefighter; the stories often took place on the rooftop level, with water towers, pipes and chimneys jutting out to create a skyline reminiscent of German Expressionism's dramatic edges and shadows.

Ronin shows some of the strongest influences of manga and bande dessinée on Miller's style, both in the artwork and narrative style. Sin City was drawn in black and white to emphasize its film noir origins. Miller has said he opposes naturalism in comic art: "People are attempting to bring a superficial reality to superheroes which is rather stupid. They work best as the flamboyant fantasies they are. I mean, these are characters that are broad and big. I don't need to see sweat patches under Superman's arms. I want to see him fly."

Miller considers the Argentinian comic book artist Alberto Breccia as one of his personal mentors, even declaring that (regarding modernity in comics), "It all started with Breccia". In that same regard, Miller's work in Sin City has been analyzed by South American writers and artists –as well as European critics like Yexus– as being based or inspired in Breccia's groundbreaking style, especially regarding the latter's chiaroscuros and strong use of stark black-and-white technique.

Miller has cited a wide range of aesthetic inspirations, both inside and outside the comics medium; these include Will Eisner, Bernard Krigstein, Ayn Rand, Kazuo Koike, Clint Eastwood films and particularly Dirty Harry, samurai cinema, kung fu films, and manga, including the then-untranslated manga Kozure Okami.

=== Appraisal ===
Daredevil: Born Again and The Dark Knight Returns were both critical successes and influential on subsequent generations of creators to the point of being considered classics of the medium. Batman: Year One was also met with praise for its gritty style, while comics including Ronin, 300 and Sin City were also successful, cementing Miller's place as a legend of comic books. However, later material such as Batman: The Dark Knight Strikes Again received mixed reviews. In particular, All Star Batman and Robin the Boy Wonder was widely considered a sign of Miller's creative decline.

Fellow comic book writer Alan Moore has described Miller's work from Sin City-onward as homophobic and misogynistic, despite praising his early Batman and Daredevil material. Moore previously penned a flattering introduction to an early collected edition of The Dark Knight Returns, and the two have remained friends. Moore has praised Miller's realistic use of minimal dialogue in fight scenes, which "move very fast, flowing from image to image with the speed of a real-life conflict, unimpeded by the reader having to stop to read a lot of accompanying text".

Miller's graphic novel Holy Terror was accused of being anti-Islamic. Miller later said that he regretted Holy Terror, saying, "I don't want to wipe out chapters of my own biography. But I'm not capable of that book again."

Miller's film adaptation of Sin City was well received by audiences and critics. On the review aggregator Rotten Tomatoes, the film holds an approval rating of 77% based on 254 reviews, with an average rating of 7.50/10. The website's critical consensus reads: "Visually groundbreaking and terrifically violent, Sin City brings the dark world of Frank Miller's graphic novel to vivid life." His 2008 adaptation of The Spirit received generally negative reviews.

== Personal life ==
Miller was married to colorist Lynn Varley from 1986 to 2005. She colored many of his most acclaimed works (from Ronin in 1984 through 300 in 1998) and the backgrounds to the 2006 movie 300. Miller has been romantically linked to Kimberly Halliburton Cox, who had a cameo in The Spirit (2008).

In response to claims that his comics are conservative, Miller said in 2015, "I'm not a conservative. I'm a libertarian."

Miller is a recovering alcoholic and states that he used alcohol heavily in his early career to free him from inhibitions and increase his creative output.

Miller has described himself as an atheist.

== Awards and nominations ==
Inkpot Awards

- Received an Inkpot Award – 1981

Kirby Awards

- Best Single Issue –
  - 1986 Daredevil #227 "Apocalypse" (Marvel)
  - 1987 Batman: The Dark Knight Returns #1 "The Dark Knight Returns" (DC)
- Best Writer/Artist (single or team) – 1986 Frank Miller and David Mazzucchelli, for Daredevil: Born Again (Marvel)
- Best Graphic Album, 1987 Batman: The Dark Knight Returns (DC)
- Best Art Team – 1987 Frank Miller, Klaus Janson and Lynn Varley, for Batman: The Dark Knight Returns (DC)

Eisner Awards

- Best Writer/Artist —
  - 1991 for Elektra Lives Again (Marvel)
  - 1993 for Sin City (Dark Horse)
  - 1999 for 300 (Dark Horse)
- Best Graphic Album: New – 1991 Elektra Lives Again (Marvel)
- Best Finite Series/Limited Series —
  - 1991 Give Me Liberty (Dark Horse)
  - 1995 Sin City: A Dame to Kill For (Dark Horse/Legend)
  - 1996 Sin City: The Big Fat Kill (Dark Horse/Legend)
  - 1999 300 (Dark Horse)
- Best Graphic Album: Reprint —
  - 1993 Sin City (Dark Horse)
  - 1998 Sin City: That Yellow Bastard (Dark Horse)
- Best Artist/Penciller/Inker or Penciller/Inker Team – 1993 for Sin City (Dark Horse)
- Best Short Story – 1995 "The Babe Wore Red", in Sin City: The Babe Wore Red and Other Stories (Dark Horse/Legend)
- Eisner Awards Hall Of Fame, 2015

Harvey Awards

- Best Continuing or Limited Series –
  - 1996 Sin City (Dark Horse)
  - 1999 300 (Dark Horse)
- Best Graphic Album of Original Work – 1998 Sin City: Family Values (Dark Horse)
- Best Domestic Reprint Project – 1997 Batman: The Dark Knight Returns, 10th Anniversary Edition (DC)
- 2026 inductee into the Harvey Awards Hall of Fame

Eagle Award

- Favourite Comicbook Pencil Artist—1983
- Favourite Comicbook Writer: U.S.—1986
- Roll of Honour—1987
- Favourite Comicbook Pencil Artist—1987
- Favourite Comic Album: U.S.—1987 Batman: The Dark Knight Returns (DC)
- Favourite Cover: U.S.—1987 Batman: The Dark Knight Returns #1 (DC)
- Favourite Comic Album: US—1988 Daredevil: Love and War (DC)
- Favourite Black & White Comicbook—2000 Hell and Back (A Sin City Love Story) (Dark Horse)
- Favourite Comics Writer/Artist—2002
- Favourite Comics-Related Book—2006 Eisner/Miller (Dark Horse)
- Favourite Comics Writer/Artist—2012

UK Comic Art Award

- Best Original Graphic Novel/One-Shot—1991 Elektra Lives Again (Epic Comics)
- Best Writer/Artist—1992
- Best Writer/Artist—1993
- Best Graphic Novel Collection—1993 Sin City
- Best Writer/Artist—1994

Cannes Film Festival

- Palme d'Or – 2005 (nominated) Sin City (Dimension Films)

Scream Awards

- The Comic-Con Icon Award – 2006

== Bibliography ==
=== DC Comics ===
- Weird War Tales (as artist, anthology):
  - "Deliver Me from D-Day" (written by Wyatt Gwyon, in #64, 1978)
  - "The Greatest Story Never Told" (written by Paul Kupperberg) and "The Day After Doomsday" (written by Roger McKenzie, in #68, 1978)
- Unknown Soldier #219: "The Edge of History" (as artist, written by Elliot S. Maggin, co-feature, 1978)
- Batman:
  - The Complete Frank Miller Batman (hc, 288 pages, Longmeadow Press, 1989, ISBN 0-6814-0969-X) collects:
    - DC Special Series #21: "Wanted: Santa Claus—Dead or Alive!" (as artist, written by Dennis O'Neil, anthology, 1980)
      - Also collected in Batman: The Greatest Stories Ever Told Volume 1 (tpb, 192 pages, 2005, ISBN 1-4012-0444-9)
      - Also collected in Batman: A Celebration of 75 Years (hc, 432 pages, 2014, ISBN 1-4012-4758-X)
    - Batman: The Dark Knight #1–4 (as writer/artist, 1986) also collected as Batman: The Dark Knight Returns (hc, 200 pages, 1987, ISBN 0-9302-8915-3; tpb, 1987, ISBN 0-9302-8913-7)
      - Collected alongside its sequel series Batman: The Dark Knight Strikes Again in oversized format as Absolute Dark Knight (hc, 512 pages, 2006, ISBN 1-4012-1079-1)
      - A black-and-white version of the series was published as Batman Noir: The Dark Knight Returns (hc, 208 pages, 2015, ISBN 1-4012-5514-0)
    - Batman #404–407: "Year One" (as writer, drawn by David Mazzucchelli, 1987) also collected as Batman: Year One (hc, 96 pages, 1988, ISBN 0-9302-8932-3; tpb, 1988, ISBN 0-9302-8933-1)
      - A version of the story with "remastered" coloring was published as Batman: Year One — The Deluxe Edition (hc, 144 pages, 2005, ISBN 1-4012-0690-5; tpb, 2007, ISBN 1-4012-0752-9)
      - Both the remastered and the original versions of the coloring were published in oversized format as Absolute Batman: Year One (hc, 224 pages, 2016, ISBN 1-4012-4379-7)
  - Fanboy #5 (as artist, two-page sequence parodying The Dark Knight Returns in a story written by Mark Evanier, 1999) collected in Fanboy (tpb, 144 pages, 2001, ISBN 1-56389-724-5)
  - Superman and Batman: World's Funnest (as artist, three-page sequence parodying The Dark Knight Returns in a story written by Evan Dorkin, one-shot, Elseworlds, 2000)
    - Collected in World's Funnest (tpb, 296 pages, 2016, ISBN 1-4012-6108-6)
    - Collected in Elseworlds: Justice League Volume 3 (tpb, 432 pages, 2019, ISBN 1-40128-791-3)
  - The Dark Knight Strikes Again #1–3 (as writer/artist, 2001–2002) collected as Batman: The Dark Knight Strikes Again (hc, 256 pages, 2003, ISBN 1-56389-844-6; tpb, 2004, ISBN 1-56389-929-9)
    - Collected alongside its prequel series Batman: The Dark Knight Returns in oversized format as Absolute Dark Knight (hc, 512 pages, 2006, ISBN 1-4012-1079-1)
    - A black-and-white version of the series was published as Batman Noir: The Dark Knight Strikes Again (hc, 248 pages, 2018, ISBN 1-4012-7804-3)
  - All-Star Batman and Robin, the Boy Wonder #1–10 (as writer, drawn by Jim Lee, DC All-Star, 2005–2008)
    - Issues #11 and 12 were solicited for June and August of 2008 respectively (later re-solicited for November and December of the same year), but ultimately not published.
    - The conclusion of the story in the form of a six-issue limited series titled Dark Knight: Boy Wonder was announced for publication in 2011, but also failed to materialize.
    - Issues #1–9 are collected as All-Star Batman and Robin, the Boy Wonder Volume 1 (hc, 240 pages, 2008, ISBN 1-4012-1681-1; tpb, 2009, ISBN 1-4012-2008-8)
    - The entire series is collected in oversized format as Absolute All-Star Batman and Robin, the Boy Wonder (hc, 304 pages, 2014, ISBN 1-4012-4763-6)
  - Holy Terror, Batman! (as writer/artist, graphic novel — announced in 2006, turned into an original story starring "The Fixer" sometime around 2010 and released via another publisher in 2011)
  - Batman: Odyssey (written and drawn by Neal Adams; Miller was attached to the project as dialogue writer during the initial announcement, but abandoned it for undisclosed reasons)
  - The Dark Knight III (co-written by Miller and Brian Azzarello):
    - Batman: The Dark Knight — The Master Race (hc, 392 pages, 2017, ISBN 1-4012-6513-8; tpb, 2018, ISBN 1-4012-8431-0) collects:
      - The Dark Knight III: The Master Race #1–9 (drawn by Andy Kubert, 2016–2017)
      - Dark Knight Universe Presents (series of 12-page mini-comics):
        - The Atom (drawn by Miller, originally published as an insert in issue #1, 2016)
        - Wonder Woman (drawn by Eduardo Risso, originally published as an insert in issue #2, 2016)
        - Green Lantern (drawn by John Romita, Jr., originally published as an insert in issue #3, 2016)
        - Batgirl (drawn by Miller, originally published as an insert in issue #4, 2016)
        - Lara (drawn by Miller, originally published as an insert in issue #5, 2016)
        - World's Finest (drawn by Miller, originally published as an insert in issue #6, 2016)
        - Strange Adventures (drawn by Miller, originally published as an insert in issue #7, 2017)
        - Detective Comics (drawn by Miller, originally published as an insert in issue #8, 2017)
        - Action Comics (drawn by Miller, originally published as an insert in issue #9, 2017)
    - The Dark Knight Returns: The Last Crusade (drawn by John Romita, Jr., one-shot, 2016)
  - The Dark Knight Returns: The Golden Child (as writer, drawn by Rafael Grampá, one-shot, DC Black Label, 2019)
  - Dark Knight: Carrie Kelley (as writer, drawn by Ben Caldwell — unreleased graphic novel, initially announced in 2018, reportedly completed as of 2021)
- Ronin #1–6 (as writer/artist, 1983) collected as Ronin (tpb, 302 pages, 1987, ISBN 0-446-38674-X; Absolute Edition, 328 pages, 2008, ISBN 1-4012-1908-X)
- Superman:
  - Superman #400: "The Living Legends of Superman (Part Three)" (as artist, four-page sequence in the anniversary issue written by Elliot S. Maggin, 1984)
    - Collected in Superman: The Greatest Stories Ever Told Volume 2 (tpb, 192 pages, 2006, ISBN 1-4012-0956-4)
    - Collected in Superman: A Celebration of 75 Years (hc, 384 pages, 2013, ISBN 1-4012-4704-0)
  - Superman: Year One #1–3 (as writer, drawn by John Romita, Jr., DC Black Label, 2019) collected as Superman: Year One (hc, 216 pages, 2019, ISBN 1-4012-9137-6; tpb, 2025, ISBN 1-7995-0177-9)
- Orion #3: "Tales of the New Gods: Nativity" (as artist, with Walt Simonson, co-feature, 2000)
  - Collected in Orion by Walter Simonson Omnibus (hc, 752 pages, 2015, ISBN 1-4012-5535-3)
  - Collected in Orion by Walter Simonson Book One (tpb, 368 pages, 2018, ISBN 1-401-27487-0)
- Wonder Woman: Bondage (as writer, unproduced series — to be drawn by Bill Sienkiewicz)

=== Marvel Comics ===
- John Carter, Warlord of Mars #18: "The Master Assassin of Mars: Chapter Three" (as artist, written by Chris Claremont, 1978)
  - Collected by Dark Horse in Edgar Rice Burroughs' John Carter of Mars: Warlord of Mars (tpb, 632 pages, 2011, ISBN 1-59582-692-0)
  - Collected by Marvel in John Carter, Warlord of Mars Omnibus (hc, 624 pages, 2012, ISBN 0-7851-5990-8)
- Marvel Universe by Frank Miller Omnibus (hc, 464 pages, 2018, ISBN 1-30291-277-1) collects:
  - Spider-Man:
    - The Spectacular Spider-Man #27–28 (as artist, written by Bill Mantlo, 1979)
      - Also collected in The Complete Frank Miller Spider-Man (hc, 208 pages, 2002, ISBN 0-7851-0899-8)
      - Also collected in Daredevil by Frank Miller Omnibus Companion (hc, 608 pages, 2008, ISBN 0-7851-2676-7)
      - Also collected in Daredevil by Frank Miller and Klaus Janson Volume 1 (tpb, 336 pages, 2008, ISBN 0-78513-473-5)
      - Also collected in Spider-Man: The Original Clone Saga (tpb, 408 pages, 2011, ISBN 0-7851-5523-6)
    - The Amazing Spider-Man (as artist, written by Dennis O'Neil):
      - "The Book of the Vishanti" (in Annual #14, 1980)
        - Also collected in The Complete Frank Miller Spider-Man (hc, 208 pages, 2002, ISBN 0-7851-0899-8)
        - Also collected in Spider-Man/Doctor Strange: The Way to Dusty Death (tpb, 280 pages, 2017, ISBN 1-30290-701-8)
        - Also collected in The Amazing Spider-Man: Spider-Man — Threat or Menace? (tpb, 480 pages, 2026, ISBN 1-3029-6049-0)
        - Also collected in Spider-Man: Strange Adventures (tpb, 176 pages, 1996, ISBN 0-7851-0221-3)
      - "Spider-Man: Threat or Menace?" (drawn by Klaus Janson from Miller's layouts, in Annual #15, 1981)
        - Also collected in The Complete Frank Miller Spider-Man (hc, 208 pages, 2002, ISBN 0-7851-0899-8)
        - Also collected in The Punisher: Back to the War Omnibus (hc, 586 pages, 2017, ISBN 1-3029-0823-5)
        - Also collected in The Amazing Spider-Man: Spider-Man — Threat or Menace? (tpb, 480 pages, 2026, ISBN 1-3029-6049-0)
        - Also collected in Spider-Man's Greatest Team-Ups (tpb, 176 pages, 1996, ISBN 0-7851-0203-5)
    - Marvel Team-Up Annual #4: "Power Play!" (as writer, drawn by Herb Trimpe, 1981)
      - Also collected in The Complete Frank Miller Spider-Man (hc, 208 pages, 2002, ISBN 0-7851-0899-8)
      - Also collected in Luke Cage: Avenger (tpb, 200 pages, 2016, ISBN 1-3029-0194-X)
  - Marvel Two-in-One #51: "Full House—Dragons High!" (as artist, written by Peter B. Gillis, 1979)
    - Also collected in Ms. Marvel: The Woman Who Fell to Earth (tpb, 376 pages, 2019, ISBN 1-3029-1802-8)
    - Also collected in Marvel Two-in-One: Remembrance of Things Past (tpb, 440 pages, 2025, ISBN 1-3029-5564-0)
  - Marvel Spotlight vol. 2 #8: "Planet Where Time Stood Still!" (as artist, written by Mike W. Barr from a plot by Dick Riley, 1980)
  - Marvel Preview #23 (Bizarre Adventures #2): "Final Warning" (as artist, written by Lynn Graeme, anthology, Curtis Magazines, 1980)
  - X-Men:
    - Marvel Team-Up #100: "Karma!" (as artist, written by Chris Claremont, 1980)
      - Also collected in The Complete Frank Miller Spider-Man (hc, 208 pages, 2002, ISBN 0-7851-0899-8)
      - Also collected in Fantastic Four/Spider-Man Classic (tpb, 152 pages, 2005, ISBN 0-785-11803-9)
      - Also collected in New Mutants: Renewal (tpb, 520 pages, 2017, ISBN 1-3029-0365-9)
      - Also collected in New Mutants Omnibus Volume 1 (hc, 1,272 pages, 2020, ISBN 1-3029-2688-8)
    - Wolverine #1–4 (as artist, written by Chris Claremont, 1982)
      - Also collected as Wolverine by Chris Claremont and Frank Miller (tpb, 96 pages, 1987, ISBN 0-87135-277-X; hc, 144 pages, 2007, ISBN 0-7851-2329-6)
      - Also collected in The Best of Wolverine Volume 1 (hc, 320 pages, 2004, ISBN 0-7851-1370-3)
      - Also collected in Wolverine Omnibus Volume 1 (hc, 1,064 pages, 2009, ISBN 0-7851-3665-7)
      - Also collected in The Uncanny X-Men Omnibus Volume 3 (hc, 1,056 pages, 2016, ISBN 0-785-19923-3)
  - Power Man and Iron Fist #76: "Death Scream of the Warhawk!" (as artist, co-written by Mike W. Barr and Chris Claremont, co-feature, 1981)
    - Miller only contributed a two-page sequence to the story, the rest of which is drawn by Rudy Nebres.
    - Also collected in Power Man and Iron Fist: Heroes for Hire (tpb, 448 pages, 2015, ISBN 0-7851-9296-4)
  - The Incredible Hulk Annual #11: "Unus Unchained" (as artist, written by Mary Jo Duffy, co-feature, 1982)
  - Marvel Fanfare #18: "Home Fires!" (as artist, co-written by Roger Stern and Roger McKenzie, anthology, 1984)
    - Also reprinted in Captain America: Red, White & Blue (hc, 192 pages, 2002, ISBN 0-7851-1033-X; sc, 2007, ISBN 0-7851-2897-2)
    - Also collected in Captain America: Society of Serpents (tpb, 432 pages, 2014, ISBN 0-7851-8896-7)
- Daredevil:
  - Daredevil #158–161, 163–191 (as artist until issue #167 and writer/artist from then on, 1979–1983)
    - Issues #158–161 and 163–166 were written by Roger McKenzie; issue #167 was written by David Michelinie.
    - McKenzie's unproduced script for issue #167 was reworked by Miller into the storyline published in issues #183–184.
    - Issues #185–190 were drawn by Klaus Janson from Miller's layouts.
    - Miller's entire first run on the series has been collected in numerous formats as:
      - Daredevil Visionaries: Frank Miller Volume 1 (collects #158–161 and 163–167, tpb, 176 pages, 2000, ISBN 0-7851-0757-6)
      - Daredevil Visionaries: Frank Miller Volume 2 (collects #168–182, tpb, 356 pages, 2001, ISBN 0-7851-0771-1)
      - Daredevil Visionaries: Frank Miller Volume 3 (collects #183–191, tpb, 192 pages, 2001, ISBN 0-7851-0802-5)
      - Daredevil by Frank Miller and Klaus Janson Omnibus (collects #158–161 and 163–191, hc, 840 pages, 2007, ISBN 0-7851-2343-1)
      - Daredevil by Frank Miller and Klaus Janson Volume 1 (collects #158–161 and 163–172, tpb, 336 pages, 2008, ISBN 0-78513-473-5)
      - Daredevil by Frank Miller and Klaus Janson Volume 2 (collects #173–184, tpb, 336 pages, 2008, ISBN 0-7851-3474-3)
      - Daredevil by Frank Miller and Klaus Janson Volume 3 (includes #185–191, tpb, 336 pages, 2009, ISBN 0-7851-3475-1)
  - What If...? (as writer/artist, anthology):
    - "Matt Murdock, Agent of... S.H.I.E.L.D." (scripted by Miller from a plot by Miller and Mike W. Barr, in #28, 1981)
      - Collected in Daredevil Visionaries: Frank Miller Volume 3 (tpb, 192 pages, 2001, ISBN 0-7851-0802-5)
      - Collected in Daredevil by Frank Miller and Klaus Janson Omnibus (hc, 840 pages, 2007, ISBN 0-7851-2343-1)
      - Collected in Daredevil by Frank Miller and Klaus Janson Volume 3 (tpb, 336 pages, 2009, ISBN 0-7851-3475-1)
      - Collected in What If...?: The Complete Collection Volume 3 (tpb, 488 pages, 2019, ISBN 1-3029-2274-2)
    - "What If Daredevil Were Deaf Instead of Blind?" (one-page joke strip, in #34, 1982)
      - Collected in Daredevil by Frank Miller and Klaus Janson Omnibus (hc, 840 pages, 2007, ISBN 0-7851-2343-1)
      - Collected in Daredevil by Frank Miller and Klaus Janson Volume 3 (tpb, 336 pages, 2009, ISBN 0-7851-3475-1)
      - Collected in What If...?: The Complete Collection Volume 3 (tpb, 488 pages, 2019, ISBN 1-3029-2274-2)
    - "What If Bullseye Had Not Killed Elektra?" (in #35, 1982)
      - Collected in Daredevil Visionaries: Frank Miller Volume 3 (tpb, 192 pages, 2001, ISBN 0-7851-0802-5)
      - Collected in Elektra by Frank Miller and Bill Sienkiewicz Omnibus (hc, 400 pages, 2008, ISBN 0-7851-2777-1)
      - Collected in Daredevil by Frank Miller and Klaus Janson Volume 3 (tpb, 336 pages, 2009, ISBN 0-7851-3475-1)
      - Collected in What If...?: The Complete Collection Volume 3 (tpb, 488 pages, 2019, ISBN 1-3029-2274-2)
  - Bizarre Adventures #28 (as writer/artist, untitled ten-page story featuring Elektra, anthology, Marvel Magazine Group, 1981)
    - Collected in Daredevil Visionaries: Frank Miller Volume 3 (tpb, 192 pages, 2001, ISBN 0-7851-0802-5)
    - Collected in Elektra by Frank Miller and Bill Sienkiewicz Omnibus (hc, 400 pages, 2008, ISBN 0-7851-2777-1)
  - Fantastic Four Roast (as artist, one-page sequence featuring Daredevil in a humorous one-shot written by Fred Hembeck, 1982)
    - The one-page sequence was reprinted in Daredevil by Frank Miller and Klaus Janson Omnibus (hc, 840 pages, 2007, ISBN 0-7851-2343-1)
    - The entire one-shot was collected in The Marvel Universe According to Hembeck (tpb, 304 pages, 2016, ISBN 1-30290-249-0)
  - Daredevil #219: "Badlands" (as writer, drawn by John Buscema, 1985)
    - Collected in Daredevil by Frank Miller Omnibus Companion (hc, 608 pages, 2008, ISBN 0-7851-2676-7)
    - Collected in Daredevil by Frank Miller and Klaus Janson Volume 3 (tpb, 336 pages, 2009, ISBN 0-7851-3475-1)
  - Daredevil/Elektra: Love and War (hc, 328 pages, 2003, ISBN 0-7851-1032-1) collects:
    - Daredevil: Love and War (as writer, drawn by Bill Sienkiewicz, graphic novel, 64 pages, 1986, ISBN 0-87135-172-2)
      - Also collected in Daredevil by Frank Miller Omnibus Companion (hc, 608 pages, 2008, ISBN 0-7851-2676-7)
      - Also collected in Daredevil by Frank Miller and Klaus Janson Volume 3 (tpb, 336 pages, 2009, ISBN 0-7851-3475-1)
    - Elektra: Assassin #1–8 (as writer, drawn by Bill Sienkiewicz, Epic, 1986–1987)
      - Also collected as Elektra: Assassin (tpb, 264 pages, 1987, ISBN 0-871-35309-1; hc, 272 pages, 2012, ISBN 0-7851-6354-9)
      - Also collected in Elektra by Frank Miller and Bill Sienkiewicz Omnibus (hc, 400 pages, 2008, ISBN 0-7851-2777-1)
  - Daredevil #226–233 (as writer, drawn by David Mazzucchelli; issue #226 is co-written by Miller and Dennis O'Neil, 1986)
    - Collected as Daredevil: Born Again (hc, 248 pages, 2009, ISBN 0-785-13480-8; tpb, 2010, ISBN 0-7851-3481-6)
    - Collected in Daredevil by Frank Miller Omnibus Companion (hc, 608 pages, 2008, ISBN 0-7851-2676-7)
  - Elektra Lives Again (as writer/artist, graphic novel, 80 pages, 1990, ISBN 0-8713-5738-0)
    - A re-lettered version of the story was published as Elektra Lives Again (hc, 80 pages, 2002, ISBN 0-7851-0890-4)
    - The re-lettered version was collected in Elektra by Frank Miller and Bill Sienkiewicz Omnibus (hc, 400 pages, 2008, ISBN 0-7851-2777-1)
  - Daredevil: The Man Without Fear #1–5 (as writer, drawn by John Romita, Jr., 1993–1994)
    - Collected as Daredevil: The Man Without Fear (tpb, 160 pages, 1994, ISBN 0-7851-0046-6; hc, 224 pages, 2008, ISBN 0-7851-3478-6)
    - Collected in Daredevil by Frank Miller Omnibus Companion (hc, 608 pages, 2008, ISBN 0-7851-2676-7)
- Doctor Strange vol. 2 (written by Roger Stern; Miller was announced as the new regular artist in 1981 but departed the series due to heavy workload)
- What If...? #32 (as inker — among other artists (only on the character Moondragon); written by Mark Gruenwald, drawn by Greg LaRocque, anthology, 1982)
- Bizarre Adventures #31: "The Philistine" (as artist, written by Dennis O'Neil, anthology, Marvel Magazine Group, 1982)
- Heroes for Hope: Starring the X-Men (as artist, written by Harlan Ellison, three-page (22–24) sequence featuring Wolverine in the special jam benefit comic, one-shot, 1985)
- The Sensational She-Hulk #50: "He's Dead?!" (as artist, two-page sequence parodying Miller's Sin City in a story co-written by John Byrne and Michael Eury, 1993)
  - Collected in The Sensational She-Hulk by John Byrne: The Return (tpb, 458 pages, 2016, ISBN 1-3029-0169-9)
  - Collected in The Sensational She-Hulk By John Byrne Omnibus (hc, 752 pages, 2020, ISBN 1-3029-2368-4)
- Deadpool/Batman: "Showdown" (as writer/artist, anthology one-shot, 2025) collected in DC/Marvel: The Cosmic Kiss Caper and Other Stories (hc, 224 pages, 2026, ISBN 1-7995-1353-X; tpb, 2026, ISBN 1-79951-354-8)
- The Amazing Spider-Man #1000: "Tears of the Spider-Queen" (as writer, drawn by Peach Momoko, co-feature, 2026)

=== Dark Horse Comics ===
- Martha Washington (as writer, drawn by Dave Gibbons):
  - The Life and Times of Martha Washington in the Twenty-First Century (hc, 600 pages, 2009, ISBN 1-59307-654-1; tpb, 2010, ISBN 1-59582-482-0) collects:
    - Give Me Liberty #1–4 (1990–1991) also collected as Give Me Liberty (tpb, 216 pages, 1992, ISBN 0-440-50446-5; hc, 1995, ISBN 1-56971-045-7)
    - Dark Horse Presents (anthology):
      - "Martha Washington’s War Diary" (in 5th Anniversary Special, 1991)
      - "Attack of the Flesh-Eating Monsters" (in #100-4, 1995)
    - San Diego Comic-Con Comics #2: "State of the Art" (anthology, 1992)
    - Martha Washington Goes to War #1–5 (Legend, 1994) also collected as Martha Washington Goes to War (tpb, 144 pages, 1996, ISBN 1-56971-090-2)
    - Happy Birthday, Martha Washington: "Collateral Damage" (one-shot, Legend, 1995)
      - The short story is a crossover between Martha Washington and Nixon, the main character from Miller and Geof Darrow's series Hard Boiled.
      - Two other stories in this one-shot are colorized reprints of "State of the Art" and "Martha Washington’s War Diary" (under the title "Insubordination").
    - Martha Washington Stranded in Space: "Crossover" (one-shot, 1995)
      - The story is a crossover between Martha Washington and Big Guy from Miller and Geof Darrow's series The Big Guy and Rusty the Boy Robot.
      - The co-feature in this one-shot is a colorized reprint of "Attack of the Flesh-Eating Monsters".
    - Martha Washington Saves the World #1–3 (1997–1998) also collected as Martha Washington Saves the World (tpb, 112 pages, 1999, ISBN 1-56971-384-7)
    - Dark Horse Action Figure Comics #2: "Logistics" (free giveaway comic packaged with Martha Washington action figures, 1998)
    - Martha Washington Dies (one-shot, 2007)
- Hard Boiled #1–3 (as writer, drawn by Geof Darrow, 1990–1992) collected as Hard Boiled (tpb, 128 pages, 1993, ISBN 1-878574-58-2, hc, 144 pages, 1993, ISBN 1-56971-049-X)
  - An unlettered and uncolored version of the story was released in an oversized edition under the title Big Damn Hard Boiled (tpb, 128 pages, 1998, ISBN 1-56971-323-5)
  - A recolored version of the story was released as part of a series of Darrow reprints under the title Hard Boiled (hc, 136 pages, 2017, ISBN 1-5067-0107-8)
- Sin City (as writer/artist):
  - Dark Horse Presents 5th Anniversary Special and Dark Horse Presents #51–62: "Sin City" (anthology, 1991–1992) collected as Sin City (tpb, 208 pages, 1993, ISBN 1-878574-59-0)
    - The story is referred to with the subtitle "The Hard Goodbye" in all subsequent printings.
  - San Diego Comic-Con Comics #2: "The Customer is Always Right" (anthology, 1992)
    - The story was first reprinted alongside several other tales in Sin City: The Babe Wore Red and Other Stories (one-shot, 1994)
    - The one-shot was subsequently collected in Sin City: Booze, Broads, and Bullets (tpb, 160 pages, 1998, ISBN 1-56971-366-9)
  - Sin City: A Dame to Kill for #1–6 (Legend, 1993–1994) collected as Sin City: A Dame to Kill for (tpb, 208 pages, 1994, ISBN 1-878574-59-0)
  - Previews vol. 4 #1–12: "The Babe Wore Red" (co-feature in the promotional magazine published and distributed by Diamond, 1994)
    - The serial was first published as a complete story in Sin City: The Babe Wore Red and Other Stories (one-shot, 1994)
    - The one-shot was subsequently collected in Sin City: Booze, Broads, and Bullets (tpb, 160 pages, 1998, ISBN 1-56971-366-9)
  - Sin City: The Big Fat Kill #1–5 (Legend, 1994–1995) collected as Sin City: The Big Fat Kill (tpb, 184 pages, 1996, ISBN 1-56971-171-2)
  - Sin City: Booze, Broads, and Bullets (tpb, 160 pages, 1998, ISBN 1-56971-366-9) collects:
    - Sin City: The Babe Wore Red and Other Stories (one-shot, Legend, 1994)
      - The one-shot includes two reprints of stories first published elsewhere (see above)
      - The only new material is a four-page story titled "And Behind Door Number Three..."
    - San Diego Comic-Con Comics #4: "Fat Man and Little Boy" (anthology, 1995)
    - Sin City: Silent Night (one-shot, Legend, 1995)
    - A Decade of Dark Horse #1: "Daddy's Little Girl" (anthology, 1996)
      - Also reprinted in Tales to Offend (one-shot, 1997)
      - Also collected in Decade: A Dark Horse Short Story Collection (tpb, 112 pages, 1997, ISBN 1-56971-179-8)
    - Sin City: Lost, Lonely, and Lethal (one-shot featuring two new stories and a reprint of "Fat Man and Little Boy", Legend, 1996)
    - Sin City: Sex and Violence (one-shot, Legend, 1997)
    - Sin City #½: "Just Another Saturday Night" (1997)
      - This edition was initially available only via special offer published in Wizard #73 (Wizard Entertainment, 1997)
      - The story was later reprinted as a separate one-shot under the title Sin City: Just Another Saturday Night (1998)
  - Sin City: That Yellow Bastard #1–5 (Legend, 1996) collected as Sin City: That Yellow Bastard (tpb, 240 pages, 1997, ISBN 1-56971-225-5)
  - Sin City: Family Values (graphic novel, 128 pages, 1997, ISBN 1-56971-313-8)
  - Hell and Back: A Sin City Love Story #1–9 (1999–2000) collected as Hell and Back: A Sin City Love Story (tpb, 312 pages, 2001, ISBN 1-56971-481-9)
- RoboCop vs. the Terminator #1–4 (as writer, drawn by Walt Simonson, 1992) collected as RoboCop vs. the Terminator (hc, 144 pages, 2014, ISBN 1-61655-008-2)
- Madman Comics #6–7 (as dialogue writer — only for the character Big Guy appearing as part of a crossover; written and drawn by Mike Allred, Legend, 1995)
- The Big Guy and Rusty the Boy Robot #1–2 (as writer, drawn by Geof Darrow, Legend, 1995) collected as The Big Guy and Rusty the Boy Robot (tpb, 80 pages, 1996, ISBN 1-56971-201-8)
  - An unlettered and uncolored version of the story was released in an oversized edition titled King-Size Big Guy and Rusty the Boy Robot (tpb, 72 pages, 1997, ISBN 1-56971-191-7)
  - A recolored version of the story was released as part of a series of Darrow reprints under the title The Big Guy and Rusty the Boy Robot (hc, 104 pages, 2015, ISBN 1-61655-853-9)
- Dark Horse Presents #100-1 and 114: "Lance Blastoff" (as writer/artist, anthology, 1995–1996)
  - The colorized versions of these two stories were published in Tales to Offend (one-shot, 1997)
- 300 #1–5 (as writer/artist, 1998) collected as 300 (hc, 88 pages, 1999, ISBN 1-56971-402-9)
- Dark Horse Maverick 2000: "Mercy!" (as writer/artist, anthology one-shot, 2000)
- 9-11 Volume 1 (as writer/artist, untitled two-page story in the anthology graphic novel, 196 pages, 2002, ISBN 1-56389-881-0)
- Dark Horse Maverick: Happy Endings: "The End" (as writer/artist, anthology graphic novel, 96 pages, 2002, ISBN 1-56971-820-2)
- AutobioGraphix: "Man with Pen in Head" (as writer/artist, anthology graphic novel, 104 pages, 2003, ISBN 1-59307-038-1)
  - The story was first published as a limited edition 8-page mini comic titled Man with Pen in Head (2003)
  - The mini comic was distributed as a reward for donations to the Comic Book Legal Defense Fund.
- Eisner/Miller (book-length interview with Will Eisner conducted by Miller, 350 pages, 2005, ISBN 1-5697-1755-9)
- Usagi Yojimbo vol. 3 #100 (as writer/artist, untitled one-page story featuring a crossover between Miyamoto Usagi and Marv, 2007)
  - Collected in Usagi Yojimbo: Bridge of Tears (hc, 248 pages, 2009, ISBN 1-59582-297-6; tpb, 2009, ISBN 1-59582-298-4)
  - Collected in The Usagi Yojimbo Saga Book Six (tpb, 600 pages, 2016, ISBN 1-61655-614-5)
- Xerxes #1–5 (as writer/artist, 2018) collected as Xerxes (hc, 112 pages, 2019, ISBN 1-5067-0882-X)

=== Frank Miller Presents ===
- Sin City:
  - Sin City: Blood and Dust (as writer/artist, unreleased series — announced in 2022)
  - Sin City in Color (as writer, unreleased one-shot to be drawn by Milo Manara — announced in 2022)
- Ronin: Book II #1–6 (as writer/artist; issues #1–3 and 5 are drawn by Philip Tan from Miller's layouts; issues #4 and 6 are drawn by Miller, 2022–2024)
  - An untitled 10-page preview story, written by Miller and drawn by Philip Tan, was published in Frank Miller Presents: Ashcan Edition (one-shot, 2022)
  - The six-issue series was collected by Abrams ComicArts in two different formats:
    - Frank Miller's Ronin Rising: Collector's Edition (hc, 192 pages, 2024, ISBN 1-4197-7661-4)
    - Frank Miller's Ronin Rising: Manga Edition (tpb, 288 pages, Kana, 2024, ISBN 1-4197-7662-2)
- Ancient Enemies #1–6 (written by Dan DiDio, drawn by Danilo Beyruth, 2022–2023)
  - A 17-page prelude, titled "The Challenge", was published in Frank Miller Presents: Ashcan Edition (one-shot, 2022)
  - Issue #2 includes an untitled short story, written and drawn by Miller, featuring the origin of the character The Geek.
  - Several spin-off one-shots were also published during the series' run:
    - Ancient Enemies: The Djinni (co-written by Dan DiDio and Kevin VanHook, drawn by José Luis, 2023)
    - Ancient Enemies: The Wraith and Son (written by Dan DiDio, drawn by Jim Califiore, 2023)
    - Ancient Enemies: The Greater Good (written by Dan DiDio, drawn by Jim Califiore, 2023)
    - Ancient Enemies: The First Responder (written by Dan DiDio, drawn by Mario Guevara, 2023)
- Frank Miller's Pandora (written by Anthony Maranville and Chris Silvestri from a concept by Miller, drawn by Emma Kubert):
  - Frank Miller's Pandora #1–6 (2022–2023) collected as Frank Miller's Pandora Book One (hc, 208 pages, Abrams ComicArts, 2024, ISBN 1-4197-7723-8)
  - Frank Miller's Pandora vol. 2 #1 (solicited for a 2024 release via Abrams ComicArts due to the dissolution of Frank Miller Presents, but not published)
- Svengoolie: Lost in Time #1 (of 2 planned) (written by Rich Koz, Jim Roche and Chris Faulkner, drawn by Chris Jones, Art Baltazar and Jill Thompson, 2023)

=== Other publishers ===
- Interstate Bakeries (as artist, one-page strips created by the company's in-house advertisement agency):
  - The Human Torch in... The Icemaster Cometh (advertisement for Hostess Fruit Pies published in various Marvel titles cover-dated "January, 1980")
  - Spider-Man and the Demolition Derby (advertisement for Hostess Twinkies published in various Western Publishing titles cover-dated "January, 1980")
- The Spirit vol. 5 #30 (as artist, two-page sequence written by Dennis O'Neil for a jam issue, Kitchen Sink, 1981) collected in Spirit Jam (tpb, 48 pages, 1998, ISBN 0-87816-576-2)
- Heavy Metal vol. 6 #6: "Shakespeare for Americans" (as artist, one-page humorous retelling of Julius Caesar written by Walt Simonson, anthology, HM Communications, 1982)
- AARGH!: "The Future of Law Enforcement: RoboHomoPhobe!" (as writer/artist, anthology one-shot, Mad Love, 1988)
- Pilote et Charlie #27: "The Chase" (as writer/artist, anthology, Dargaud, 1988)
- Spawn (as writer, drawn by Todd McFarlane, Image):
  - Spawn #11: "Home Story" (1993)
    - Collected in Spawn: Origins Collection Volume 2 (tpb, 184 pages, 2009, ISBN 1-60706-489-8)
    - Collected in Spawn: Origins Collection Book One (hc, 300 pages, 2010, ISBN 1-60706-153-8)
  - Spawn/Batman (one-shot, 1994)
    - Collected in Batman/Spawn: The Classic Collection (hc, 112 pages, 2022, ISBN 1-7795-2281-9)
    - Collected in Batman/Spawn: The Deluxe Collection (hc, 280 pages, 2023, ISBN 1-7795-2281-9)
- Satan's Six #1 (as inker on a single page for an untitled ten-page co-feature written and drawn by Jack Kirby, Topps, 1993)
- British GQ (Jun '95–May '96): "Bad Boy" (as writer, drawn by Simon Bisley, serialized strip in the magazine, Condé Nast, 1995–1996)
  - The serial was first published as a complete story by Oni Press as Bad Boy (one-shot, 1997)
  - A 10th Anniversary Edition of the story was published by Dynamite as Bad Boy (hc, 48 pages, 2008, ISBN 1-933305-54-1)
- RoboCop (adaptations of Miller's original screenplays for RoboCop 2 and RoboCop 3, written primarily by Steven Grant):
  - The Complete Frank Miller RoboCop Omnibus (tpb, 120 pages, Boom! Studios, 2016, ISBN 1-937278-00-X) collects:
    - Frank Miller's RoboCop #1–9 (drawn by Juan José Ryp, Avatar, 2003–2006)
      - Also collected by Avatar as Frank Miller's RoboCop (hc, 216 pages, 2006, ISBN 1-5929-1036-X; tpb, 2007, ISBN 1-5929-1035-1)
      - Also collected by Boom! Studios as RoboCop Volume 1 (tpb, 208 pages, 2013, ISBN 1-60886-375-1)
    - RoboCop: Last Stand (drawn by Korkut Öztekin; issue #8 is written by Ed Brisson, Boom! Studios, 2013–2014) also collected as:
      - RoboCop Volume 2: Last Stand Part One (collects #1–4, tpb, 112 pages, 2014, ISBN 1-6088-6374-3)
      - RoboCop Volume 3: Last Stand Part Two (collects #5–8, tpb, 128 pages, 2014, ISBN 1-6088-6429-4)
- Holy Terror (as writer/artist, graphic novel, 120 pages, Legendary, 2011, ISBN 1-937278-00-X)
- Cursed (prose novel co-written by Miller and Tom Wheeler with illustrations by Miller, 416 pages, Simon & Schuster, 2019, ISBN 1-5344-2533-0)
- Push the Wall: My Life, Writing, Drawing, and the Art of Storytelling (prose autobiography, 224 pages, Saga Press, 2026, ISBN 1-6680-6529-0)

=== Cover illustrations ===
- John Carter, Warlord of Mars #26 (Marvel, 1978)
- Marvel Premiere #49, 53–54, 58 (Marvel, 1979–1981)
- X-Men Annual #3 (Marvel, 1979)
- Marvel Spotlight vol. 2 #2, 5, 7 (Marvel, 1979–1980)
- Marvel Comics Super Special #14 (Marvel, 1979)
- ROM Spaceknight #1, 3, 17–18 (Marvel, 1979–1981)
- Captain America #241, 244–245, 255, Annual #5 (Marvel, 1980–1981)
- The Avengers #193 (Marvel, 1980)
- The Amazing Spider-Man #203, 218–219 (Marvel, 1980–1981)
- Marvel Team-Up #95, 99, 102–103, 106, Annual #3 (Marvel, 1980–1981)
- Battlestar Galactica #17 (Marvel, 1980)
- Star Trek vol. 2 #5, 10 (Marvel, 1980–1981)
- The Comics Journal #58, 70, 101, 209 (Fantagraphics, 1980–1998)
- The Spectacular Spider-Man #46, 48, 50–52, 54–57, 60 (Marvel, 1980–1981)
- Spider-Woman #30–32 (Marvel, 1980)
- Comics Feature #7, 14 (New Media Publishing, 1980–1981)
- Power Man and Iron Fist #66–68, 70–74 (Marvel, 1980–1981)
- LoC #1 (New Media Publishing, 1981)
- Machine Man #19 (Marvel, 1981)
- Doctor Strange vol. 2 #46 (Marvel, 1981)
- The Incredible Hulk #258, 261, 264, 268 (Marvel, 1981–1982)
- Star Wars #47 (Marvel, 1981)
- Micronauts #31 (Marvel, 1981)
- What If...? #27 (Marvel, 1981)
- Moon Knight #9, 12, 15, 27 (Marvel, 1981–1983)
- Ghost Rider #59 (as inker — on Bob Budiansky, Marvel, 1981)
- Amazing Heroes #4, 25, 69 (Fantagraphics, 1981–1985)
- The Marvel Comics Index #9b (Pacific, 1982)
- FantaCo's Chronicles Series #3 (FantaCo, 1982)
- World's Finest Comics #285 (DC Comics, 1982)
- Wonder Woman #298 (DC Comics, 1982)
- Comics Interview #2, 31, 82, 113 (Fictioneer Books, 1983)
- The New Adventures of Superboy #51 (DC Comics, 1984)
- Spider-Man and Daredevil Special Edition (Marvel, 1984)
- Destroyer Duck #7 (Eclipse, 1984)
- Batman and the Outsiders Annual #1 (DC Comics, 1984)
- Superman: The Secret Years #1–4 (DC Comics, 1985)
- Anything Goes! #2 (Fantagraphics, 1986)
- 'Mazing Man #12 (DC Comics, 1986)
- Lone Wolf and Cub #1–12 (First Comics, 1987–1988)
- Death Rattle #18 (Kitchen Sink, 1988)
- Eternal Warrior #1 (Valiant, 1992)
- Archer and Armstrong #1 (Valiant, 1992)
- Magnus, Robot Fighter vol. 2 #15 (Valiant, 1992)
- X-O Manowar #7 (Valiant, 1992)
- Shadowman #4 (Valiant, 1992)
- Rai #6 (Valiant, 1992)
- Harbinger #8 (Valiant, 1992)
- Solar, Man of the Atom #12 (Valiant, 1992)
- Comics' Greatest World: Arcadia #1 (Dark Horse, 1993)
- Comics' Greatest World: Vortex #4 (Dark Horse, 1993)
- John Byrne's Next Men #17 (Dark Horse, 1993)
- Zorro vol. 3 #1 (Topps, 1994)
- Wizard #31 (jam cover), 32, 40, 73 (Wizard Entertainment, 1994–1997)
- X: One Shot to the Head #1 (Dark Horse, 1994)
- Hero Illustrated #18 (Warrior Publications, 1994)
- Medal of Honor #4 (Dark Horse, 1995)
- Mickey Spillane's Mike Danger #1 (Tekno Comix, 1995)
- Prophet vol. 2 #2 (Extreme Studios, 1995)
- X #18–22 (Dark Horse, 1995–1996)
- G.I. Joe #1 (Dark Horse, 1995)
- Batman: Black and White #2 (DC Comics, 1996)
- DC Archive Editions: Legion of Super-Heroes Volume 7 (DC Comics, 1997)
- Heavy Metal vol. 23 #5 (HM Communications, 1999)
- Whiteout collected edition (Oni Press, 1999)
- Bone #38 (Cartoon Books, 2000)
- Spawn #100 (Image, 2000)
- Green Lantern/Superman: Legend of the Green Flame (DC Comics, 2000)
- DC Archive Editions: Supergirl Volume 1 (DC Comics, 2001)
- Dark Horse Maverick 2001 (Dark Horse, 2001)
- Gravity's Rainbow (Penguin Classics, 2006)
- The Escapists #1 (Dark Horse, 2006)
- Jurassic Park vol. 2 #1 (IDW Publishing, 2010)
- Dark Horse Presents vol. 2 #1 (Dark Horse, 2011)
- Detective Comics vol. 2 #27 (DC Comics, 2014)
- CBLDF Defender #4 (Comic Book Legal Defense Fund, 2015)
- The Flash vol. 4 #49 (as inker — on Neal Adams, DC Comics, 2016)
- Moonshine #1 (Image, 2016)
- Shaolin Cowboy: Who'll Stop the Reign? #1 (Dark Horse, 2017)
- Sacred Creatures #1 (Image, 2017)
- The Kamandi Challenge #12 (DC Comics, 2018)
- Batman vol. 3 #62 (DC Comics, 2019)
- Detective Comics #1000 (DC Comics, 2019)
- Robin 80th Anniversary 100-Page Super Spectacular (DC Comics, 2020)
- Fire Power #12 (Image, 2021)
- Spider-Man vol. 4 #1 (Marvel, 2022)
- Fantastic Four vol. 7 #1, 12 (Marvel, 2023)
- Loki vol. 4 #1 (Marvel, 2023)
- Blade vol. 4 #1 (Marvel, 2023)
- Moon Knight vol. 7 #25 (Marvel, 2023)
- Marvel Age #1000 (Marvel, 2023)
- The Incredible Hulk vol. 4 #3 (Marvel, 2023)
- Ghost Rider/Wolverine: Weapons of Vengeance Alpha (Marvel, 2023)
- Batman: Gargoyle of Gotham #1 (DC Comics, 2023)
- Silver Surfer: Rebirth — Legacy #1 (Marvel, 2023)
- Daredevil vol. 8 #1, 8 (Marvel, 2023–2024)
- Captain America vol. 9 #1 (Marvel, 2023)
- Deadpool: Seven Slaughters (Marvel, 2024)
- Ascencia #22 (Wake Entertainment, 2024)
- Avengers: Twilight #1 (Marvel, 2024)
- Vengeance of the Moon Knight vol. 2 #1 (Marvel, 2024)
- Star Wars: Darth Maul — Black White and Red #1 (Marvel, 2024)
- Wolverine vol. 7 #50 (Marvel, 2024)
- Thanos vol. 4 Annual #1 (Marvel, 2024)
- Uncle Scrooge and the Infinity Dime #1 (Marvel, 2024)
- Falling in Love on the Path to Hell #5 (Image, 2024)
- Deathlok 50th Anniversary Special (Marvel, 2024)
- Lucky Devils #1 (Image, 2025)
- Ultimate Universe: One Year In (Marvel, 2025)
- Sabretooth: The Dead Don't Talk #1 (Marvel, 2025)
- What If... Galactus Transformed Hulk? (Marvel, 2025)
- Deadpool/Wolverine #1 (Marvel, 2025)
- Red Hulk #1 (Marvel, 2025)
- The Amazing Spider-Man vol. 6 #70 (Marvel, 2025)
- Daredevil: Cold Day in Hell #1–2 (Marvel, 2025)
- The Curse of Sherlee Johnson #3 (Image, 2025)
- Captain America vol. 10 #1 (Marvel, 2025)
- Detective Comics #1100 (DC Comics, 2025)
- The Punisher: Red Band #1 (Marvel, 2025)
- Batman vol. 4 #1, 13 (DC Comics, 2025–2026)
- Nova: Centurion #1 (Marvel, 2026)
- Spider-Man/Superman (Marvel, 2026)
- Teenage Mutant Ninja Turtles vol. 7 #20 (IDW Publishing, 2026)
- Terminal #1 (Skybound, 2026)
- Barbara Gordon: Breakout #4 (DC Comics, 2026)
- Something is Killing the Children #50 (Boom! Studios, 2026)

=== Other work ===
- Star Wars #43: "The Duel Begins!" (one-page illustration, Marvel, 1981)
- Pretty Girl Sketchbook (one-page illustration, Paisley Publications, 1981)
- Marvel Super-Heroes #95 (one-page illustration featuring Hulk, Marvel, 1981)
- Visions #4 (inside back cover illustration featuring Batman, Atlanta Fantasy Fair, 1982)
- Marvel Fanfare #1 (back cover illustration featuring Daredevil, Marvel, 1982)
- Ms. Tree: "Famous Detective Pin-Up" (series of two-page illustrations featuring fictional sleuths, Eclipse):
  - "Mike Hammer" (in Ms. Tree's Thrilling Detective Adventures #1, 1983)
  - "Philip Marlowe" (in Ms. Tree's Thrilling Detective Adventures #2, 1983)
  - "The Continental Op" (in Ms. Tree's Thrilling Detective Adventures #3, 1983)
  - "Nancy Drew" (in Ms. Tree #4, 1983)
- The Official Handbook of the Marvel Universe (illustrations for various character profiles, Marvel):
  - "Black Widow" and "Bullseye" (in #2, 1983)
  - "Daredevil" and "Dormammu" (in #3, 1983)
  - "Elektra" and "Eternity" (in #4, 1983)
  - "Havok" (in #5, 1983)
  - "Kingpin" (in #6, 1983)
  - "Punisher" (in #8, 1983)
  - "Space Phantom" (in #10, 1983)
- Classic X-Men #22 (one-page illustration featuring Wolverine, Marvel, 1988)
- Strip AIDS U.S.A.: "RoboHomoPhobe!" (one-page illustration, anthology graphic novel, Last Gasp, 1988)
- Images of Omaha #2: "Omaha Under Silk" (one-page illustration, Kitchen Sink, 1992)
- Superman Special (one-page illustration, DC Comics, 1992)
- Spawn #8 (insert poster, Image, 1993)
- Marvel Age #127 (back cover illustration featuring Daredevil, Marvel, 1993)
- Madman Comics #1: "Madman Picture Exhibition" (back cover illustration, Dark Horse, 1994)
- Hellboy: Seed of Destruction (one-page illustration created for the collected edition, Legend, 1994)
- Jack Kirby's Heroes and Villains (as inker on a Spider-Man sketch by Jack Kirby, Pure Imagination, 1994)
- Overstreet's Fan #2–18, 20–24 (untitled opinion column in the magazine, Gemstone Publishing, 1995–1997)
- Star Slammers Special (one-page illustration, Legend, 1996)
- Monkeyman and O'Brien #2 (one-page illustration, Legend, 1996)
- Dark Horse Presents #115 (back cover illustration, Dark Horse, 1996)
- Batman: Legends of the Dark Knight #100 (one-page illustration featuring Carrie Kelley, DC Comics, 1997)
- 100 Bullets #26 (one-page illustration featuring Agent Graves, Vertigo, 2001)
- Heroes (one-page illustration featuring Captain America, Marvel, 2001)
- Savage Dragon #100 (one-page illustration, Highbrow Entertainment, 2002)
- Nest #19: "Final Nest" (two-page proposal for the Twin Towers memorial site, Nest Publishing, 2002)
- Mad #438: "The League of Rejected Superheroes: Inebrion" (one-page illustration, EC Comics, 2004)
- Dark Horse Twenty Years (one-page illustration featuring Miyamoto Usagi, Dark Horse, 2006)
- Kane: Partners (one-page illustration created for the collected edition, Image, 2006)
- The Art of Matt Wagner's Grendel (one-page illustration, Dark Horse, 2007)
- Liberty Annual '10 (two-page illustration featuring Nancy Callahan, Image, 2010)
- Batman vol. 3 #50 (one-page illustration featuring Batman and Catwoman, DC Comics, 2018)

== Filmography ==
=== Films ===
Year	Title	Director	Screenwriter	Executive Producer	Actor	Role	Notes
1990	RoboCop 2	No	Yes	No	Uncredited	Frank, the Chemist	
1993	RoboCop 3	No	Yes	No	No	—N/a	
1994	Jugular Wine: A Vampire Odyssey	No	No	No	Yes	Frank Miller	
2003	Daredevil	No	No	No	Yes	Man with Pen in Head	Also inspired by his graphic novels
2005	Sin City	Yes	Uncredited	No	Yes	The Priest	Also based on his graphic novel Co-directed with Robert Rodriguez
2006	300	No	No	Yes	No	—N/a	Also based on his graphic novels
2008	The Spirit	Yes	Yes	No	Yes	Liebowitz	
2014	300: Rise of an Empire	No	No	Yes	No	—N/a	Also based on his graphic novels
2014	Sin City: A Dame to Kill For	Yes	Yes	Yes	Uncredited	Sam	Also based on his graphic novels Co-directed with Robert Rodriguez

=== Television ===
Year	Title	Creator	Executive Producer	Actor	Role	Notes
2020	Cursed	Yes	Yes	Yes	Brother Horde	Based on his novel

== Bibliography ==
- Young, Paul (2016). Frank Miller's Daredevil and the Ends of Heroism. Rutgers University Press. ISBN 978-0-8135-6381-7.

Preceded by Gene Colan	Daredevil artist 1979–1983	Succeeded by Klaus Janson
Preceded by Roger McKenzie	Daredevil writer 1981–1983	Succeeded by Dennis O'Neil
Preceded by Dennis O'Neil	Daredevil writer 1986	Succeeded by Ann Nocenti
Preceded by Max Allan Collins	Batman writer 1987	Succeeded by Max Allan Collins
