= Holy Terror (graphic novel) =

2011 graphic novel by Frank Miller

Publication information
- Publisher: Legendary Comics
- Genre: Action, superhero
- Publication date: September 28, 2011
- Main character: The Fixer

Creative team
- Written by: Frank Miller
- Artist: Frank Miller

Holy Terror is a 2011 graphic novel by Frank Miller which follows a costumed vigilante named The Fixer as he battles Islamic terrorists after an attack on Empire City. The graphic novel was originally proposed as a Batman story for DC Comics, titled Holy Terror, Batman!, but was reworked along the way to feature a character of Miller's creation instead, and published by another company.

== Development ==
As originally announced the plot revolved around Batman defending Gotham City from an attack by the Islamist terrorist group Al-Qaeda. According to Miller, the comic would have been a "piece of propaganda" in which Batman "kicks Al-Qaeda's ass".

Miller announced the graphic novel during a panel at the WonderCon comic book convention held in San Francisco in 2006. He summarized the work as "not to put too fine a point on it, a piece of propaganda... Superman punched out Hitler. So did Captain America. That's one of the things they're there for."

The title of the graphic novel is a reference to the war on terror as well as the catchphrase ("Holy [something], Batman!") used by Robin (Burt Ward) in the 1960s Batman television series.

Later that year, on the anniversary of the September 11 attacks, NPR aired a brief memorial commentary by Miller, which provided insight into his inspiration for this project:

For the first time in my life I know how it feels to face an existential menace. They want us to die. All of a sudden I realize what my parents were talking about all those years. Patriotism, I now believe, isn't some sentimental, old conceit. It's self-preservation. I believe patriotism is central to a nation's survival. Ben Franklin said it: If we don't all hang together, we all hang separately.

In a May 2007 interview, Miller relayed that he was still at work on the graphic novel, which he said was "bound to offend just about everybody". Miller also said he was about 100 pages into it with 50 remaining. The following year Miller said the series, until then being billed as Holy War, Batman, would no longer feature Batman. "As I worked on it, it became something that was no longer Batman," he clarified. "It's somewhere past that and I decided it's going to be part of a new series that I'm starting."

In 2010, Miller said he was no longer working on that project, clarifying that Holy Terror was in progress but without Batman. He later said it would feature a new character called The Fixer and not be published by DC. "It's no longer a DC book," he explained. "I decided partway through it that it was not a Batman story. The hero is much closer to Dirty Harry than Batman. It's a new hero that I've made up that fights Al Qaeda."

At San Diego Comic-Con in 2011, Miller further explained the reason to drop Batman and use The Fixer as the protagonist, saying "This character is much more well adjusted in committing terrible acts of violence on very evil people." Talking about the controversy the graphic novel might generate, he said he hoped the book accomplished its purpose in angering people.

== Reception ==
Holy Terror was controversial upon release; many comic book writers and reviewers argued that the novel's depiction of Muslims was Islamophobic. David Brothers of ComicsAlliance, in a review of the book, felt that Miller's writing "[simplifies] matters to an almost absurd level... the enemy in Holy Terror is not so much the terrorist organization, Al-Qaeda, but the religion of Islam." Similarly, Cyriaque Lamar of Io9 called the portrayal of terrorists "cartoonish... [gutting] Holy Terror of any emotional resonance." Spencer Ackerman of Wired wrote that the book was "one of the most appalling, offensive and vindictive comics of all time... Miller's Holy Terror is a screed against Islam, completely uninterested in any nuance or empathy toward 1.2 billion people he conflates with a few murderous conspiracy theorists."

In August 2006, fellow Batman writer Grant Morrison criticized the novel's concept, saying:

Batman vs. Al Qaeda! It might as well be Bin Laden vs. King Kong! Or how about the sinister Al Qaeda mastermind up against a hungry Hannibal Lecter! For all the good it's likely to do. Cheering on a fictional character as he beats up fictionalized terrorists seems like a decadent indulgence when real terrorists are killing real people in the real world. I'd be so much more impressed if Frank Miller gave up all this graphic novel nonsense, joined the Army and, with a howl of undying hate, rushed headlong onto the front lines with the young soldiers who are actually risking life and limb 'vs.' Al Qaeda.

Miller responded generally to these criticisms on his blog, again referring to the book as intentional propaganda "without apology" and saying, "I'm too old to serve my country in any other way. Otherwise, I'd gladly be pulling the trigger myself." However, in 2018, Miller expressed regret for writing Holy Terror: "My stuff always represents what I’m going through. Whenever I look at any of my work I can feel what my mindset was and I remember who I was with at the time. When I look at Holy Terror, which I really don’t do all that often, I can really feel the anger ripple out of the pages. There are places where it is bloodthirsty beyond belief. [...] I don’t want to wipe out chapters of my own biography. But I'm not capable of that book again."

== See also ==
- Batman: Holy Terror, an Elseworlds one-shot published by DC Comics in 1991
