= The Dark Knight Strikes Again =

2001–02 comic book series by Frank Miller

- Cover of the trade paperback Batman: The Dark Knight Strikes Again. Cover design by Chip Kidd.

Publication information
- Publisher: DC Comics
- Schedule: Monthly
- Format: Limited series
- Publication date: December 2001 – February 2002
- No. of issues: 3
- Main characters: Batman; Superman; Catgirl; Lex Luthor; Brainiac; Dick Grayson

Creative team
- Created by: Frank Miller; Lynn Varley; Todd Klein; Bob Kane; Bill Finger
- Written by: Frank Miller
- Artist: Frank Miller
- Colorist: Lynn Varley

The Dark Knight Strikes Again, also known as Batman: The Dark Knight Strikes Again and DK2, is a 2001–2002 DC Comics three-issue limited series American comic book written and illustrated by Frank Miller and colored by Lynn Varley, featuring the superhero Batman. The series is a sequel to Miller's 1986 miniseries The Dark Knight Returns. It tells the story of an aged Bruce Wayne who returns from three years in hiding, training his followers and instigating a rebellion against Lex Luthor and Brainiac's dictatorial rule over the United States. The series features an ensemble cast of superheroes including Catgirl, Superman, Wonder Woman, Plastic Man, Green Arrow, The Flash, and the Atom.

Reception to The Dark Knight Strikes Again was lukewarm, being criticized for its art style, narrative, and themes, and it is widely considered to be an inferior follow-up to The Dark Knight Returns, as well as a less culturally impactful piece in comic book media.

== Overview ==
The series was originally published as a three-issue limited series published by DC Comics between November 2001 and July 2002. It has since been published as hardcover and paperback one-volume editions and as the Absolute Dark Knight edition with The Dark Knight Returns. Like its predecessor, this story takes place in a timeline that is not considered canonical in the current DC Comics continuity.

== Synopsis ==
Frank Miller's cover to The Dark Knight Strikes Again #1.

After going underground, Batman (Bruce Wayne) and his young sidekick Catgirl (formerly Carrie Kelley—Robin) train an army of "Batboys" (the former Mutants and other recruits) to save the world from a police dictatorship led by Lex Luthor. In a series of raids on government facilities, Batman's soldiers release other superheroes—including Atom, Flash and Plastic Man—from captivity. Elongated Man is recruited and Green Arrow is already working with Batman.

Superman, Wonder Woman, and Captain Marvel have been forced to work for the US government, as their loved ones are being held hostage. Superman is ordered by "President Rickard" (a computer-generated front for Lex Luthor and Brainiac) to stop Batman. He confronts Wayne at the Batcave, but Batman and the other superheroes defeat him. Meanwhile, Batman's raids have been noticed by the media. After being banned for years, the freed superheroes have recaptured the public imagination and have become a fad among the youth. At a pop concert by "The Superchix", Batman and the other heroes make a public appearance urging their fans to rebel against the oppressive government.

During this time, rogue vigilante Question spies on Luthor's plans and types a journal to record the misdeeds of those in power. Question tries to convince the Martian Manhunter—now an aged, bitter, near-powerless figure with his mind filled with Luthor's nanotechnology—to stand up against Superman and the government. Question and Martian Manhunter are attacked by a mysterious man resembling the Joker, who is seemingly invulnerable to injury. Martian Manhunter sacrifices his life and Question is rescued by Green Arrow. The mysterious man escapes to kill other superheroes including Guardian and Creeper, stealing their costumes and wearing them.

An extraterrestrial monster lands in Metropolis and begins to destroy the city. Batman is convinced that it is an attempt to lure him and his allies out of hiding and does not respond, dismissing Flash's appeal that they are supposed to save lives. Batman's opinion is that it is too risky to save the lives of the populace. Superman and Captain Marvel fight the monster, which is revealed to be Brainiac, who coerces Superman into defeat using the bottled Kryptonian city of Kandor as leverage, to crush the people's faith in superheroes. Captain Marvel is killed defending citizens from the carnage but Superman is saved when his daughter Lara appears. She has been carefully hidden since birth, but, now that the government knows she exists, they demand that she be handed over.

Deciding that Batman and his methods are the only way, Superman, Wonder Woman and Lara join him. Lara pretends to hand herself over to Brainiac. Atom slips into the bottle and frees the Kandorians, who use their combined heat vision to destroy Brainiac. The superheroes then destroy the dictatorship's power source and incite a revolution. Batman allows himself to be captured and tortured by Luthor to learn his plans. Luthor has launched satellites to destroy most of the world's population, leaving him with a more manageable number of people. The Green Lantern, who has turned into pure will, returns from space and destroys Luthor's satellites. Luthor is in turn killed by the son of Hawkman and Hawkgirl (Shayera Hol).

Carrie is attacked by the Joker-like man, who is now wearing a Robin costume. Batman arrives and recognizes the man as Dick Grayson, the first Robin who Batman fired long ago. Grayson has been genetically altered to have a powerful healing factor and shape-shifting ability, but is criminally insane. As Batman and Grayson contemptuously recall their bleak history together, Batman drops him through a trapdoor into a miles-deep crevasse filled with lava, while Elongated Man rescues Carrie. Grayson clings onto a ledge, climbs out of the chasm and faces Batman. When Grayson remains virtually unharmed by everything Batman throws at him, Batman hurls himself and Grayson into the chasm. Grayson falls into the lava and is disintegrated. Superman rescues Batman at the last minute as the Batcave explodes, and takes him to Carrie in the Batmobile.

== Background and creation ==
In 2006, Frank Miller said of the creation process for The Dark Knight Strikes Again:

I was out to remind readers about the inherent joy and wonder these superheroes offer, and also to celebrate their delicious absurdity. I saw the superheroes as Gods and Heroes in the Classic sense … I wanted to drag these Gods and Heroes out of that musty museum they'd been stuck in and drag them back to the streets where they belong.

— Frank Miller

== Characters ==
- Batman—Bruce Wayne's alter ego who faked his death three years ago and continues to operate secretly as Batman in 1989. He leads a rebellion against the corrupt U.S. government headed by Lex Luthor. Batman is a skilled and controversial strategist who makes decisions which result in deaths, which he considers necessary for the defeat of his enemies.
- Catgirl—Carrie Kelley, formerly Robin, is Batman's second-in-command.
- Lex Luthor—Luthor heads the U.S. government and uses a hologram of what the people think is the President as a figurehead. He controls powerful superheroes—including Superman, Captain Marvel and Wonder Woman—by holding their loved ones hostage.
- Brainiac—Provides Luthor with the means to control the U.S., and hence the world.
- Superman—Controlled by Luthor, who is holding the miniaturized city of Kandor hostage. Encouraged by his daughter and Batman, Superman finally fights back and breaks his own vow not to kill.
- Wonder Woman—The youthful Queen of the Amazons who has a daughter with Superman.
- Lara—The daughter of Superman and Wonder Woman who has the powers of a Kryptonian and the warrior attitude of an Amazon. She has a poor opinion of people less powerful than herself and tries to persuade Superman to rise above the humans and possibly take over the world.
- Captain Marvel—Now an old man, he still stands by Superman and Wonder Woman. Captain Marvel is limited in his abilities because Luthor holds his sister Mary hostage. He reveals that he and Billy Batson were two separate beings who switched places, and that Billy (who had always been sickly) had died around 8 years ago. This rendered him incapable of just switching out to recuperate because there would be no one to call him back.
- Dick Grayson / "The Joker"—Having been emotionally abused by Batman and sacked years before for "cowardice and incompetence", Grayson has submitted himself to radical gene therapy by Luthor and other villains. He has gained a powerful healing factor and shape-shifting ability, but was driven criminally insane. Throughout most of the story, Grayson takes on the appearance of the Joker and the costumes of members of the Legion of Super-Heroes. His victims include Martian Manhunter, Creeper, the Guardian, and he almost kills Carrie Kelley.
- Atom—Trapped inside a Petri dish for over two years, Ray Palmer is rescued by Carrie Kelley and becomes one of the first of the old superheroes to join Batman's rebellion.
- The Flash—Coerced by threats to his wife Iris, Barry Allen is forced to run in a giant electrical generator before being freed by Carrie Kelley and the Atom.
- Elongated Man—Ralph Dibny advertises sex drugs on television before joining Batman.
- Plastic Man—Insane and rescued from Arkham Asylum, Eel O'Brian joins Batman's group.
- The Superchix—An all-girl pop/superhero group consisting of a Black Canary lookalike, Bat Chick and Wonder Chick.
- Green Arrow—A communist, activist and billionaire with a mechanical arm, Oliver Queen has long been part of Batman's forces.
- The Question—Fighting for Batman's cause, Vic Sage works mainly alone and tries to recruit the former Martian Manhunter. He spies on Luthor and his associates, and distrusts technology and municipalization.
- Martian Manhunter—A victim of Luthor's nanobots, which have deprived him of most of his powers, J'onn J'onzz has become addicted to alcohol and tobacco. He retains a precognitive sense which he uses to help Question.
- Green Lantern—Hal Jordan now lives with his own alien family in a distant part of the galaxy. He returns to Earth at Batman's request.
- Hawkboy—Hawkman and Hawkgirl's son who grew up with his sister in the Costa Rican rainforest. When their parents are killed by a military strike ordered by Luthor, Hawkboy intends to take revenge.
- Saturn Girl—A young, thirteen-year-old who can see into the future. She adopts the name and outfit of the 31st-century Legionnaire.
- Rick Rickard—The holographic puppet President of the United States.
- U.S. Secretary of State Ruger, Exxon and Chairman of the Joint Chiefs of Staff General Starbucks—members of Luthor's government.
- Bat-Mite—Batman's old antagonist and co-founder of The First Church of The Last Son of Krypton., a lunatic fringe movement dedicated to worshipping Superman.
- Big Barda—A former pornographic actress called Hot Gates. When America descends into chaos, Big Barda declares herself dictator of Columbus, Ohio.
- Lana Harper-Lane—A television news reporter who is presumed to be the daughter of Guardian and Lois Lane.

== Publications ==
- Batman: The Dark Knight Strikes Again (2003-12-17; hardcover), 2004-07-21 (trade paperback with bonus materials): Includes parts 1-3.
- Batman Noir: The Dark Knight Strikes Again (2018-03-28; hardcover): Black and white print version of Batman: The Dark Knight Strikes Again three-part book.

== Critical reception and sales ==
The Dark Knight Strikes Again received mixed to negative reviews, with criticism focusing on its artwork, storyline, and character development. Claude Lalumière of The Montreal Gazette gave the series a mixed review and said "the script lacks the emotional nuances of its predecessor, and ... the artwork is rushed and garish", and that it "has considerable chutzpah, but its careless execution is regrettable". Roger Sabin of The Guardian wrote that the series has "flashes of brilliance—few can control page layouts like Miller—but in general the idea of the ironic superhero seems rather dated."

The first issue of "DK2" ranked #1 in December 2001 with pre-order sales at 174,339. The second issue of DK2 was ranked third in sales for the January 2002 period with pre-order sales of 155,322. The final issue of the series had pre-order sales of 171,546 returning to #1 for the month of February 2002. The comic had an in-store date on July 31 of that same year.

Discussing the negative reception for The Dark Knight Strikes Again, Frank Miller said in 2006: "I expected shock. I wanted it. I never make it my mission to reassure people. Time will make its own judgement."

== Sequel ==
On April 24, 2015, DC Comics announced that Frank Miller was co-writing a sequel to The Dark Knight Strikes Again with Brian Azzarello titled The Dark Knight III: The Master Race. The series featured a rotating cast of artists, including Andy Kubert and Klaus Janson. Frank Miller later confirmed that The Master Race would not be the conclusion, and he was beginning work on a fourth series.
