= John Costanza =

American comic book artist and letterer

- Born: August 14, 1943 (age 83) Dover, New Jersey
- Areas: Artist, letterer
- Notable works: Swamp Thing, The Dark Knight Returns
- Awards: Best Letterer of 1974 (Shazam Award)

John Costanza (born August 14, 1943, in Dover, New Jersey) is an American comic book artist and letterer. He has worked for both DC Comics and Marvel Comics. He was the letterer during Alan Moore's acclaimed run on Swamp Thing. The bulk of Costanza's art assignments have been for anthropomorphic animal comics and children-oriented material.

== Biography ==
Costanza began his career in 1965, working as Joe Kubert's assistant on the syndicated newspaper strip Tales of the Green Berets. Costanza soon started to work for comic books, both as an artist and a letterer. He started out with contributing to DC titles such as G.I. Combat and House of Mystery in the period 1968-1971. He began freelancing for Marvel (exclusively as a letterer) in 1972, at first under the alias Jon Costa. He would soon become one of the company's premier letterers, working on flagship titles such as Fantastic Four and The Amazing Spider-Man, and lettering special projects such as the Stan Lee/Jack Kirby Silver Surfer graphic novel, Silver Surfer: The Ultimate Cosmic Experience, published by Fireside Books in 1978.

During the 1970s he produced comics with Warner Bros.' Looney Tunes/Merrie Melodies characters for Western Publishing.

For Marvel's Star Comics line in the 1980s, Costanza drew such series as Heathcliff, The Get Along Gang, and The Hugga Bunch.

In the 1990s, he returned to Warner Bros. comics, this time for DC's Looney Tunes and Animaniacs titles. He also drew stories featuring Roger Rabbit and Mickey Mouse for Disney Comics. Costanza has also drawn issues of Matt Groening's The Simpsons comics.

== Bibliography (selected) ==
=== Lettering ===
- Green Lantern/Green Arrow (with writer Denny O'Neil and artists Neal Adams and Dick Giordano, DC, 1970-1972)
- The New Gods (with writer/artist Jack Kirby, DC, 1971)
- Mister Miracle (with writer/artist Jack Kirby, DC, 1971)
- The Forever People (with writer/artist Jack Kirby, DC, 1971)
- Conan the Barbarian (with writer Roy Thomas and artists Barry Smith and John Buscema, Marvel, 1972–1978)
- The Tomb of Dracula (with writer Marv Wolfman, penciller Gene Colan, and inker Tom Palmer, Marvel, 1972–1979)
- Doctor Strange (with writers Steve Englehart, Marv Wolfman, Jim Starlin, and Roger Stern and artists Frank Brunner, Gene Colan, Rudy Nebres, Al Milgrom, Tom Sutton, and Tom Palmer, Marvel, 1974–1979)
- Man-Thing (with writer Steve Gerber and editor Roy Thomas, Marvel, 1974–1975)
- Giant-Size X-Men (writer Len Wein and artist Dave Cockrum, Marvel, 1975)
- The Invaders (with writer Roy Thomas, penciller Frank Robbins, and inker Frank Springer, Marvel, 1975–1978)
- Howard the Duck (with writer Steve Gerber, pencillers Frank Brunner and Gene Colan and editor Marv Wolfman, Marvel, 1976–1978)
- Batman vs. the Incredible Hulk (writer Len Wein, penciller José Luis García-López, and inker Dick Giordano, DC/Marvel, 1981)
- Legion of Super-Heroes (with writer Paul Levitz and penciller Keith Giffen, DC, 1982–1984)
- Camelot 3000 (with writer Mike W. Barr and penciller Brian Bolland, DC, 1982–1985)
- Ronin (with writer/artist Frank Miller, six-issue limited series, DC, 1983–1984)
- Amethyst, Princess of Gemworld (with writers Dan Mishkin and Gary Cohn and penciller Ernie Colón, DC, 1983–1984)
- Crisis on Infinite Earths (with writer Marv Wolfman and penciller George Pérez, DC, 1985–1986)
- Swamp Thing (with writer Alan Moore, DC, 1985–1994)
- The Dark Knight Returns (with writer/penciler Frank Miller and inks by Klaus Janson, four-issue limited series, DC, 1986)
- Batman: Son of the Demon (with Mike W. Barr and penciller Jerry Bingham, DC, 1987)
- Wonder Woman (with writer/artist George Pérez, DC, 1987–1989)
- Batman: The Cult (with writer Jim Starlin and penciller Bernie Wrightson, four-issue limited series, DC, 1988)
- Batman: A Death in the Family (with writer Jim Starlin and penciller Jim Aparo, four-issue storyline, DC, 1988–1989)
- Batman: A Lonely Place of Dying (with writers Marv Wolfman and George Pérez and pencillers Jim Aparo and Tom Grummett, five-issue storyline, DC, 1989)
- Superboy Special (with writer Stan Berkowitz and penciller Curt Swan, DC, 1992)
- The Death of Superman (with writer/penciller Dan Jurgens, DC, 1992)
- Predator vs. Magnus, Robot Fighter (with writers John Ostrander and Jim Shooter and penciller Lee Weeks, Dark Horse Comics/Valiant Comics, 1992-1993)
- Aliens: Rogue (with writer Ian Edginton and penciller Will Simpson, Dark Horse Comics, 1993)
- The Trouble with Girls (with writers Will Jacobs and Gerard Jones and pencillers Bret Blevins and Russ Miller, Epic Comics, 1993)
- War Machine (with writers Scott Benson and Len Kaminski, and pencillers Gabriel Gecko, Stewart Johnson and Geoff Senior, Marvel, 1993-1995)
- Sandman Mystery Theatre (with writers Matt Wagner and Steven T. Seagle, Vertigo, 1993–1999)
- Captain America (with writer Mark Waid and penciller Ron Garney, Marvel, 1995–1996)
- Amazon (with writer/penciller John Byrne and inks by Terry Austin, Amalgam Comics, 1996)
- Batman: Death of Innocents (with writer Dennis O'Neil and penciller Joe Staton, DC, 1996)
- Batman: GCPD (with writer Chuck Dixon and penciller Jim Aparo, DC, 1996)
- Batman: Gordon's Law (with writer Chuck Dixon and artist Klaus Janson, DC, 1996–1997)
- Adventures in the DC Universe (with writer Hilary J. Bader, DC, 1997)
- Anarky (with writer Alan Grant and penciller Norm Breyfogle, DC, 1997)
- Batman / Spider-Man (with J. M. DeMatteis and penciller Graham Nolan, DC/Marvel, 1997)
- Gen-Active (with writer Eric DeSantis and penciller Brian Stelfreeze, Wildstorm, 2000)
- Scene of the Crime (with writer Ed Brubaker and penciller Michael Lark, Vertigo, 2000)
- Red (with writer Warren Ellis and artist Cully Hamner, three-issue storyline, Wildstorm, 2003)
- Fight for Tomorrow (with writer Brian Wood and artist Denys Cowan, DC, 2002–2003)

== Awards ==
Costanza's lettering has been recognized by both peers and fans. The Academy of Comic Book Arts named him Best Letterer of 1974 (the Shazam Award), and in 1986 and 1987 he won the Comics Buyer's Guide Fan Award for Favorite Letterer for his work on Swamp Thing.
