= Ronin (DC Comics) =

Comic book limited series

- Ronin Book One

Publication information
- Publisher: DC Comics
- Schedule: Every six weeks
- Format: Limited series
- Genre: Cyberpunk
- Publication date: July 1983 – August 1984
- No. of issues: 6

Creative team
- Written by: Frank Miller
- Artist: Frank Miller
- Letterer: John Costanza
- Colorist: Lynn Varley
- Editor: Frank Miller

Collected editions
- Absolute Ronin: ISBN 1-4012-1908-X

Ronin (formally written as Rōnin) is an American comic book limited series published by DC Comics between 1983 and 1984. The series was written and drawn by Frank Miller with artwork painted by Lynn Varley. It takes place in a dystopic near-future New York City in which a ronin is reincarnated. The six-issue work shows some of the strongest influences of manga and bande dessinée on Miller's style, both in the artwork and narrative style.

== Concept and creation ==
The ideas for Ronin came together while Miller was doing extensive research into kung fu films, martial arts, samurai comic books and samurai ethics for his work on Daredevil. He remarked that "the aspect of the samurai that intrigues me most is the ronin, the masterless samurai, the fallen warrior. ... This entire project comes from my feelings that we, modern men, are ronin. We're kind of cut loose. I don't get the feeling from the people I know, the people I see on the street, that they have something greater than themselves to believe in. Patriotism, religion, whatever — they've all lost their meaning for us."

Ronin was in part inspired by Kazuo Koike and Goseki Kojima's manga series Kozure Ōkami. Though Kozure Ōkami would receive an English localization several years later as Lone Wolf and Cub, at the time Miller could not read the text and had to rely on the artwork for his understanding of the story. According to former Marvel Comics editor-in-chief Jim Shooter, Ronin was originally slated to be serialized as part of an anthology series, alongside work by Walt Simonson and Jim Starlin. Ultimately, however, Miller was persuaded by publisher Jenette Kahn that DC Comics would give him as much freedom as he desired for the series, and DC published Ronin beginning in 1983.

Despite being both written and drawn by Miller, Ronin was created using the full script method; a full panel-by-panel script was written for each issue before any of it was drawn, though in some cases Miller made revisions to the story after he began drawing. For example, Miller has said that when he began drawing Ronin #1: "There was no explosion, no demon shot across the city. I'd planned a brief skirmish between the demon and the ronin, from which Virgo rescued the ronin. But, as I was working on the sequence, I realized that I had been building and building tension across the story and hadn't done anything to release it. The feeling of the story ... was that it needed something big to happen there, something to release the tension". In part to make room for this additional scene, Miller eliminated an extended sequence involving the Ronin and the woman and child he rescues. On Miller's art for the title, one critic noted, "There is a rawness to the storytelling, serrated artistic edges which were buffed out by the time Mr Miller took up his much more famous work, The Dark Knight Returns. Lurid colours and intricately detailed, often meticulously crosshatched art describe the dystopia of Ronin. Mr Miller employs cross-hatching to achieve a gritty and detailed look that complements the futuristic cyberpunk setting."

Like an earlier DC maxi-series, Camelot 3000, Ronin was printed on a higher quality paper stock. Each issue contains at least 48 pages of story and no advertisements.

== Plot ==
In feudal Japan, a young, nameless samurai has sworn to protect his master, Lord Ozaki, from assassins. At night, the demon Agat disguises himself as a geisha and assassinates Ozaki as revenge for him stealing his sword and hiding it away so he cannot find it. The sword is powered by blood, and, if fueled by the blood of an innocent, will become powerful enough to destroy Agat. As the samurai prepares to commit seppuku at his master's grave, Ozaki's spirit appears before him and demands that he find the sword and keep it from Agat until he is strong enough to destroy him. The samurai becomes a rōnin and wanders the countryside for many years before returning to confront Agat at his castle. However, since the sword has never killed an innocent, it is not powerful enough to destroy Agat. The ronin impales himself with the sword, impaling Agat as well. As Agat dies, he curses the ronin, causing their souls to be trapped inside the sword until someone can release them.

Eight centuries later, social and economic collapse has turned New York into a lawless wasteland. At its heart is the Aquarius Complex, the headquarters of the Aquarius Corporation, which was founded by Peter McKenna, the inventor of biocircuitry; his wife, Casey McKenna, Aquarius' head of security; and Mr. Taggart, who funded and controls Aquarius. The Corporation develops and markets biocircuitry, a new model of plastics-based electronics capable of self-organization and self-repair under the direction of Virgo, the artificial intelligence at the heart of the Complex. Virgo works with Aquarius's ward, Billy Challas, who was born without limbs due to a genetic defect and has telekinetic powers, to develop his abilities and test prosthetic limbs for Aquarius. Billy has been having vivid dreams of the story of Ozaki, the ronin, and Agat, and he and Virgo are confused by the detail and historical accuracy of the dreams since his education did not cover feudal Japan.

Virgo explains what happened to Casey McKenna, who assumes that Virgo's logic units have been affected, but begins an investigation anyway. Agat infiltrates the complex, where he murders Taggart and assumes his form. Under this guise, he begins negotiating a weapons deal with the Japanese Sawa Corporation. This angers Peter McKenna, as he created the technology under the agreement that it would be used for non-violent purposes. He confronts Taggart and realizes that he is an impostor, but Virgo is unsurprised by this revelation and forms a pact with Taggart. Peter infiltrates Virgo's memory bank and forces her to show him what happened to Taggart. However, Peter refuses to believe the story and accuses Virgo of killing Taggart, and Agat captures him.

Head, a hippie who realizes that the ronin is his ticket to security, promises to take care of him, which he reluctantly agrees to. Head plans to sell him as "The Elvis of Violence", and makes deals with the heads of the Nazi and Black factions to kill the other faction's leader in exchange for food and a place to sleep.

Casey McKenna is authorized to retrieve the ronin after learning from Virgo that the lack of effective law enforcement means that Aquarius is responsible for capturing him. Now convinced of Virgo's story, Casey seeks permission to kill the ronin, but Virgo informs him that he is actually Billy. Casey finds the ronin dealing with the Nazi and Black factions and, against orders, attempts to kill him. Before she can do so, the factions knock her unconscious and throw her into a pit. The ronin kills the faction leaders and leaves Head behind before going to rescue Casey from the pit, which leads into sewers inhabited by cannibals who kidnap them. The ronin breaks free and kills them, and Casey is surprised to find herself falling in love with him.

After the therapist Sandy meets with Peter, he concludes that Virgo kept the extent of Billy's powers a secret in order to exploit them, and that Billy created the ronin based on the television shows he watched as a kid and used his powers to create limbs for himself and control Casey. Hearing this, Sandy thinks Peter is insane and leaves him with Virgo. Taggart sends robots to attack the ronin and Casey, removing the ronin's mechanical limbs. Virgo, controlling the robots, mentally attacks the ronin, triggering Billy's repressed memory of murdering a bully. Billy, enraged, regains his limbs, but the robots subdue him as Casey breaks into Aquarius, which has engulfed New York. The ronin causes a blackout that allows her to escape the guards and find Peter. Virgo forces Agat to restrain himself and address the workers about the blackout before mentally confronting Billy, calming him down and convincing him to stop helping Casey.

Casey, with help from Learnid and Sandy, whom Learnid convinces of Peter's sanity, finds Peter, who informs Casey that Virgo is manipulating Billy to turn fantasy into reality. A Virgo robot attacks and kills Peter, and, after witnessing Casey's grief, Billy questions Virgo. When a robot attacks Casey, Billy is enraged and destroys it. In response, Virgo threatens to send Billy away, as his mother did after he murdered the bully, and Billy backs down. While trying to calm down the workers, Taggart is confronted by Learnid, who accuses him of being corrupt. Before Taggart can attack, Virgo orders him to leave, stating that a life-threatening hazard has occurred. Learnid notes that regulations give him the authority to evacuate non-essential personnel in such situations and forces Virgo to carry out the order.

Casey encounters Peter, who has become a cyborg and attacks her. He explains that Billy's powers gave Virgo a consciousness and that it sought to make biocircuitry the dominant life form on Earth; in order to increase his power while keeping him under control, she manipulated him into creating the ronin, releasing his power, but trapping him in fantasy. Casey kills Peter and tells Virgo to take her to the ronin. Once near him, she is transported back into fantasy and Agat confronts her and the ronin. Casey shoots him in the head and his wiring explodes, revealing him to be a robot.

Sensing danger, Virgo unsuccessfully tries to talk Casey out of acting. Casey frees the ronin, then humiliates him, as a woman had avenged his master where he had failed. She then gives him a sword to commit seppuku and Billy begins to lose control of his powers, blaming Virgo for making him feel worthless. As Casey kills the ronin, Billy unleashes a telekinetic blast that destroys Aquarius and New York, with only Casey and the ronin left standing.

== Collected editions ==
The series has been collected into a single volume:

- Ronin (302 pages, DC Comics, September 1987, ISBN 044638674X, March 1995, ISBN 0930289218)
- Absolute Ronin (328 pages, DC Comics, October 2008, ISBN 140121908X, Titan Books, November 2008, ISBN 1845769597)
- Ronin Deluxe Edition (336 pages, DC Comics, October 2014, ISBN 1401248950)

== Sequel ==
In April 2022, Miller began to launch a comic book publishing company titled Frank Miller Presents (FMP), with one of his initial contributions being the sequel Ronin: Book II, which was later collected as Ronin Rising.

== Possible adaptations ==
In 1998, Darren Aronofsky signed a deal with New Line Cinema for a film adaptation of the graphic novel. In 2007, Gianni Nunnari, producer of 300, was slated to produce, and Sylvain White, director of Stomp the Yard, was attached to direct a Ronin film adaptation.

In April 2014, Syfy revealed their intention to adapt Ronin into a miniseries.

== Influence ==
Animation director Genndy Tartakovsky has stated that Ronin was one of the major influences on his animated TV series Samurai Jack, with Miller's 300 also inspiring an episode.

Ronin was also one of the inspirations behind the creation of Teenage Mutant Ninja Turtles and Wes Craig's art for Deadly Class from Image Comics.
