= The Dark Knight Returns =

1986 four-issue comic book miniseries by Frank Miller

- Cover of Issue #1

Publication information
- Publisher: DC Comics
- Schedule: Monthly
- Format: Limited series
- Publication date: February – June 1986
- No. of issues: 4
- Main characters: Batman; Jim Gordon; Carrie Kelley; Two-Face; Mutants; Joker; Superman

Creative team
- Written by: Frank Miller
- Penciller: Frank Miller
- Inker: Klaus Janson
- Letterer: John Costanza
- Colorist: Lynn Varley
- Editor(s): Dick Giordano; Dennis O'Neil

Collected editions
- Trade Paperback: ISBN 0930289137
- Hardcover: ISBN 0930289153
- Trade Paperback (Warner Books): ISBN 0446385050
- Trade Paperback (Titan Books): ISBN 0907610900
- 10th Anniversary Edition: ISBN 156389341X
- 2002 Edition: ISBN 156389341X
- Absolute Edition: ISBN 1401210791
- Noir: ISBN 1401255140
- Dark Knight Saga: ISBN 1401256910
- 30th Anniversary Edition: ISBN 1401263119
- Book with Blu-ray & DVD set: ISBN 1401264271
- Gallery Edition: ISBN 1401264433
- Collector's Edition: ISBN 1401270131
- Compact Edition: ISBN 1799507866
- 40th Anniversary Deluxe Edition: ISBN 9781799513100

The Dark Knight Returns (alternatively titled Batman: The Dark Knight Returns but originally titled Batman: The Dark Knight) is a 1986 four-issue superhero comic book miniseries written by Frank Miller and illustrated by Miller and Klaus Janson, with color by Lynn Varley, and published by DC Comics. It tells an alternative story of millionaire Bruce Wayne who, at 55 years old, returns from a decade of retirement as Batman to fight crime while facing opposition from the Gotham City police force and the United States government.

When originally published, each issue in the series had a unique title (The Dark Knight Returns, The Dark Knight Triumphant, Hunt the Dark Knight, and The Dark Knight Falls), but the title of the first issue was applied to the entire series when it was collected into a single volume. Some of the earliest collected editions also bore the shorter series title. The story introduces Carrie Kelley as the new Robin and the hyper-violent street gang known as the Mutants. In the Pre-Flashpoint DC Multiverse, the events of The Dark Knight Returns and its associated titles were designated to occur on Earth-31.

The miniseries has since been followed by a number of sequels: The Dark Knight Strikes Again, The Dark Knight III: The Master Race, and Dark Knight Returns: The Golden Child. A one-shot prequel, Dark Knight Returns: The Last Crusade, takes place ten years before the original series. Both Batman: Year One and All Star Batman & Robin, the Boy Wonder are considered by Miller to be canonical. Likewise, Superman: Year One takes place in the Dark Knight universe.

The Dark Knight Returns is widely considered to be one of the greatest and most influential Batman stories of all time, as well as one of the greatest works of comic art in general, and has been noted for helping reintroduce a darker and more mature-oriented version of the character (and superheroes in general) to pop culture during the 1980s. Various elements of the series have since been incorporated into depictions of Batman in other media, while a direct animated adaptation of the story, Batman: The Dark Knight Returns, was released as a two-part film across 2012 and 2013.

== Plot ==
=== Part 1: The Dark Knight Returns ===
Over a decade after the United Nations outlawed superheroes and the Joker murdered Batman's protégé, Robin (Jason Todd), (Note: As depicted in Dark Knight Returns: The Last Crusade (2016)) a 55-year-old Bruce Wayne battles alcoholism in a dystopian 1986. Having long abandoned his mantle, he remains deeply estranged from Jason's predecessor, Dick Grayson. Batman's absence has left Gotham City overrun by crime, much of it driven by a gang called "the Mutants". Haunted by his parents' murder and spurred by the Mutants' escalating crimes, Wayne ends his retirement to return to his role as vigilante. After thwarting multiple assaults—including one on young Carrie Kelley—he targets the Mutants, whose leader publicly vows to kill him personally. Batman's return is reported on the news, prompting the Joker to awaken from catatonia at Arkham Asylum.

Batman foils a group of criminals working for Harvey Dent. Previously known as Two-Face, Dent underwent extensive therapy and plastic surgery to reenter society before disappearing. Batman informs close-to-retirement Commissioner James "Jim" Gordon that Dent may be planning a larger scheme. Soon after, Dent announces his intention to hold Gotham ransom with a bomb. Batman defeats Dent, whose psyche has now completely warped into his Two-Face persona.

=== Part 2: The Dark Knight Triumphant ===
At the White House, Superman and President Ronald Reagan discuss Batman's actions, with the latter suggesting he may have to be arrested. In Gotham, Kelley, inspired by Batman, buys an imitation Robin costume and searches for him. Batman attacks the Mutants at the city dump with the Batmobile, but the Mutant Leader goads him into a hand-to-hand fight and beats Batman to near-death. Kelley creates a diversion that allows her and Batman to retreat to the Batcave, where Wayne's butler Alfred Pennyworth tends to his wounds. Impressed with her bravery, Wayne decides to make Kelley his new protégée. Batman returns to strategically defeat the Mutant Leader in front of his followers, who splinter into smaller gangs as a result; one faction renames itself the "Sons of the Batman" and adopts violent tactics against the underworld.

=== Part 3: Hunt the Dark Knight ===
Clark Kent talks with Wayne and is then deployed by Washington to the fictional Latin American country of Corto Maltese, where he fights Soviet combat forces in a conflict that may escalate into World War III.

Gordon's successor as commissioner, Captain Ellen Yindel, declares Batman a wanted criminal. Meanwhile, Joker manipulates his caretakers to allow him onto a television talk show, where he murders everyone with his trademark toxin and escapes. Batman and Robin (Kelley) track him to a county fair while evading a Gotham police pursuit. Batman fights Joker, vowing to stop him permanently. Batman paralyzes Joker but stops short of taking his life. Disappointed with Batman's refusal to kill him, Joker breaks his own neck and dies.

=== Part 4: The Dark Knight Falls ===
A citywide manhunt for Batman begins. Elsewhere, Superman diverts a Soviet nuclear warhead which detonates in a desert, nearly killing him in the process, and survives only by absorbing the sun's energy from the plants in a nearby jungle. The United States is hit by an electromagnetic pulse as a result and descends into chaos during the following blackout. In Gotham, Batman and Robin turn the remaining Mutants and Sons of the Batman into a non-lethal vigilante gang, making Gotham the safest city in the country. Embarrassed, the U.S. government orders Superman to take Batman into custody. Superman demands to meet Batman, and Wayne chooses Crime Alley.

Superman tries to reason with Batman, but Batman uses his technological inventions to fight him on equal ground. During the battle, Superman compromises Batman's exoframe. However, an aging Oliver Queen manages to shoot Superman with a kryptonite-tipped arrow to weaken him, which allows Batman to beat him into submission. Standing over the defeated Superman, Batman has a sudden heart attack, apparently dying. Alfred destroys the Batcave and Wayne Manor before suffering a fatal stroke, exposing Batman as Bruce Wayne, whose fortune has disappeared. After Wayne's funeral, it is revealed that his death was staged using an antiarrhythmic agent that suspended his vital life signs. Clark attends the funeral and winks at the disguised Carrie after hearing Wayne's heartbeat before she starts digging him out. Some time afterward, Bruce Wayne, now looking forward to life, leads Robin, Queen, and the rest of his followers into the caverns beyond the Batcave to continue his war on crime.

== Characters ==
- Bruce Wayne / Batman: Bruce Wayne is 55 years old and has been retired from his Batman persona for a decade. When he sees violence becoming more common not just in Gotham City but also the world, he feels a strong desire to return as Batman and emerges from his depression.
- Alfred Pennyworth: Wayne's trusted butler, medic, and confidant; now in his 80s.
- Carrie Kelley / Robin: A 13-year-old girl with absentee parents, who later becomes Batman's sidekick, Robin. Throughout the story, she is frequently mistaken for the former "Boy Wonder". After she saves the Dark Knight's life, the aging Batman places his trust in her against Alfred's wishes.
- James "Jim" Gordon: The elderly Commissioner of the Gotham City Police Department, who retires on his 70th birthday. He is aware of Batman's true identity.
- Harvey Dent / Two-Face: Having spent 12 years in Arkham Asylum, Harvey Dent has been treated by Doctor Wolper for three years and his face has been repaired with plastic surgery. Dent's doctor gives him a clean bill of mental health, but he is still Two-Face in his mind. Dent terrorizes the city with his face swathed in bandages as he now perceives both sides of his face as scarred.
- Joker: The Clown Prince of Crime and Batman's archenemy, who has been in a catatonic state at Arkham Asylum since the latter's retirement and awakens from it upon learning of his re-emergence. He plans a violent crime spree to draw out Batman, setting in motion the events leading to their final confrontation.
- The Mutant Leader: The ambitious, brutal, and albino head of the Mutants, who seeks to control Gotham and kill anyone who opposes him.
- Dr. Bartholomew Wolper: Two-Face and Joker's psychiatrist and opponent of Batman's "fascist" vigilantism. Wolper is convinced that the Joker and Two-Face are both victims of Batman's crusade. He is killed by the Joker's robot doll, which snaps Wolper's neck then floods the television studio they're in with poisonous gas.
- Ellen Yindel: James Gordon's successor as Commissioner. A captain in the Gotham City Police Department, she is a critic of Batman, but begins to doubt herself after the Joker's crime spree.
- The Mayor of Gotham City: The weak-willed and inept unnamed mayor of Gotham City. He tries to negotiate peace with the Mutant Leader at the time he was in police custody, only to be killed by him.
- Deputy Mayor Stevenson: The deputy mayor of Gotham City, who later becomes the new mayor after the former mayor is killed by the Mutant Leader. He states that Commissioner Ellen Yindel will decide how to act with Batman.
- Ronald Reagan: The President of the United States. He instructs Superman to deal with Batman in Gotham City.
- Oliver Queen: After superheroes are outlawed, Queen undertakes a clandestine rebellion against government oppression, including the sinking of a nuclear submarine. He lost his left arm after an encounter with Superman. Despite this disability, Queen is still a highly skilled marksman.
- Kal-El / Clark Kent / Superman: Superman is now an agent of the U.S. government and his secret identity as the former Daily Planet reporter Clark Kent is publicly known. In his inner thoughts, he despises being a government tool, but he believes it is the only way he can save lives in this day and age. Because of his Kryptonian physique, his aging process is slower than his former allies', which is one of the reasons why he is no longer able to hide his secret identity. In the final climax, Superman battles Batman in a final attempt to rid the government of his opposition but is weakened by a Kryptonite arrow fired by Queen, allowing an armored Batman to stand up to him.
- Selina Kyle: No longer the Catwoman, Selina Kyle now runs an escort business.
- Lana Lang: The managing editor of the Daily Planet who is an outspoken supporter of Batman, appearing on a series of TV debates in which she argues with others over his methods and influence.
- Dave Endochrine: A late-night talk show host who invites the Joker and Dr. Wolper on his show; he and his audience are later killed by the Joker's poisonous gas. He is a characterization of David Letterman.
- Lola Chong: A Gotham City news anchor who serves as the story's main talking head, providing exposition and narration in the form of her reporting.
- Louis Gallagher: The Gotham City Police Department's director of media relations. He undermines Gordon by leaking information to the press and criticising him in public. He advises the Mayor to appoint Yindel as Police Commissioner.
- Nathan Briggs: A four-star United States Army general who secretly sells weapons to the Mutants to fund his wife's cancer treatment. He commits suicide after being confronted by Batman.
- Bruno: The leader of a group of neo-Nazi criminals. Working for the Joker, she battles Batman and Robin but is caught by Superman.
- Fat Abner: The Joker's hulking henchman. He builds bombs for Two-Face that he sabotages on the Joker's orders, then robotic flying dolls armed with explosives and poison gas in order to kill the Joker's TV audience and terrorize the county fair; he attacks Robin on the fair's roller coaster tracks, and is accidentally killed in the fight.
- Rob and Don: Two Mutants who are among the members of the gang tricked by Robin into witnessing Batman's defeat of their leader at a sewage runoff pit. Because of this they switch allegiances to Bruno and join her in robbing a liquor store, but are easily taken out by Batman.
- The Sons of Batman (S.O.B.): A group of teenagers who were formerly Mutants. They become vigilante followers of Batman after witnessing him defeat their leader, although they are unruly and violent, taking overly severe measures to punish criminals and even some civilians.

== Background and creation ==
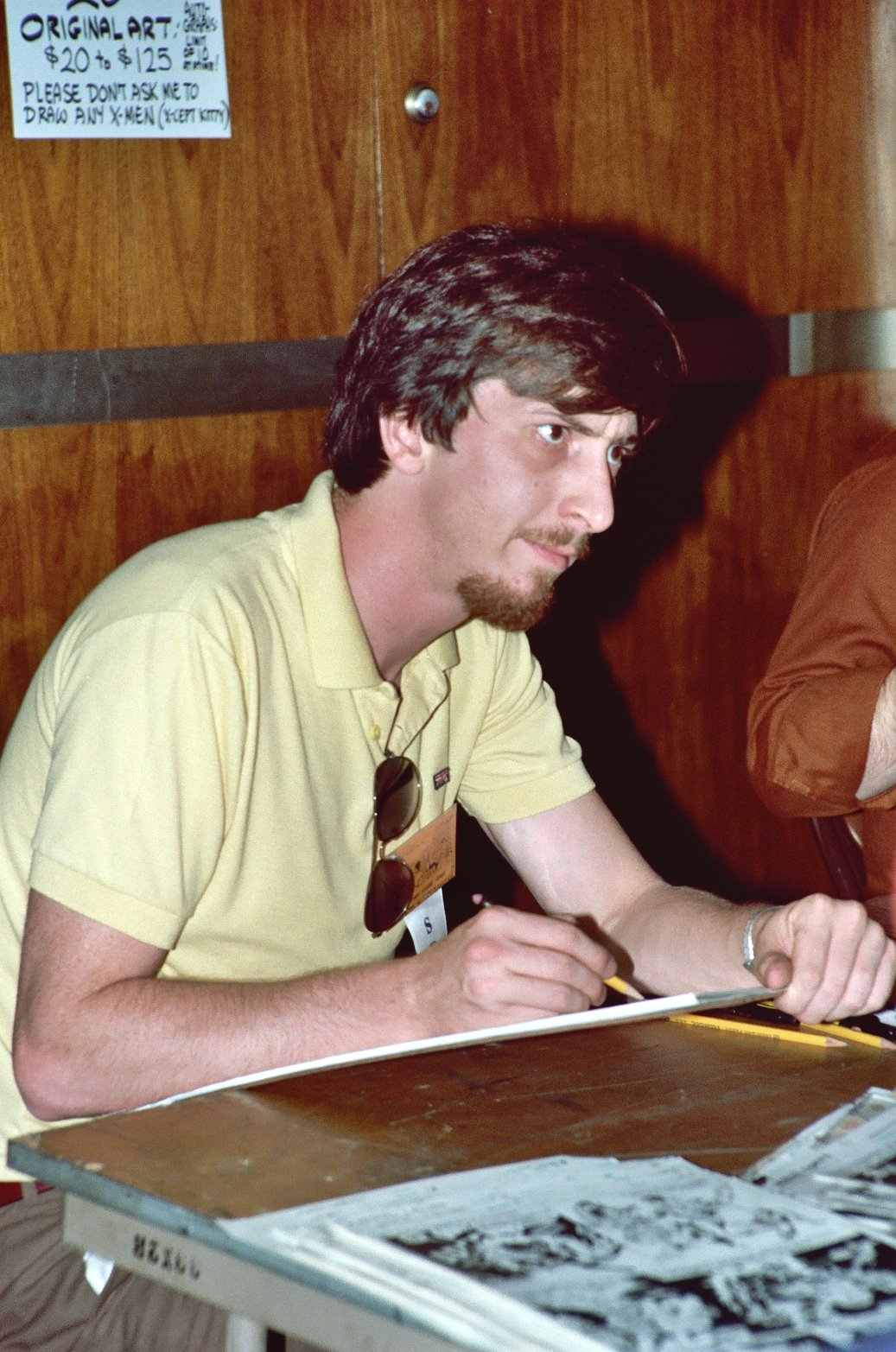
Comic creator Frank Miller at the 1982 San Diego Comic-Con

Since the 1950s, when the Comics Code Authority was established, the character of Batman had drifted from his darker, more serious roots. It was not until the 1970s when the character began to feature in darker stories once again; however, Batman was still commonly associated with the campy theme of the 1960s Batman TV series, and was regarded more as a father figure to Robin rather than as his original identity as a vigilante.

In the early 1980s, DC Comics promoted Batman group editor Dick Giordano to editorial director for the company. Writer-artist Frank Miller was recruited to create The Dark Knight Returns. Giordano said he worked with Miller on the story's plot, and said, "[t]he version that was finally done was about his fourth or fifth draft. The basic storyline was the same but there were a lot of detours along the way."

"With Batman, you've got a character that you can describe in just a few seconds: His parents were murdered by criminals; he's warring on crime for the rest of his life," Miller explained in the documentary Comic Book Confidential. "He was created in 1938, and the character was just ruthless in his methods, terrifying to criminals. Over the years, that got softened and softened, because people started thinking that comics had to be just for kids... and Batman had to be made much nicer. And eventually, no kid could relate to him anymore."

During the creation of the series, fellow comics writer/artist John Byrne told Miller, "Robin must be a girl", and Miller agreed. Miller said that the comic series' plot was inspired by Dirty Harry, specifically the 1983 film Sudden Impact, in which Dirty Harry returns to crime-fighting after a lengthy convalescence. The series employed a 16-panel grid for its pages. Each page was composed of either a combination of 16 panels, or anywhere between sixteen and one panel per page. Giordano left the project halfway through because of disagreements over production deadlines. Comics historian Les Daniels wrote that Miller's idea of ignoring deadlines was "the culmination of the quest towards artistic independence".

While the comic's ending features Batman faking his death and leading up the Sons of Batman to continue with his crusade against crime, symbolizing that Bruce Wayne dies but Batman lives on, this wasn't the original intention. During the MCM London Comic Con 2018, Miller revealed that in his original plans for the ending of The Dark Knight Returns, Batman was going to be gunned down by the police while fighting them, but the story got away from him and changed his mind.

The four issues of The Dark Knight Returns were presented in packaging that included extra pages, square binding, card-stock covers, and glossy paper to highlight the watercolor paintings by colorist Lynn Varley.

== Collected editions ==
The entire series has been collected in trade paperbacks, hardcovers, an absolute edition, a noir edition, and a deluxe edition.

- Trade paperback (ISBN 0930289137) and hardcover (ISBN 0930289153), DC Comics, 1986.
- Trade paperback (ISBN 0446385050), Warner Books, 1986.
- Trade paperback (ISBN 0907610900), Titan Books, 1986.
- 10th Anniversary Edition, trade paperback (ISBN 1563893428) and hardcover (ISBN 156389341X), DC Comics, 1996.
- 10th Anniversary Edition, trade paperback (ISBN 1852867981) and hardcover (ISBN 1852867884), Titan Books, 1997.
- 2002 Edition, trade paperback (ISBN 1563893428) and hardcover (ISBN 156389341X), DC Comics, 2002. (Note that the ISBN numbers share the same numbers as the 10th anniversary edition.)
- Absolute Edition, hardcover (ISBN 1401210791), DC Comics, 2006.
- Noir Edition, hardcover (ISBN 1401255140), DC Comics, 2015.
- Dark Knight Saga Deluxe Edition, hardcover (ISBN 1401256910), DC Comics, 2015.
- 30th Anniversary Edition, trade paperback (ISBN 1401263119), DC Comics, 2016.
- Book with Blu-ray & DVD set, hardcover (ISBN 1401264271), DC Comics, 2016.
- Gallery Edition, hardcover (ISBN 1401264433), DC Comics, 2016.
- Collector's Edition, hardcover (ISBN 1401270131), DC Comics, 2016.
- 40th Anniversary Deluxe Edition, trade paperback (ISBN 1799517586) and hardcover (ISBN 1799513106), DC Comics, 2026.

== Reception ==
Despite the cost of the single-issue packaging, The Dark Knight Returns sold well. Pricing it at $2.95 an issue, DC Comics promoted The Dark Knight Returns as a "thought-provoking action story". Time said the series' depiction of a "semi-retired Batman [who] is unsure about his crime-fighting abilities" was an example of trying to appeal to "today's skeptical readers". More than one million comics were printed.

Retrospectively, the series is today widely considered one of the greatest works in the comic medium. IGN Comics ranked The Dark Knight Returns first on a list of the 25 greatest Batman graphic novels and called The Dark Knight Returns "a true masterpiece of storytelling" with "[s]cene after unforgettable scene." In 2005, Time chose the collected edition as one of the 10 best English language graphic novels ever written. Forbidden Planet placed the collected issue at number one on its "50 Best of the Best Graphic Novels" list. Writer Matthew K. Manning in the "1980s" chapter of DC Comics: Year By Year: A Visual Chronicle (2010) called the series "arguably the best Batman story of all time." It was placed second in a poll among comic book academics conducted by the Sequart Organization.

The series also garnered some negative reviews. In April 2010, Nicolas Slayton from Comics Bulletin ranked The Dark Knight Returns second in his Tuesday Top Ten feature's Top 10 Overrated Comic Books behind Watchmen. Slayton wrote, "[t]here is no central plot to the comic, leaving only a forced fight scene between Superman and Batman as an out of place climax to the story." "Gone are the traits that define Batman," he said, also citing "misuse of the central character." Some critics debate the story's connection to themes of fascism and vigilantism.

== Influence ==
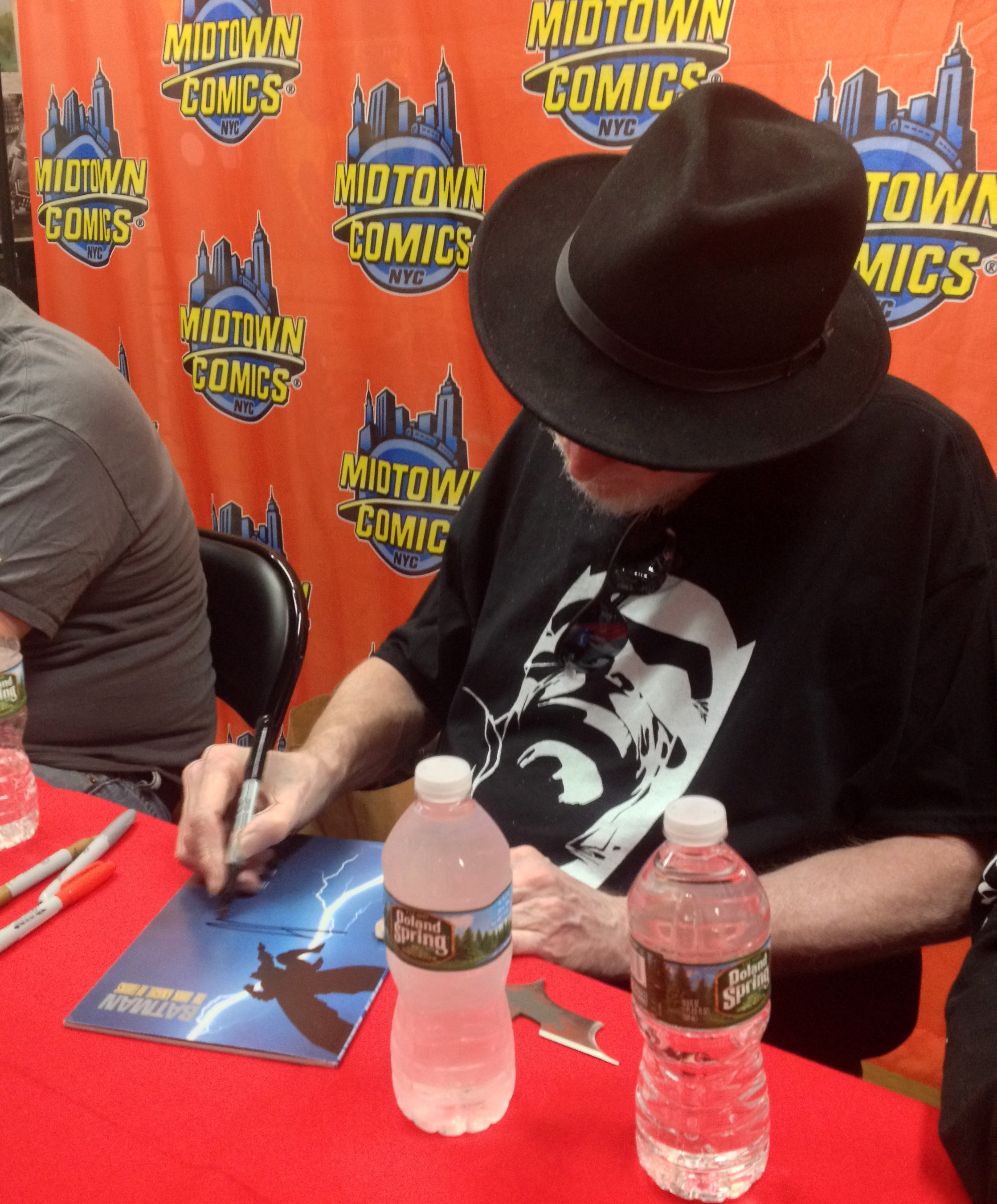
Miller signing a copy of the book during a 2016 appearance at Midtown Comics

The immense popularity of The Dark Knight Returns served both to return the character of Batman to a central role in pop culture, but also (along with Watchmen) started the era known as the Dark Age of Comic Books (also known as the Modern Age and the Iron Age). The grim, seedy versions of Gotham and Batman updated the character's identity from the campy Adam West version from the 1960s Batman TV series, and proved critically and commercially successful enough that a new wave of "dark" superheroes were either created or re-popularized, and preexisting heroes were redesigned or retooled to fit this new trend.

The Dark Knight Returns was one of the two comic books, alongside Watchmen, that inspired designer Vincent Connare when he created the Comic Sans font.

In 2022, Heritage Auctions sold the original cover art for the first issue of Miller's Batman: The Dark Knight Returns for $2.4 million, making it the most expensive mainstream American comic book cover art sold publicly.

== Sequels, prequels, and spin-offs ==
=== Batman: Year One (1987) ===
- Writer: Frank Miller; Artist: David Mazzucchelli
- The story recounts Batman's first year as a crime-fighter as well as exploring the life of recently transferred Gotham police detective James Gordon – eventually building towards their first encounter and their eventual alliance against Gotham's criminal underworld. The story is considered canon to the mainstream DC Universe as well as Frank Miller's own Dark Knight Universe.

=== Spawn/Batman (1994) ===
- Writer: Frank Miller; Artist: Todd McFarlane
- Batman and Spawn meet while tracking the same villain, and begrudgingly have to put aside their differences for the fight ahead.
- Despite its release as a companion piece to The Dark Knight Returns, the events of Spawn/Batman have no relevance to other works in the series.

=== The Dark Knight Strikes Again (2001) ===
- Writer/Artist: Frank Miller; Colorist: Lynn Varley
- An aged Bruce Wayne who returns from three years in hiding, training his followers and instigating a rebellion against Lex Luthor's dictatorial rule over the United States. The series features an ensemble cast of superheroes including Catgirl, Superman, Wonder Woman, Plastic Man, Green Arrow, The Flash, and the Atom.

=== The Dark Knight III: The Master Race (2015) ===
- Writers: Frank Miller and Brian Azzarello; Artists: Frank Miller, Andy Kubert, and Klaus Janson
- Ray Palmer restores 1,000 of the inhabitants of Kandor to full-size, but they immediately begin to terrorize the Earth. Batman sets out to assemble his former allies against the invaders.

=== The Dark Knight Returns: The Last Crusade (2016) ===
- Writers: Frank Miller and Brian Azzarello; Artists: John Romita Jr. and Peter Steigerwald
- A prequel one-shot. As the Joker is manically returned to Arkham Asylum, Bruce Wayne is struggling to train his sidekick and heir apparent, the new Robin, Jason Todd. While a new string of bizarre killing sprees involving Gotham City's elite take up Batman and Robin's attention, critics begin to question if the Dark Knight has a right to endanger the life of a child.

=== Superman: Year One (2019) ===
- Writer: Frank Miller; Artist: John Romita Jr.
- Superman learns to balance the grave responsibilities of his powers against their limitless possibilities, and about the wonder of his adopted world.

=== Dark Knight Returns: The Golden Child (2019) ===
- Writer: Frank Miller; Artists: Rafael Grampá
- It's been three years since the events of The Dark Knight III: The Master Race. Lara has spent time learning to be more human, and Carrie Kelley has been growing into her new role as Batwoman. But a terrifying evil has returned to Gotham City in the form of a teamed up Joker and Darkseid, and Lara and Carrie must team up to stop this growing threat—and they have a secret weapon. Young Jonathan Kent, "The Golden Child," has a power inside of him unlike anything the world has ever seen.

=== Deadpool/Batman (2025) ===
An intercompany crossover one-shot published in September 2025 by Marvel Comics features seven short anthology stories, one featuring Miller's Batman with Old Man Logan. The second one-shot Batman/Deadpool was published in November 2025 by DC Comics.

==== Showdown ====
- Writer/Artist: Frank Miller
- In a dystopian version of Gotham City, an aged–Wolverine begins a brutal fight with an aged–Batman. To end the fight, Batman plants explosives on Wolverine’s belt buckle, which detonate. Despite his injuries, Wolverine vows to fight him again.

=== Other works ===
According to Miller, the unfinished series All Star Batman & Robin, the Boy Wonder can be considered a prequel.

In 1994, this version of Batman appeared in the Zero Hour: Crisis in Time crossover event playing a small role. In March 2018, he appeared in a brief cameo in the sixth and final issue of the Dark Nights: Metal event.

In 2018, it was announced that this version of Robin, Carrie Kelley, would receive a spin-off in the form of a young adult graphic novel to be written by Miller with art from Ben Caldwell. In November 2021, when Miller said "[The Carrie Kelley book] is shaping up great; Ben is just a powder keg of talent. It'd probably be out now but it just keeps growing, due to his enthusiasm and output. I'm already kind of tugging at his sleeve about doing something else after this."

In 2023, Miller's Batman appeared in Batman #135, which marked the milestone of the 900th issue. He joined forces with various versions of Batman from different media across the multiverse.

== In other media ==
=== Television ===
==== Live-action ====
- Stephen Amell appears as an older Oliver Queen in the Legends of Tomorrow episode "Star City 2046", with a grey goatee and missing his left arm, a nod to the portrayal of the character in The Dark Knight Returns. This version of Oliver appears again in the crossover "Crisis on Infinite Earths" which designates the events of "Star City 2046" not just as an alternate timeline but taking place on Earth-16.
- In the episode "The Gentle Art of Making Enemies" of Gotham, the show's first Proto-Joker, Jerome Valeska (played by Cameron Monaghan), confronts Bruce Wayne in a house of mirrors after the GCPD raid Jerome's carnival populated by his cult followers, which pays homage to Batman and Joker's final confrontation in The Dark Knight Returns. In addition, Monaghan's performance as the second Proto-Joker, Jeremiah Valeska, took some influence from the Joker in the comic.
- In the Batwoman episode of the "Crisis on Infinite Earths" crossover, Kevin Conroy appears as Bruce Wayne from Earth-99. This version is more violent to the point of killing, as Joker is dead. While confronting Supergirl, Bruce quotes the comic while talking about how Clark always said "yes" to anyone with a badge or a flag, giving them too much power. Bruce says "Life only makes sense if you force it to" before attacking Supergirl with Kryptonite.
- In the Gotham Knights TV series, Carrie Kelley plays a prominent role as one of the main characters. In the episode "Under Pressure", Carrie defeats the Mutant gang leader who is given the name of Vernon Wagner, stoking conflict between the Mutant gang against the GCPD. In the same episode, Carrie relates the circumstances of her first meeting with Batman, which seemingly involve Batman being tossed by the Mutant gang into her fire escape outside her window, a description that is identical to the comic's depiction.

==== Animation ====
- In the episode "Legends of the Dark Knight" of The New Batman Adventures, a scene is directly based on both of Batman's fights with the Mutant leader, who was voiced by Kevin Michael Richardson. Michael Ironside voiced The Dark Knight Returns version of Batman.
- The first episode of Batman Beyond, "Rebirth", depicts a similarly aged Bruce Wayne repeat the book's line "never again" upon deciding to give up the Batman mantle.
- Two members of the Mutant gang are shown throwing snowballs at an older Beast Boy in a cage in the episode "How Long Is Forever?" of Teen Titans.
- The Batman episode "Artifacts", set in a future Gotham, mostly references Miller's work, with the future Batman depicted as similarly tall and muscular and Mr. Freeze going so far as speaking the sentence "The Dark Knight returns" upon meeting his nemesis.
- There are some references in Batman: The Brave and the Bold. In the season 1 episode "Legends of the Dark Mite!", Bat-Mite transforms Batman into alternate versions of himself, one of which has his look from The Dark Knight Returns. In the season 2 episode "The Knights of Tomorrow!", the Mutant gang is seen robbing a bank in a future where Bruce Wayne's son, Damian, is the new Batman. The battle between Batman and Superman is featured in the season 3 episode "Battle of the Super-Heroes!", where Batman wears a similar armored suit as well as some moments of the fight taken straight out of the comic.
- In the episode "Play Date", from Justice League Action, Batman's entrance uses the iconic cover pose.

=== Film ===
==== Live action ====
- Along with Batman: The Killing Joke, Tim Burton has mentioned that The Dark Knight Returns influenced his film adaptation of Batman.
- In the 1995 film Batman Forever, director Joel Schumacher uses some elements of the comic: when Bruce remembers falling into the cave as a child, and in a deleted scene when GNN News gives Batman a bad reputation after his fight with Two-Face in the Gotham Subway and when he follows Two-Face in a helicopter.
- According to Schumacher, he proposed a film adaptation of The Dark Knight Returns when Warner Bros. commissioned him and writer Akiva Goldsman to create a sequel to Batman Forever, but the idea was shelved in favor of Batman & Robin. After the cancellation of Batman Unchained, Schumacher proposed an adaptation of The Dark Knight Returns, which Warner considered during their attempts to revamp the character. Michael Keaton (who portrayed Batman in Batman and in Batman Returns) and Clint Eastwood were considered to play Batman while singer David Bowie was considered again to play the Joker. However, the project was finally canceled in favor of the also shelved Batman: DarKnight.
- The Tumbler in Batman Begins (2005) was inspired by the Batmobile in The Dark Knight Returns. Both Batmobiles are designed as large, military vehicles built for special purposes.
- In the 2012 film The Dark Knight Rises, director Christopher Nolan used a number of stories including The Dark Knight Returns as influence for the film. After the death of Rachel Dawes, Bruce Wayne retires from Batman and spends the next eight years in a depressed state caused by his experiences as a vigilante. Bruce decides to return as Batman when he realizes that The League of Shadows has returned to Gotham; Bruce uses a special brace for his leg to compensate for his frail physicality, similar to the comics, in which he uses a brace to support his damaged arm; During a police chase, two officers witness Batman's unexpected return and the older officer comments to his younger partner, "You're in for a show, kid", a line from a similar scene in the comic. After Batman kills Harvey Dent The Dark Knight, he becomes a fugitive, as in the comic with the Joker. In both works, Bruce fakes his death at the end; to fight crime secretly in the comic and to have a normal life with Selina Kyle in the film.
- Director Zack Snyder stated that although the 2016 film Batman v Superman: Dawn of Justice features an original premise, the film does borrow some elements from The Dark Knight Returns. In both, Batman is older and hardened, in his mid-50s in the comic and in his 40s in the film. Similarly, Robin has died, although his identity is never stated in the film, with Snyder intending for him to be Dick Grayson and a behind-the-scenes video as well as the Warner Bros. Studio Tour Hollywood stating it was Jason Todd. Batman is also less averse to using lethal force to the point of using guns to dispatch enemies. Further, Batman has a fateful confrontation with Superman, who is coerced to fight him, although by Lex Luthor instead of the U.S. government as in the comics. The Batsuit and the armored suit also both closely resemble the ones shown in the comic. There are also a few shots in the film directly taken from the pages of Miller's work.
- The talk show host David Endochrine from The Dark Knight Returns served as inspiration for the character Murray Franklin in the 2019 film Joker, played by Robert De Niro. Joker is interviewed on a talk show, similar to the comic. In both portrayals, the interview ends with the Joker committing murder on the set. The elderly sex therapist from the book, Dr. Ruth Weisenheimer, who Joker forcefully kisses during the interview also appears in the film, named Dr. Sally instead.
- The 2021 film Zack Snyder's Justice League featured a version of the Batmobile similar to the one from The Dark Knight Returns. In the film's epilogue, Batman is seen standing on a Batmobile (as it is seen in Miller's miniseries) after apprehending the Mutants.
- In an interview with the Hollywood Reporter, Zack Snyder expressed interest in returning to DC Films if he were to direct a live action adaptation of The Dark Knight Returns as a "true representation of the graphic novel".

==== Animation ====
- DC Entertainment produced a two-part animated film adaptation, starring Peter Weller as the voice of Batman. Part 1 was released on DVD/Blu-ray on September 25, 2012, and Part 2 on January 29, 2013.
- The 2018 animated film Teen Titans Go! To the Movies had Robin dream up a sequence which seems to parody The Lion King, where he is lifted up by the Batman from The Dark Knight Returns continuity. Later on, Robin appears in a musical sequence where he parodies the iconic Dark Knight Returns cover where Robin poses against a lightning effect with the title: "Robin: The Dark Hero Returns"

=== Comic books ===
- Carrie makes her first canonical appearance in the mainstream DC Universe in The New 52's Batman and Robin (vol. 2) #19 (titled Batman and Red Robin). She is a college student and the late Damian Wayne's drama instructor. As a homage to The Dark Knight Returns, she wears an imitation Robin costume as a Halloween costume in her first appearance.
- Batman/Bruce Wayne and Carrie Kelley/Robin appear in a one-page article in Comics Collector #8 (Krause Publications, summer 1985), predating their first comic book appearance.

=== Merchandise ===
In 1996, to commemorate the tenth anniversary of the graphic novel, DC released a new hardcover and a later softcover release. These included original rough script text for issue #4 with some sketches by Miller. There was also a limited edition slipcased hardcover that included mini poster prints, collected media reviews, and a sketchbook by Miller. DC Direct released a limited edition statue of Batman and Robin designed by Miller. It was released in full size and then later as a mini-sized statue. DC Direct released a series of Batman action figures based on The Dark Knight Returns in 2004. It included figures of Batman, Robin, Superman, and The Joker. Later, a Batman and Joker Gift Set was released, including both characters with new color schemes to reflect earlier points in the story, and a 48-page prestige format reprint of The Dark Knight Returns #1 was also released. An action figure of Batman as he appears in The Dark Knight Returns was released by Mattel in 2013, as part of their Batman Unlimited line of action figures.

In 2022, Cryptozoic Entertainment released a Batman: The Dark Knight Returns board game designed specifically for solitaire play. The game uses extensive amounts of art from the graphic novel and follows the story of The Dark Knight Returns, including 4 games mirroring the books as a campaign.

=== Miscellaneous ===
- In the episode "Girl Meets the New Teacher" of Girl Meets World, the new English teacher Harper Burgess gives out copies for her class to study, which creates controversy with the principal who disapproves of the comic.
- In the Rick and Morty season 6 episode "Solaricks", The Dark Knight Returns is mentioned by the original version of Jerry Smith as one of the books he read at a Barnes & Noble to overcome the grief of losing his family.

== Bibliography ==
- Daniels, Les (1999). Batman: The Complete History. Chronicle Books. ISBN 0811842320.
