= Lynn Varley =

American comic book colorist (born 1958)

- Area: Colourist
- Notable works: Ronin; The Dark Knight Returns; Elektra Lives Again; 300
- Awards: Eisner Award, 1999; Harvey Award, 1999; Comics Buyer's Guide Award, 1986, 1999, 2000
- Spouse: Frank Miller (m. 1986; div. 2005)

Lynn Varley is an American comic book colorist, notable for her collaborations with her then-husband, comic book writer/artist Frank Miller.

== Biography ==
Varley grew up in Livonia, Michigan. Moving to New York City, she found work at Neal Adams' Continuity Associates. She debuted as a comic book colorist on Batman Annual # 8 (1982), written by Mike W. Barr and penciled by her then partner Trevor Von Eeden. Around the same time, she became professionally involved with Upstart Associates, a shared studio space on West 29th Street formed by Walter Simonson, Howard Chaykin, Val Mayerik, and Jim Starlin. Varley colored the first two issues of Chaykin's American Flagg! Frank Miller later became part of Upstart.

Varley provided the coloring for Miller's Ronin (1984), an experimental six-issue series from DC Comics that proved that comics in unusual formats could be commercially successful; and The Dark Knight Returns (1986), a four issue mini-series that went on to become an outstanding commercial and critical success. Miller also noted that Varley helped create the futuristic slang that Carrie Kelley and other characters use.

Subsequently, Varley colored other Miller books, including The Dark Knight Strikes Again, 300, Elektra Lives Again, Big Guy and Rusty the Boy Robot (with Geoff Darrow), as well as a number of covers for the U.S. editions of the Lone Wolf and Cub series. She also colored the backgrounds for the 300 movie (2007), produced by Miller.

Varley has only worked sporadically in the comics industry since 2005.

== Personal life ==
Varley and Miller were married from 1986 to 2005. They moved from New York City to Los Angeles in the late 1980s and moved back to New York shortly before the September 11 attacks.

== Style and technique ==
Varley’s coloring technique evolved to be greatly influenced by the introduction of software programs such as Adobe Photoshop. In the early 2000s, when Varley and Miller released The Dark Knight Strikes Again, Varley's coloring included vibrant and nearly psychedelic coloring styles, vastly different from the subtler tones used in The Dark Knight Returns. Some critics argued that Varley's inexperience with the new technology negatively affected her work, and that she would have been better off using a real brush. As comics have subsequently continued to feature more vibrant color schemes, however, Varley's earlier work has also been heralded by some as ahead of its time.

== Awards ==
Varley has received recognition in the comics industry, particularly in 1999, when she won the Harvey Award, the Eisner Award, and the Comics Buyer's Guide Awards for Favorite Colorist. (She also won the CBG award in 1986 and 2000.)

== Bibliography ==
=== With Frank Miller ===
- Wolverine #4 (Marvel, 1982)
- Daredevil #191 (Marvel, 1983)
- Ronin (DC Comics, 1983-1984)
- Superman #400 [4 pages] (DC Comics, 1984)
- Marvel Fanfare #18 (Marvel, 1985)
- Batman: The Dark Knight Returns (DC Comics, 1986)
- Elektra Lives Again (Marvel, 1990)
- Martha Washington Stranded In Space [2 pages] (Dark Horse, 1995)
- 300 (Dark Horse, 1998)
- Sin City: Hell and Back #7 (Dark Horse, 2000)
- Batman: The Dark Knight Strikes Again (DC Comics, 2001-2002)

=== With other artists ===
- Marvel Super Special #21 "Conan the Barbarian" (Marvel, 1982)
- Batman Annual #8 (DC Comics, 1982)
- Sabre #2 ["Zealot's Lake" story] (Eclipse, 1982)
- The Uncanny X-Men #165 (Marvel, 1983)
- World's Finest Comics #287 (DC Comics, 1983)
- American Flagg! #1-2 (First Comics, 1983)
- Thriller #5 (DC Comics, 1984)
- Jon Sable, Freelance #34 (First Comics, 1986)
- Moebius #6 ["White Nightmare" story] (Marvel, 1988)

=== Covers ===
- Eclipse, the Magazine #8 (Eclipse, 1983)
- Batman and the Outsiders #17 (DC Comics, 1985)
- Amazing Heroes #69 (Fantagraphics, 1985)
- Anything Goes! #2 (Fantagraphics, 1986)
- Wolverine TPB (Marvel, 1987)
- Lone Wolf and Cub #1-9, 11-12 (First Comics, 1987-1988)
- Dark Horse Presents Fifth Anniversary Special (Dark Horse, 1991)
- Dark Horse Presents #55, 59-62, 100/1, 100/3, 114 (Dark Horse, 1991-1992, 1995-1996)
- Sin City: The Big Fat Kill #1-5, TPB (Dark Horse, 1994-1995)
- San Diego Comic Con Comics #4 (Dark Horse, 1995)
- Sin City: Silent Night (Dark Horse, 1995)
- The Big Guy and Rusty the Boy Robot #1-2, TPB (Dark Horse, 1995-1996)
- Sin City: That Yellow Bastard #1-6, TPB (Dark Horse, 1996-1997)
- A Decade of Dark Horse #1 (Dark Horse, 1996)
- Batman: The Dark Knight Returns - 10th Anniversary Edition (DC Comics, 1997)
- Sin City: Family Values (Dark Horse, 1997)
- Sin City: Hell and Back #1-9, TPB (Dark Horse, 1999-2000)
- Dark Horse Maverick 2000 (Dark Horse, 2000)
- Supergirl Archives #1 (DC Comics, 2001)
- Dark Horse Maverick: Happy Endings (Dark Horse, 2002)
