= Carrie Kelley =

- Carrie Kelley taken from the cover of Batman: The Dark Knight Returns #3 (May 1986). Art by Frank Miller.

Publication information
- Publisher: DC Comics
- First appearance: The Dark Knight Returns (1986)
- Created by: Frank Miller

In-story information
- Alter ego: Caroline Keene "Carrie" Kelley
- Species: Human
- Team affiliations: Justice League
- Partnerships: Batman; Green Arrow
- Notable aliases: Robin, Catgirl, Batgirl, Batwoman
- Abilities: Skilled acrobat; Skilled hand-to-hand combatant; Utilizes high-tech equipment and weapons

Caroline Keene "Carrie" Kelley is a superheroine from Frank Miller's Dark Knight trilogy of Batman graphic novels (1986–2017). She becomes the new Robin in The Dark Knight Returns (1986) when she saves Batman's life. Later in The Dark Knight Strikes Again (2001–2002), she adopts the identity Catgirl, and in The Dark Knight III: The Master Race (2015–2017), she adopts the identity Batwoman.

Kelley was the first full-time female Robin in the history of the Batman franchise, though Julie Madison had passed off as Robin for a brief time in a Bob Kane story published in Detective Comics #49 in March 1941; because Miller's Dark Knight trilogy is not part of the main DC canon, Stephanie Brown became the first mainline female Robin in the early 2000s instead. Kelley has been featured in different forms of media in and out of comics, and made her live-action debut in the television series Gotham Knights, portrayed by Navia Robinson.

== Publication history ==
According to Frank Miller, the idea to create Carrie Kelley was sparked by a conversation with superhero comics veteran John Byrne while they were flying to an Ohio comic convention. When Miller told Byrne he was writing a Batman story featuring an old and crankier Batman, Byrne recommended he make Robin a girl and drew him a sketch. Miller liked the concept so much that he ultimately included it in The Dark Knight Returns.

== Fictional character biography ==
=== The Dark Knight Returns ===
Carrie Kelley is a 13-year-old schoolgirl and scout whom Batman saves from the Mutants on the night of his return from retirement. Idolizing Batman, Kelley spends her lunch money on a Robin outfit, sets out to attack petty con men, and finds Batman in the hope of becoming his partner. Kelley uses a slingshot and firecrackers as weapons. Before she begins her training with Batman, she is already trained in gymnastics. Like most of the young characters in the book, she speaks in a futuristic slang that Miller credited his wife Lynn Varley with helping to create.

Batman accepts Kelley as Robin when she saves his life just as he is on the verge of being killed by the Mutant leader by jumping on him from behind and tearing at his eyes. She practically drags him back to the Batmobile and makes a sling for his arm out of part of her cape and a piece of pipe. Batman often threatens to fire Kelley, but she shows considerable ability and improvisation which impresses him enough to give her a stay of dismissal even when she disobeys his orders. The police, now led by Commissioner Ellen Yindel following James Gordon's retirement, oppose Batman's methods and intend to arrest him.

As Robin, Kelley plays a crucial part in tracking down and confronting the Joker. While Batman goes after Joker, Kelley manages to dispose of a bomb, but gets into a tangle with Fat Abner, Joker's accomplice. As they fight, Abner is decapitated by an overhanging section of the track, driving Kelley momentarily into shock and tears, but recovering enough to rescue a seriously injured Batman from capture by the police. Kelley, along with Batman and the Sons of Batman, helps restore order in Gotham after a nationwide blackout caused by an electromagnetic pulse. Unnerved by Batman's activities, the United States government sends Superman to bring him down. Using a variety of powerful weapons, including synthesized kryptonite, Batman manages to defeat Superman, but is apparently killed in the process. In actuality, Batman faked his death, with Kelley recovering him from his grave.

=== The Dark Knight Strikes Again ===
Carrie Kelley as Catgirl.

Three years later, Kelley has begun calling herself "Catgirl". She remains Batman's able second-in-command. She wears a skin-tight cat costume with a leopard pattern and is now trained extensively in combat. Her equipment includes motorized rollerskates and an arm cannon that fires batarangs. Catgirl's main duty is to oversee an army of Batboys to help save the world from a police-state dictatorship, led by Lex Luthor and Brainiac. However, she also causes serious injury to a Batboy who exceeded her orders by maiming and killing a couple of police officers. She beats him up and tells the others to treat him but not bother with anesthetic. Once alone, however, she breaks down in tears but is offered a comforting hand by Batman.

Kelley eventually comes into conflict with a supernatural man resembling Joker, who is revealed to be Dick Grayson having resented her because he had been shoddily treated and dumped by Batman. Her lips are badly lacerated and several of her bones are broken in the fight. Thinking that she is about to die, Kelley tells Batman that she loves him, with Batman later reflecting that he feels the same.

=== The Dark Knight III: The Master Race ===
Three years after being missing, Batman makes some appearances in Gotham for the first time. After a confrontation with the GCPD and Commissioner Yindel, Batman is apprehended and unmasked as Kelley. Kelley and Bruce Wayne see the news on the Kandorians, led by Quar, giving mankind three days to surrender to their demands and accept them as gods. Bruce and Kelley go to the Fortress of Solitude and wake Superman, who has been sitting and covered by ice for three years. Kelley reunites with the Bat Boys Army while Batman and Superman defy Quar. After being defeated by Lara, Superman is encased in black matter by Quar, who turns to Gotham and demands they hand over Batman to them or face obliteration. Bruce presents Kelley, as a "graduation present", a green and purple Batgirl outfit and sends her on a mission to engage Aquaman’s help to find and free Superman.

After the Kryptonians are defeated, Kelley is attacked by Baal and disfigures his face using a slingshot and kryptonite. Lara confronts Kelley and it's about to kill her when Diana stops her. Kelley witnesses the fight between Diana and Lara, impressed by the power both of them show. Later, Batgirl finds out that Batman was killed by Quar before escaping. Batman is resurrected after being immersed in a Lazarus Pit.

While following a lead on a crime, Commissioner Yindel is captured by Bruno and the Jokers. She is saved by Batman and Batgirl. They then head to the desert where the Kryptonians are joining forces again and use a band of bats to confuse them, causing them to disparately attack themselves, the rest are eliminated by the four remaining Quar's children. Superman, Batman, and Batgirl then attack them but they go nuclear and are about to explode when the Atom appears and reduces them in size so the explosions are insignificant.

Two months later, as Batman continues to determine Superman's fate, Kelley returns with a new suit of her own design. Declaring that she has too much experience to go back to being Batman's apprentice, she instead becomes his partner as Batwoman.

=== The New 52 ===
In September 2011, The New 52 rebooted DC's continuity. On Prime Earth, Carrie Kelley makes her first appearance in Batman and Robin #19 (titled Batman and Red Robin). She is a college student and Damian Wayne's acting instructor. As a homage to The Dark Knight Returns, she wears a Robin costume as a Halloween costume on her first appearance.

=== DC Rebirth ===
In 2016, DC Comics implemented another relaunch of its books called "DC Rebirth" which restored its continuity to a form much as it was before "The New 52". Carrie Kelley appears in a possible future where Bruce Wayne chose to retire as Batman for a chance to spend the rest of his life with Catwoman. Kelley, who is implied to have succeeded him as Gotham's protector, is shown with an elderly Selina as Bruce dies.

== Other versions ==
Carrie Kelley appears in Ame-Comi Girls. This version is Barbara Gordon's cousin and sidekick.

== In other media ==
=== Television ===
- Carrie Kelley appears in The New Batman Adventures episode "Legends of the Dark Knight", voiced by Anndi McAfee. This version is a contemporary young girl who envisions Batman in a manner akin to his depiction in The Dark Knight Returns.
- Carrie Kelley / Robin appears in the Teen Titans Go! episode "The Best Robin", voiced by Scott Menville. This version is a member of a team of Robins.
- Carrie Kelley appears in a photograph in the Titans episode "Barbara Gordon" as one of Bruce Wayne's potential candidates for a new Robin after the Joker's killing of Jason Todd.
- Carrie Kelley / Robin appears in Gotham Knights, portrayed by Navia Robinson. This version is a contemporary classmate of Bruce Wayne's adoptive son Turner Hayes whose mother Lisa Kelley (portrayed by Angela Davis) works as a doctor.
- Carrie Kelley appears in the Batman: Caped Crusader, voiced by Juliet Donenfeld. This version is a contemporary orphan who was initially under Leslie Thompkins' care. In the second season, she is adopted by an African-American couple and becomes the Crime Smasher, an amateur detective and vigilante in a Gray Ghost costume inspired by Batman's heroism.

=== Film ===
- Carrie Kelley / Robin appears in Batman: The Dark Knight Returns, voiced by Ariel Winter.
- Carrie Kelley / Robin's design serves as inspiration for The Lego Batman Movie's incarnation of Dick Grayson / Robin.

=== Video games ===
Carrie Kelly / Robin appears as a character summon in Scribblenauts Unmasked: A DC Comics Adventure.

=== Miscellaneous ===
- Carrie Kelley / Robin appears in Comics Collector #8 (Krause Publications, Summer 1985), predating her first comic book appearance.
- Carrie Kelley appears in The Batman & Robin Adventures #6.
- Carrie Kelley / Robin appears in Batman: The Brave and the Bold #13.
