= The Dark Knight III: The Master Race =

2015–2017 comic book limited series co-written by Frank Miller and Brian Azzarello

- Deluxe edition cover. Art by Andy Kubert and Klaus Janson.

Publication information
- Publisher: DC Comics
- Schedule: Bi-Monthly
- Format: Limited series
- Genre: Superhero
- Publication date: November 2015 – June 2017
- No. of issues: 9
- Main character: Batman

Creative team
- Written by: Frank Miller; Brian Azzarello
- Artists: Frank Miller; Andy Kubert; Klaus Janson

The Dark Knight III: The Master Race, also stylized as DK III: The Master Race and later collected as Batman: The Dark Knight – Master Race, is a 2015–2017 nine-issue DC Comics limited series co-written by Frank Miller and Brian Azzarello and illustrated by Miller, Andy Kubert, and Klaus Janson.

The series is a sequel to Miller's 1986 Batman miniseries The Dark Knight Returns and the 2001 miniseries The Dark Knight Strikes Again, continuing the story of an aged Bruce Wayne resuming his identity as a crimefighter, aided by his sidekick Carrie Kelley (Robin) and featuring an ensemble of DC Universe characters including Superman, Green Lantern, and Wonder Woman. In DK III, Ray Palmer restores 1,000 of the inhabitants of Kandor to full-size, but they immediately begin to terrorize the Earth. Batman sets out to assemble his former allies against the invaders.

The series is accompanied by a series of one-shots that fill in events between issues. All but the first are written and drawn by Frank Miller, which continues his experimentation with noir-style writing and art style.

== Publication history ==
On April 24, 2015, DC Comics announced that Frank Miller was co-writing a sequel to The Dark Knight Strikes Again with Brian Azzarello titled The Dark Knight III: The Master Race and that it would be an eight-issue limited series and would be the third installment in a trilogy that began with The Dark Knight Returns. The series, however, ultimately had a ninth issue that was published on June 7, 2017.

Andy Kubert and Klaus Janson provide art for the main story while the tie-in stories are illustrated by a rotating team of artists including Frank Miller himself, John Romita Jr. and Eduardo Risso. Numerous guest artists have contributed variant covers for each issue including some limited print variants that were exclusive to specific book shops like Ssalefish Comics.

== Plot ==
=== Issue #1 ===
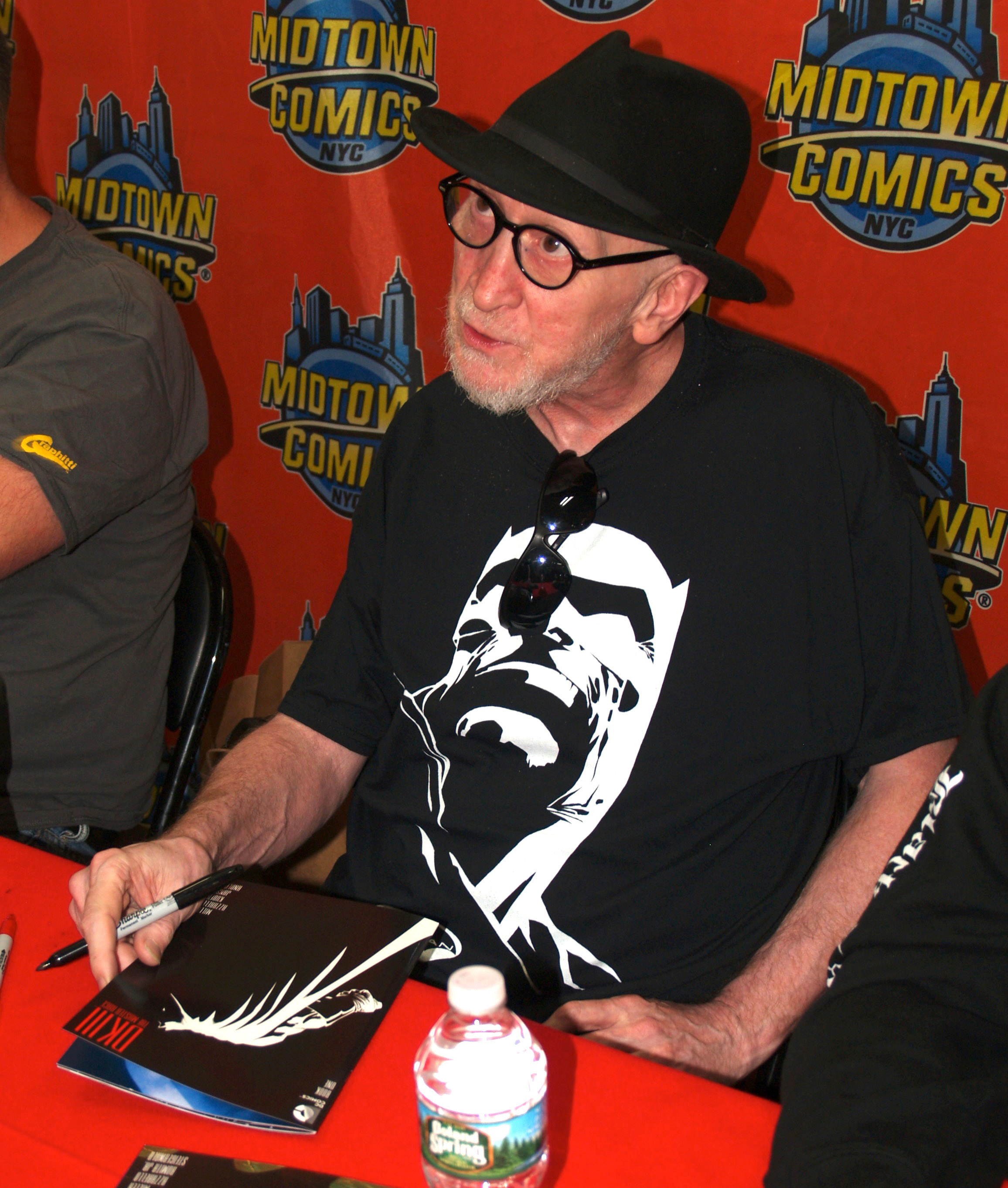
Frank Miller signing a copy of the book during an appearance at Midtown Comics

Three years have passed following the deaths of Lex Luthor and Dick Grayson/the "Joker". Bruce Wayne has not been seen since. In the Batcave, someone unseen shatters a display case and removes the Batsuit from therein.

On the streets, a suspect is chased by Gotham City police officers but saved when Batman appears to attack their pursuit vehicles.

In a jungle setting, Wonder Woman battles a four-legged minotaur while her infant super-son, Johnathan, rides in a papoose on her back. Upon returning to the Amazons' new city, she learns that her truant daughter Lara is visiting Superman, father to her and consort to Diana.

Superman is now mysteriously iced over, seated on a throne in his rebuilt Fortress of Solitude. Lara speaks to him absently about the Kryptonian relics on display, including the bottled city of Kandor. Upon looking closely at it, she discovers a distress signal.

Back in Gotham, Commissioner Ellen Yindel ponders the derelict Bat-Signal. Her career is mired by the media frenzy surrounding the Batman sightings and a new mayoral spokesperson trying to put words in her mouth. She answers a call reporting Batman's imminent arrest.

The ensuing chase results in Batman surrounded and abandoning a motorcycle. After considerable resistance, the cops manage to beat Batman down with night sticks. Disregarding the surprise of a female Batman, Yindel joins the arrest, unmasks her, and demands the whereabouts of Bruce Wayne. Revealed, Carrie Kelley claims the original Batman is dead.

==== First tie-in ====
Dark Knight Universe Presents: The Atom #1: Dr. Ray Palmer finishes a sparring session with a reptile specimen in his lab. He regrows to normal human size and reads news cards about the Kelly arrest, worrying about the implications. The sounds of intruders prompt him to arm himself. One, he finds, is a miniaturized man we will come to know as Baal. The other is Lara who has come calling to see if Palmer can restore the inhabitants of Kandor to full size.

=== Issue #2 ===
The beaten and bloodied Carrie Kelley is manhandled into a police vehicle. When prompted, she madly repeats her claim that "Bruce Wayne is dead" three times. She is incarcerated as a Jane Doe and Commissioner Yindel spends a month interrogating her, with mixed success. Carrie claims the aging Bruce Wayne finally succumbed to battle injuries after years of holding on. But when asked about his final resting place, Carrie only makes a sick joke and chides Yindel about her anti-Batman beliefs.

Back at his laboratory, Ray Palmer fills in Lara about the horrible consequences of his earlier attempts to resize Kandor. Baal joins the conversation through a wall-mounted speaker. Lara super-hears a summons from her mother and flies away in the blink of an eye. Baal and Ray continue talking, leaving off with Baal frowning when Ray makes a reference to God.

Following some media commentary, Yindel takes reports on the lack of protesters or resistance to Carrie's legal situation, implying that the Mayor is manipulating opinions. Yindel remotely oversees Carrie's prison transport. At a strategic point en route, Carrie whistles to trigger a non-lethal missile strike on the transport. The Batmobile advances on the transport. A waiting force of squad cars and drones scrambles to surround the Batmobile. As it continues to shoot police vehicles, Yindel orders a drawbridge raised to cut off its escape route. Police corner the Batmobile against the drawbridge, but find no one inside. Its afterburner fires, propelling it over the drawbridge. Carrie, who has wedged herself in the undercarriage, escapes when the Batmobile lands on the other side of the river.

In a desert, Ray attempts his Kandor restoration project involving cables connected to the bottle and a chest-mounted beam projector. After a blinding flash, the area is populated by full-sized Kandor citizens. However, Ray is shocked to see that some of their number are freshly dead and many more wear the raiments of a cult soon revealed to be twisted, fanatical, and polygamous. The regrown Baal introduces their leader as Quar. Quar redirects the beam on Palmer. Palmer shrinks to a tiny height and Baal steps on him. Quar orates about their new home and power. He picks up the bottle city, whose inhabitants no longer include any of his followers, and obliterates it with heat vision.

In the Batcave, Carrie disembarks from the Batmobile and approaches the Batcomputer terminal. Bruce Wayne stands there with a crutch and turns to look at her with an unreadable expression.

==== Second tie-in ====
Dark Knight Universe Presents: Wonder Woman #1: Super mother/daughter friction occurs as Lara returns to the new Amazon city, late for a sparring session with Wonder Woman. Lara laments her upbringing in secret near-isolation while Diana focuses on the upside of having a defiant daughter; she will fight for her own in life. Lara complains that combat training is needless, given her potentially unrivaled superpowers. Diana attacks harder in an effort to enliven Lara's performance. All the while, super baby Johnathan remains in the papoose, possibly not even awake. Diana speaks of her fighting Amazonian heritage and thrusts a sword at Lara. Lara allows the sword to break on her chest, counters that she prefers her father's heritage, and flies away.

=== Issue #3 ===
Now released from Kandor, the Kryptonians led by Quar make an announcement to the world, asking that they be acknowledged as gods or face destruction. Faced with this ultimatum, but recognising that he is too weak to face such a threat himself, Bruce takes Carrie to the Fortress of Solitude to inspire Superman back into action, who since The Dark Knight Strikes Again has left himself to freeze in the Fortress. When they reach the Fortress, Bruce strikes Clark with a sledgehammer to rouse him. Clark awakens to Carrie saying that Kryptonians are involved. While Superman agrees to help, Quar and his followers breach the Pentagon, demanding an answer to their ultimatum. The monitors around the room go black and Bruce declares: "Go to Hell". At that moment, Superman arrives, but is shocked to see his daughter Lara now aiding Quar, declaring him a traitor to his own race.

==== Third tie-in ====
Dark Knight Universe Presents: Green Lantern #1 - Hal Jordan: Learning of the Kryptonians' arrival on Earth, Hal travels back to try to make them stand down. Encountering the three wives of Quar in Egypt, Hal is toyed with by the women as they assess his Green Lantern powers and, realising that without his Ring he is no threat, they sever his right hand (and the Ring) with their heat vision, casting it into the atmosphere, and leaving Hal wounded and in shock in the dirt by the shadow of the Sphinx.

=== Issue #4 ===
Superman stands his ground, but refuses to fight back as Lara pummels him all across the world to the Fortress of Solitude. Quar cocoons Superman in black matter and orders his legion of Kryptonians to sink the Fortress into the ocean, and Superman with it. He then gives out an order to Gotham City demanding that they hand over the Batman or they will take it out on Gotham. As the city falls into chaos, Bruce orders Carrie on a special mission, giving her some sort of pill and her new Batgirl costume. Wonder Woman, meanwhile, stands alone on Themyscira in the rain, ignoring the call to action from Bruce. As Ellen Yindel waxes on the worth of the people of Gotham and that of the GCPD, Bruce in his Batman garb appears behind her and tells her to stop trying to drown out the needs of her people.

Meanwhile, Ray Palmer, revealed to still be alive, is sinking into a subatomic universe when he suddenly grabs hold of an atom, realizing that he might be able to fix his mistake. The Flash is on his way to Gotham City at super-speed but is intercepted by one of Quar's followers who breaks both his legs.

==== Fourth tie-in ====
Dark Knight Universe Presents: Batgirl #1: In the middle of the riots in Gotham City, Carrie Kelly fights her way to the Gotham piers wearing her new Batgirl costume. She casts a pill given to her by Bruce into the bay as she is about to be overtaken. At that moment Aquaman reaches out from the water and grabs the item she had thrown in, riding on the back of a whale. Carrie jumps on top next to Aquaman and he tells her to hold her breath as he holds her close.

=== Issue #5 ===
With Gotham City under attack, Batman's followers bring Flash to the Batcave, but Batman is worried he cannot fix the Flash's broken legs. Meanwhile, Carrie Kelly, Aquaman and his army have found Superman in the Arctic. Carrie Kelly frees Superman from the matter he is trapped in using a golden needle given to her by Batman. Back in Gotham, Batman prepares to fight Quar and his legions. Superman brings Carrie back to the Batcave, where the Flash is now attached to a computer to interfere with the weather. Using power from the Bat-Signal, the Flash makes it rain synthetic kryptonite, weakening the Kryptonians and causing them to fall from the sky by the hundreds. Batman, Superman (clad in kryptonite-resistant armor), and the people of Gotham bring the fight to them.

==== Fifth tie-in ====
Dark Knight Universe Presents: Lara #1: Lara begins to connect with Baal, who tries to impress her by having his version of "fun" and impressing upon her that it is not wrong to have a lot of it. Baal picks up a car and uses it to make sexual advances towards her. Near the end, they engage in a kiss and Lara begins her journey of love.

=== Issue #6 ===
Thanks to the synthetic kryptonite, Batman, Superman, the GCPD and the citizens of Gotham are able to hold off the Kryptonians. The weakened Quar is held off by the Sons of Batman, who hit him with a barrage of bullets and an RPG. Lara and Baal return from their outing around the world after the kryptonite rain has fallen and are surprised to see the situation with the downed Kryptonians. Baal begins to kill the citizens and burns a squadron of Batboys to death with his heat vision. Carrie attacks Baal with the Batmobile, which he destroys. Baal grabs Carrie by the cape and hurls her through the air. Miraculously, she is able to land unharmed. When she is cornered by Baal, Carrie uses her slingshot and shoots him in the eye with a kryptonite pebble. Baal retreats, screaming in pain. As the Kryptonians retreat, Superman suggests pursuing them to destroy them once and for all, but Batman persuades him to let them go and so they can "lick their wounds". Quar uses his heat vision and hits Batman in the back, burning a hole through his chest. After he collapses, Superman removes Batman's helmet. Bruce makes Clark promise not to take him to a hospital and seemingly dies.

==== Sixth tie-in ====
Dark Knight Universe Presents: World's Finest #1: Carrie Kelly and two members of the Sons of Batman watch over Gotham City. Lara Kent appears and confronts them. Lara asks Carrie if she was the Batman's "Chosen One". Carrie responds with a punch, but fractures her right hand. Wonder Woman arrives to confront Lara and the two fight until she subdues Lara. Realizing that her daughter is injured, she offers her hand and tries to persuade Lara that she is still her daughter after all, but an emotional Lara declines and leaves the scene.

=== Issue #7 ===
The story continues with the GCPD led by Ellen Yindel and Carrie Kelly cleaning up the city. Yindel asks Carrie if what they fought for was worth it, since a lot of people died during the battle. Carrie responds by telling Yindel to fix the Bat-Signal so they can keep in touch. Meanwhile, the Kryptonians were able to regain their strength and Quar persuaded Lara Kent to capture her brother, Jonathan Kent, as their hostage. At Themyscira, Wonder Woman was able to sense the planned siege when she confronted Lara, who was attempting to kidnap Jonathan Kent. The Kryptonians realized that the Amazonians were just waiting for them, ready to attack. Meanwhile, the unknown location Superman went into is revealed to be the Lazarus Pit. Superman plunges Batman's body into the pit and Bruce Wayne comes out alive, physically younger, and in his prime once again. Bruce attacks Superman due to the effects of the pit, but Superman calms him down at the end.

==== Seventh tie-in ====
Dark Knight Universe Presents: Strange Adventures #1: Hal Jordan continues to search for his lost hand with the Green Lantern Power Ring attached to it. Meanwhile, Hawkman and Hawkgirl watch over him, deliberating over helping him. Hal reaches an unknown village in the middle of the desert and finds the Power Ring in possession of one of the men in the village with the help of a beggar to whom he gave his drinking water at the village's entrance. The man tries to sell the Ring but Hal, without any money, steals the Ring and runs. Pursued by armed goons, Hal is cornered and surrounded, but is saved by Hawkman and Hawkgirl. At the story's end, Hal is reunited with his severed hand and becomes Green Lantern again.

=== Issue #8 ===
At the Batcave, Carrie and the Flash deal with Batman's death, with Carrie hopeful that Bruce is still alive. Batman, now rejuvenated by the Lazarus Pit, appears with Superman. They receive a transmission from Wonder Woman in Themyscira seeking assistance, as the Kryptonians have declared war against the Amazons. Superman arrives to check on Diana, but the Flash warns Wonder Woman and Superman that Quar and the remaining Kryptonians, who ingested nuclear bombs, are all in one location and have started a countdown.

==== Eighth tie-in ====
Dark Knight Universe Presents: Detective Comics #1: Ellen Yindel, together with two members of the GCPD SWAT team, are investigating an area where they got a lead from a victim that claims to be still alive. They find mutilated body parts treated as a trophy and are attacked by former members of the mutants that are dressed up like the Joker, calling themselves the Joker Boys. The SWAT team members are killed and Yindel is beaten up. It turns out that Bruno has taken over the group, and she called in the police to be able to kill Yindel herself. The Joker Boys are about to slice Yindel on a table, but Batman and Batgirl arrived to save her. Bruno and Yindel are caught up in a struggle and both sustain gunshot wounds. With Yindel about to lose consciousness, it is made clear that she is about to accept that Batman will always be there to protect Gotham, no matter what.

=== Issue #9 ===
Batman and Carrie race to the Kryptonians, who continue the countdown. During this, Batman manages to swarm them with bats, causing them to inadvertently attack one another. Discouraged, most of the Kryptonians attempt to leave Earth, only to be killed by Quar. Batman and Carrie attempt to attack, but are stopped by Superman, who goes in their stead. After being berated and assaulted by the remaining Kryptonians, Superman surprises them by systematically taking them out, revealing to Batman that Superman had been holding back his true fighting ability all this time. Defeated, the Kryptonians attempt to go nuclear, revealing that they are planted on a fault line which will rip the planet apart. However, Ray Palmer manages to fix and reverse the effects of his shrinking ray, causing him to grow and most of the remaining Kryptonians to shrink, negating their explosives' effects to nothing more than mere firecrackers. Quar, going nuclear as well, attempts to run, but he is taken by Lara and sent to the Sun, where he detonates.

Two months later, Superman seemingly has disappeared. Batman comes to grips with his extended life. Carrie has altered her Batsuit to mimic Batman's and rechristens herself "Batwoman". Batman grows to accept her as an equal as opposed to a sidekick. It is also revealed that Lara survived the encounter with Quar.

==== Ninth tie-in ====
Dark Knight Universe Presents: Action Comics #1: While Batman, Batwoman, Aquaman, Green Lantern, Wonder Woman, the Flash, and the Atom all continue their duties to fight crime and protect humanity, Superman, under his guise as Clark Kent, begins to teach Lara what it means to be human.

== Reception ==
The Dark Knight III: The Master Race received mixed to positive reviews. The first issue of the miniseries was the bestselling comic in the month of November, selling 440,234 copies.

== Sequel ==
DK III was initially advertised as the conclusion to the Dark Knight series that began with The Dark Knight Returns, but in November 2015 Frank Miller announced he planned to produce a fourth miniseries to conclude the story. "I thoroughly applaud what [Brian Azzarello] [is] doing ... But now that he's doing [DK III], it's now a four-part series. I'm doing the fourth."

Frank Miller released the name of the fourth chapter of the series, a Prestige Format one-shot entitled Dark Knight Returns: The Golden Child, released under the DC Black Label logo. The one-shot by Miller and Rafael Grampa was released December 2019.

== Collected editions ==
Title	Material collected	Published date	ISBN
Batman: The Dark Knight III - The Master Race	The Dark Knight III: The Master Race #1-9, Dark Knight Universe Presents: The Atom #1, Wonder Woman #1, Green Lantern #1, Batgirl #1, Lara #1, Worlds Finest #1, Strange Adventures #1, Detective Comics #1, Action Comics #1	September 2017	978-1401265137
Absolute Batman: The Dark Knight III - The Master Race	The Dark Knight III: The Master Race #1-9, Dark Knight Universe Presents: The Atom #1, Wonder Woman #1, Green Lantern #1, Batgirl #1, Lara #1, Worlds Finest #1, Strange Adventures #1, Detective Comics #1, Action Comics #1	December 2019	978-1401299620
Batman: The Dark Knight III - The Master Race: The Covers Deluxe Edition	Covers from every issue of The Dark Knight III: The Master Race and its nine tie-in issues	September 2017	978-1401267384
