= Elektra Lives Again =

1990 book by Frank Miller

- Date: March 1990
- Main characters: Elektra; Matt Murdock
- Page count: 96 pages
- Publisher: Marvel Comics

Creative team
- Writers: Frank Miller
- Artists: Frank Miller
- Letterers: Jim Novak
- Colourists: Lynn Varley
- Creators: Frank Miller; Lynn Varley
- Editors: Margaret Clark; Ralph Macchio; Al Milgrom
- ISBN: 093621127X

Elektra Lives Again is a 1990 graphic novel by Frank Miller and Lynn Varley, published through American company Marvel Comics' imprint Epic Comics. It is a spin-off from Miller's run on Daredevil and tells the story of the apparent return of ninja warrior Elektra from death.

== Plot ==
Monday, April 1: Matt Murdock attends confession, telling the priest that he is still haunted by the death of Elektra. He describes a recurring dream of Elektra climbing a snow-covered mountain. In the dream, Elektra is horrified to come upon her sais buried in the snow: "the weapons she used to murder so many". She also suddenly notices that her hands are covered in blood which she cannot wash away.

Tuesday, April 2: Murdock dreams again. This time Elektra is pursued across the mountain peak by the revenants of her former victims, who catch her and torture her. Murdock wakes, but slips back into another dream, this time of an occult ritual involving The Hand. Still in the dream state, he receives cryptic information that Elektra is alive, but that plans are afoot to kill her (again). These plans are described as finding "the one" who killed Elektra previously (i.e. Bullseye) and making him "mighty".

Saturday, April 6: Seeking company and distraction, Murdock telephones Karen Page, but she tells him she is busy in Los Angeles making "educational films". Murdock is troubled by the way she sounds, but she cuts him off.

Sunday, April 7: Murdock visits the cemetery location of Elektra's grave, and lays orchids.

Monday, April 8: Murdock meets with a female client to discuss her acrimonious divorce case. They end up having a one-night stand, but Murdock remains distracted by Elektra. He dreams of visiting her grave in an empty, snowy landscape, where he is set upon by ninjas. Elektra arrives to rescue him. She kills the ninjas, but in the aftermath stares at Murdock angrily, and strikes him with a poisoned shuriken.

Tuesday, April 9: Murdock resolves to act on his dreams, however crazy that may seem, and try to speak to Bullseye himself. Before he even leaves his apartment, however, he receives a phone call from Foggy Nelson informing him that Bullseye has been murdered in prison. Nelson and Murdock are to act as legal representation for Bullseye's killer.

Wednesday, April 10: Murdock identifies Bullseye's body in the morgue, and then proceeds to the police precinct where he meets with Bullseye's Japanese assassin. They engage in a psychic battle which leaves Murdock unconscious and the assassin dead from a brain haemorrhage. Meanwhile, Elektra gains access to the morgue. She approaches Bullseye's body with a large blade, but before she can act, she is attacked by reanimated corpses, only narrowly escaping in an explosion that burns off her clothes. Naked, she walks past Murdock. He grabs her wrist as she passes, and they make love, but Murdock notes that she is cold. He regains consciousness, even less sure than before of the line between his dreams and reality. He returns home and works out with a punching bag, but soon becomes aware of sounds revealing an attacker is nearby. A ninja bursts in and the two fight, until the intruder is suddenly killed by an arrow fired into the apartment from outside by a shadowy figure. Murdock chases this second figure across the rooftops to a church, where The Hand have Bullseye's body and are in the process of a resurrection ritual. Elektra is already there, dressed in the white robes of a nun, but she is too late to stop the process. Murdock arrives to find her mortally wounded, apparently by Bullseye. Murdock and the ailing Elektra together eventually manage to kill Bullseye (again) after a brutal battle, but Elektra then dies (again) in Murdock's arms. Murdock recalls the priest at the confessional telling him that he wasn't being haunted by Elektra, but was in fact haunting her. He burns the church with her body inside ("even from across the street [the fire is] blistering"), but reflects that Elektra is nevertheless "somewhere cold". The book's final image is of Elektra once again in an empty landscape ankle-deep in snow, staring into a blue sky.

== Publication history ==
Elektra Lives Again was originally published as a hardcover edition in 1990. It has since been reprinted a number of times in trade paperbacks and hardcovers of varying sizes, and was also included in the 2008 hardcover Elektra by Frank Miller & Bill Sienkiewicz Omnibus, along with the Elektra: Assassin limited series and a number of shorter stories.

== Awards ==
- 1991 Eisner Award for Best Graphic Album: New
- 1991 UK Comic Art Award for Best Original Graphic Novel

== Cameo appearance ==
As Murdock enters the cemetery on Sunday, the French comic character Carmen Cru^{fr} can be seen leaving.
