= Katie Kubert =

American comic book editor

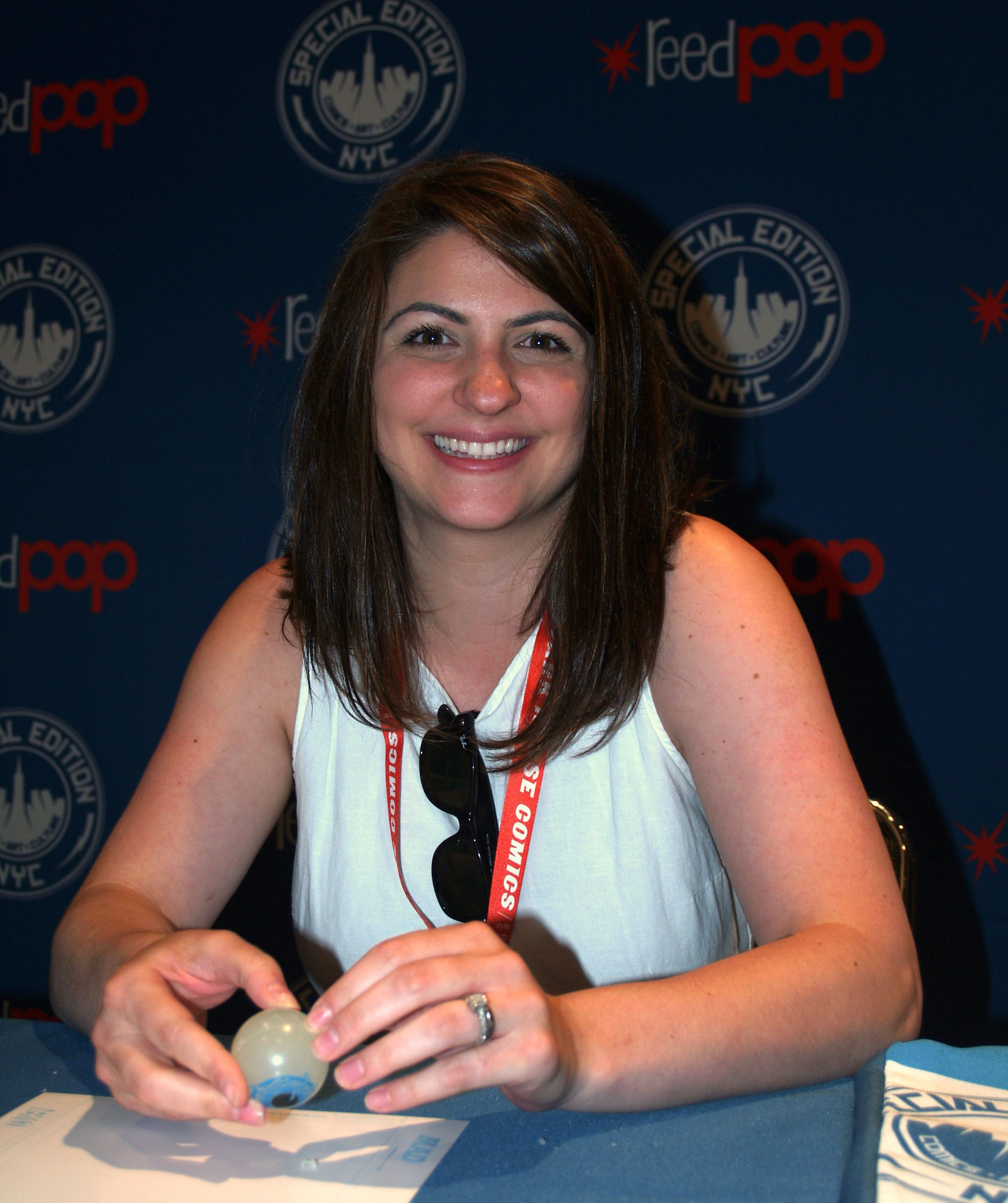
Katie Kubert at the Marvel: Next Big Thing panel on Saturday, June 14, 2014, Day 1 of the Special Edition NYC convention in Manhattan

Katie Kubert (/ˈkjuːbərt/) is an American comic book editor. She is known for her work at DC Comics, where she supervised the reinvention of the Batgirl comics.

== Early life ==
Katie Kubert graduated from Boston University in 2006 with a Bachelors of Science in Film/Cinema/Video Studies and Art History.

Kubert is the granddaughter of comic book artist Joe Kubert, as well as the niece of comic book artists Adam Kubert and Andy Kubert.

== Career ==
In 2011, Kubert began her career at DC Comics as a Pre-Press Coordinator. From there, she was promoted to an assistant editor, an associate editor, and ultimately an editor. Throughout her time at DC, she spent a significant portion of it supervising the reinvention of the Batgirl comics.

As an editor, Kubert developed the relaunch of several comics that include Harley Quinn, Grayson, and Batman Eternal. She was also featured as a character in the comic Harley Quinn Invades Comic-Con International, where she complains about her "soul sucking job". Her appearance was noted as ironic by Rich Johnston of Bleeding Cool, as her scene in the comic had been created before she had announced to DC Comics that she had taken a job at Marvel Comics.

In 2014, Kubert moved to Marvel Comics as an editor. Here she assisted in the launch of a few new series, including Gamora (2017), Hulk (2017), A-Force (2016), Squadron Supreme (2016), Nighthawk (2016), Agents of S.H.I.E.L.D. (2016), Spider-Man and the X-Men (2015), Guardians 3000 (2015), Guardians Team-Up (2015), and weekly series Wolverine (2014).

In 2017, Kubert returned to DC Comics.

== Comics ==
As editor, unless otherwise noted

- Batgirl reinvention comics (2014)
- Harley Quinn comics (2014)
- Grayson comics (2014)
- Batman Eternal weekly comics (2014)
- Wolverine comics (2014)
- Guardians Team-Up comics (2015)
- Guardians 3000 comics (2015)
- Spider-Man and the X-Men comics (2015)
- Agents of S.H.I.E.L.D. comics (2016)
- Nighthawk comics (2016)
- Squadron Supreme comics (2016)
- A-Force comics (2016)
- Gamora comics (2017)
- Hulk comics (2017)
- Sideways comics (2018)
- Absolute Batman comics (2024)
