= Mutants (DC Comics) =

Fictional street gang in the DC universe

Publication information
- Publisher: DC Comics
- First appearance: The Dark Knight Returns #1 (February 1986)
- Created by: Frank Miller

In-story information
- Member(s): See Members

The Mutants is a fictional street gang appearing in American comic books published by DC Comics. The group first appeared in the series The Dark Knight Returns, which took place in an alternate future. A version of the Mutants later appeared in the main DC continuity.

== Fictional team biography ==
=== The Dark Knight Returns ===
In The Dark Knight Returns, set in a potential future, the Mutants are a youth gang that formed sometime after Bruce Wayne retired as Batman. A decade later, Wayne becomes Batman again after crime rates spike. Although Batman defeats the Mutants, the Mutant Leader ends up goading him into a fight. Batman is able to match the Leader in strength, but is severely injured due to being out of practice. Carrie Kelley creates a diversion, allowing Batman to immobilize the Mutant Leader, and the two of them escape. The Gotham City Police Department arrive and arrest the Mutant Leader and his associates. While in police custody, the Mutant Leader is visited by the unnamed mayor of Gotham City, who wants to negotiate with him. The Mutant Leader kills the mayor by tearing out his throat, causing deputy mayor Stevenson to be sworn in as the new mayor of Gotham City. Batman manages to defeat the Mutant Leader in a rematch, causing the Mutants to disband. Some of the Mutants members form a new group called the "Sons of Batman", using excessive violence against criminals, while others splinter off into separate gangs.

=== Mainstream comics ===
In "The New 52" continuity reboot, the Mutants appear as allies of Leviathan. Later on, when Booster Gold accidentally brings Jonah Hex to the present, he finds a family being endangered by the Mutants, who Hex confronts. He manages to kill their leader King-Boss-Champion Steaktube.

== Membership ==
=== The Dark Knight Returns members ===
- Mutant Leader – The unnamed albino leader of the Mutants, a physically imposing and strong man who shaped his teeth as fangs to add to his imposing presence. He manipulated Gotham City's youth to perform violent criminal acts under his leadership, spiking to an all-time high and contributing to force Batman out of retirement.
- Don
- Rob

=== Mainstream comics members ===
- King-Boss-Champion Steaktube – A member of the Mutants. He was killed by Jonah Hex.

== In other media ==
=== Television ===
- The Mutants appear in The New Batman Adventures episode "Legends of the Dark Knight", with the Mutant Leader voiced by Kevin Michael Richardson, Don voiced by Mark Rolston, and Rob voiced by Charles Rocket.
- Two members of the Mutants make a non-speaking appearance in the Teen Titans episode "How Long is Forever?".
- The Mutants make a non-speaking cameo appearance in the Batman: The Brave and the Bold episode "The Knights of Tomorrow!".
- A variation of the Mutants appears in Gotham. This version is led by Terence "Cupcake" Shaw (portrayed by Jamar Greene) and is known to hold fight clubs across Gotham City. Another faction of Mutants appear in the fifth season, led by an unnamed leader (portrayed by Sid O'Connell).
- The Mutants appear in Gotham Knights. This version is led by Vernon Wagner (portrayed by Keil Oakley Zepernick) who has a history with Batman.

=== Film ===
- The Mutants appear in the two-part film Batman: The Dark Knight Returns, with the Mutant Leader voiced by Gary Anthony Williams, Don voiced by Dee Bradley Baker, Rob voiced by Rob Paulsen, and the Sons of Batman member voiced by Yuri Lowenthal.
- The Mutant Leader makes a non-speaking appearance in The Lego Batman Movie.
- The Mutants make a non-speaking appearance in Zack Snyder's Justice League.

=== Video games ===
The Mutant Leader appears as a non-player character (NPC) in Lego Batman: Legacy of the Dark Knight.
