= Klaus Janson =

American comics artist

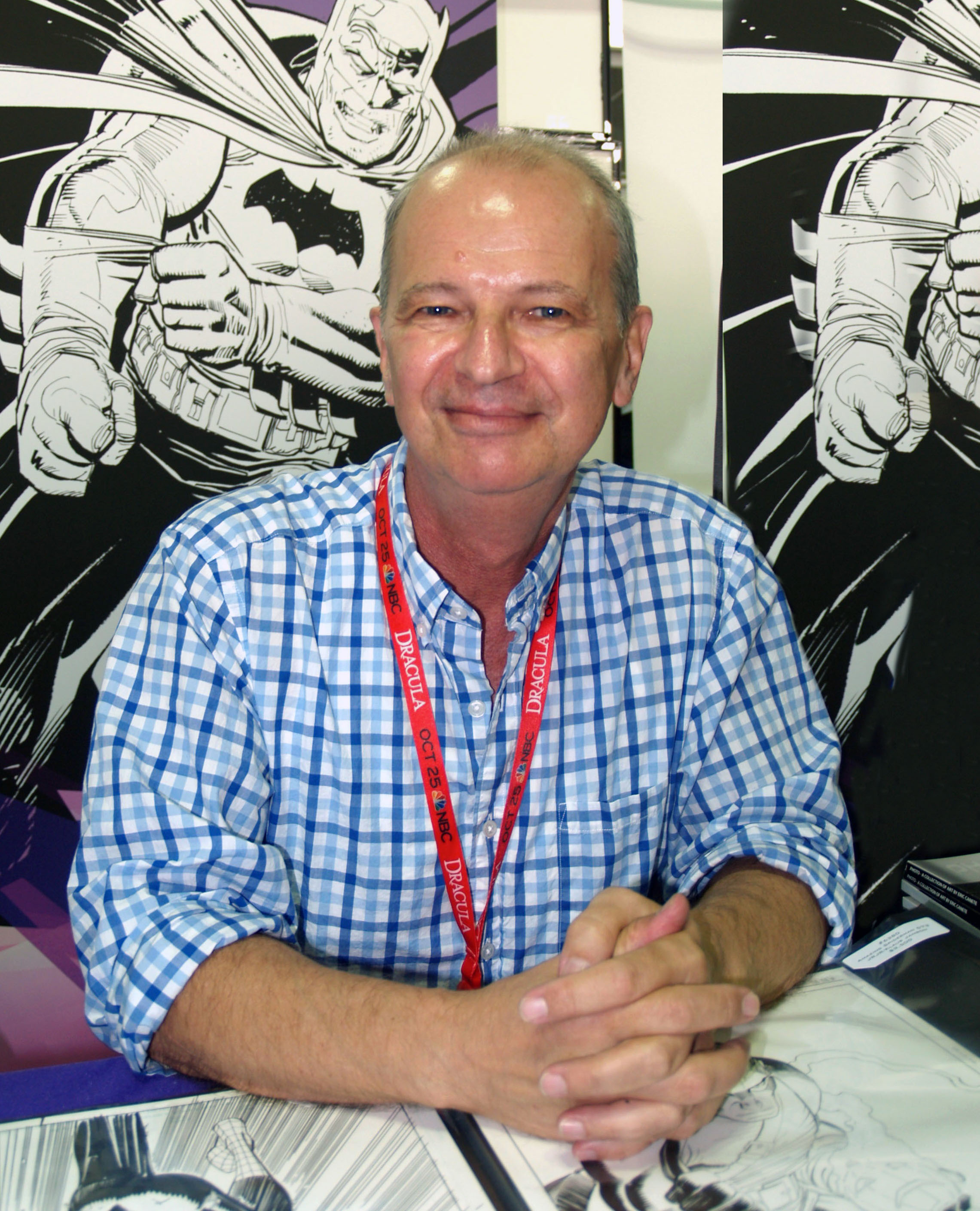
- Janson at the New York Comic Con 2013
- Born: January 23, 1952 (age 74) Coburg, West Germany
- Areas: Penciller, Inker, Colourist
- Notable works: The Dark Knight Returns; Daredevil
- Awards: Kirby Award (x2); Eisner Award, 2004; Harvey Award (x3); Inkwell Award The Joe Sinnott Hall of Fame Award (2010); Inkwell Award for Favorite Inker (2013)

Klaus Janson (born January 23, 1952) is an American comics artist, working regularly for Marvel Comics and DC Comics and sporadically for independent companies. While he is best known as an inker, Janson has frequently worked as a penciller and colorist.

== Early life ==
Klaus Janson was born in Coburg, West Germany. He emigrated to the United States in 1957, settling with his family in Connecticut, where he lived in Bridgeport from 1957 to 1972. When Janson was young, his mother threw away his Spider-Man collection. Janson then became interested in the character Daredevil, who was not popular among Janson's friends.

Janson is a gay man.

== Career ==
After a short stint as assistant to Dick Giordano in the early 1970s, Janson's first credited comics artwork was published by Marvel Comics in Jungle Action #6 (Sept. 1973). Janson came to prominence as the inker over Sal Buscema's pencils on The Defenders. Since then he has freelanced on most of the major titles at Marvel and DC. In 1975 he began a long run as inker on Daredevil, running from #124 (Aug. 1975) to #196 (July 1983). With #171 the series went from bi-monthly to monthly; unable to handle the increased workload, then-writer/penciler Frank Miller began increasingly relying on Janson for the artwork, sending him looser and looser pencils beginning with #173. By issue #185, Miller had virtually relinquished his role as Daredevil's artist, and was providing only rough layouts for Janson to pencil, ink, and color. After Miller's departure, Janson drew the series by himself for four issues.

Janson began working for DC Comics in the early 1980s and inked Gene Colan's pencils on Detective Comics and Jemm, Son of Saturn. Janson was one of the artists on Superman #400 (Oct. 1984) and was one of the contributors to the DC Challenge limited series. His collaboration with Miller on Daredevil would soon be eclipsed by a second collaboration between them, on Batman: The Dark Knight Returns in 1986. Janson has frequently pencilled and inked for various Batman titles, including the first Detective Comics Annual with writer Dennis O'Neil, "Gothic" with Grant Morrison, and "Knightfall" with Doug Moench. In 1994, Janson drew the Batman-Spawn: War Devil intercompany crossover which was written by Moench, Chuck Dixon, and Alan Grant. Janson wrote a short story in the anthology miniseries Batman: Black and White #3 (August 1996). Janson drew part of the "Cataclysm" crossover as well.

Janson and writer Mike Baron introduced the character Microchip as an ally of the Punisher in The Punisher #4 (November 1987). In 1993, Janson drew a three-part story featuring Electro for Spider-Man #38–40. Janson inked the early issues of The Sensational Spider-Man which had been written and penciled by Dan Jurgens. Janson's work as an inker and occasional penciler at Marvel Comics includes collaborations with John Romita Jr. on Wolverine, The Amazing Spider-Man and Black Panther. His other work includes Batman: Death and the Maidens, World War Hulk, Battlestar Galactica, Logan's Run, and Terminator 2: Judgment Day. In 2010, he inked Romita Jr.'s pencils on The Avengers. and in 2014 the two artists collaborated on Superman. Janson was one of the artists on The Dark Knight III: The Master Race which was co-written by Frank Miller and Brian Azzarello.

Janson has taught sequential storytelling at the School of Visual Arts in New York City since the 1990s and has written both The DC Comics Guide to Pencilling Comics and The DC Comics Guide to Inking Comics. Janson also holds annual seminars at Marvel for the editorial staff and their up-and-coming artists, and taught short courses on comics storytelling for the Museum of Comic and Cartoon Art.

In 2015, Janson was the Guest of Honor at the 2015 Inkwell Awards Awards Ceremony at HeroesCon.

On October 9, 2026, at the 38th Harvey Awards ceremony, Janson was one of a group of creators associated with Batman, who along with Frank Miller, David Mazzucchelli, Jerry Robinson, Dick Sprang and former DC Comics president and publisher Jenette Kahn, was inducted into the Harvey Awards Hall of Fame.

== Awards ==
- 1987 Kirby Award:
  - Best Art Team (with Frank Miller) for Daredevil
  - Best Single Issue for Batman: The Dark Knight Returns #1
- 1989 Golden Apple Award for Best Artist (Anglo-Saxon Comics Festival)
- 2000 Comics Buyer's Guide Fan Awards for Favorite Reprint Graphic Album for Manhunter: The Special Edition
- 2004 Eisner Award for Best Graphic Album — Reprint for The Batman Adventures: Dangerous Dames & Demons
- 2010 Harvey Award for Best Inker for The Amazing Spider-Man
- 2010 Inkwell Award The Joe Sinnott Hall of Fame Award
- 2011 Shel Dorf Awards for Inker of the Year
- 2012 Inkpot Award
- 2013 Harvey Award for Best Inker for Captain America
- 2013 Inkwell Award for Favorite Inker
- 2015 Inkwell Awards Guest of Honor
- 2016 Harvey Award for Best Inker for The Dark Knight III: The Master Race
- 2026 Inductee into the Harvey Awards Hall of Fame

== Bibliography ==
=== Image ===
- Sacred Creatures #1–8 (2018)

=== Atlas/Seaboard Comics ===
- Wulf the Barbarian #1–2 (1975)

=== DC Comics ===
- 9-11 – The World's Finest Comic Book Writers & Artists Tell Stories to Remember Volume 2 (2002)
- Action Comics #447, 800 (1975, 2003)
- The Adventures of Superman #458, 526, 539 (1989–1996)
- Atari Force #14 (1985)
- Batgirl #30 (2002)
- Batman #343–345, 348, 553–554, 80-Page Giant #1 (1982–1998)
- The Batman Adventures Annual #1 (1994)
- Batman Black and White #3 (1996)
- The Batman Chronicles #12 (1998)
- Batman: Death and the Maidens #1–9 (2003–2004)
- Batman: Gordon of Gotham #1–4 (1998)
- Batman: Gordon's Law #1–4 (1996)
- Batman: Legends of the Dark Knight #6–10 (1990)
- Batman: Shadow of the Bat #55 (1996)
- Batman-Spawn: War Devil #1 (1994)
- Batman: The 10-Cent Adventure #1 (2002)
- Batman: The Dark Knight Returns #1–4 (1986)
- Batman 3-D Graphic Novel #1 (1990, one page)
- Batman: Toyman #1 (1998)
- Big Book of Little Criminals (1996, one page)
- Convergence Batman and Robin #1–2 (2015)
- Dark Days: The Casting #1 (2017)
- Dark Days: The Forge #1 (2017)
- The Dark Knight III: The Master Race #1–9 (2016–2017)
- DC Challenge #4 (1986)
- DC Comics Presents #82 (Superman and Adam Strange) (1985)
- DC Science Fiction Graphic Novel #3 (1985) (adaptation of Ray Bradbury's "Frost and Fire")
- DCU Holiday Bash III (1999)
- Detective Comics (Batman) #510, 512, 528, 547, 553–554, 568, 681, 685–686, 720–721, 783, Annual #1, 10; (Hawkman) #446; (Green Arrow) #549–550 (1975–2003)
- Firestorm #1 (1978)
- Green Arrow #123, 137 (1997–1998)
- Heroes Against Hunger #1 (1986, two pages)
- Jemm, Son of Saturn #1–5, 7 (1984–1985)
- JLA: Classified #16–18 (2006)
- Justice League: Dream Girls – A DC Pride Event #4 (2026)
- Justice League Dark Annual #2 (2014)
- Just Imagine Stan Lee With Scott McDaniel Creating Aquaman (2002)
- The Kamandi Challenge #7 (2017)
- Legends of the DC Universe #20–21, 28–29, 37–38, 80-Page Giant #2 (1999–2001)
- Legion Worlds #5 (2001)
- Lobo: A Contract On Gawd #1 (1994)
- New Challengers #1–3 (2018)
- Orion #18 (2001)
- Secret Origins vol. 2 #33 (1988)
- Showcase '93 #7–8 (1993)
- Silverblade #1 (1987)
- Spectre vol. 3 #53 (1997)
- Strange Adventures vol. 2 #2 (1999)
- Superman #400 (1984)
- Superman vol. 3 #32–38, 40–41, 44 (2014–2015)
- Superman Forever #1 (1998)
- Superman Lex 2000 #1 (2001)
- Superman: The Man of Steel #41 (1995)
- Tangent Comics/The Batman #1 (1998)
- Who's Who in Star Trek #2 (1987)
- Who's Who in the DC Universe Update 1993 #1 (1992)
- Who's Who: The Definitive Directory of the DC Universe #2, 5, 7 (1985)
- World's Finest Comics #300 (1984)

=== Marvel Comics ===
- Amazing Adventures #25 (1974)
- The Amazing Spider-Man #209, 244, 250–251, 546, 568–573, 600, 663–664, 674–675, 680–681, 688–691, Annual #15, Annual 2000 (1980–2012)
- Astonishing Tales #31, 33–35 (1974–1976)
- The Avengers #172–173, 182–184, 382, Annual #15 (1978–1995)
- The Avengers vol. 4 #1–12, 14, 16–17 (2010–2011)
- Avengers: The Ultron Imperative #1 (2001)
- Battlestar Galactica #4–9, 11–15, 17–23 (1979–1981)
- Bizarre Adventures #27 (1981)
- Black Panther vol. 2 #36 (2001)
- Black Panther vol. 3 #1–6, 10–18 (2005–2006)
- Blood and Glory: Punisher/Captain America #1–3 (1992)
- Captain Marvel #33, 37–39 (1974–1975)
- Creatures on the Loose #33 (1975)
- Daredevil #124–132, 140, 147–152, 156–161, 163–197, 234, 500, Annual #5 (1975–1986, 2009)
- Daredevil vol. 2 #50 (2003)
- Daredevil: End of Days #1–7 (2012–2013)
- Defenders #13, 15, 19, 35–47, 51, 55–56, 58, Giant-Size #2, Annual #1 (1974–1978)
- Defenders vol. 2 #1–3 (2001)
- Doctor Strange vol. 2 #6 (1975)
- Elektra Saga #1–4 (1984)
- Fall of the Hulks: Gamma #1 (2010)
- Fantastic Four #296 (1986)
- Fantastic Four Roast #1 (1982)
- Further Adventures of Cyclops and Phoenix #1–2 (1996)
- Gambit #1–4 (1993–1994)
- Gambit vol. 2 #1–4 (1997)
- Ghost Rider, Wolverine, Punisher: Hearts of Darkness #1 (1991)
- Heroes for Hope #1 (1985, two pages)
- Howard the Duck #14–21, 25–27 (1977–1978)
- Howard the Duck (black and white magazine) #1–2, 4 (1979–1980)
- The Hulk #17–18 (Moon Knight backup stories) (1979)
- Hulk Smash #1–2 (2001)
- The Incredible Hulk #227 (1978)
- Jungle Action #6–12 (1973–1974)
- Kingpin #1–7 (2003–2004)
- Kull the Conqueror #3, 5–6 (1983–1984)
- Logan's Run #1–5, 7 (1977)
- Man-Thing #12 (1974)
- Marc Spector: Moon Knight #42 (1992)
- Marvel Age Annual #4 (1988)
- Marvel Comics Presents #1–10, 165 (1988–1994)
- Marvel Double-Shot #4 (2003)
- Marvel Holiday Special #1 (1992)
- Marvel Knights #1–6 (2000)
- Marvel Premiere #31 (1976)
- Marvel Preview #13 (1978)
- Marvel Spotlight #33 (1977)
- Marvel Super Special #3–4, 15, 18 (1978–1981)
- Marvel Treasury Edition #12 (1977)
- Marvel Two-in-One #10 (1975)
- Master of Kung Fu #23 (1974)
- Midnight Sons Unlimited #1 (1993)
- The Mighty Avengers #15 (2008)
- Monsters Unleashed #3 (1973)
- Moon Knight #4–7 (1981)
- Nova #25 (1979)
- Power Man #39 (1977)
- The Punisher vol. 2 #1–5 (1987–1988)
- The Punisher War Journal #11 (1989)
- The Punisher War Zone #1–7 (1992)
- Savage Sword of Conan #48 (1980)
- The Sensational Spider-Man #0, 1–6 (1996)
- Silver Surfer Annual '97 #1 (1997)
- Spider-Man #26, 38–40, 49 (1992–1994)
- Spider-Man Unlimited vol. 2 #15 (2006)
- Spider-Man: The Lost Years #1–3 (1995)
- St. George #1–6 (1988–1989)
- Star Trek #4–7, 10 (1980–1981)
- Star Wars Annual #3 (1983)
- Supernatural Thrillers #12 (1975)
- Supreme Power: Hyperion #1–5 (2005–2006)
- Tales of the Marvel Universe #1 (1997)
- Tarzan #14–19 (1978)
- Terminator 2: Judgment Day #1 (1991)
- Thor #240, Annual #6 (1975–1977)
- Thor vol. 2 #1–8, 10–13, 15–17, 19–22, 26–27, Annual 1999 (1998–2000)
- The Tomb of Dracula vol. 2 #4 (1980)
- Unknown Worlds of Science Fiction #3 (1975)
- Vampire Tales #2–3 (1973–1974)
- What If...? #3, 28 (1977–1981)
- What If...? vol. 2 #100 (1997)
- Wolverine vol. 2 #2, 17–22 (1988–1990)
- Wolverine vol. 3 #20–31 (2004–2005)
- World War Hulk #1–5 (2007–2008)
- X-Men Chronicles #1 (1995)
- X-Men: Legacy #208 (2008)
