= Andy Kubert =

American comic artist and writer (born 1962)

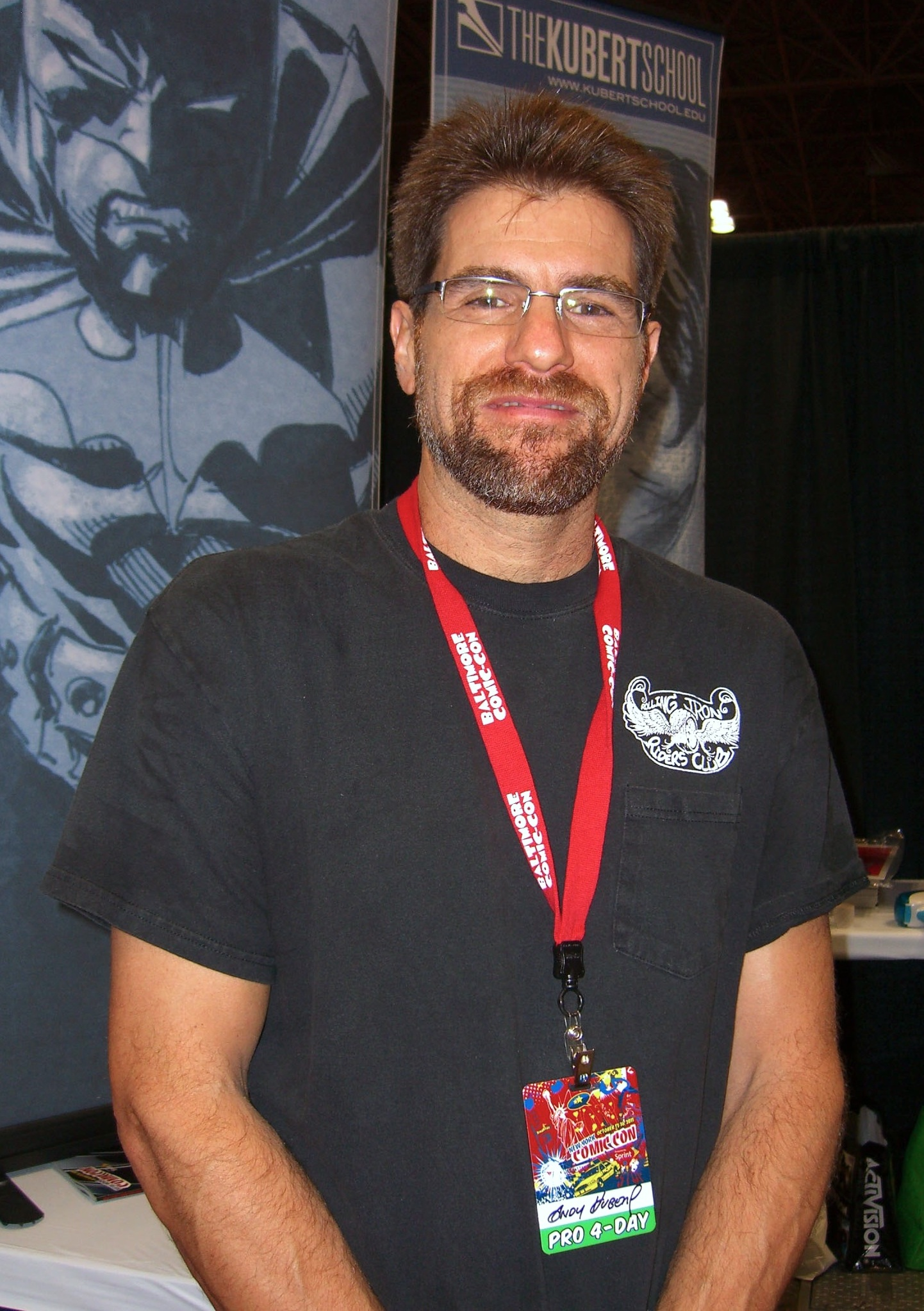
- Kubert at the 2011 New York Comic Con
- Born: Andrew Kubert; February 27, 1962 (age 64)
- Areas: Writer, Penciller, Inker
- Notable works: Batman and Son; Batman: Whatever Happened to the Caped Crusader? The Dark Knight III: The Master Race; Flashpoint; Marvel 1602; Wolverine: Origin; X-Men

Andrew Kubert (/ˈkjuːbərt/; born February 27, 1962) is an American comics artist, letterer, and writer. He is the son of Joe Kubert and brother of Adam Kubert, both of whom are also artists, and the uncle of comics editor Katie Kubert.

Kubert is a graduate of and an instructor of second-year classes at The Kubert School, founded by his father, who also taught there, and would later serve as an instructor there himself. After beginning his career as a letterer at DC Comics, Kubert went on to illustrate books for that company including Sgt. Rock and Adam Strange, as well its intercompany crossover with Dark Horse Comics, Batman Versus Predator.

He later worked for Marvel Comics, illustrated various X-Men and Ultimate Marvel-related titles, including The Uncanny X-Men, Ultimate X-Men, and Ultimate Iron Man, and provided artwork for notable storylines such as "Age of Apocalypse" in 1995. He returned to DC in 2005, where he provided art for storylines such as Batman: Cacophony, "Whatever Happened to the Caped Crusader?, "Blackest Night", "Flashpoint", and The Dark Knight III: The Master Race. During his run on Batman with writer Grant Morrison, they co-created the character Damian Wayne.

== Early life ==
Andrew Kubert is the son of Muriel (née Fogelson) and Joe Kubert, the latter of whom came from a Jewish family in southeast Poland (now Ukraine). His siblings include a sister, Lisa, and brothers David, Daniel, and Adam. He and his siblings were raised in Dover, New Jersey. He is also the uncle of comics editor Katie Kubert. He graduated from The Kubert School, which was founded by his father in Dover.

== Career ==
Andy Kubert started his comics career as a letterer at DC Comics in 1980. His first credited artwork for the company was the story "Old Soldiers Never Die" in Sgt. Rock #393 (Oct. 1984). He later drew Adam Strange and the Batman Versus Predator intercompany crossover. He is best known for his work at Marvel Comics, specifically the company's X-Men titles. An occasional cover artist on Uncanny X-Men (drawing the first cover appearance of the character Gambit) and X-Men Classic, Kubert later served as a fill-in penciller for Uncanny X-Men #279-280 and #288 before becoming the regular penciller on X-Men vol. 2 (starting with #14), following Jim Lee's departure from Marvel to form Image Comics. Kubert was one of the artists of the "X-Cutioner's Song" storyline which ran through the X-Men titles in 1992 and drew the wedding of Cyclops and Jean Grey in X-Men #30 (March 1994). Kubert drew the Amazing X-Men limited series as part of the "Age of Apocalypse" storyline in 1995. In 2001, Kubert drew two issues of the new Ultimate X-Men title. With writers Bill Jemas, Joe Quesada and Paul Jenkins, Kubert produced the Origin limited series which revealed the early history of Wolverine. Kubert collaborated with novelist Neil Gaiman on the Marvel 1602 eight-issue limited series published from November 2003 to June 2004. Writer Orson Scott Card and Kubert crafted the Ultimate Iron Man limited series in 2005.

Both Kubert and his brother, Adam, signed exclusive contracts to work for DC Comics in 2005. Andy Kubert became the penciller of the Batman series and with writer Grant Morrison introduced the Damian Wayne character.

He illustrated the covers to Batman: Cacophony, a three-issue miniseries published in November 2008. Kubert drew the two-issue Batman story by Neil Gaiman entitled, "Whatever Happened to the Caped Crusader?" This reunited Gaiman and Kubert, who previously worked together on the series Marvel 1602.

While his brother Adam has returned to Marvel Comics following his three-year deal with DC, Dan DiDio confirmed in 2009 that following "Whatever Happened to the Caped Crusader?", Kubert had two more Batman projects in the works, one of which he would write himself. He contributed covers to the Blackest Night: Batman mini-series, as well as variant covers for "Blackest Night" issues of Green Lantern.

In late 2009, DC announced that Andy Kubert was working on two DC stories, one featuring Batman, the other featuring the DCU. Kubert's father Joe inked over his pencils on the first two issues of DC Universe: Legacies, a 10-issue series chronicling the history of the DC Universe. Andy Kubert contributed to Batman #700, teaming again with Grant Morrison to tell another tale of Damian Wayne as Batman in the future as part of the oversized anniversary issue. In 2011 Kubert illustrated the DC miniseries Flashpoint. In 2013 Kubert wrote and drew Damian: Son of the Batman, a four-issue mini series about Robin in an alternate future. Kubert was one of the artists on The Dark Knight III: The Master Race which was co-written by Frank Miller and Brian Azzarello. Kubert collaborated with writer Scott Snyder on the New Challengers, part of the Dark Metal project in 2018.

Kubert was one of the creators of a revived Batman: Black and White anthology series which debuted on December 8, 2020.

=== Teaching ===
Kubert and his brother Adam teach at their family business and alma mater, the Joe Kubert School.

== Bibliography ==
=== DC Comics ===
Artwork for the cover of Batman #655 (Sept. 2006), the first issue of "Batman and Son"

- 52 #46 (2007)
- Action Comics Weekly #636 (Phantom Stranger) (1989)
- Action Comics vol. 2 #5–6 (2012)
- Adam Strange #1–3 (1990)
- The Adventures of Superman #442, 460 (1988–89)
- Batman #400 (letterer on Chapter VIII), 655–658, 664–666, 686, 700 (1985, 2006–10)
- Batman vol. 2 #18; #23.1 (writer) (2013)
- Batman Black and White vol. 5 #1 (2020)
- Batman Versus Predator #1–3 (1992)
- Before Watchmen: Nite Owl #1–4 (2012–13)
- Christmas with the Super-Heroes #2 (finisher on the Enemy Ace story "Silent Night") (1989)
- Damian: Son of Batman #1–4 (writer/artist) (2013–14)
- Dark Days: The Forge #1 (2017)
- The Dark Knight III: The Master Race #1–9 (2015–17)
- DC Universe: Legacies #1–2 (2010)
- Detective Comics #853 (2009)
- Doc Savage #1–4 (1987–88)
- Flashpoint #1–5 (2011)
- Justice League of America #0 (2006)
- New Challengers #1–4 (2018)
- Sgt. Rock #393 (writer/inker); #394, 401, 408–415, 417–419, 422 (1984–88)
- Superman: Up in the Sky #1-6 (2019-2020)
- The Warlord #98–99, 101 (1985–86)

=== Eclipse Comics ===
- Airboy vol. 2 #50 (1989)

=== Marvel Comics ===
- Amazing X-Men #1–4 (1995)
- The Avengers #334 (1991)
- Captain America vol. 3 #8–12, 14–17, 19–22, 25–28, 30–31 (1998–2000)
- Conan the Barbarian #201 (1987)
- Ghost Rider, vol. 3, #24, 28–31 (1992)
- Ka-Zar, vol. 4, #1–5, 7–11, 14 (1997–98)
- Mark Hazzard: Merc #9 (1987)
- Marvel 1602 #1–8 (2003–04)
- Origin #1–6 (2001–02)
- The Punisher War Journal #31 (1991)
- Savage Sword of Conan #114, 136, 160 (1985–89)
- Semper Fi #2–3, 5–6, 8 (1989)
- Tales of the Marvel Universe #1 (1997)
- Thor vol. 2 #29–32, 34–35 (2000–01)
- Ultimate Iron Man #1–5 (2005–06)
- Ultimate X-Men #5–6, 50–53 (2001–2005)
- Uncanny X-Men #279–280, 288 (1991–1992)
- What The--?! #11 (1991)
- Wolverine #51 (1992)
- Wolverine: Rahne of Terra #1 (1991)
- X-Factor #57 (1990)
- X-Men, vol. 2, #14–20, 22–26, 28–34, 36–38, 40–41, 44–47, 50, 52–57, 59 (1992–96)

=== Pacific Comics ===
- Skateman #1 (1983)

Preceded by Art Thibert	X-Men vol. 2 artist 1992–1996	Succeeded by Cedric Nocon
Preceded by Dale Eaglesham	Captain America vol. 3 artist 1998–2000	Succeeded by Jerry Ordway
Preceded by Don Kramer	Batman artist 2006–2007	Succeeded by J. H. Williams III
