= The Matrix Comics =

Set of comics and short stories

Publication information
- Publisher: Burlyman Entertainment
- Format: Web comics, trade paperback, hardcover

Creative team
- Created by: Various (including the Wachowskis, Geof Darrow, Neil Gaiman, Dave Gibbons, etc.)

The Matrix Comics is a set of comics and short stories based on The Matrix film series and written and illustrated by figures from the comics industry. One of the comics was written by the Wachowskis and illustrated by the films' concept artist Geof Darrow. The comics and stories were originally presented for free on the Matrix series' website between 1999 and 2003. One of them was printed in 1999 to be given away at theaters as a promotional item for The Matrix, but Warner Bros. recalled it due to its mature content. Most of them were later republished by the Wachowskis' Burlyman Entertainment, along with some new stories and updates with color to some of the existing ones, in two printed trade paperback volumes in 2003 and 2004 and a deluxe hardcover twentieth anniversary edition in 2019.

By September 2004, the first printed volume had sold over 60,000 copies.

== Contents ==
Based on the 20th anniversary edition, the following comics were published:

- "Bits and Pieces of Information" by Lana & Lilly Wachowski and Geof Darrow
- "Sweating the Small Stuff" by Bill Sienkiewicz
- "A Life Less Empty" by Ted McKeever
- "Goliath" by Neil Gaiman, Bill Sienkiewicz, Gregory Ruth
- "Burning Hope" by John Van Fleet
- "Butterfly" by Dave Gibbons
- "A Sword of a Different Color" by Troy Nixey
- "Get It?" by Peter Bagge
- "There Are No Flowers in the Real World" by David Lapham
- "The Miller's Tale" by Paul Chadwick
- "Artistic Freedom" by Ryder Windham and Kilian Plunkett
- "Hunters and Collectors" by Gregory Ruth
- "An Easy One" by Tommy Lee Edwards
- "Farewell Performance" by Jim Krueger, Tim Sale
- "Déjà Vu" by Paul Chadwick
- "System Freeze" by Poppy Z. Brite, Dave Dorman, Michael Kaluta
- "The King of Never Return" by Ted McKeever
- "An Asset to the System" by Troy Nixey
- "A Path Among Stones" by Gregory Ruth
- "Run, Saga, Run" by Keron Grant, Rob Stull
- "Wrong Number" by Vince Evans
- "Broadcast Depth" by Bill Sienkiewicz
- "Who Says You Can't Get Good Help These Days?" by Peter Bagge
- "Saviors" by Spencer Lamm, Michael Avon Oeming
- "I Kant" by Kaare Andrews
- "Day In... Day Out" by Ted McKeever, Keron Grant
- "Return of the Prodigal Son" by Gregory Ruth
- "Let It All Fall Down" by Paul Chadwick

== Collected editions ==
- The Matrix Comics, Vol. 1 by various (Burlyman Entertainment, 2003) ISBN 1-932700-00-5
- The Matrix Comics, Vol. 2 by various (Burlyman Entertainment, 2004) ISBN 1-932700-09-9
- The Matrix Comics: 20th Anniversary Edition by various (Burlyman Entertainment, 2019) ISBN 978-1932700572
