= The Wachowskis =

American filmmakers

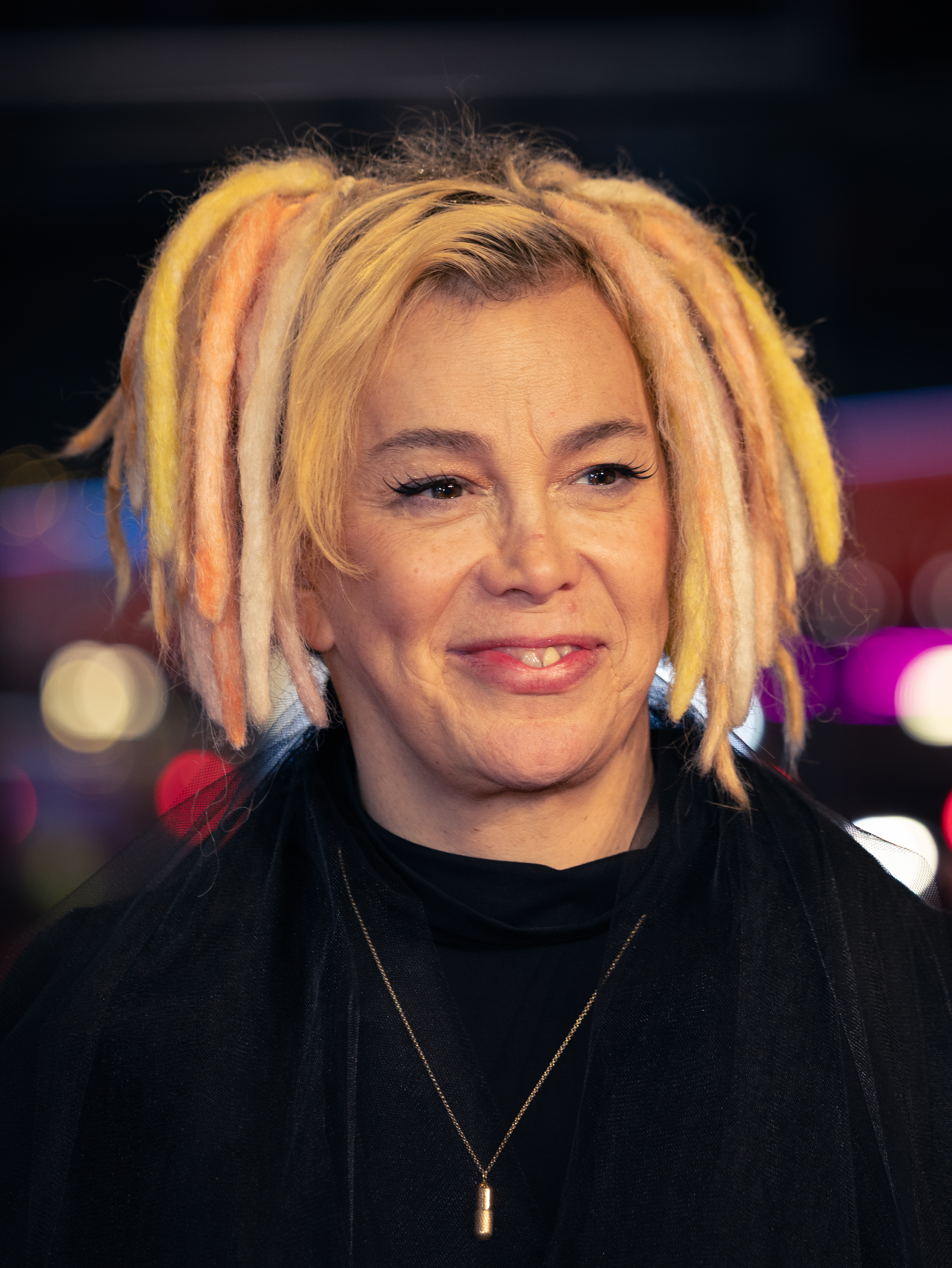
- Lana in 2025
- Born: Laurence Wachowski; June 21, 1965 (age 61); Lana Andrew Paul Wachowski; December 29, 1967 (age 58); Lilly; Chicago, Illinois, U.S.
- Other names: Collectively: The Wachowskis; The Wachowski brothers (Note: Before 2010) The Wachowski sisters The Wachowski siblings
- Occupations: Film and television directors, writers, producers
- Years active: 1994–present
- Notable work: Bound; The Matrix series; V for Vendetta; Speed Racer; Cloud Atlas; Jupiter Ascending; Sense8
- Spouses: Lana: Thea Bloom (m. 1993; div. 2002) Karin Winslow (m. 2009) Lilly: Alicia Blasingame (m. 1991)
- Relatives: Laurence Luckinbill (uncle)

Lana Wachowski (/wəˈtʃaʊski/; (Note: Polish pronunciation: [vaˈxɔfski]) formerly Larry Wachowski, born June 21, 1965) and Lilly Wachowski (formerly Andy Wachowski, born December 29, 1967) are American film and television directors, writers and producers. (Note: Attributed to multiple references:) Together known as the Wachowskis, the sisters are both trans women and have worked as a writing and directing team throughout most of their careers. (Note: Together, the sisters were formerly known as the Wachowski brothers. They have also been referred to in the media as the Wachowski sisters and the Wachowski siblings.) (Note: Attributed to multiple references:) They made their directing debut with Bound (1996), and achieved fame with The Matrix (1999), a major box-office success for which they won the Saturn Award for Best Director. They wrote and directed two sequels, The Matrix Reloaded and The Matrix Revolutions (both in 2003), and were involved in the writing and production of other works in the Matrix franchise.

Following the commercial success of the Matrix series, the Wachowskis wrote and produced the 2005 film V for Vendetta, an adaptation of the graphic novel by Alan Moore and David Lloyd, and in 2008 released Speed Racer, a live-action adaptation of the Japanese anime series. Their next film, Cloud Atlas, based on the novel by David Mitchell and co-written and co-directed by Tom Tykwer, was released in 2012. Their film Jupiter Ascending and the Netflix series Sense8, the latter of which they co-created with J. Michael Straczynski, debuted in 2015; the second season of Sense8 ended the series in 2018 and was Lana's first major project without Lilly.

Since Sense8, the Wachowskis have been working on separate projects: Lilly directed, wrote, and executive-produced episodes of Showtime's Work in Progress (2019) while Lana directed The Matrix Resurrections (2021).

== Early lives and careers ==
Lana and Lilly were born in Chicago, Illinois in 1965 and 1967, respectively. Their mother, Lynne (née Luckinbill), was a nurse and painter. Their father, Ron Wachowski, was a businessman of Polish descent. Their uncle is Laurence Luckinbill, an actor and Primetime Emmy Award-winning producer. Ron and Lynne died five weeks apart in the late 2010s. Lana and Lilly have two other sisters, Julie and Laura. Julie was assistant coordinator for the film Bound; she is a novelist and screenwriter.

The Wachowskis attended the Kellogg Elementary School in Chicago's Beverly area, and graduated from Whitney Young High School, known for its performing arts and science curriculum, in 1983 and 1985, respectively. Former classmates recall them playing Dungeons & Dragons and working in the school's theater and TV program.

Lana went to Bard College, in Annandale-on-Hudson, New York; Lilly attended Emerson College, in Boston, Massachusetts. Each dropped out before graduating, and they ran a house-painting and construction business in Chicago.

Beginning in 1993, they wrote several issues of Ectokid for Marvel Comics' Razorline imprint (created by horror novelist Clive Barker), which were credited to Lana. They also wrote for the series Clive Barker's Hellraiser and Clive Barker's Nightbreed for Marvel's Epic Comics imprint.

== Film and television careers ==
=== Early film projects ===
In the mid-1990s, they went into film writing, including the script for Assassins in 1994, which was directed by Richard Donner and released in 1995. Warner Bros. bought the script and included two more pictures in the contract. Donner had their script "totally rewritten" by Brian Helgeland and the Wachowskis tried unsuccessfully to remove their names from the film. They say the experience gave them the perspective that they should become directors or "[they will] never survive as writers in this town".

Their next project was the 1996 neo-noir thriller Bound, for which they wrote the script and made their debut as directors. The film was well received for its style and craft, and was noted as one of the first mainstream films to feature a same-sex relationship without it being central to the plot. Taking advantage of the positive buzz, the Wachowskis asked to direct their next picture, The Matrix.

=== The Matrix franchise ===
They completed The Matrix, a science fiction action film, in 1999. The movie stars Keanu Reeves as Neo, a hacker recruited by a rebellion to aid them in the fight against machines that have taken over the world and placed humanity inside a simulated reality called "the Matrix". Laurence Fishburne, Carrie-Anne Moss, Hugo Weaving and Joe Pantoliano also star. The movie was a critical and commercial hit for Warner Bros. It won four Academy Awards, including for "Best Visual Effects" for popularizing the bullet time visual effect. The Matrix came to be a major influence for action movies and has appeared in several "greatest science fiction films" lists. In 2012, the film was selected for preservation in the National Film Registry by the Library of Congress for being "culturally, historically, and aesthetically significant".

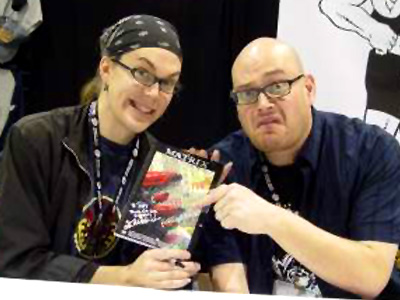
The Wachowskis at the 2004 San Diego Comic-Con

After its success, the Wachowskis directed two sequels back-to-back, The Matrix Reloaded and The Matrix Revolutions, both released in 2003. The Matrix Reloaded received positive critical reception, although not on the level of the original. It became a major box office hit, retaining the spot of the highest-grossing R-rated film for over a decade (until 2016's Deadpool). The Matrix Revolutions received a mixed critical reception and performed only moderately in the box office. Although profitable, it was slightly less so compared to the original film.

During production of the first film, the Wachowskis and Spencer Lamm, who ran the film's official website, developed comics based on the setting of the film, which were published free of charge on the website. These and a few short stories were released in three series from 1999 to 2003, with several of them (along with new material) collected in two print volumes in 2003 and 2004. The Wachowskis themselves contributed "Bits and Pieces", a prequel to the movie that explains the origins of the Matrix, featuring illustrations by Geof Darrow, the movie's conceptual designer. Other writers and artists that contributed to the series include Neil Gaiman, Dave Gibbons, Paul Chadwick, Ted McKeever, Poppy Z. Brite, and Steve Skroce.

After Lilly Wachowski came out as transgender, she encouraged looking back on her and Lana's works "through the lens of our transness", saying that the themes of identity, self-image and transformation are apparent in The Matrix.

=== Later collaborations ===
The Wachowskis' next feature film was V for Vendetta, an adaptation of Alan Moore and David Lloyd's graphic novel of the same name, starring Natalie Portman and Hugo Weaving. They wrote and produced the film with Matrix producer Joel Silver, who had previously purchased the film rights to the graphic novel. The Wachowskis offered the film to James McTeigue, the first assistant director of The Matrix trilogy, as his directorial debut. Moore did not participate in the production, as he was disappointed by previous Hollywood adaptations of his work, and disagreed with differences between his graphic novel and the screenplay. Following a statement to the press by Silver that Moore was supposedly excited to learn more about the movie, Moore demanded that Silver retract it, and had his own name removed from the credits when he did not. The film's controversial storyline and themes have been both criticized and praised by sociopolitical groups. It was released in 2005 and was well received critically; it was a box office success but did not rank on the scale of The Matrix films. The film popularized the image of the Guy Fawkes mask, as the version designed by David Lloyd for the graphic novel and used in the movie was adopted as a symbol by the online hacktivist group Anonymous two years later.

In 2006, Silver had the Wachowskis and McTeigue hired to revamp The Invasion for Warner Bros. The studio was disappointed in the original cut of the film by director Oliver Hirschbiegel and hired the Wachowskis to rewrite a portion of the script and add new action scenes, which McTeigue directed. The film, the fourth adaptation of the novel The Body Snatchers, was released in 2007 and was not a critical or box office success. The Wachowskis and McTeigue are not credited on the film.

The Wachowskis returned to directing with Speed Racer (2008) which starred Emile Hirsch. The film, which was again produced by Silver, was an adaptation of a 1960s Japanese manga series originally called Mach GoGoGo, which had previously been adapted as an anime television series in 1967. The Wachowskis were attracted to the project because the series was the first anime they had watched, and they wanted to make a family-friendly film for their nieces and nephews to enjoy. In an effort to simulate the look of anime in live action, the Wachowskis had cinematographer David Tattersall shoot the movie digitally on a digital backlot with the intention of adding extensive visual effects in post-production. The movie was considered a critical and commercial failure. While its special effects were noted as outstanding, the storyline is considered lacking. It was nominated in the category of "Worst Prequel, Remake, Rip-off or Sequel" for the 29th Golden Raspberry Awards. Its box office gross was $93 million compared to a production budget of $120 million. Since then, critics periodically have put the film on lists of underrated or cult films.

The Wachowskis' next film project was Ninja Assassin, a martial arts film starring Rain, which was released in 2009. It was inspired by Rain's fighting scene in Speed Racer. It was produced by the Wachowskis in their last involvement with Silver, and directed by McTeigue. The screenplay was written by Matthew Sand and J. Michael Straczynski, whom the Wachowskis called six weeks before filming to ask him for a total rewrite completed within a week, because they were dissatisfied with the earlier drafts and were running out of time. Ninja Assassin received negative reviews and performed lukewarmly in the theaters but respectably on home video.

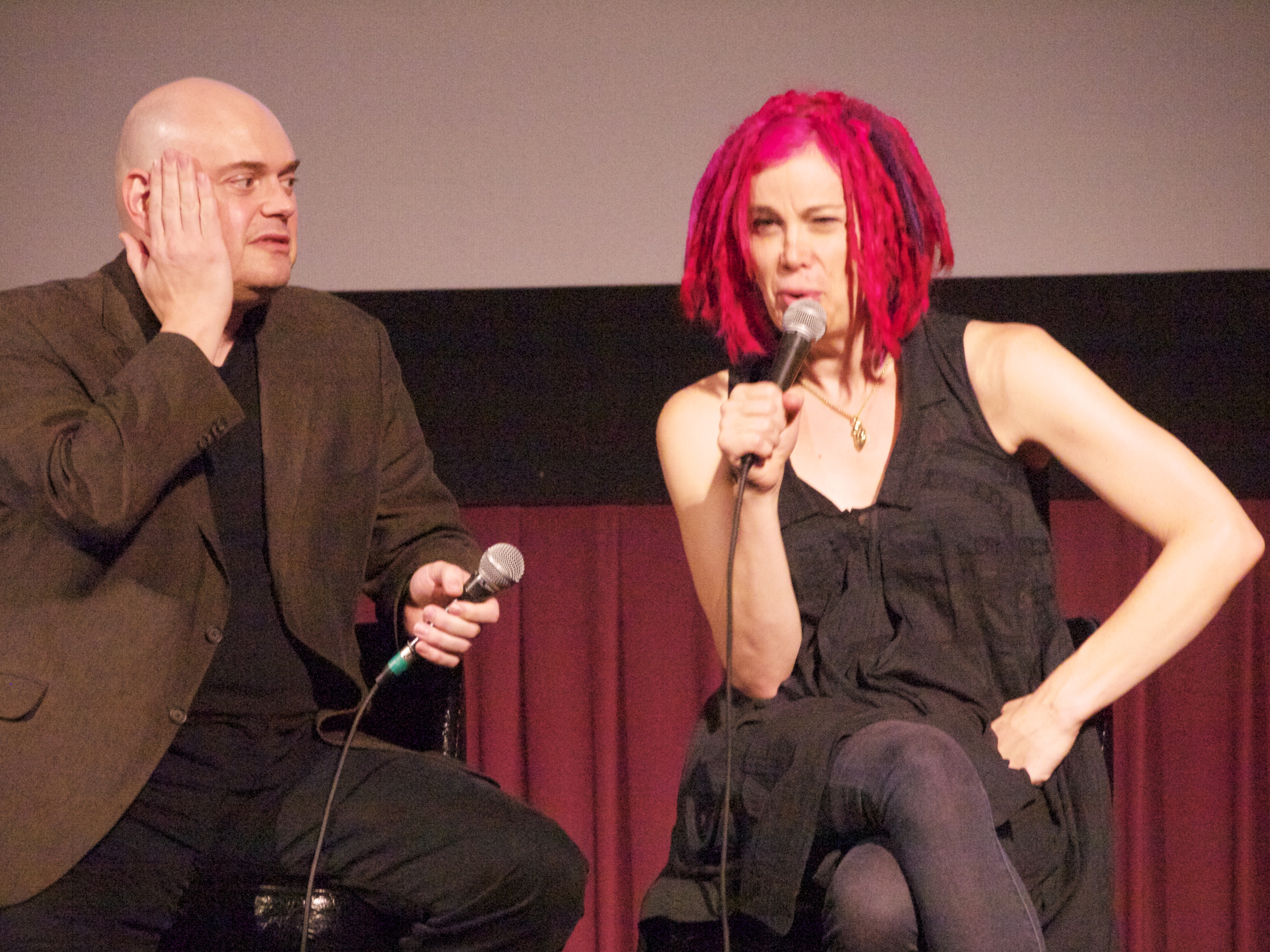
Lilly (left) and Lana Wachowski at Fantastic Fest in 2012

Their next directorial outing was Cloud Atlas, which was adapted from David Mitchell's 2004 novel of the same name and starred an ensemble cast which included Tom Hanks and Halle Berry. Cloud Atlas was written and directed in collaboration with German filmmaker Tom Tykwer, to whom the Wachowskis had introduced the novel several years earlier. The filmmakers failed to secure funding from a studio (save for $20 million by Warner Bros.) and the film was produced independently after much trouble. With a budget of over $100 million it was noted as the most expensive independent movie to that date and the first attempt at a German blockbuster. The movie opened at the 37th annual Toronto International Film Festival in September 2012 to acclaim and received a loud and lengthy standing ovation. In its general release a month later, it received polarized reviews and eventually appeared in both "Best Film" and "Worst Film" lists. Overall reviews were mixed to positive. The film received many nominations and awards, particularly for its technical aspects, including 10 nominations for the German Film Award, out of which it won five. It also received five Saturn Award nominations, out of which it won two. David Mitchell liked the script of Cloud Atlas, spent some time on the set (including filming a cameo), and had a positive impression about the result. According to the Wachowskis the movie was the hardest of their films to make, the one they are the most proud of, and the one they have been told has touched people's lives the most. They believe Cloud Atlas will be the film for which they will be remembered.

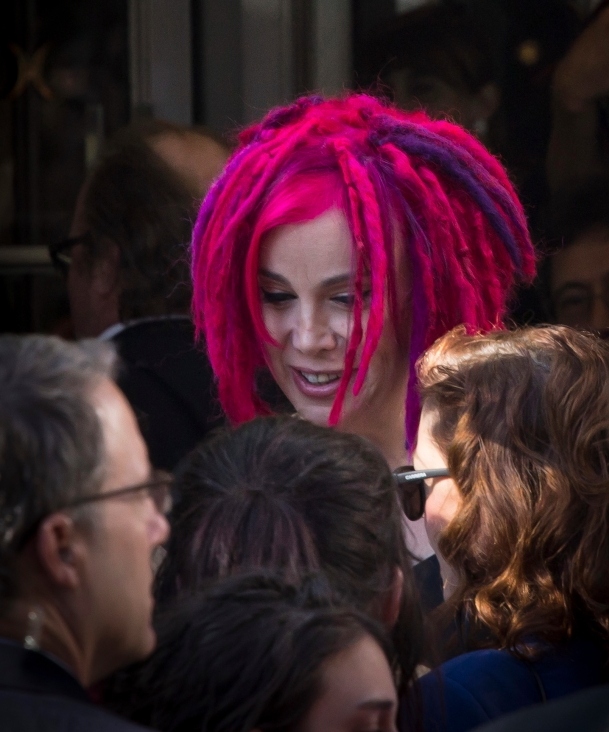
Lana at 2012 Toronto International Film Festival

The Wachowskis subsequently produced and directed Jupiter Ascending, an original space opera screenplay they wrote. The film was released in 2015. It stars Channing Tatum and Mila Kunis, and features the Wachowskis' regular collaborators John Gaeta on visual effects and Kym Barrett on costumes. According to Deadline, the financial and critical failure of Jupiter Ascending caused their business relationship with Warner Bros, that began with The Matrix franchise, to be terminated.

Their next project was the Netflix science fiction drama series Sense8, created and written with J. Michael Straczynski. Sense8 features an international ensemble cast and was shot in multiple cities around the world. The Wachowskis directed most of the episodes of the first season, with the rest being handled by McTeigue, Tykwer, and their go-to visual effects supervisor on their movies, Dan Glass, in his directorial debut. The first season premiered in 2015 to generally positive reviews, particularly for the scale of the production and the presentation of diverse and LGBT characters and themes, winning the GLAAD Media Award for Outstanding Drama Series. It also received a Primetime Emmy Award nomination for Outstanding Original Main Title Theme Music. After the first season, Lilly took a break from production for the remainder of the series. A Christmas special was released on December 23, 2016, with the remainder of the show's second season released in May 2017. Subsequently, the third season was canceled, and Sense8 concluded with a two-hour finale which aired in June 2018.

In June 2016, the Academy of Motion Picture Arts and Sciences invited the Wachowskis to join its ranks. However, in April 2025, Lilly Wachowski said "I'm not in the Academy. I'm not going to join the Academy" during an interview.

=== Solo projects ===
Lilly co-wrote and co-showrun the eight-episode first season of the drama-comedy series Work in Progress (2019), created by Abby McEnany and Tim Mason for Showtime. In January 2020, the series was renewed for a 10-episode second season, with which Lilly would continue to be involved.

Lana returned to write, direct and produce The Matrix Resurrections (2021), the fourth installment of the Matrix series, with Reeves and Moss also reprising their roles; it marks the first film made by only one of the Wachowskis. Lana wrote the script with David Mitchell and Aleksandar Hemon.

In February 2024, Collider announced that Lilly would direct Trash Mountain, a film about a young gay man returning from Chicago to rural Missouri to deal with the aftermath of his hoarder father's death. The film, Lilly's first directorial effort since Jupiter Ascending, will star Caleb Hearon, be written by Hearon and Ruby Caster and will be produced by Colin Trevorrow, Eddie Vaisman and Julia Lebedev.

In April 2024, it was announced that Warner Bros. was developing a new Matrix installment with Drew Goddard attached to write and direct, for which Lana will serve as an executive producer.

In October 2024, Lilly revealed to Autostraddle that she and her partner Mickey Ray Mahoney had written a queer/trans script titled The Hunt. She also announced her plans to make adaptations of novels authored by trans authors, specifically Manhunt by Gretchen Felker-Martin and Confessions of the Fox by Jordy Rosenberg, as well an adaptation with Emily Andras of Hannah Templer's comic book Cosmoknights.

In July 2025, it was announced that Lilly would serve as executive producer for Dolls, a short film directed by Geena Rocero. The film was described as an adaptation of The Stepford Wives with an all-trans cast.

== Style and influences ==
J. Michael Straczynski, who has worked with the Wachowskis on Ninja Assassin and Sense8, has said that the sisters told him they were reading his column on scriptwriting for the Writer's Digest magazine, for inspiration and pointers. Straczynski contributed to the magazine from 1981 to 1991.

In 1998, in the context of explaining how they got their start in filmmaking, the Wachowskis mentioned Roger Corman's book How I Made A Hundred Movies in Hollywood and Never Lost a Dime, and indicated, with laughter, that they liked his movies, and began by wanting to "make a low-budget horror movie". In the same interview they stated that they felt flattered, after their first film, by comparisons others had made between them and the Coen brothers, who had "made five, maybe six great movies..." at that time.

Speaking to Bernard Weintraub of The New York Times in April 1999, the Wachowskis mentioned explicitly that they prepared for their first Matrix production by studying the works of John Woo "and other Hong Kong filmmakers", as well as reading and rereading Homer's Odyssey, and studying the works of John Huston, Stanley Kubrick, Fritz Lang, George Lucas, Ridley Scott, and Billy Wilder.

Mark Miller, writing in Wired in 2003, also listed Homer, Hermann Hesse, Fyodor Dostoyevsky, and philosopher Cornel West. In an interview with Gadfly in 1998 (after their first movie), the Wachowskis reiterated their influence by or enjoyment of Huston (e.g. Treasure of the Sierra Madre) and Wilder (e.g., Sunset Boulevard and Lost Weekend), and added to these the impacts of Alfred Hitchcock (e.g. Strangers on a Train and Psycho), Roman Polanski (e.g. Repulsion), and Francis Ford Coppola (the Godfather movies, and The Conversation).

Ken Wilber has been cited as an influence.

The Wachowskis admit to a love for telling multi-part stories. "Because we grew up on comic books and the Tolkien trilogy, one of the things we're interested in is bringing serial fiction to cinema," Lana has said. Lilly says: "We think movies are fairly boring and predictable. We want to screw with audiences' expectations." In terms of themes expressed in their body of work, Lana has cited "the inexplicable nature of the universe [being] in constant dialogue with our own consciousness and our consciousness actually affect[ing] the inexplicable nature of the universe", "interconnectivity and about truth beneath the surface", "the paradox of choice and choicelessness", "transcendence ... transcending archetypal boxes, stereotypes", "race ... an important component" and "gender ... it's one of our most significant cultural subjects".

The Wachowskis cited the art of comic book artist Geof Darrow as an influence on the look of The Matrix. Also, they said that Ghost in the Shell, Ninja Scroll, and Akira were anime that inspired them, saying "in anime, one thing that they do that we tried to bring to our film was a juxtaposition of time and space in action beats".

The Wachowskis cited Stanley Kubrick's 2001: A Space Odyssey as a major influence for Cloud Atlas. They first saw the film when they were ten and seven, respectively.

Lana has most been influenced by 2001: A Space Odyssey, Blade Runner, Ma vie en rose, and My Neighbor Totoro. Both Wachowskis are fans of the Ghost in the Shell, Akira, Wicked City, Ninja Scroll and Fist of the North Star anime films. Lilly has singled out The Silence of the Lambs with criticism for its portrayal of transgender characters through Ted Levine's Buffalo Bill, accusing the film in her Windy City Times coming-out statement from March 2016 for having "demonized and vilified" the transgender community, with the media often using it for anti-transgender attack ads to paint trans women as potential predators to prevent them from using women's bathrooms, arguing "We are not predators, we are prey".

None of the home video releases of their films feature any deleted scenes. Lana says that despite often having to cut scenes from their movies, they do not want to include deleted scenes in such releases, as this would suggest that their films suffer from incompleteness. They love their finished products and believe them complete. For the same reason, they have not released their films for home video with director's or extended cuts. They also avoid recording audio commentary tracks, having participated only on the track recorded for the LaserDisc of Bound. The sisters say they learned that offering an interpretation of their films means that viewers will be less likely to express their own interpretation.

== Frequent collaborators ==
The Wachowskis frequently hire the same basic film crew to make their movies. Lana says they do it in part to ensure a positive environment. "It's like family. Everyone is very respectful of each other," says Lana. They used the same practice while selecting the television crew for their Netflix show, Sense8.

Some of their most notable frequent collaborators are:

=== Crew members ===
Crew member	Bound	The Matrix	The Matrix Reloaded	The Matrix Revolutions	Speed Racer	Cloud Atlas	Jupiter Ascending	Sense8	Roles	Additional collaborations
Kym Barrett		Yes	Yes	Yes	Yes	Yes	Yes		Costume designer	Also credited in Enter the Matrix.
Hugh Bateup		Yes	Yes	Yes	Yes	Yes	Yes	Yes	Production designer, (supervising) art director	
Alexander Berner						Yes	Yes		Film editor	
Geof Darrow		Yes	Yes	Yes	Uncredited	Uncredited	Uncredited		Conceptual designer, conceptual artist	Also worked on Speed Racer, Cloud Atlas, Jupiter Ascending. Founded Burlyman Entertainment along with the Wachowskis and Steve Skroce and worked on Shaolin Cowboy, Doc Frankenstein and The Matrix Comics.
Dane Davis	Yes	Yes	Yes	Yes	Yes		Yes	Yes	Sound designer, supervising sound editor	Also credited in The Animatrix, Ninja Assassin and Enter the Matrix.
Don Davis	Yes	Yes	Yes	Yes					Composer	Also credited in The Animatrix, Enter the Matrix and The Matrix Online.
John Gaeta		Yes	Yes	Yes	Yes		Yes		Visual effects supervisor, visual effects designer	Also credited in Ninja Assassin, Enter the Matrix and The Matrix Comics.
Dan Glass			Yes	Yes	Yes	Yes	Yes	Yes	Visual effects supervisor, TV episode director	Directed an episode of Sense8. Also credited in V for Vendetta, Ninja Assassin and Enter the Matrix.
Michael Giacchino					Yes		Yes		Composer	
Grant Hill			Yes	Yes	Yes	Yes	Yes	Yes	Producer, executive producer, unit production manager	Also credited in V for Vendetta, Ninja Assassin and Enter the Matrix.
James McTeigue		Yes	Yes	Yes	Yes			Yes	First assistant director, second unit director, TV episode director	Also worked on The Invasion and Enter the Matrix. Also director of the Wachowski-produced V for Vendetta and Ninja Assassin.
Owen Paterson		Yes	Yes	Yes	Yes				Production designer	Also credited in V for Vendetta and Enter the Matrix.
Bill Pope	Yes	Yes	Yes	Yes					Director of photography	Also credited in Enter the Matrix. Pope says he hasn't been asked to work again with the Wachowskis since a fall out they had during The Matrix Reloaded and The Matrix Revolutions.
Joel Silver		Yes	Yes	Yes	Yes				Producer	Also producer of Assassins, The Animatrix (executive producer), V for Vendetta, Ninja Assassin, Enter the Matrix and The Matrix Online. According to a March 2017 article by The Hollywood Reporter, Silver has a strained relationship with the Wachowskis.
Steve Skroce		Yes	Yes	Yes	Yes	Uncredited	Uncredited	Uncredited	Storyboard artist	Also worked on Cloud Atlas, Jupiter Ascending and Sense8. Also credited in V for Vendetta and Ninja Assassin. Founded Burlyman Entertainment along with the Wachowskis and Geof Darrow, and worked on Ectokid, Doc Frankenstein, and The Matrix Comics.
Zach Staenberg	Yes	Yes	Yes	Yes	Yes				Film editor	Also credited in Enter the Matrix, The Matrix: Path of Neo.
Ethan Stoller					Yes		Yes	Yes	Music consultant, music editor, composer	Also provided music for the extras in the home video releases of Speed Racer and was credited in V for Vendetta, Ninja Assassin and Google Me Love. He has known the Wachowskis since high school.
John Toll						Yes	Yes	Yes	Director of photography, executive producer	
Tom Tykwer				Yes		Yes		Yes	Composer, co-writer, co-director, TV episode director	
Jeremy Woodhead					Yes	Yes	Yes		Makeup, hair and prosthetics designer	Also credited in V for Vendetta and Ninja Assassin.

=== Cast member ===
Cast member	Bound	The Matrix trilogy	Speed Racer	Cloud Atlas	Jupiter Ascending	Sense8	Additional collaborations
James D'Arcy				Yes	Yes		
Bae Doona				Yes	Yes	Yes	
Kick Gurry			Yes		Yes	Yes (Season 2)	
Tuppence Middleton					Yes	Yes	
Christian Oliver			Yes			Yes	
Joe Pantoliano	Yes	Yes (the first film)				Yes	
Susan Sarandon			Yes	Yes			
Hugo Weaving		Yes		Yes			Also starred in V for Vendetta, made an appearance in Enter the Matrix and was credited in The Matrix: Path of Neo for the use of clips from The Matrix films in which he featured.

== Film production and comic book publishing ==
The Animatrix logo

During The Matrix Reloaded, The Matrix Revolutions, The Animatrix and Enter the Matrix production, the Wachowskis created EON Entertainment (not to be confused with Eon Productions), their production company to coordinate and direct all involved partners. It is also where the films were edited together, after the various FX vendors sent their finished work. EON's internal VFX team, ESC, did a number of visual effect shots for the two Matrix sequels and coordinated the other vendors. ESC was shut down in summer 2004. Anarchos Productions (credited in Cloud Atlas as Anarchos Pictures) is their production company that has been billed for all their films starting with V for Vendetta up to the first season of Sense8. In the second season and following Lilly's break from the show, Anarchos is replaced by Venus Castina Productions, a production company created by Lana Wachowski and her wife Karin Winslow. Venus Castina is an epithet of the Roman goddess Venus, who in this form, was supposedly associated with "the yearnings of feminine souls locked up in male bodies". In the Sense8 series finale, the real book Venus Castina: Famous Female Impersonators Celestial and Human makes an appearance as the unlikely object that brought a lesbian couple together; according to Lana and the actresses that portray the couple, the duo have been based on Lana and Karin.

Kinowerks is their pre- and post-production and effects studio, based in the Ravenswood neighborhood of Chicago. It has been acclaimed for its green-friendly design, including solar panels, a planted roof, countertops and floors made of recycled materials, plug-in car stations, a water reuse and filtration system, skylights, and a pneumatic elevator. Roger Ebert was invited to watch a restored print of The Godfather in the Kinowerks facilities and met the Wachowskis, but he was oblivious to the fact the studio belonged to them. According to the Chicago Tribune's Christopher Pirelli, the facility is very low-key: "an industrial building that appears neither old nor especially new" and "It could be an upscale dentist's office" while the "inside is rather unexpected" and has numerous mementos of past film projects. On October 22, 2018, the Wachowskis announced their plans to close and list Kinowerks for $5 million.

In 2003, they created Burlyman Entertainment and released comic books based on The Matrix as well as two original bi-monthly series:

- Shaolin Cowboy – created, written, and drawn by Geof Darrow (the Wachowskis contributed the opening dialogue to each issue)
- Doc Frankenstein – created by Geof Darrow and Steve Skroce, written by the Wachowskis, with art by Skroce.

== Unrealized projects ==
The Wachowskis' first script was a thriller called Carnivore. It has been described as "a Corman-style, low-budget horror movie that dealt with cannibalism or, more specifically, rich people being eaten by cannibals". The writing was well received and the script achieved notice for the duo; however, interest in making the movie was low, for executives told them: "This is a bad idea. I can't make this. I'm rich." Years later, on April 6, 1999, a week after The Matrix opened in American theaters, Variety reported Trimark was looking to buy the script and were in talks with George A. Romero to direct it with production scheduled to begin in August. In April 2001, news of the Wachowskis producing it for Lionsgate and looking for a director surfaced again, and in August 2003 a second time, with their go-to cinematographer Bill Pope rumored to be making his directorial debut with it. The film ultimately went unproduced.

Another two of their earliest scripts which were never produced were Plastic Man, based on the DC Comics superhero of the same name and Vertical Run based on the book of the same name by Joseph R. Garber.

After completing The Matrix, the Wachowskis were looking to make an animated adaptation of Frank Miller's Hard Boiled graphic novel. The comic was drawn by Geof Darrow, the conceptional designer of The Matrix and later its sequels. The project didn't move forward because Miller didn't want it to be an animated film.

In November 2000, Variety reported the Wachowskis would produce, co-create and direct second unit on a new Conan the Barbarian movie for Warner Bros. which was to be written and directed by John Milius and which could see Arnold Schwarzenegger make an appearance. The Wachowskis were planning to juggle their pre-production involvement on the movie and work on The Matrix sequels at the same time. In January 2004 it was reported that development on King Conan: Crown of Iron had stalled for years because of the Wachowskis' involvement in The Matrix sequels and now that the movies were complete they decided to abandon the project of their own volition because of the frequent clashes they had experienced with Milius concerning the tone and direction of the movie. Lana once suggested Conan the Barbarian as her favorite movie based on comics, to which Lilly also responded enthusiastically.

In 2008, the Wachowskis were producing for Madhouse an animated film based on their comic book company's Shaolin Cowboy, titled Shaolin Cowboy in The Tomb of Doom. The feature is co-directed by the comic book's creator Geof Darrow and Seiji Mizushima, a Japanese director. When the American financiers backed out, the film was left half-finished and in need of $3 million. Darrow does not believe that the required amount of money to finish it will be found.

In December 2009, Arianna Huffington tweeted pictures of herself on the set of "a Wachowskis movie on Iraq from the perspective of the future". CHUD.com reported what the Wachowskis were doing was camera tests and shooting of test footage on the Red digital camera for a future movie, but not shooting the movie itself. In March 2010, Jesse Ventura said he had also shot for the project right before Huffington. Both of them were dressed as people from roughly 100 years in the future and they were asked to improvise without a script about the Iraq War. In May 2010, Deadline reported the movie was going to be a hard-R story that would begin in the future but move back to the then-current war in Iraq and center on the homosexual relationship between an American soldier and an Iraqi. The Wachowskis completed the script and were searching for funding to direct it. In July 2010, the movie was reported to have begun casting under the codename CN9 (or CN-9), and in August 2010 the full name was revealed as Cobalt Neural 9. In September 2010, Vulture posted additional details about the script and revealed the movie would be told in found footage-style from the perspective of digital archaeologists from the future. An estimated $20 million budget was reported although they were told a studio would "never, ever" finance it but perhaps the Wachowskis could do it themselves. In December 2010, The Hollywood Reporter wrote that Salman Rushdie and Cornel West had also shot talking head sequences along with the previously reported involvement of Huffington and Ventura but the Wachowskis were looking into other movies because of troubles financing it. In September 2012, Aleksandar Hemon wrote about the making of Cloud Atlas and recalled he too was one of the people the Wachowskis had invited to interview in December 2009, to help inspire the script of Cobalt Neural 9. The last update on the film was in October 2012, when the Wachowskis were asked about it and they responded they were still keen to make it, because they had invested both financially ($5 million) and emotionally into it, even if that ends up being in a different form than film.

In December 2010, The Hollywood Reporter wrote that the Wachowskis were planning to direct for Warner Bros. a script of theirs called Hood, which was a modern adaptation of the Robin Hood legend. The Wachowskis were said to be reaching out to actors, including Will Smith.

== Personal lives ==
Lilly married Alicia Blasingame in 1991. In 2016, Lilly mentioned having a boyfriend. In 2019, she said Mickey Ray Mahoney was now her partner and that they had moved in together. Mahoney is an adjunct professor at the School of the Art Institute of Chicago and a trans man.

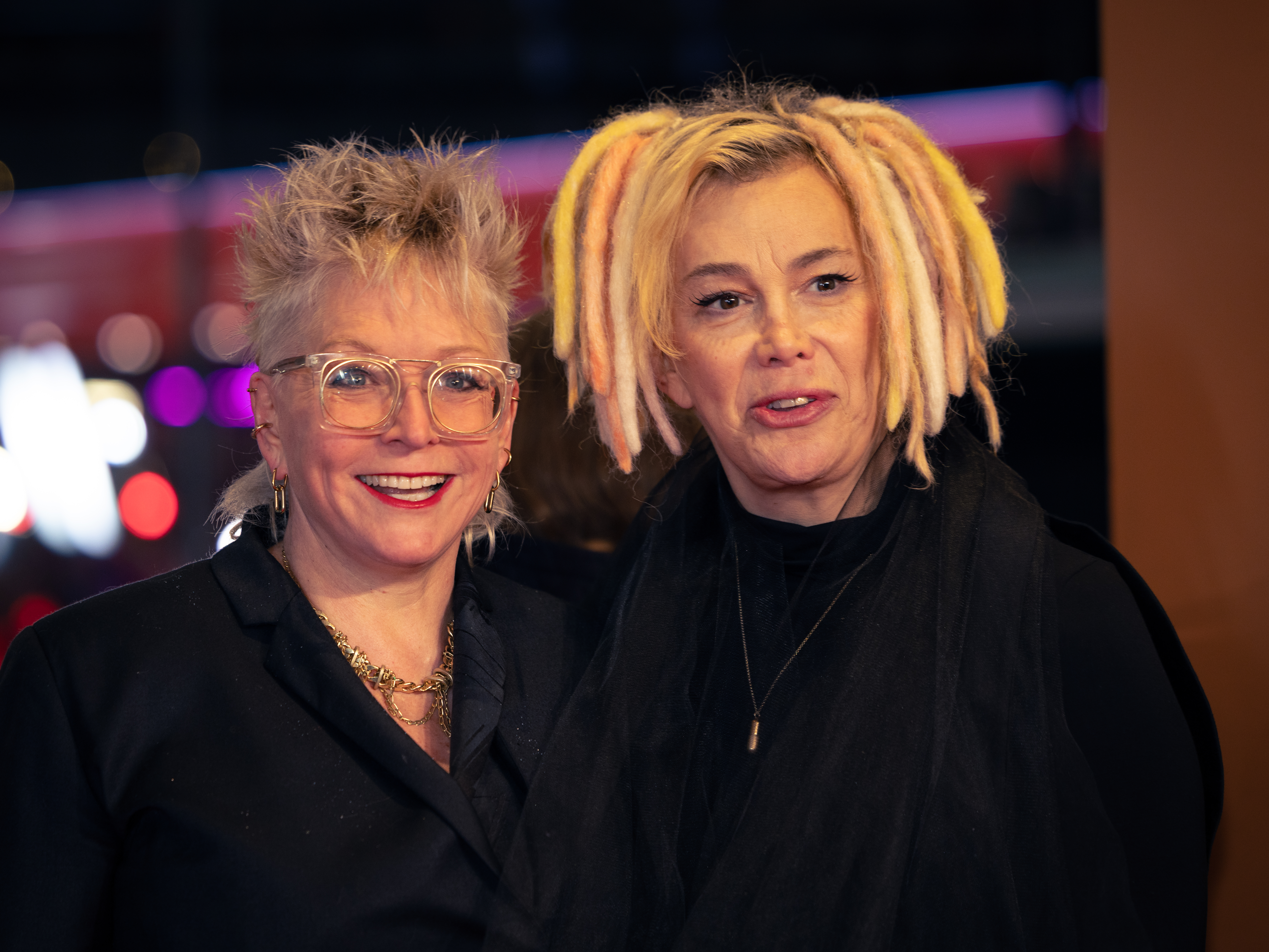
Karin Winslow and Lana in 2025

Lana married Thea Bloom in 1993. Following the release of The Matrix, Lana began attending the Los Angeles BDSM club The Dungeon, where she met Karin Winslow, who worked there as a dominatrix under the name Ilsa Strix. Bloom divorced Lana in 2002 after discovering the relationship. Lana and Karin made their first public appearance together at the premiere of The Matrix Reloaded in 2003, and married in 2009. Winslow is a board member of the Chicago House and Social Service Agency.

Raised by a "hardcore atheist" father and an "ex-Catholic turned Shamanist" mother, the duo once described their religious beliefs as non-denominational. Lana is a vegetarian. During the Democratic Party presidential primaries of 2016, The Advocate posted a video message of Lana talking about why she would be supporting Bernie Sanders.

=== Lana's transition ===
Rumors that Lana Wachowski was transitioning spread in the early 2000s, though neither sister spoke directly on the subject at the time. In 2003, Gothamist reported the possible transition. In a 2007 interview, Joel Silver, the producer of numerous Wachowski films, said that the rumors concerning the transition were "all untrue", saying that "they just don't do interviews, so people make things up." Crew members working on Speed Racer said similar things.

Lana publicly revealed her transition after Speed Racer's release in 2008 and by at least December 2010, after which trade magazines and newspapers began to refer to her as "Lana Wachowski", and to the duo as "Andy and Lana Wachowski". On some documents her name is shown as Laurenca Wachowski. In July 2012, Lana made her first public appearance after transitioning, in a video discussing the creative process behind Cloud Atlas. Lana is the first major Hollywood director to come out as transgender.

In a September 2012 interview with Aleksandar Hemon of The New Yorker, Lana described an incident in third grade at her Catholic school where she was hesitant to join the boys' line and unconsciously accepted herself as belonging to the girls' line.

In October 2012, Lana Wachowski received the Human Rights Campaign's Visibility Award. In her acceptance speech, she revealed that once during her youth, she had considered suicide because of her feelings of confusion about her gender identity. Her acceptance speech was one of the longest public appearances by either of the reclusive sisters. Lana said that, although she and Lilly had not publicly commented on her transitioning during the previous decade, it was not because she was ashamed of it, nor had she kept it a secret from her family and friends. Rather, she stated, the two are generally shy about the news media and prefer to maintain their privacy. Comparing media exposure to losing one's virginity as an irreversible event that only happens once, the Wachowskis had tried to stay out of the public eye. They feared losing their privacy and the ability to go to public places without being noticed and harassed as celebrities.

Explaining her decision to appear at the HRC event, Lana said:

There are some things we do for ourselves, but there are some things we do for others. I am here because when I was young, I wanted very badly to be a writer, I wanted to be a filmmaker, but I couldn't find anyone like me in the world and it felt like my dreams were foreclosed simply because my gender was less typical than others. If I can be that person for someone else, then the sacrifice of my private civic life may have value.

In February 2014, Lana received the Freedom Award from Equality Illinois at their annual gala in Chicago. (Note: Attributed to multiple references:)

=== Lilly's transition ===
In March 2016, Lilly Wachowski also came out as a transgender woman, issuing a statement to the Windy City Times after a visit from a Daily Mail reporter who had attempted to get an interview with her about it. (Note: Attributed to multiple references:) In that article, she said, "I am one of the lucky ones. Having the support of my family and the means to afford doctors and therapists has given me the chance to actually survive this process. Transgender people without support, means and privilege do not have this luxury. And many do not survive."

Her first public appearance since beginning transitioning was a few weeks later, at the 27th GLAAD Media Awards, where she accepted an award for her Netflix series Sense8 for Outstanding Drama Series. She said, "I didn't feel obligated to be here, but I wanted to do something. And it's serendipitous that the awards were a couple of weeks later and our show was up for an award."

== Gaming ==
The Wachowskis are self-proclaimed gamers. As teens, they spent their weekends in the attic playing Dungeons & Dragons. They liken the process of their gaming sessions to their process of filmmaking. Along with some of their friends, they wrote a 350-page role-playing game of their own called High Adventure.

On the video game front, they had been exchanging letters with Hideo Kojima and met him during a Famitsu interview in late 1999. Metal Gear Solid was the first video game they played after finishing work on The Matrix. Candidates for an adaptation of the first Matrix movie to video game form included Kojima, Bungie and Shiny Entertainment, whose Messiah PC game impressed them. Shiny's David Perry, who ultimately had his company develop and collaborate with them on the Enter the Matrix and The Matrix: Path of Neo video games, was impressed with their familiarity with the medium; this proved helpful during development. The Wachowskis owned both a PlayStation 2 and Xbox video game console and played several games such as Splinter Cell and Halo 2. They reportedly destroyed their Xbox during a Halo deathmatch. Actor Collin Chou recounts an instance of visiting their office and finding them playing video games on the floor. Lilly is a fan of the Death Jr. PlayStation Portable game.

Asked about their feelings about turning the tightly controlled Matrix saga to the unpredictable form of an MMORPG with The Matrix Online, the duo appeared enthusiastic about the nature and possibilities of video games:

The "vagaries of an MMO where unpredictable player behavior is the rule," is the reason for doing it. Our films were never intended for a passive audience. There are enough of those kinds of films being made. We wanted our audience to have to work, to have to think, to have to actually participate to enjoy them. This may be because while we enjoy movies, we also spend a lot of time (as in crack-den amounts of time) gaming.

Gaming engages your mind actively whereas most genre films (the films we tend to watch) are designed to provoke as little thinking as possible. Consider why the films in which everyone knows exactly what is going to happen are the films that make the most money.

Yet the fact that The Matrix films are three of the most successful adult films in history (despite of what much of the media would have us believe), suggests that there are other people like us. Those are the people, the people who thought about it, who worked at it, who we ultimately made the trilogy for and it now makes perfect sense to us that they should inherit the storyline. For us, the idea of watching our baby evolve inside the virtual bubble-world of this new radically developing medium, which has in our opinion the potential of combining the best attributes of films and games, of synthesizing reality TV with soap opera, RPGs and [Mortal Kombat], is fantastically exciting.

— The Wachowskis

== Box office ==
Year	Title	Budget	Box office
1995	Assassins	$50 million	$83.3 million
1996	Bound	$6 million	$7 million
1999	The Matrix	$63 million	$463.5 million
2003	The Matrix Reloaded	$150 million	$742.1 million
2003	The Matrix Revolutions	$150 million	$427.3 million
2005	V for Vendetta	$54 million	$132.5 million
2007	The Invasion	$65–85 million	$40.2 million
2008	Speed Racer	$120 million	$93.9 million
2012	Cloud Atlas	$146.7 million	$130.5 million
2015	Jupiter Ascending	$176 million	$184 million
2021	The Matrix Resurrections	$190 million	$156.6 million

== Awards and nominations ==
Year	Award	Category	Title	Result
1997	Deauville American Film Festival	Grand Special Prize	Bound	Nominated
1997	Fantasporto	Best Film	Bound	Won
1997	Outfest	Grand Jury Award – Honorable Mention: Outstanding American Narrative Feature	Bound	Won
1997	Saturn Awards	Best Writing	Bound	Nominated
1997	Stockholm Film Festival	Honorable Mention	Bound	Won
2000	Amanda Awards	Best Foreign Feature Film	The Matrix	Nominated
2000	Hugo Awards	Best Dramatic Presentation, Long Form	The Matrix	Nominated
2000	Mainichi Film Concours	Readers' Choice Award for Best Foreign Language Film	The Matrix	Won
2000	Nebula Awards	Best Script	The Matrix	Nominated
2000	Saturn Awards	Best Director	The Matrix	Won
2000	Saturn Awards	Best Writing	The Matrix	Nominated
2004	Golden Raspberry Awards	Worst Director	The Matrix Reloaded and The Matrix Revolutions	Nominated
2007	Hugo Awards	Best Dramatic Presentation, Long Form	V for Vendetta	Nominated
2007	Nebula Awards	Best Script	V for Vendetta	Nominated
2007	Saturn Awards	Best Writing	V for Vendetta	Nominated
2012	Online Film Critics Society Awards	Best Adapted Screenplay (shared with Tom Tykwer)	Cloud Atlas	Nominated
2013	German Film Award	Best Fiction Film (shared with Grant Hill, Stefan Arndt and Tom Tykwer)	Cloud Atlas	Nominated
2013	German Film Award	Best Director (shared with Tom Tykwer)	Cloud Atlas	Nominated
2016	Golden Raspberry Awards	Worst Director	Jupiter Ascending	Nominated
2016	Golden Raspberry Awards	Worst Screenplay	Jupiter Ascending	Nominated

== Works ==
=== Films ===
Year	Title	Functioned as			Notes
Year	Title	Directors	Writers	Producers	Notes
1995	Assassins	No	Yes	No	
1996	Bound	Yes	Yes	Executive	
1999	The Matrix	Yes	Yes	Executive	
2001	The Matrix Revisited	No	No	Executive	Documentary
2003	The Animatrix	No	Yes	Yes	Direct-to-video; Wrote: "Final Flight of the Osiris"; Story by: "The Second Renaissance Part I & II" and "Kid's Story"
2003	The Matrix Reloaded	Yes	Yes	Executive	
2003	The Matrix Revolutions	Yes	Yes	Executive	
2005	V for Vendetta	No	Yes	Yes	Second unit directors (uncredited)
2007	The Invasion	No	Uncredited	No	Rewrites
2008	Speed Racer	Yes	Yes	Yes	
2009	Ninja Assassin	No	No	Yes	
2012	Cloud Atlas	Yes	Yes	Yes	Co-directed with Tom Tykwer
2014	Google Me Love	No	No	Executive	Short film
2015	Jupiter Ascending	Yes	Yes	Yes	
2021	The Matrix Resurrections	Lana	Lana	Lana	
2025	Castration Movie Anthology ii. The Best of Both Worlds	No	No	Executive; Lilly	
2025	Dolls	No	No	Executive; Lilly	Short film
2026	Again Again	No	No	Executive; Lilly	
2026	Castration Movie Anthology iii: Junior Ghosts - Premorphic Drift, a Fragmentary Passage	No	No	Executive; Lilly	
2026	Trash Mountain	No	No	Executive; Lilly	

=== Television ===
Year	Title	Functioned as				Notes
Year	Title	Creators	Showrunners	Writers	Directors	Notes
2015–2018	Sense8	Yes	Season 1: The Wachowskis; Season 2: Lana only	Season 1: The Wachowskis; Season 2: Lana only	Season 1: The Wachowskis; Season 2: Lana only	Co-created with J. Michael Straczynski
2019–2021	Work in Progress	No	Lilly	Lilly	Lilly	Episodes: "Oh Say Can You See" and "I Release You"

=== Video games ===
Year	Title	Functioned as		Notes
Year	Title	Directors	Writers	Notes
2003	Enter the Matrix	Yes	Yes	
2005	The Matrix Online	Yes	No	
2005	The Matrix: Path of Neo	Yes	Yes	
2021	The Matrix Awakens	Lana	Lana	

=== Comic books ===
Year	Title	Functioned as		Notes
Year	Title	Writers	Publishers	Notes
1989–1994	Clive Barker's Hellraiser	Lana only		Issues: 8–9, 12–13 and Hellraiser: Spring Slaughter – Razing Hell
1992	Clive Barker's Nightbreed	Lana only		Issue: 17
1993	Clive Barker's Book of the Damned	Lana only		Volumes: 1–2 and 4.
1993–1994	Ectokid	Lana only		Issues: 3–9
1999–2004	The Matrix Comics	Yes	Yes	Written "Bits and Pieces of Information"
2004–2007, 2019	Doc Frankenstein	Yes	Yes	
2004–2007	Shaolin Cowboy	Recap only	Yes	

=== Music videos ===
Year	Title	Artist	Notes
2009	"Epilepsy Is Dancing"	Antony and the Johnsons	

=== Miscellanea ===
The Art of the Matrix book credits them for including their screenplay and additional art. The Wachowskis also wrote an introduction to the 2005 published Vol. 2: Tag trade paperback of Ex Machina comic book, being big fans of it. Additionally Lana Wachowski wrote the introduction to the 2012 published No Straight Lines: Four Decades of Queer Comics collection of LGBTQ comic book stories.

Additionally classifying themselves as "lifelong rabid Bulls fans" they created a revamped introductory animation for Chicago Bulls to open the 2006–2007 regular season.

== See also ==
- List of transgender film and television directors
