= Steve Skroce =

Canadian comic book and film storyboard artist

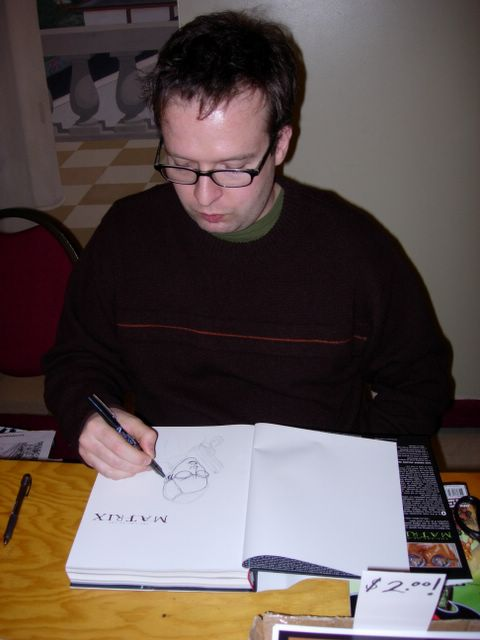
- Born: Canada
- Area: Cartoonist

Steve Skroce (/ˈskroʊsi/) (born April 7, 1973 in Canada) is a Canadian comic book and film storyboard artist. He is of Croatian descent.

== Biography ==
Skroce broke into comics in 1993 on the Clive Barker-created series Ectokid for Marvel Comics' Razorline imprint. He went to work on the Marvel series Cable and X-Man before moving onto The Amazing Spider-Man in 1996. He briefly worked on Rob Liefeld's Youngblood comics, and returned to Marvel Comics to pencil Gambit.

Having worked with authors Lana and Lilly Wachowski on Ectokid, Skroce was contacted to create storyboards for The Matrix, which were used by the writing-producing-directing Wachowskis team to help pitch their movie to Warner Bros.

Skroce briefly returned to Marvel in 2000 to write and pencil four issues of Wolverine (#150-153) before drawing storyboards for the rest of the Matrix Trilogy. Skroce often works on movies with the Wachowskis, and has done storyboards for I, Robot (2004), V for Vendetta (2005), Speed Racer (2008), Ninja Assassin (2009), Cloud Atlas (2012), and Jupiter Ascending (2015).

In 2004, he co-created (along with comic book artist Geof Darrow) and draws Doc Frankenstein for Burlyman Entertainment, which is written by The Wachowskis.

With Brian K. Vaughan in 2015, Skroce was the co-creator and artist of the Image Comics science fiction series We Stand On Guard.

In 2017, Skroce wrote and drew Maestros, which is published by Image Comics. In 2026, Image and Skybound announced he was writing and drawing the limited series Tales of Wonder, about two comics creators whose characters unexpectedly come to life.

Preceded by Mark Bagley	The Amazing Spider-Man artist 1996 – 1997	Succeeded by Joe Bennett
Preceded by Erik Larsen	Wolverine writer 2000	Succeeded by Rob Liefeld
