= The Big Guy and Rusty the Boy Robot =

1995 comic book miniseries

- Cover art by Geof Darrow.

Publication information
- Publisher: Legend (Dark Horse Comics)
- Format: Limited series
- Genre: Science fiction
- Publication date: July – August 1995
- No. of issues: 2

Creative team
- Written by: Frank Miller
- Artist: Geof Darrow

The Big Guy and Rusty the Boy Robot is a 1995 comic book written by Frank Miller, drawn by Geof Darrow and published by Dark Horse Comics. The comic book was adapted into an animated TV series of the same name.

== Overview ==
After appearing in various comic book pin-up and poster pages, the Big Guy first appeared without Rusty in issues #6 and 7 of Mike Allred's Madman Comics, which was part of Dark Horse Comics' now defunct Legend imprint.

The property graduated to its own series, a large format two-issue mini-series in 1995, written by Frank Miller and illustrated by Geof Darrow. The story revolves around an attack on Tokyo by a giant reptilian creature that is originated in an experiment gone wrong, and the failure of the newly commissioned Rusty the Boy Robot to stop the threat. Subsequently, Japan requested help from the U.S. Armed Forces, whose ultimate defense, the robot Big Guy, launches from his air carrier base and uses his awesome arsenal and good old-fashioned American know-how to save the day.

Big Guy also makes an appearance in Frank Miller and Dave Gibbons' Martha Washington Stranded in Space and cameo appearances in the last Sin City book, Sin City: Hell and Back.

== Adaptation ==
A two-season television adaptation, featuring the voices of Pamela Segall, Jonathan David Cook, Gabrielle Carteris, Stephen Root, Kathy Kinney, Kevin Michael Richardson, M. Emmet Walsh, and R. Lee Ermey, aired on the Fox Kids Network for 26 episodes from September 18, 1999 to March 5, 2001.
