= Geof Darrow =

American comic artist (born 1955)

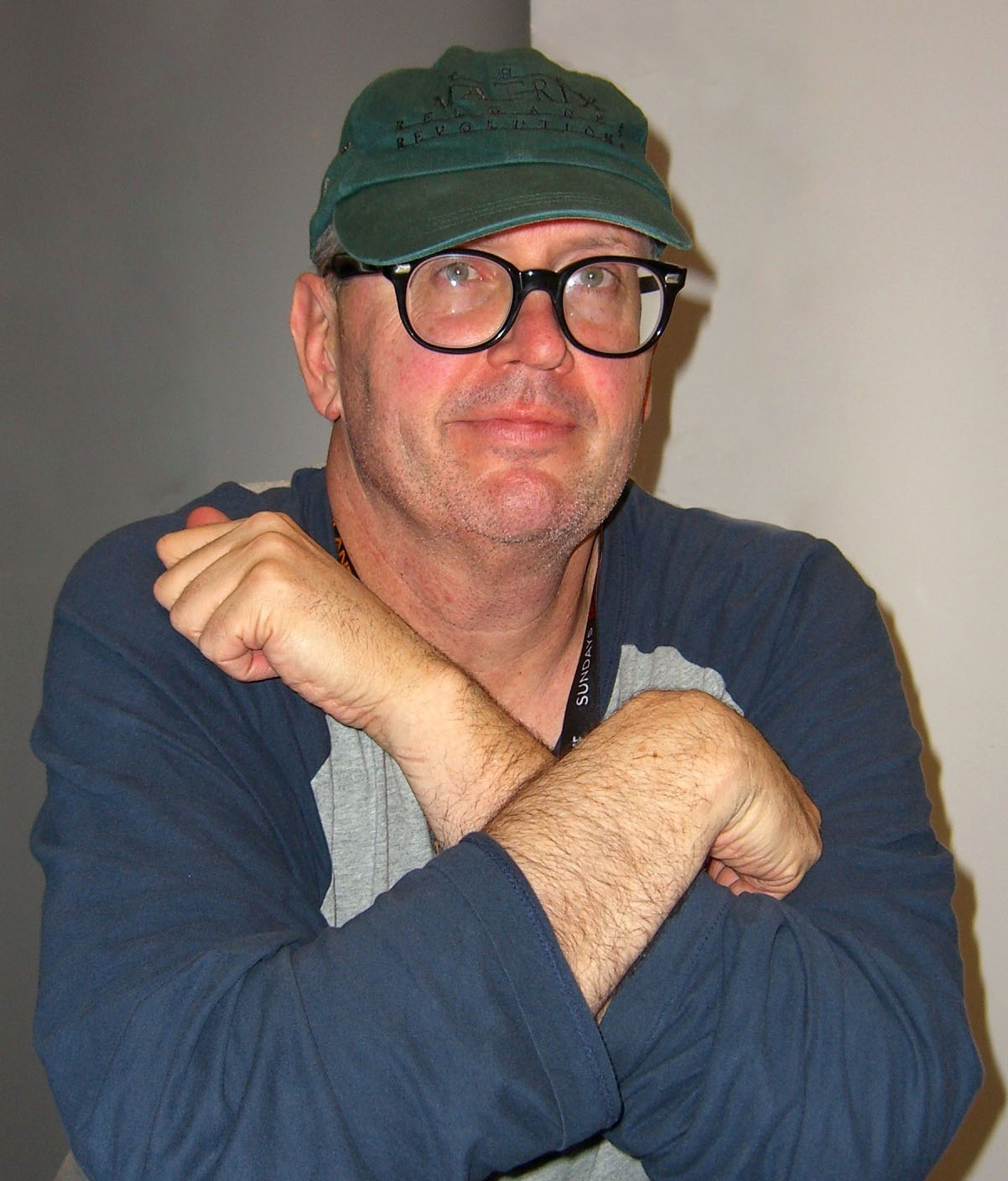
- Darrow at the 2011 New York Comic Con
- Born: Geofrey Darrow; October 21, 1955 (age 71) Cedar Rapids, Iowa, U.S.
- Areas: Writer, Penciller, Inker
- Notable works: Hard Boiled, The Big Guy and Rusty the Boy Robot, Shaolin Cowboy
- Awards: Eisner Awards (1991, 1996, 2006); Inkpot Award (2012)

Geofrey "Geof" Darrow (born October 21, 1955) is an American comic book artist, best known for his work on comic series Shaolin Cowboy, Hard Boiled and The Big Guy and Rusty the Boy Robot, which was adapted into an animated television series of the same name. He worked as a concept artist and storyboarder for The Matrix series of films. Darrow's approach to comics and art has been cited as an influence by a multitude of artists including Peter Chung, Frank Quitely, Seth Fisher, Eric Powell, Frank Cho, Juan José Ryp, James Stokoe, Chris Burnham, Aaron Kuder, Nick Pitarra,

== Early life ==
Geofrey Darrow was born on October 21, 1955, in Cedar Rapids, Iowa. He attended a Catholic school for thirteen years. Darrow read comics, mostly DC, from an early age, but he only decided to pursue a career in illustration after first seeing Jack Kirby's work in Fantastic Four Annual #3. As a teenager, he encountered Maurice Horn's The World Encyclopedia of Comics, which contained excerpts from Lieutenant Blueberry illustrated by Jean Giraud, whose art further affected his outlook on comics. Darrow sought out all available Blueberry volumes, gradually moving to other European works, such as Jean-Claude Mézières' Valérian and Greg and Hermann's Bernard Prince.

== Career ==
After graduating from Chicago Academy of Fine Arts, Darrow worked as a freelance illustrator for various advertising agencies. In the late 1970s, he moved to Los Angeles and joined Hanna-Barbera, where he worked as a character designer on a number of cartoon series, including Super Friends in its various incarnations. During his time in animation, Darrow became acquainted with such comic and animation industry figures as Jack Kirby, Alex Toth, Tex Avery and Dave Stevens. In 1982, Darrow met French comic book creator and his artistic idol Mœbius, who was staying in Los Angeles while working on Tron for Disney. Upon learning that Darrow was an artist interested in creating comics, Mœbius arranged a meeting for him with Les Humanoïdes Associés, the publisher of French science fiction anthology Métal Hurlant, and offered to collaborate on some sort of project. Eventually, Darrow moved to France to be able to work with Giraud more closely as the two were planning to produce a comic strip written by Mœbius and drawn by Darrow, but Giraud had left France for Tahiti two weeks after Darrow's arrival. Despite that, they were able to produce an art portfolio titled La Cité Feu, penciled by Darrow, inked and colored by Mœbius, published in 1984 by Éditions Ædena. The meeting with Les Humanoïdes Associés resulted in Darrow's first published comics work which was also the debut of his character Bourbon Thret. The following year, the story was reprinted in Geof Darrow Comics and Stories along with a new one, also starring Bourbon Thret, and several pin-ups colored by Mœbius, Tanino Liberatore and François Boucq. The volume was also released as a limited edition accompanied by Darrow Magazine, which mostly consisted of illustrated private jokes from various French comic artists. Mistaking the Magazine for an actual periodical publication, a number of artists contacted Darrow and sent him their portfolios in hopes of doing artwork for the magazine.

During one of their stays in Los Angeles, Mœbius introduced Darrow to Frank Miller, which led to a friendship and a number of comics collaborations. Darrow, Miller and Steve Gerber started developing a Superman series as part of the Metropolis proposal, then after the idea fell through, Miller offered Darrow to work on a Daredevil story he was writing that would delve into the character's origin. Eventually, Miller realized he didn't want to be the person to bring Darrow into the world of Big Two work-for-hire, and the two focused on developing their own story. As Darrow had never worked with a writer before, he often strayed from the script, prompting Miller to make a number of significant changes to the story. Between 1990 and 1992, Dark Horse published the three-issue mini-series titled Hard Boiled, which earned Miller and Darrow the 1991 Eisner Award in the "Best Writer/Artist Team" category. After Hard Boiled, Darrow wanted to do a superhero story, specifically, an Iron Man story, although Marvel wasn't interested. Miller and Darrow started developing the concept into their next project, The Big Guy and Rusty the Boy Robot. This time, they worked in the so-called "Marvel style": Miller wrote a few paragraphs describing the general plot, from which Darrow drew the eighty-page story, which Miller then wrote the dialogue over. Between 1993 and the series' first issue, released in 1995, the characters of Big Guy and Rusty appeared in a number of Darrow-illustrated posters and pin-ups, occasionally crossing over with other creator-owned characters such as Spawn and Ash. In 1994, Dark Horse started a new imprint titled Legend, spear-headed by Frank Miller and John Byrne and encompassing works by various creators including Art Adams, Mike Mignola and Darrow. The Big Guy and Rusty the Boy Robot was published in two issues in 1995 and 1996 under the Legend imprint. Between the release of the first and the second issues, the characters also appeared in two issues of Mike Allred's Madman, which was also published under the Legend imprint at the time. The comic book was later adapted into a 26-episode animated series of the same name, produced by Columbia TriStar Television and Dark Horse Entertainment, airing for two seasons from 1999 to 2001.

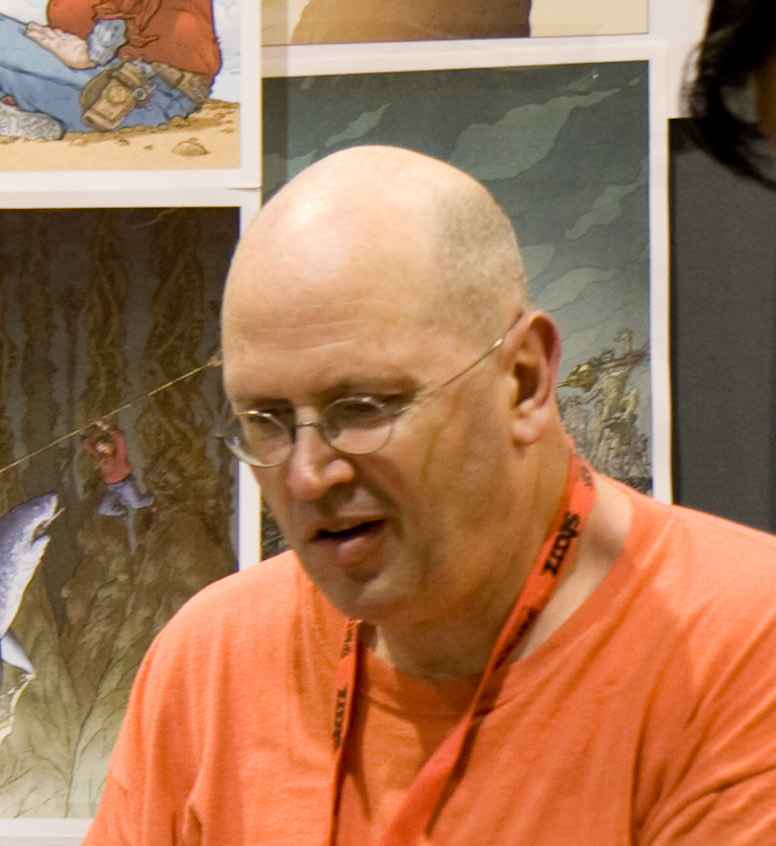
Geof Darrow at SDCC 2009.

After finishing Big Guy and Rusty, Darrow decided to return to his Bourbon Thret character but felt he needed to "adapt" him for the American audience.

I've always liked the character, and I wanted to do it again, but I thought "well, that's an odd name. No one in the United States will like it, it's just too odd. What can I call him?" I like Westerns and I like martial arts movies, so it's like taking a page from the Teenage Mutant Ninja Turtles. It's an odd two things to put together, so that's what I decided to call him. Shaolin Cowboy instead of Bourbon Thret. <...> I told Frank Miller I wanted to do something like a western, and Frank says "whatever you do, don't put cowboy in the title! That doesn't sell!" So of course I followed his advice.

Meanwhile, relative unknowns the Wachowskis (having only directed the 1996 film Bound, as a low budget "audition piece"), impressed by Darrow's art for Hard Boiled, wanted to work with him on their production for The Matrix. Warner Bros. contacted Darrow, and after reading the script he agreed to work on the film. Wachowskis also brought comic book artist Steve Skroce from their short stint on Epic Comics' Ectokid, and the two proceeded to work on the concepts and storyboards which, when finished, played a pivotal role in getting the movie greenlit and financed. The Wachowskis later brought in Darrow as the conceptual designer on Speed Racer, although his contributions were significantly smaller compared to The Matrix trilogy. In 1999, shortly after the release of the first Matrix film, the Wachowskis announced they'll be working on an animated adaptation of Hard Boiled but the project was cancelled due to Miller not wanting to see his creation as an animated film. In 2019, Warner Bros. announced that Darrow and Skroce would be returning as storyboard artists and concept designers for the production of the fourth installment of The Matrix.

After finishing work on The Matrix trilogy, the Wachowskis set up a publishing house, Burlyman Entertainment, for which Darrow provided the logo illustration. Burlyman's output consisted of two paperbacks of The Matrix Comics collecting the short comic stories from The Matrix website, as well as seven issues of Darrow's Shaolin Cowboy, published between 2005 and 2007, and six issues of Doc Frankenstein, a Wachowskis-written and Skroce-drawn series originating from a concept developed by Darrow, which he described as "Doc Savage meets Citizen Kane".

In 2009, it was announced that the Wachowskis and Circle of Confusion were producing an animated feature of Shaolin Cowboy, subtitled Tomb of Doom, written and co-directed by Darrow, and animated by Madhouse. Darrow spent a year living in Japan and working on the production which was halted after the American financiers, The Weinstein Company, backed out. Around half of the footage was finished, and some of the completed scenes and pencil tests were shown at San Diego Comic Con in 2012 and Chicago Comic & Entertainment Expo in 2015. The film was supposed to feature a sequence animated by Masaaki Yuasa. In 2012, Shaolin Cowboy resumed publication at Dark Horse with a 96-page book stylized as a pulp magazine containing a Shaolin Cowboy prose story written by Andrew Vachss (with whom Darrow has had a working relationship dating back to the early 90s) with spot illustrations by Darrow, a prose story by Michael A. Black with spot illustrations by Gary Gianni and one-page strips written and drawn by Darrow. The book was followed by The Shaolin Cowboy, a four-issue mini-series subtitled Shemp Buffet for the collected edition, and The Shaolin Cowboy: Who Will Stop the Reign?, another four-issue mini-series, which incorporated some the visual ideas from the unfinished animated feature.

In 2015, DC Comics announced Darrow as the artist for the supplemental mini-comic to the third issue of Frank Miller and Brian Azzarello's The Dark Knight III: The Master Race, as well as the variant covers for issues 3 and 4, though none of his contributions were ultimately realized. Meanwhile, Dark Horse issued a press release announcing the first English-language collection of the Bourbon Thret strips, to be partially re-colored by Dave Stewart. Since then, Dark Horse has re-released Hard Boiled and The Big Guy and Risty the Boy Robot with new coloring by Stewart as well as the entirety of Shaolin Cowboy in a uniform format. As of 2019, the Bourbon Thret collection still hasn't been released.

Over the course of his career, Darrow has contributed storyboards and conceptual designs for a number film productions, many of which ended up cancelled, including J. J. Abrams' Superman: Flyby, an animated feature by Ridley Scott, one of Hollywood's attempts at adapting Akira and Alex Proyas' adaptation of Paradise Lost. Outside of comics and film, Darrow has contributed artwork to a number of trading card series, including Magic: The Gathering, Star Wars Galaxy, Witchblade, The Shadow and Madman, as well as promotional posters, CD covers and role-playing games. Darrow also serves on the national advisory board of PROTECT: The National Association to Protect Children.

== Awards ==
- 1991: Will Eisner Comic Industry Awards – Nominee – Best Artist (for Hard Boiled - Dark Horse)
- 1991: Will Eisner Comic Industry Awards – Winner – Best Writer/Artist or Writer/Artist Team (with Frank Miller, for Hard Boiled - Dark Horse)
- 1996: Will Eisner Comic Industry Awards – Winner – Best Penciller/Inker (for The Big Guy and Rusty the Boy Robot - Dark Horse/Legend)
- 2005: Will Eisner Comic Industry Awards – Nominee – Best Best Penciller/Inker or Penciller/Inker Team (for Shaolin Cowboy - Burlyman Entertainment)
- 2005: Will Eisner Comic Industry Awards – Nominee – Best New Series (for Shaolin Cowboy - Burlyman Entertainment)
- 2006: Will Eisner Comic Industry Awards – Winner – Best Writer/Artist (for Shaolin Cowboy - Burlyman Entertainment)
- 2012: PROTECT Messenger Award
- 2012: Inkpot Award

== Influences ==
Darrow has stated in interviews that he considers Jack Kirby, Hergé, Mœbius (to whom he dedicated The Shaolin Cowboy: Who Will Stop the Reign?), Jean-Claude Mézières, Hermann, François Boucq, Osamu Tezuka, Katsuhiro Otomo, Sanpei Shirato, Vaughn Bode, Jack Davis, Richard Corben, as well as the films of Anthony Mann as his artistic influences. Shaolin Cowboy in particular was inspired by the television series Kung Fu, Akira Kurosawa's Yojimbo and Shintaro Katsu's portrayal of Zatoichi.

== Filmography ==
=== Film ===
Year	Film	Conceptual designer	Storyboard artist	Notes
1992	Josette au Beret	No	No	Extra, credited as "Motorcycle Man"
1996	Barb Wire	No	No	Visual consultant
1999	The Matrix	Yes	Yes	With Steve Skroce
2003	The Matrix Reloaded	Yes	Yes	With Steve Skroce
2003	The Matrix Revolutions	Yes	Yes	With Steve Skroce
2008	Speed Racer	Yes	No	
2008	The Spirit	No	No	The Spirit butcher diagram
2021	The Matrix Resurrections	Yes	Yes	With Steve Skroce

=== Television ===
Darrow contributed character designs to a number of Hanna-Barbera cartoon shows:

- Super Friends (1981–1983)
  - Super Friends: The Legendary Super Powers Show (1984)
  - The Super Powers Team: Galactic Guardians (1985)
- Richie Rich (1982)
- Pac-Man (1983)
- The Biskitts (1983)
- Pink Panther and Sons (1984)

He's also credited as "model designer" for CBS' Garbage Pail Kids (1987) and "monster designer" for the adaptation of The Big Guy and Rusty the Boy Robot (1999–2001).

== Bibliography ==
=== Early work ===
- La Cité Feu (eight-plate full-color portfolio created in collaboration with Mœbius, Ædena, 1984)
- Métal Hurlant #101: "Bourbon Thret: Terreur Paroissiale" (w/a, anthology, Les Humanoïdes Associés, 1984)
  - A colorized version of the story with rearranged layouts was reprinted in English as "Bourbon Thret: Parochial Terror" in Heavy Metal vol. 8 #12 (1985)
  - A recolored version of the story with the Heavy Metal layouts was reprinted in French as "La Paroisse Infernale" in Geof Darrow Comics and Stories (1986)
- L'Univers de Gir: "Hommage à Gir" (black-and-white illustration for an interview with Mœbius conducted by Darrow, 94 pages, Dargaud, 1986, ISBN 2-205-02945-2)
- La bande à Renaud: "Au pays des Gavroches" (two-page full-color illustration, anthology graphic novel, 44 pages, Dargaud, 1986, ISBN 2-906187-01-1)
- Airboy vol. 2 #12: "I Don't Need My Grave, Part Two" (inks on Bill Jaaska, written by Chuck Dixon, co-feature, Eclipse, 1986)
- East Meets West (ten-plate full-color portfolio story about the adventures of Bourbon Thret and Clint Eastwood, Ædena, 1986)
- Geof Darrow Comics and Stories (w/a, full-color, 55 pages, Ædena, 1986, ISBN 2-905035-34-X)
  - Contains a new Bourbon Thret story, "Les Requins aussi aiment le Cola-Cola", and several pin-ups.
  - Reprinted by Dargaud under the Neopolis imprint as Bourbon Thret (45 pages, 1995, ISBN 2-84055-053-9)
- Les Magiciens d'eau: "Sead" (w/a, anthology graphic novel, 44 pages, Bandes Originales, 1987, ISBN 2-907132-00-8)
  - A black-and-white version of the story with rearranged layouts was reprinted in Dark Horse Presents #19 (Dark Horse, 1988)
  - Original version of the story was reprinted in black and white in Crisis Presents #3: Second Xpresso Special (Fleetway, 1991)
- Strip AIDS U.S.A.: "Untitled" (w/a, one-page story, anthology graphic novel, 140 pages, Last Gasp, 1988, ISBN 0-86719-373-5)
- Pilote et Charlie #27: "Un Américain à Paris" (two-page full-color illustration for an article, anthology, Dargaud, 1988)
- The Rocketeer Adventure Magazine #2–3 (uncredited art assist to Dave Stevens, Comico, 1988; Dark Horse, 1995)

=== Dark Horse Comics ===
- Cheval Noir (black-and-white anthology, 1989–1991):
  - Title page illustrations in #1–2, 4, 6, 9–10, 12 and 14.
  - Back cover illustrations in #1–6, 8–9, 11, 13–15, 17 and 18.
  - Table of Contents illustrations in #1–2, 4–5, 7–8, 11, 13, 16–17 and 19.
  - Humorous one-page stories about Darrow's career (written and illustrated by Darrow) in #3 and 4.
- The Godzilla Portfolio #2 (one black-and-white plate reproducing a pin-up from Geof Darrow Comics and Stories, 1989)
- Hard Boiled #1–3 (a, with Frank Miller, 1990–1992) collected as Hard Boiled (tpb, 128 pages, 1993, ISBN 1-878574-58-2, hc, 144 pages, 1993, ISBN 1-56971-049-X)
  - An unlettered and uncolored version of the story was released in an oversized edition titled Big Damn Hard Boiled (tpb, 128 pages, 1998, ISBN 1-56971-323-5)
  - A recolored version of the story was released as part of a series of Darrow reprints (hc, 136 pages, 2017, ISBN 1-5067-0107-8)
- Another Chance to Get It Right (black-and-white illustrations for the novella written by Andrew Vachss, among other artists):
  - 18-page sequence in the first edition of the book (sc, 64 pages, 1992, ISBN 1-56971-115-1, hc, 1993, ISBN 1-878574-35-3)
  - Additional 4 full-page illustrations for the third edition (sc, 88 pages, 2003, ISBN 1-56971-832-6)
- Hard Looks (black-and-white illustrations for prose stories written by Andrew Vachss):
  - "Head Case" (in #8 of the anthology series, 1993)
  - "Half Breed: Death Trap" (in the third edition of the tpb, 208 pages, 2002, ISBN 1-56971-831-8)
- Big Guy and Rusty the Boy Robot #1–2 (a, with Frank Miller, Legend, 1995–1996) collected as Big Guy and Rusty the Boy Robot (tpb, 80 pages, 1996, ISBN 1-56971-201-8)
  - An unlettered and uncolored version of the story was released in an oversized edition titled King-Size Big Guy and Rusty (tpb, 72 pages, 1997, ISBN 1-56971-191-7)
  - A recolored version of the story was released as part of a series of Darrow reprints (hc, 104 pages, 2015, ISBN 1-61655-853-9)
- Art Adams' Creature Features (foreword for the collection, 108 pages, 1996, ISBN 1-56971-214-X)
- Aliens: Havoc #1 (one page, inks on Gary Gianni, written by Mark Schultz, 1997)
- Dark Horse Presents (anthology, 2011–2017):
  - Black-and-white back cover and spot illustrations (in vol. 2 #1–15, 17–36 and vol. 3 #1–33)
  - Black-and-white and full-color illustrations for Andrew Vachss-penned prose stories (in vol. 2 #10–11 and 13)
  - "A Conversation with Geof Darrow" (interview conducted by Mike Richardson; in vol. 2 #22 and on Dark Horse's blog)
  - "Terror Comes Forth on the Fourth!!!!!!" (w/a, Big Guy and Rusty the Boy Robot short story + a pin-up gallery, in vol. 3 #1)
- Shaolin Cowboy (w/a):
  - The Adventure Magazine (with Andrew Vachss, Michael A. Black and Gary Gianni, 96 pages, 2012, ISBN 1-61655-056-2)
  - The Shaolin Cowboy #1–4 (2013–2014) collected as Shaolin Cowboy: Shemp Buffet (hc, 136 pages, 2015, ISBN 1-61655-726-5)
  - Who'll Stop the Reign? #1–4 (2017) collected as Shaolin Cowboy: Who'll Stop the Reign? (hc, 128 pages, 2017, ISBN 1-5067-0365-8)
- Usagi Yojimbo Volume 27: A Town Called Hell (foreword for the collection, hc, 208 pages, 2013, ISBN 1-59582-969-5; tpb, ISBN 1-59582-970-9)
- Lead Poisoning: The Pencil Art of Geof Darrow (artbook with commentary from various comic industry creators, 128 pages, 2017, ISBN 1-5067-0364-X)

=== Other publishers ===
- XXXenophile #9: "Tales of the Velvet Fist: Occupational Hazard" (inks on Phil Foglio, anthology, Palliard Press, 1994)
- Shi: Senryaku #1 (of 3) (two-page illustration for a prose story written by Gary Cohn, among other artists, Crusade, 1995)
- A Fall of Stardust: Portfolio (one full-color plate, Green Man Press, 1999)
- Bits and Pieces of Information (a, with the Wachowskis, webcomic, Warner Bros., 1999) collected in The Matrix Comics Volume 1 (tpb, 160 pages, 2003, ISBN 1-932700-00-5)
- The Art of the Matrix (includes conceptual designs and storyboards created by Darrow for the film accompanied by his commentary, 488 pages, Gardners, 2000, ISBN 1-84023-173-4)
- Shaolin Cowboy #1–7 (w/a, Burlyman Entertainment, 2004–2007) collected as Shaolin Cowboy (tpb, 208 pages, 2014, ISBN 1-932700-40-4; hc, Dark Horse, 2018, ISBN 1-5067-0903-6)
- TOME Volume 1: "Ben Templesmith in Conversation with Geof Darrow" (anthology graphic novel, 200 pages, IDW Publishing, 2013, ISBN 1-63140-459-8)
- DMFAO + DMFAO Too + DMFAO Tree + DMFAO For (series of self-published sketchbooks sold at San Diego Comic-Con, 2013–2016)
- Frank Cho's Women: Selected Drawings and Illustrations Volume 2 (foreword for the artbook, hc, 80 pages, Image, 2013, ISBN 1-60706-636-X; sc, ISBN 1-60706-751-X)
- Where We Live: "Ordinary Devotion" (illustration for a prose story written by Jennifer Battisti, anthology graphic novel, 336 pages, Image, 2018, ISBN 1-5343-0822-9)

=== Cover illustrations ===
- Daredevil/The Punisher: Child's Play tpb (Marvel, 1988)
- Dark Horse Presents #19, 100-3, 135 (Dark Horse, 1988–1998)
- Dark Horse Futures #2 (Dark Horse, 1989)
- Cheval Noir #2 (Dark Horse, 1990)
- Comics' Greatest World: Vortex #3 (Dark Horse, 1993)
- Ray Winninger's Underground (Mayfair Games, 1993)
- Madman Adventures tpb (jam cover) (Tundra, 1993)
- Ammo Armageddon gn (Atomeka, 1993)
- Showcase '94 #11 (DC Comics, 1994)
- Wizard #31 (jam cover) (Wizard Entertainment, 1994)
- Madman Comics #6–7 (with Mike Allred) (Legend, 1995)
- Andrew Vachss' Cross #0–6 (Dark Horse, 1995–1996)
- Concrete: Think Like a Mountain #1–6 (Dark Horse, 1996)
- Oblivion #3 (Comico, 1996)
- The Warrior of Waverly Street #1–2 (Dark Horse, 1996)
- Transmetropolitan #1–3, 22–24 (Helix/Vertigo, 1997–1999)
- Here Come the Big People #1 (Event, 1997)
- Shattered Europe Sourcebook (Onyx Path, 1998)
- The Terminator Special #1 (Dark Horse, 1998)
- Inhumans vol. 2 #2 (Marvel Knights, 1998)
- Tincan Man #1 (Image, 1999)
- Rodéo #582 (Semic, 2000)
- Hard Looks tpb (3rd ed.) (Dark Horse, 2002)
- Another Chance to Get It Right sc (3rd ed.) (Dark Horse, 2003)
- The Matrix Comics Volume 1 tpb (Burlyman Entertainment, 2003)
- Doc Frankenstein #1 (Burlyman Entertainment, 2004)
- The Last Christmas #1 (Image, 2006)
- Daredevil #500 (Marvel, 2009)
- The War That Time Forgot #11 (DC Comics, 2009)
- Fallout: New Vegas – All Roads gn (Dark Horse, 2010)
- G.I. Combat featuring Haunted Tank #1 (DC Comics, 2010)
- Fantastic Four #579 (Marvel, unreleased)
- Marvel Zombies 5 #4 (Marvel, 2010)
- First Wave #4 (DC Comics, 2010)
- Superman #704 (DC Comics, unreleased)
- Conan the Cimmerian #25 (Dark Horse, 2010)
- The Incredible Adventures of Doc Atlas (Oak Tree, 2011)
- Godzilla: Gangsters and Goliaths #1, 5 (IDW Publishing, 2011)
- Jurassic Park: Dangerous Games #1 (IDW Publishing, 2011)
- Dark Horse Presents vol. 2 #4, 22 (Dark Horse, 2011–2013)
- Hawken #5 (IDW Publishing, 2012)
- Wolverine #300 (Marvel, 2012)
- Hit-Girl #4 (Icon, 2012)
- Deadpool vol. 3 #1–5 (Marvel, 2013)
- Peter Panzerfaust #15 (Shadowline, 2013)
- God Hates Astronauts #1 (Image, 2014)
- Ant-Man #2 (Marvel, 2015)
- New MGMT #1 (Dark Horse, 2015)
- Big Man Plans #3 (Image, 2015)
- Uncanny Avengers vol. 2 #1 (Marvel, 2015)
- Dark Horse Presents vol. 3 #24, 27 (Dark Horse, 2016)
- Rumble #15 (Image, 2016)
- Skybourne #1 (Boom! Studios, 2016)
- Ragnarök #11 (IDW Publishing, 2016)
- Monsters Unleashed vol. 2 #1 (Marvel, 2017)
- Aliens: Dead Orbit #1 (Dark Horse, 2017)
- Usagi Yojimbo vol. 4 #6 (IDW Publishing, 2019)
- Frankenstein Undone #5 (Dark Horse, unreleased)
- Post Americana #1 (Image, 2020)

=== Other work ===
- Cheval Noir #9 (fold out poster, Dark Horse, 1990)
- Superman Special (pin-up, DC Comics, 1992)
- Madman Adventures #3 (pin-up, Tundra, 1993)
- Spawn #11 (insert poster featuring Big Guy and Rusty, Image, 1993)
- SDCC Comics #2 (two-page Big Guy and Rusty pin-up, Dark Horse, 1993)
- The Shadow: In the Coils of the Leviathan #3 (poster, Dark Horse, 1994)
- The Sandman: A Gallery of Dreams (two-page pin-up, Vertigo, 1994)
- A Death Gallery (pin-up, Vertigo, 1994)
- Fantastic Four promotional poster (Marvel, 1994)
- Madman Comics #7 (pin-up featuring Rusty, Legend, 1995)
- Ash #3 (two-page pin-up featuring Big Guy and Rusty, Event, 1995)
- Dream Team (Sludge/Apocalypse pin-up, one-shot, Malibu, 1995)
- The Vertigo Gallery: Dreams and Nightmares (Shade, the Changing Man pin-up, 1995)
- Scud the Disposable Assassin #10 (black-and-white pin-up, Fireman Press, 1995)
- Hellboy Christmas Special (two-page Bourbon Thret pin-up, Dark Horse, 1997)
- Little White Mouse #1 (back cover illustration, Caliber, 1997)
- Metamorphosis (short animation for vachss.com, 1998)
- Bart Simpson's Treehouse of Horror #4 (two-page pin-up, Bongo, 1998)
- The Matrix Has You (pin-up for whatisthematrix.com, Warner Bros., 1999)
- Tony Millionaire's Sock Monkey vol. 2 #2 (black-and-white pin-up, Maverick, 1999)
- Hell and Back (A Sin City Love Story) #3 (black-and-white pin-up, Maverick, 1999)
- Gas Giants – From Beyond the Back Burner (CD cover, Atomic Pop Records, 1999)
- The Art of Usagi Yojimbo (black-and-white pin-up, Dark Horse, 2004)
- Dynamite Ham – I Believe in You (CD cover, La Di Da Records, 2005)
- Honey's Butterfly (illustration for The Zero's anniversary gallery, 2006)
- The Halo Graphic Novel (two-page pin-up, Marvel, 2006)
- Mouse Guard: Winter 1152 #1 (pin-up, Archaia, 2007)
- Daredevil #500 (two-page pin-up, Marvel, 2009)
- Rocketeer Adventures #2 (two-page pin-up, IDW Publishing, 2011)
- Monstrosis! #2 (black-and-white Shaolin Cowboy pin-up, SLG, 2011)
- Monsters & Dames #2 (pin-up featuring Shaolin Cowboy, Emerald City Comic-Con, 2011)
- Assassin's Creed (piece for an art exhibition held at Nakano Broadway, Ubisoft, 2012)
- Prophet Strikefile #2 (inside cover illustration, Extreme Studios, 2014)
- Tenth Annual Fantastic Fest poster (Alamo Drafthouse Cinema, 2014)
- Ennio Morricone – Big Gundown (CD cover, Mondo Records, 2015)
- Hellboy Winter Special #2 (pin-up, Dark Horse, 2017)
- John Wick: Chapter 3 – Parabellum (poster, Summit Entertainment, unreleased)
- Godzilla vs. Hedorah (Blu-ray cover, part of the Criterion Godzilla box set, 2019)

== Interviews ==
- "Audio interview, 62 minutes". Comic Zone Radio. January 14, 2008. Archived from the original on January 21, 2008.
- "Audio interview, 80 minutes". Inkstuds. February 25, 2011. Archived from the original on March 8, 2012.
- "Audio interview, 62 minutes". SKTCHD. November 20, 2017. Archived from the original on December 13, 2019.
- "Video interview, 11 minutes". Syfy Wire. July 16, 2018. Archived from the original on 2021-12-13.
