= Doc Frankenstein =

American comic book series

- Cover of Doc Frankenstein 1 (November 2004), art by Steve Skroce

Publication information
- Publisher: Burlyman Entertainment
- Schedule: Irregular
- Format: Ongoing series
- Publication date: November 2004 – present
- No. of issues: 6

Creative team
- Created by: Geof Darrow, Steve Skroce
- Written by: The Wachowskis
- Artist: Steve Skroce
- Inker: Jason Keith
- Letterer: Comicraft
- Editor(s): Spencer Lamm, Sharon Bray

Doc Frankenstein is an American comic book series created by Geof Darrow and Steve Skroce, written by the Wachowskis (Lilly and Lana, better known for their work on The Matrix series), drawn by Skroce, and published by Burlyman Entertainment. Doc Frankenstein combines elements of horror, science fiction, and fantasy. The first issue was published in November 2004 and after six issues, the last of which was released in December 2007, the comic entered a long hiatus. An oversized deluxe hardcover trade paperback was released in November 2019, that completed the story.

== Plot summary ==
The comic tells the story of Frankenstein's monster, who survived the events of Mary Shelley's 1818 novel and adopted his creator's name as his own (and earned doctoral degrees). Doc Frankenstein has since been involved in world history (flashbacks show him as a gunslinger in the Wild West, a soldier in World War II, a supporter of the teaching of evolution in 1925's Scopes Trial, and a supporter of Roe v. Wade in 1972). However, the extremely liberal viewpoints he espouses have made him a target of fundamentalists, who have sought to kill him over the years without success.

== Release schedule ==
The first issue was published in November 2004 and the sixth and last is cover dated December 2007. After that the comic entered a long hiatus as the creative team behind it was busy working on films. In 2014, Geof Darrow and Steve Skroce said there would be a release of Doc Frankenstein that will collect the story in two parts in 2014 and 2015 respectively, with the second part including the final seventh and eighth issues. The second part was later delayed to 2016, but that did not materialize either. In November 2019, an oversized deluxe hardcover edition was released that collected the first six issues and added 64 pages that completed the story. Lana Wachowski has written an introduction for the new edition.

Skroce promised that if they decide to do a second series of the comic, they will stick to the schedule.

== Awards ==
Doc Frankenstein was nominated for the 2005 "Best New Series" Eisner Award.
