= Burlyman Entertainment =

Comic book company

- Industry: Publishing
- Founded: 2004
- Founder: The Wachowskis
- Key people: Spencer Lamm (editor, writer); Geof Darrow (creator, writer, artist); Steve Skroce (creator, artist)
- Products: Comics
- Website: Official website

Burlyman Entertainment is a comic book company created by The Wachowskis, best known as the writer/director duo behind the Matrix Trilogy.

== History ==
"Burlyman" was The Matrix Reloaded and Revolutions' production codename. According to the films' visual effects supervisor John Gaeta, the title is a reference to a film they all loved; the Coen brothers' Barton Fink. He points out that the Wachowskis agonized and struggled to make the Matrix films, just like Fink had to, to write "The Burlyman" screenplay, a wrestling picture. In the introduction to The Matrix Comics Vol. 1 anthology, editor Spencer Lamm recounts an alternative origin that the Watchowskis ostensibly told him: that The Burlyman was the name of the Watchowskis' first script, a wrestling picture; that Lana Wachowski had not seen Barton Fink because it was subtitled (and when corrected, didn't want to see a movie that sounded like it should be subtitled); and that Lilly Wachowski had seen it and felt that it would have been a good movie if it had at least some wrestling in it. Despite the story, the Wachowskis are familiar with the film and included it in a list of films for people who "want to understand Hollywood".

Burlyman Entertainment first started as the publisher for The Matrix Comics series started by the Wachowskis, which was published into two separate volumes. Burlyman Entertainment also published some new, non-Matrix related comics: Shaolin Cowboy, written and drawn by comic book artist Geoff Darrow, who also served as the conceptual designer for the Matrix Trilogy, and Doc Frankenstein, written by the Wachowskis and drawn by Steve Skroce, the storyboard artist for The Matrix trilogy, and previously worked with the Wachowskis on the comic book series, Ectokid.

Since the start of the company, the release of the two ongoing series was irregular, with a professed bi-monthly release schedule that was not fulfilled. Following the release of an issue in December 2007, the company did not release anything for many years afterwards, leading to speculation it had become defunct. In August 2010, comic book creator Geof Darrow stated the company was still going and Steve Skroce was drawing a new issue for Doc Frankenstein, with plans to collect all issues in graphic novel form. In January 2014, Darrow reiterated that Burlyman is not dead, explaining that periods of inactivity are due to the Wachowskis being busy making movies, and adding that as far as he knows the Doc Frankenstein arc will be completed in 2014.

In June 2014, Steve Skroce was interviewed revealing Doc Frankestein is indeed being collected in two parts the second of which includes the final two issues, while Burlyman Entertainment's webshop was updated to include a message stating they're still in business and "big things [are] ahead". It was later announced that part two of the trade will be released in 2015, but this was later delayed to 2016. A trade of Shaolin Cowboy was also announced for release on December 3, 2014. The rights to the Shaolin Cowboy issues published now belong to Dark Horse Comics who published them in 2018 under the title Shaolin Cowboy: Start Trek.

Oversized deluxe hardcover editions for The Matrix Comics and Doc Frankenstein (completing the story) have been announced for release in November 2019.

Among its seemingly canceled projects, the first volume of The Matrix Comics featured an advertisement for The Art of The Matrix Reloaded, Revolutions. During initial testing a dummy version of the Reloaded book came at 588 pages, bigger and thicker than the original Art of The Matrix book. After Geof Darrow suggested that the books have been canceled due to their immense size and thus cost compared to the perceived demand, the last update on the books status was in 2006 in the form of a forum post by editor Spencer Lamm declaring that they had been sidetracked by the V for Vendetta: From Script to Film book and that they had yet to fully develop the idea of how to create the two Art books.

== Appearances ==
The company made an appearance at the 2004 San Diego Comic-Con which included an actual "Burly Man" (looking very much like their company mascot), and two "Burly Babes" passing out giveaways branded with the company logo and ongoing series' titles. Later, the Wachowskis appeared and asked questions from the audience, making it one of their few public appearances over the last decade.

In the movie V for Vendetta, posters for a film 'Burlyman 7' can be seen in the background of a tube train and several street scenes.

== Titles ==
- The Matrix Comics
- Shaolin Cowboy
- Doc Frankenstein
