= Big Guy and Rusty the Boy Robot (TV series) =

- Genre: Science fiction Superhero
- Based on: The Big Guy and Rusty the Boy Robot by: Frank Miller; Geof Darrow
- Developed by: Richard Raynis; Duane Capizzi; Jeff Kline
- Voices of: Pamela Adlon; Jonathan David Cook; Jim Hanks; Gabrielle Carteris; Stephen Root; Kathy Kinney; R. Lee Ermey; Kevin Michael Richardson; M. Emmet Walsh
- Theme music composer: Deddy Tzur
- Composer: Inon Zur
- Country of origin: United States
- Original language: English
- No. of seasons: 2
- No. of episodes: 26

Production
- Executive producers: Mike Richardson; Richard Raynis
- Producer: Frank Squillace
- Running time: 21 minutes
- Production companies: Dark Horse Entertainment; Adelaide Productions; Columbia TriStar Television

Original release
- Network: Fox Kids
- Release: September 18, 1999 – March 5, 2001

Big Guy and Rusty the Boy Robot, also known as The Big Guy and Rusty, is an American animated television series based on the comic book of the same name by Frank Miller and Geof Darrow.

The series ran for 26 episodes and featured the voice of Pamela Adlon (credited as Pamela Segall) as the voice of Rusty, Jonathan David Cook as Big Guy, and the voices of Gabrielle Carteris, Stephen Root, Kathy Kinney, Kevin Michael Richardson, M. Emmet Walsh, and R. Lee Ermey. A line of toys based on the show was produced by Bandai, along with ephemera surrounding a brief promotional tie-in with Burger King.

26 episodes were produced for the Fox Kids Network's Saturday morning lineup, but the channel cancelled the show after six episodes. The show premiered on September 18, 1999, and ended on October 23. This left twenty episodes unaired for more than a year. Starting in January 2001, Fox Kids added the show to its weekday-afternoon block, and aired all twenty-six existing episodes. The entire series was later broadcast on ABC Family in 2002.

On July 12, 2016, Sony Pictures Home Entertainment (through Allied Vaughn) released the complete series on DVD-R.

== Overview ==
The animated series, produced by Columbia TriStar Television and Dark Horse Entertainment, aired from 1999 to 2001, and in many aspects is a more mature and established series. Whereas the comic book seems like only an introduction to the robots, the animated series is full-fledged with a strong back story which links the episodes together. The plot and setting of the series is different from the comic book as the whole story is based around New Tronic City, a fictional North American city clearly modeled after New York City.

== Plot ==
The series focuses on Rusty, the most advanced robot ever built, with a human emotional grid and "nucleoprotonic" powers. The plan by Quark Industries is that Rusty will replace the Big Guy, a massive war robot that is the Earth's last line of defence against all threats alien or domestic. However, Rusty is too inexperienced to stand up against these said threats alone, so the Big Guy is re-commissioned to teach Rusty the way of trade.

Rusty idolizes the Big Guy, regarding him as the best robot ever. In reality, the Big Guy is actually a mindless battle suit piloted by lieutenant Dwayne Hunter, who poses as his chief mechanic. The Big Guy's secret is known only to a few and many situations involve Hunter's clever and impromptu excuses to hide the fact from Rusty for two reasons; that the truth could overload Rusty's emotional grid and Rusty has difficulty keeping secrets.

== Characters ==
=== Main ===
- Rusty (voiced by Pamela Adlon) – Quark Industries's intended replacement for the Big Guy, a robot with real artificial intelligence and powered by nucleoprotons. However, Rusty is far too inexperienced to face the threats that the Big Guy normally handles, so he is relegated to being Big Guy's sidekick and trainee. He idolizes Big Guy, but is unaware that his hero is actually a human inside a metal suit. He has a very childish and toylike look, including his size which makes him physically unimpressive. He is in fact very powerful and impervious to most damage. His behavior also resembles that of a human child, quite immature with strong emotional reactions.
- Big Guy (voiced by Jonathan David Cook) – Designated as the BGY-11, the so-called "robot" champion of Earth is actually a heavily armed battle suit, piloted by Lieutenant Dwayne Hunter. When Quark Industries failed to produce an actual robot with artificial intelligence, the solution was to use a human pilot. Big Guy appears to be roughly 30 ft (9.1 m) tall (when seen interacting with the environment, notably people), is able to fly thanks to rocket boots, possesses great strength and resilience, and is armed with a variety of integrated weaponry.
  - Lieutenant Dwayne Hunter (voiced by Jim Hanks) – The Big Guy's pilot, a secret known only to a few, otherwise known as Big Guy's chief mechanic to those not in the know. He has a crush on Dr. Slate. While in Big Guy, Hunter typically will say "for the love of Mike" when exasperated, making it Big Guy's catchphrase per episode.
- Dr. Erika Slate (voiced by Gabrielle Carteris) – A scientist at Quark Industries, she developed Rusty's human emotional grid and acts like a mother to Rusty. She is one of the few who knows the Big Guy's secret, discovering it by accident when Rusty was looking for a Big Guy fansite and accidentally hacked into confidential files on Big Guy's creation.
- Dr. Axel Donovan (voiced by Stephen Root) – The President of Quark Industries, a robotics firm. He is a caricature of capitalistic greed and moral cowardice.
  - Pierre Donovan (voiced by Mary Kay Bergman) – The nephew of Dr. Donovan, a teenager physical copycat of his uncle, quite arrogant and manipulative but may have some technical skills related to robotics.
  - R-G-B Robots (voiced by Maurice LaMarche in "Birthday Bash", Kevin Michael Richardson in "The Big Boy", Dee Bradley Baker in "Rumble in the Jungle") – A trio of red, green, and blue robots that work for Dr. Donovan. Due to a corrupt code in their system, they fail at following the simplest of commands which ends with them getting wrecked. These robots are regularly destroyed and rebuilt without being improved.
- Jenny the Monkey (voiced by Kathy Kinney) – A monkey who talks and usually sits on Dr. Donovan's shoulder while making fun of Quark's scientists and employees. She has a keen sense of self-preservation.
- Jo, Mack, and Garth (voiced by Pamela Adlon, M. Emmet Walsh, and Kevin Michael Richardson, respectively) – The Big Guy's pit crew and Dwayne's Hunter's friends. They serve on the aircraft carrier S.S. Dark Horse, which acts as Big Guy's base and stores his airship.
- General Thornton (voiced by R. Lee Ermey) – A United States Army general who heads the government's BGY-11 Commission that created the Big Guy. He helps keep the Big Guy's secret from Rusty and the others.

=== Villains ===
- The Squillacci Empire – The very first villains seen in the series, they are squid-like tentacled aliens who make crop circles, attempt to experiment on cows and other stereotypical alien actions. Their attempts to conquer the Earth have been repeatedly thwarted by the Big Guy. It is later revealed that, if not for the Big Guy, the Squillacci Empire would have ruled the earth.
- Legion Ex Machina – An enigmatic group of six advanced robots who aim to destroy humanity and create a robot-heaven of "Robotopia". Though not meant for combat, they proved to be surprisingly strong, resilient and agile, far more than an ordinary human being. The series ends on a cliffhanger, where it is discovered that there is a seventh Legion Ex Machina that Big Guy and Rusty have yet to defeat.
  - Legion Ex Machina #1 (voiced by Clancy Brown) – The de facto leader of the group. He was the first of the legion to come online and can create complex tactics very quickly. In the episode "Double Time", Legion Ex Machina #1 is killed after being thrown against and disintegrated by a powerful force field. He is the sixth and the last member to be destroyed.
  - Legion Ex Machina #2 and #3 (both voiced by Clancy Brown) – Since they both lacked emotions they are nearly identical other than their looks. They often disagree on things and are often at each other's throats at times. However they are completely loyal to Legion Ex Machina #1 and would respect #1, although they are always seen as equals. In the episode "Double Time", Legion Ex Machina #2 is destroyed by Rusty, who drags him into the blades of a gigantic fan and tears him to pieces. Legion Ex Machina #3 is later destroyed when Big Guy pushes him into an acid-filled cauldron.
  - Legion Ex Machina #4 (voiced by Clancy Brown) – He fights Big Guy and Rusty in the first time in "Little Boy Robot Lost", and is presumed destroyed but later is revealed still active in "The Bicameral Mind". In the episode "Donovan's Brainiac", #4's brain is removed by Pierre Donovan and placed in the body of a toy robot. He attempts to destroy the surrounding area by causing a nuclear meltdown, but is thwarted and destroyed by Big Guy.
  - Legion Ex Machina #5 (voiced by Clancy Brown) – The first Legion member to meet the Big Guy. He takes over a munitions factory when meeting with the Chopshoppers, but is thwarted when Big Guy throws him into liquid nitrogen, freezing him solid. Rusty then shatters #5's frozen body, destroying him.
  - Legion Ex Machina #6 (voiced by Dean Haglund) – Also known as Dr. Gilder, #6 was the only member whose emotion grid was fully intact. However his emotions are highly exaggerated and are considered by his peers as a weakness. #6 is initially portrayed as a shy, weak if a bit disturbed scientist but was soon revealed as a Legion Ex Machina member. His emotions also changed to a sadistic and psychopathic killer. #6 is killed by Big Guy, who drops his body into a grinder.
  - The Legion's creations – The creations of the Legion that fight Big Guy and Rusty.
    - Argos – Two robots created by the Legion. The first – roughly the size of Big Guy with similar armament – is destroyed by Big Guy and Rusty. The second Argos is much larger, roughly the size of a skyscraper, but not meant for destruction. Argos is destroyed after its Vortex Cannon is turned against it.
    - The Eliminator – A heavily armed Quark Industries robot that #6 hijacked in an effort to eliminate Donovan in revenge for the destruction of various robots he had created for Quark. It is subsequently defeated by Big Guy and the control drone implanted by Gilder discovered.
    - Project Nova – A large three-legged robot armed with a powerful energy cannon; it was apparently designed and its development intended to be overseen by #4. However, during a mission to acquire fuel for its cannon, an attempt by Rusty to download information from the Legion's systems resulted in him and #4 switching programming. As a result, Rusty creates his own version of Nova, which comes under the control of the Legion. Their programming being switched eventually caused Rusty and #4 to swap bodies; in #4's body, Rusty destroys the second Nova.
    - Bad Guy (voiced by Jonathan David Cook) – A fully robotic clone of Big Guy also known as the BGY-11X. Created to take Big Guy's place to infiltrate the military and Quark. It fights it out with Big Guy who proves to be no match for it, although both robots take heavy damage in the fight. The 11X is destroyed when Lt. Hunter fires Big Guy's hand into its cannon, blocking the shot and causing an explosion.
    - Lt. Hunter Clone – A robotic clone of Lt. Hunter sent to kidnap him and wipe out his mechanics and Doctor Slate. It was destroyed by Rusty, who threw it into a helicopter propeller, causing it to fall off Quark and crash into Donovan's new limo.
- Dr. Neugog (voiced by Tim Curry) – Hieronymus Neugog is a scientist working at Quark Industries who studied telepathy and the inner workings of the mind. Neugog created a machine known simply as the "Dynamo", which was designed to read the mind of whoever it was homed onto. Neugog attempted to impress the board of directors by reading the mind of a board member. However, a spider falls into the machinery and mutates Neugog into a huge, spider-like monster with an oversized brain. Neugog can devour brains via his proboscis, which allows him to assimilate knowledge. When Neugog feeds, the victim is put into a comatose state where they are unable to speak, move, or think.
- Big Rig (voiced by Ron Perlman) - A thug in a robotic suit with missiles. He tried to blow up the Lincoln Memorial before surrendering upon Big Guy's arrival. In "The Big Boy", Big Rig appears as a member of the Chopshoppers. This time, Rusty managed to defeat Big Rig and his unnamed teammate.
- Earl (voiced by Pamela Adlon) – Earl (E.P 327) is an early prototype of Rusty. He has an underdeveloped emotion grid and follows orders literally. Initially brought back online by Rusty for him to have a friend, but after he goes too far and blows the Big Guy's head off, Rusty fights him and manages to decapitate him and remove his powerpack.

== Episodes ==
=== Series overview ===
Season	Episodes	Originally released	
Season	Episodes	First released	Last released
1	6	September 18, 1999	October 23, 1999
2	20	January 30, 2001	March 5, 2001

=== Season 1 (1999) ===
No. overall	No. in season	Title	Directed by	Written by	Original release date	Prod. code
1	1	"Creatures, Great and Small"	Frank Squillace	Duane Capizzi	September 18, 1999	101
After 10 years of service, the BGY-11 superhero robot known as "Big Guy" is retired by new Quark Ind. President Axel Donovan, to be replaced by Dr. Erika Slate's 'Rusty' - a robot child meant to deliver on the old promise of an A.I. Robot capable of defending the people. Meanwhile, US Army LT. Dwayne Hunter is given a classified Medal of Valor for piloting Big Guy. After an alien creature crashes and runs amok, Rusty cannot beat it, so Hunter's team rebuilds Big Guy to help Rusty defeat the alien, and the two work together to finally destroy the monster. After Big Guy is publicly recommissioned, Rusty is officially made his new partner to teach the eager young robot.
2	2	"Out of Whack"	Mike Goguen	Greg Weisman	September 25, 1999	102
When Rusty sees Donovan order Dr. Gilder's robot scrapped for being "Out of Whack", Rusty fears for his own upkeep. ARG-12 (Argos) attacks the ARMY seeking Big Guy, Gen. Thornton signals Big Guy, who is followed by Rusty. Argos offers Big Guy to join "Legion Ex Machina", but he refuses; Argos overpowers Big Guy with the same nucleoprotonic powers as Rusty, who gets damaged, but retreats as his power cells nearly deplete. As Slate examines Rusty, she discovers his technology is stolen, unaware Dr. Gilder covertly stole it for the Legion; Donovan blames her, but as she tries to explain, Rusty flees. Slate calls Hunter to explain she wants to help him, so Big Guy meets the boy robot, but both are surprised by a recharged Argos. However, Hunter realized Argos expends too much fuel, so Big Guy overexerts his power but is downed, until Rusty tricks Argos into taking his damaged battery pack and explodes. Upon reboot, Big Guy manages to get Rusty to Slate for repair.
3	3	"The Inside Scoop"	Jane Wu Soriano	Roger S.H. Schulman	October 2, 1999	103
Rusty tries to find a Big Guy website, but after being sent away Slate finds he actually hacked into the ARMY's classified file on the BGY-11 project, learning Big Guy is really a mech suit piloted by Hunter. Dr. Neugog, who invented a telepathy machine, mutated into a spider-like monster hungry for brains, attacks Quark Ind. Big Guy battles Neugog on the roof, but as Hunter is human, Neugog uses his mind control to make Big Guy (Hunter) bring him Erika Slate. Rusty arrives in time to snap-out Hunter and save Slate; she later finds and repurposes Neugog's original helmet to allow Hunter immunity to Neugog's powers. At the Science Expo, Neugog attacks and breaches Big Guy's hull plating to reach Hunter; he refuses to bail out, and stalls until Rusty gets into the fight again to knock out Neugog. A defeated Neugog is drained of all stolen brainwaves, which are promptly used to restore his victims. Meanwhile, Slate and Hunter start to become close, much to Rusty's childish ignorance thinking they are dating.
4	4	"Birthday Bash"	Nathan Chew	Alexx Van Dyne	October 9, 1999	104
After Quark Ind. retrieves an alien item, two alien mercenaries hunt for it. As Hunter preps for a day off, his team give him a transponder to remote summon Big Guy; Rusty learns about "birthdays" with real children, and comes across the alien device taking it as a "gift"; Hunter arrives for his nephew Jeffy's birthday, surprised Rusty followed him. Slate finds two scientists merged by the alien device into a single entity with all body parts of both; she sees the two aliens in the lab and realizes Rusty took the device, and calls Hunter to warn him. The device activates, trapping Hunter's sister in a wall, with the aliens tracking it to her house. Rusty keeps it away by throwing it to Big Guy, and Rusty prevents the house from being destroyed. The aliens get the device, but Big Guy thinks quick and shoots it to activate it and fused the aliens. Using the device, Hunter's sister is freed from the wall, who allows Big Guy and Rusty to stay for cake to celebrate Jeffy's birthday.
5	5	"The Reluctant Assassin"	Andrew Thom	Brian Swenlin	October 16, 1999	105
Rusty feels small after helping Big Guy fight Big Rig at the Lincoln Memorial. He asks Dr. Slate for an arsenal to look tough. Donovan's new robot "The Eliminator" promptly attacks him, as elsewhere Dr. Gilder remotely pilots Eliminator to attack him, but is thwarted when Big Guy arrives. Thornton believes a Legion Ex Machina member is inside their ranks so Donovan is moved to Big Guy's base the S.S. Dark Horse. Meanwhile, the Legion berate Gilder for his emotional outburst nearly ending Donovan and jeopardizing their plans. So, Gilder deceives Rusty by giving him a blaster which hacks into his memory and locates a hiding Donovan. Gilder tricks the emergency signal to get Big Guy to leave, making Donovan vulnerable, and hijacking Rusty's motor functions to attack. Hunter quickly realizes the deception, calls Slate to track the call, and returns to base in time to help Rusty. As Slate has security arrest Gilder, he overpowers them to continue, until Big Guy tears out Rusty's arm to stop the remote control; Gilder reveals to Slate his true robot form. Big Guy and Rusty arrive in time to save Slate, and capture Gilder's head for analysis.
6	6	"Really Big Guy"	Mike Goguen	Cade Chilcoat	October 23, 1999	106
When accessing Gilder's memory bank, a detonation is tripped and Rusty quickly flies the head out of range. From the recovered memory files, they are able to deduce the Legion's base is under the city, but encounter a Legion cargo transport. Rusty derails it, and the cargo is a giant robot hand the size of Big Guy. Legion Ex Machina learn of the interception and activate their objective: a new Argos robot. Big Guy and Rusty encounter the new Argos but realize they are greatly overpowered by it, until Hunter's teammate Jo makes an analysis to find a solution: take the firing trigger from Argos 2 and add it to the hand to destroy Argos. The new Argos takes the Quark Ind. microfusion generator which powers the city. Rusty charges the Argos, but when everyone thinks he was destroyed on impact, he actually landed inside of the Argos' internal mechanics. As Hunter and team review the hand and firing trigger, Big Guy sees Rusty inside Argos's head; allowing for coordination, Rusty unlocks the arm for Big Guy to combine it to the hand and finish the weapon need to stop Argos. Hunter's crew use the device just in time for Rusty to escape the destruction, earning Big Guy's praise. With the Microfusion Generator returned, the city gets back to normal.

=== Season 2 (2001) ===
Note that the episodes aired out of order. Following the production numbers in the final column presents the accurate sequence number. For instance, episode 124 "Rumble in the Jungle" was intended to air before the 2-part series finale, "Double Time".

No. overall	No. in season	Title	Directed by	Written by	Original release date	Prod. code
7	1	"Little Boy Robot Lost"	Andy Thom	Roger S.H. Schulman	January 30, 2001	112
The Legion Ex Machina attempts to download Rusty's programming, but Rusty escapes and finds himself lost on the internet. Number 4 attempts to track and recover his programming code, forcing Dr. Slate and Big Guy to go virtual to save the boy robot.
8	2	"The Bicameral Mind"	Frank Squillace	David Slack	February 2, 2001	113
When a Legion robot tries to steal Anti-Protons, Rusty is sent in to hack the bot. Legion Ex Machina Number 4 tries to hack Rusty's mind in retaliation, causing the two robots to switch priorities, resulting in Number 4 playing games and Rusty building a Legion robot called Project Nova.
9	3	"The Inside Out"	Nathan Chew	David Slack	February 2001	108
Quark develops Nurds, tiny robots that repair broken machinery. Some Nurds infect Big Guy and alter him, making him capable of autonomous behavior with no need for a pilot. However, the Nurds run amok constantly upgrading and fixing everything they find, even if it doesn't need it, which includes a recently destroyed Legion robot.
10	4	"Moon Madness"	Andrew Thom	Alexx Van Dyne	February 2001	109
Edie, the AI of Quark's new space station, has gone mad, threatening to destroy the moon and demanding an advanced computer chip from Quark that would give her access to the entire worlds computer systems. Dr. Slate is put through rushed astronaut training while Lt. Hunter uses weightless training to assemble Big Guy, hidden aboard the space shuttle. Meanwhile, Thornton feels that Rusty is too green and orders him kept out of this, but the boy robot puts the mission at risk by tagging along.
11	5	"Wages of Fire"	Frank Squillace	David Slack	February 2001	110
Big Guy and Rusty work to stop a volcano from erupting. Inside the volcano, they find magma monsters bent on world domination. Rusty's confidence takes a hit with his repeated mistakes that injure Big Guy several times.
12	6	"The Big Boy"	Nathan Chew	Marlowe Weisman	February 2001	111
Rusty wishes he was larger and gets his wish when he puts his head on a new robot body prototype developed by Quark. However, he soon finds himself targeted by a group of chopshoppers (consisting of Gage, Big Rig, and an unnamed member) is a part of as well as the Legion Ex Machina.
13	7	"World of Pain"	Dave Bullock	Bill Motz and Bob Roth	February 2001	114
A family of alien robots called The Neo-Cateri arrives on Earth. They are hunted by insect-like robots called the Zingkal who are out to destroy their biological matter. While repairing Rusty, the Neo-Cateri child unintentionally gives Rusty the ability to feel pain, which makes him unable to perform his job.
14	8	"Sibling Mine"	Jane Wu	Rodney Gibbs	February 2001	107
After a Quark machine goes haywire, a strange monster appears. Donovan declares the monster a terrorist, prompting Big Guy to go after it. Meanwhile, Rusty finds an earlier boy robot prototype that was abandoned by Dr. Slate. Rusty activates the robot, naming it Earl. However, Rusty finds out that the monster just wants to go home, while Earl attempts to eliminate the creature to the point where he persuades General Thorton to have Rusty recalled.
15	9	"Blob, Thy Name Is Envy"	Andy Thom	Dean Stefan	February 2001	115
While trying to create artificial feelings, Dr. Slate creates a blob like creature that can clean up almost anything. Seeing dollar signs, Donovan markets them as Squeeky Gleem for the home consumer. However, the Squeekies have an emotional attachment to Dr. Slate and they're willing to get rid of anyone who shows her affection....including Hunter.
16	10	"Donovan's Brainiac"	Curt Walstead	David Slack	February 2001	116
Donovan's nephew Pierre steals the remains of Legion Ex Machina #4 to use in his own robot. Number Four, feeling humiliated by his new body, and angered at the rest of the Legion abandoning him, decides to seek revenge by triggering a nuclear meltdown.
17	11	"Patriot Games"	Dave Bullock	David Slack	February 2001	117
While testing a time traveling prototype ship, Big Guy gets separated from Lt. Hunter and Rusty. They return to Neutronic City, but find that the Squillacci have taken over the Earth. They find Dr. Slate, who tells them that America lost the Revolutionary War because the British had a clock-work titan called Iron Jack, actually the Big Guy, on their side. Lt. Hunter and Rusty steal back their time ship and go back 200 years to set history right.
18	12	"Harddrive"	Chap Yaep	Eddie Guzelian	February 2001	118
Hard Drive, a new robot, arrives to prove he is superior to Big Guy when a swarm of mutant beetles attack. At the same time an old friend of Hunter's named Harley Griffin becomes employed by Quark. Griffin seems to get along with everyone, even building Rusty his own rocket. Unbeknownst to everyone else, Hardfrive is a mech suit built by Griffin to rid the world of all artificial intelligence and Rusty's rocket is a bomb designed to help with that.
19	13	"5000 Fingers of Rusty"	Curt Walstead	Alexx Van Dyne	February 2001	119
Quark releases a "home version" of Rusty to be sold commercially. Soon the Legion Ex Machina take control of the mass-produced Rustys.
20	14	"The Champ"	Andy Thom	Eddie Guzelian	February 2001	120
An alien warrior named Po the Obliterator arrives to challenge Earth's greatest champion, Big Guy. He defeats Big Guy and claims his suit from Lt. Hunter, but Rusty travels after Po and retrieves The Big Guy, causing Po to chase after him in order to reclaim him trophy, which leads to an epic rematch.
21	15	"Sickout"	Dave Bullock	David Slack	February 2001	121
An alien virus spreads across the nation thanks to an alien specimen found by scientists. Earl is pulled out of storage to help combat the infection by downloading much-needed information from a drone-guarded computer. With Hunter infected by the virus thanks to the alien evolving into a giant beast, Dr. Slate is forced to pilot Big Guy to stop the monster from reaching the city.
22	16	"Nephew of Neugog"	Chap Yaep	Roger S.H. Schulman	February 2001	122
Pierre experiments with Dr. Neugog's helmet and becomes a brain-sucking monster. With Dr. Slate becoming one of Pierre's victims, Big Guy and Rusty reluctantly turn to Dr. Neugog for help.
23	17	"The Lower Depths"	Curt Walstead	Steven Melching	February 2001	123
Strange undersea creatures infiltrate Quark's new underwater research center by duplicating all the personnel. But the creatures are only minions of a more massive creature called the Leviathan that seeks to take over the surface world.
24	18	"Double Time (1)"	Dave Bullock	David Slack	March 1, 2001	125
The Legion Ex Machina builds a duplicate Big Guy in an attempt to replace the original. However, they are unaware of Lt. Hunters presence inside, which forces them to construct a duplicate of Hunter to infiltrate the military.
25	19	"Double Time (2)"	Chap Yaep	Eddie Guzelian	March 2, 2001	126
The Legion Ex Machina sends a robotic duplicate of Lt. Hunter to replace the original. After the robot is discovered and subdued, Dr. Slate begins to look for Dr. Poindexter, the man who designed the Big Guy. Using Rusty to track the Legion to their own hideout, they find that Poindexter actually created the Legion, but they turned on him and sought to replace mankind with robots.
26	20	"Rumble in the Jungle"	Andy Thom	Alexx Van Dyne	March 5, 2001	124
Huge animals wreak havoc in the Congo jungle. When Big Guy and Rusty are sent in, Rusty is damaged and begins to think he is a monkey. They soon discover that the huge animals are the work of the missing scientist Dr. Mertz who has merged himself with a white-furred black-skinned gorilla named Bobo to become a two-headed giant mutant gorilla.

== Cast ==
- Pamela Adlon as Rusty, Jo, Earl (in "Sibling Mine", "Sick Out")
- Jonathan David Cook as The Big Guy, Bad Guy (in "Double Time" Pt. 1)
- Gabrielle Carteris as Dr. Erika Slate
- Jim Hanks as Dwayne Hunter
- Stephen Root as Dr. Axel Donovan
- Kathy Kinney as Jenny the Monkey
- Kevin Michael Richardson as Garth, Magma Monster #1 (in "Wages of Fire"), Chopshopper Member (in "The Big Boy"), R-G-B Robots (in "The Big Boy")
- M. Emmett Walsh as Mack
- R. Lee Ermey as Gen. Thorton

=== Additional voices ===
- Dee Bradley Baker as Moon Platoon Member (in "Little Boy Robot Lost"), Toon Tiger (in "Little Boy Robot Lost"), Squillacci #1 (in "Patriot Games"), Pugsley (in "The Lower Depths"), Zoologist #2 (in "Rumble in the Jungle"), R-G-B Robots (in "Rumble in the Jungle")
- Jillian Barberie
- Mary Kay Bergman as Pierre (in "Donovan's Brainiac", "Nephew of Neugog")
- Victor Brandt
- Clancy Brown as Legion Ex Machina #1, Legion Ex Machina #2, Legion Ex Machina #3, Legion Ex Machina #4, Legion Ex Machina #5, Gage (in "The Big Boy")
- Nancy Cartwright
- Michael Chiklis as Harley Griffin (in "Harddrive")
- Cam Clarke as Squeeky Gleem Announcer (in "Blob, Thy Name is Envy"), Huckle (in "Blob, They Name is Envy"), Husband (in "5000 Fingers of Rusty")
- Tim Curry as Dr. Neugog (in "The Big Scoop" and "Nephew of Neugog")
- John de Lancie as Neo-Cateri Matriarch (in "World of Hurt")
- Brian Doyle-Murray as Po the Obliterator (in "The Champ")
- Nora Dunn - Edie (in "Moon Madness")
- Steve Edwards
- Stan Freberg as Dr. Poindexter (in "Double Time" Pt. 2)
- John Garry as Zingkal Leader (in "World of Hurt")
- Nicholas Guest as Quark Scientist (in "Sibling Mine")
- Dean Haglund as Legion Ex Machina #6/Dr. Glider (in "Out of Whack", "The Reluctant Assassin", "Really Big Guy")
- Jennifer Hale as Neo-Cateri Matriarch (in "World of Hurt")
- Sherman Howard
- Helen Kalafatic
- Maurice LaMarche as Dr. Ellerby (in "The Inside Scoop"), Doctor (in "The Inside Scoop"), Alien #1 (in "Birthday Bash"), R-G-B Robots (in "Birthday Bash"), Zoologist #1 (in "Rumble in the Jungle"), Dr. Mertz (in "Rumble in the Jungle")
- Ron Perlman as Big Rig (in "The Reluctant Assassin", "The Big Boy")
- Patrick Pinney as Magma Monster #2 (in "Wages of Fire")
- Justin Jon Ross as Neo-Cateri Kid (in "World of Hurt")
- Kevin Schon
- Maura Tierny as Darlene (in "Birthday Bash")

== Crew ==
- Susan Blu - Dialogue Director
