= Shaolin Cowboy =

American comic book series

- Cover of Shaolin Cowboy #1 (December 2004). Art by Geof Darrow.

Publication information
- Publisher: Burlyman Entertainment; Dark Horse Comics
- Schedule: Burlyman: Irregular; Dark Horse: Monthly
- Format: Ongoing series
- Genre: Action, adventure, superhero
- Publication date: December 2004
- No. of issues: Burlyman: 7 Dark Horse: 11

Creative team
- Created by: Geof Darrow
- Written by: Geof Darrow
- Artist: Geof Darrow
- Letterer: Peter Doherty
- Colorist(s): Peter Doherty; Dave Stewart; Alex Wald
- Editor: Spencer Lamm

Collected editions
- Volume 1: ISBN 2-8094-0277-9

Shaolin Cowboy is an American comic book series created, written and drawn by artist Geof Darrow (with the exception of the opening dialog in the issues of the original 2004–2007 run, written by The Wachowskis). The book was published irregularly by Burlyman Entertainment.

At the 2011 Toronto, San Diego and New York Comic Cons, Dark Horse Comics announced that they would be publishing three new Shaolin Cowboy comics, starting with a new Number One. The first issue of the new Dark Horse series has been solicited for release on October 9, 2013 as an ongoing series.

Dark Horse in 2012 ran a $15 "The Shaolin Cowboy Adventure Magazine" with art by Geoffrey Darrow, Gary Gianni. The Way of "No Way!"; Time Factor; The Shaolin Cowboy's Helpful Hints.

In 2017 and 2022, Dark Horse Comics published a new 4 issue miniseries Who'll Stop The Reign?, again written and drawn by Darrow. The series ran from April to July 2017 and was colored by Dave Stewart. Variant covers for the issues were produced by Frank Miller, Frank Cho, Sergio Aragones and Genndy Tartakovsky. Next was the 7 issue Shaolin Cowboy: Cruel to be Kin, ending in 2022. The last issue of Cruel to be Kin hit the stands in November 2022.

A new limited series titled Staying A.I.Live started in 2026.

== Plot summary ==
The book is about an unnamed former Shaolin monk who wanders the land with a talking mule named Lord Evelyn Dunkirk Winniferd Esq. the Third. Having been "asked" to leave the Shaolin temple, he has since had a bounty placed on his head, which many are eager to collect. Given the Shaolin Cowboy's prowess in martial arts, however, this will be very difficult.

Taking place in an unspecified time setting (as the first issue notes, "the day after yesterday and a week before tomorrow"), the book features extremely detailed artwork and equally violent and absurd action scenes; in one, the main character battles a giant shark with a human head in its mouth using two chainsaws tied on the ends of a long stick – which all takes place in the stomach of a lizard, on whose back a city is located.

== Collected editions ==
Six issues of the Burlyman seven issue series were translated into French and collected into a number of trade paperbacks by Panini Comics:

- Volume 1: La vengeance du roi crabe (collects issues 1 & 2, 60 pages, May 2008, ISBN 2-8094-0277-9)
- Volume 2 (collects issues 3 & 4, 70 pages, November 2008, ISBN 2-8094-0413-5)
- Volume 3 (collects issues 5 & 6, 48 pages, April 2009, ISBN 2-8094-0688-X)

Burlyman released a 208 page trade paperback called Geoff Darrow's The Shaolin Cowboy on December 3, 2014 that collected their entire 7-issue series.

Dark Horse released a 144 page hardcover called The Shaolin Cowboy: Shemp Buffet on March 4, 2015 that collected their first entire 4-issue series.

Dark Horse released a 128 page hardcover called The Shaolin Cowboy: Who'll Stop the Reign? on October 25, 2017 that collected their second entire 4-issue series.

Dark Horse reprinted all seven of the original issues of Shaolin Cowboy as published by Burlyman in a hardcover edition on July 18, 2018, titled Shaolin Cowboy: Start Trek.

Dark Horse released a 240 page hardcover called The Shaolin Cowboy: Cruel To Be Kin on August 8, 2023, collecting the eponymous 7-issue series.

== Awards ==
Shaolin Cowboy was nominated for three Eisner Awards in 2005 for "Best New Series", "Best Penciller/Inker or Penciller/Inker Team", and "Best Coloring".
