= Oak Tree Press =

British enterprise publishing house

Oak Tree Fine Press
- Founded: 2005, Fyfield, Oxford, UK
- Purpose: Raising funds for the shelter, care and, support of child victims of the AIDS crisis
- Method: Publishing and bookselling of limited edition signed work by world-leading artists and authors
- Website: www.oaktreefinepress.com

Oak Tree Fine Press is an online and in-store enterprise publishing house set up with the support of Nobel Laureate J. M. Coetzee. It publishes limited edition hand-bound signed books pairing leading writers and artists to publish works of modern literary fiction.

Oak Tree Press was founded in 2006 and is based in Hertfordshire, UK. It is primarily run on a volunteer-basis.

== Series published by Oak Tree Press ==
=== The First Chapter Series (Booker Prize) ===
This series is a collaboration between Booker Prize-winning writers and high-profile artists to raise money for organizations offering care and support to AIDS orphans and victims in Africa. Each volume features the opening chapters of a Booker Prize-winning novel, accompanied by original artwork inspired by the novel. Contributors include J. M. Coetzee, Stanley Middleton, Nadine Gordimer, Barry Unsworth, Margaret Atwood, A. S. Byatt, Alan Hollinghurst, Salman Rushdie, Yoko Ono, Gilbert & George, Thomas Keneally, Antony Gormley, Cyril Coetzee, Ezekiel Mabote, Colbert Mashile, and Jo Ractliffe.

=== Nobel Lectures ===
These volumes contain the full text of the lecture presented by Noble Laureates to the Swedish Academy after their Nobel Prize in Literature acceptance. The lectures of Doris Lessing, Günter Grass, and Toni Morrison have so far been produced.

=== Modern Classics ===
Contributors to this series include John le Carré and Philip Pullman.

=== Open Book ===
Open Book is a series presenting books as art. First in the series is the reproduction of Beloved by Toni Morrison.

=== J. M. Coetzee Series ===
Features signed extracts from the novels of J. M. Coetzee.

== Philanthropy ==
All proceeds from the sales of books by Oak Tree Fine Press are targeted at organizations which offer support to the child victims of the African HIV/AIDS crisis.
