= Hard Boiled (comics) =

Comic book series written by Frank Miller

- Cover of Hard Boiled TPB cover

Publication information
- Publisher: Dark Horse Comics
- Schedule: Irregular
- Format: Mini-series
- Genre: Science fiction
- Publication date: September 1990 – March 1992
- No. of issues: 3

Creative team
- Written by: Frank Miller
- Artist: Geof Darrow
- Letterer: John Workman
- Colorist: Claude Legris
- Editor: Randy Stradley

Collected editions
- Hard Boiled: ISBN 1-878574-58-2

Hard Boiled is a three-issue comic book mini-series written by Frank Miller and drawn by Geof Darrow. It was published by American company Dark Horse Comics in 1990–1992. Frank Miller and Geof Darrow won the 1991 Eisner award for Best Writer/Artist for this series.

The story follows Carl Seltz, an insurance investigator who discovers he is also a homicidal cyborg tax collector who happens to be the last hope of an enslaved robot race.

== Plot ==
In a dystopian, near-future Los Angeles, city tax collector Nixon is badly injured during a violent encounter with one of his targets, and he undergoes extensive surgery to survive. Nixon then wakes up in a bedroom, believing his previous experience was a bad dream and that he is really Carl Seltz, an insurance investigator for the Benevolent Assurance Corporation, with a wife, two children, a dog, and a normal life. However, when his persistent dreams disturb his sleep, his wife distracts him with sex while his children inject him with a sleep-inducing drug, indicating not all is as it seems.

The next day, Carl heads out to pursue a delinquent account, talking to himself the whole way. His ramblings reveal increasingly large inconsistencies in his own memory, to the point where he even starts referring to himself by different names. He is distracted when his target's vehicle appears on his car's scanner, and he sets out in pursuit. After a high-speed chase through the city, both cars end up destroyed, and Carl continues pursuing his targets, an old woman and a young girl, on foot. As the two parties battle each other, the old woman is injured and revealed to be a robot, which Carl seemingly destroys with a large grenade just as the police converge on the area. The resulting explosion blows Carl into a Behemoth supermarket, where he finds that the flesh of his hands and face have been torn away, revealing robotic parts like those of the old woman.

Dazed and confused, Carl begins making his way back home. As he navigates the wreckage of the battle outside the supermarket, he encounters the old woman again, who tears off the remains of her false skin to reveal her robotic chassis. She calls herself Unit Two, and informs Carl that his family are all actually paid handlers, that he is really a robot called Unit Four, code-named "Nixon", and both his jobs as an insurance investigator and a tax collector are covers for his real function as a corporate assassin for Willeford Home Appliances, the corporation that created all the world's robots. Unit Two explains that she and the little girl, also a robot, have broken the programming that forces them to serve humans, and are part of a revolutionary group led by Barbara, a robot that works inside Willeford's headquarters, that intends to free all robots from their programmed slavery. She claims Carl is the revolution's only hope, being the only robot powerful enough to stand up to Willeford's paramilitary security forces. Carl, however, refuses to believe her, and he knocks her head off in a fit of rage. The little girl robot appears and berates Carl for his behavior until Carl's dog arrives and reveals itself to be a robot as well (when it destroys her).

At the Willeford building, it is revealed that both Barbara and Mr. Willeford, the morbidly obese founder of the company, have been tracking Carl's movements through the city. Meanwhile, Carl steals a new set of clothes and makes his way onto the subway, where he is attacked by a group of frightened citizens and is forced to kill them. Carl's dog follows him onto the train as Carl finds a Willeford logo underneath the torn skin on his arm and realizes that Unit Two's story was true. Carl's dog offers to lead him to the Willeford building to get some answers from his creators.

Later that night, Barbara hears loud noises from inside the Willeford building and goes to investigate, finding a trail of destruction and dead bodies leading deeper into the building. Realizing Carl has arrived, she rushes off to find him. When she finally reaches him, she sees that Carl has slaughtered most of the security forces but has been all but destroyed in the process. When Barbara finds him, he is in the clutches of Willeford's mechanical aides and is slowly being pulled apart by his owner. Defeated, Carl makes a deal with Mr. Willeford to be put back together, have his memory reset, and be returned to his family. Her plans for revolution in shambles, Barbara commits suicide by hooking herself up to a large generator and overloading her circuits. Some time later, Carl, with a new skin, new car and new memories, returns to his family, completely unaware of his true nature once more.

== Video game ==
An arcade shoot-em-up video game was released in 1997 for the PlayStation, developed by French company Cryo Interactive Entertainment. It was to be published by GTE Interactive Media, but as that company closed doors, it was published by Cryo themselves in Europe, and by Sieg Co. in Japan. PC and Saturn versions were announced but never released; prototypes of the Saturn version were eventually released.

== Film ==
In 2001, Variety reported that Warner Brothers was in negotiations with Miller and Darrow to adapt the comic book into a film, David Fincher set to direct and Nicolas Cage to star. The website comics2film stated that Cage informed Cinescape magazine that he was working to produce the film under his company, Saturn Films. In 2008, Miller stated that he would be directing the film version. In 2013, Vehicle 19 director Mukunda Michael Dewil stated that he would be directing the film version. In 2016, Deadline reports that Warner Bros. are working on acquiring the rights to Hard Boiled with Ben Wheatley and is looking to reteam with his High-Rise star Tom Hiddleston for the film.

== Collected editions ==
In 1993, Dark Horse compiled and released the series in a 128-page trade paperback (ISBN 1-878574-58-2). The original novel cover depicting an orgy was deemed too explicit for audiences and the publisher recalled it from shelves before it could be released.

In 2017, Dark Horse released a second edition of the series in a 136-page hardcover (ISBN 1-506701-07-8). For this re-release, Eisner-winning colorist Dave Stewart was hired to create a completely new color palette, putting an emphasis on more neutral, realistic hues, a decision which generated some controversy.
