= Batman: The Black Mirror =

Batman comics story arc

- Publisher: DC Comics
- Publication date: January – October 2011
- Genre: Superhero
Title(s)
Detective Comics #871–881
- Main character(s): Batman; James Gordon; Oracle; James Gordon Jr.

Creative team
- Writer: Scott Snyder
- Artist(s): Jock, Francesco Francavilla

"The Black Mirror" is a Batman story arc written by Scott Snyder, and illustrated by Jock and Francesco Francavilla. The story was published in ten issues of Detective Comics in 2011 by DC Comics. It is known for being the final Batman storyline of the Post-Crisis DC Universe before the 2011 reboot initiative New 52. The storyline was released to critical acclaim from critics who praised Scott Snyder's writing, the art, the horror tone and the action, which managed to convince DC Comics to hire Scott Snyder as the main writer for Batman in the New 52.

== Premise ==
The plot tells the continued adventures of Dick Grayson as Batman, as Bruce Wayne continues his work for Batman Incorporated. Dick must battle against several villains, one of whom is selling various super villain weapons and items in an underground black market. Also, Jim Gordon and his daughter Barbara Gordon must contend with the return of James Gordon Jr., whom they have ex-communicated due to his continued psychopathy.

== Plot ==
Dick Grayson, who has been operating as Batman during Bruce Wayne's hiatus, investigates a young boy transformed into a monster similar to Killer Croc after ingesting a potion. After the boy's mother kills his father in a murder-suicide, Dick and Commissioner Jim Gordon learn the woman was brainwashed by Mad Hatter. Gordon suspects that Cullen Buck is responsible, but Buck mysteriously dies while being questioned. Barbara Gordon tips Dick to William Rhodes, a member of Mirror House, which auctions the equipment of Gotham's vilains. Rhodes accidentally kills himself, and Dick assumes his identity to infiltrate Mirror House. Using leads from Harvey Bullock, Dick attends an auction. However, the auction's head, Etienne Guiborg, figures out that Dick is a spy and orders attendees to kill him.

Dick narrowly escapes the toxin-filled room and is found by Tim Drake in an alley. He goes to confront Etienne, who transforms into a creature similar to Man-Bat. Dick defeats Etienne, but the plan explodes mid-fight. Still shaken by the toxin, Dick moves back into Wayne Enterprises. Jim and Bullock investigate a crime involving the Mayor's aviary cages being unlocked, with James Gordon Jr. as the primary suspect. During dinner, James Jr. talks to Jim about his recent mental health struggles, later asking for his and Dick's help to get a job under Leslie Thompkins. Meanwhile, Dick, still affected by the toxin, fights crime with Tim.

After capturing a serial child killer. Jim is reminded of a time when James Jr. made one of Barbara's friends, Bess, uncomfortable before she went missing. Both Jim and Barbara become suspicious that James Jr. killed her. While investigating a mystery surrounding an orca appearing in Gotham Global Modern Bank, Jim asks Dick to check on James Jr. They recover Evelyn Marr's corpse from the orca, who is an employee of Sonia Zucco, the head of Gotham Global. Dick confronts Sonia, overhearing her talking to a man named Bixty Rhodes after he leaves.

Sonia tells Dick that Tiger Shark is outside the Gotham City coast guard, and Dick goes out to investigate where he finds out Tiger Shark uses the old gas pipeline to move his material in and out of Gotham City, but is captured.

Dick manages to free himself and escape while Tiger Shark gets away and goes to meet James Gordon Junior to catch up with him. Dick and James Gordon Jr. reminisce the old days, with Dick mentioning a boy named Ben Wolff was with them, but soon has to leave because of a notification. However, James Gordon Jr. reveals himself to still be a psychopath who is torturing and killing Ben Wolff. Dick suits ups as Batman and confronts Sonia Branch who is revealed to have deleted the video footage of Tiger Shark's men bringing the whale to the Gotham Global Modern Bank due to her having access to the building security system in order for Dick to take down Bixty Rhodes and confront Tiger Shark, and Sonia Branch tells Batman she did it because Tiger Shark and Bixty Rhodes were harassing her and killed her friend, which causes Batman to coldly leave her.

Joker is being shipped off to Arkham Asylum while Commissioner Gordon meets up with Leslie Thompkins to ask how is James Gordon Junior doing. Commissioner Gordon is unease with his son, so he sneaks in his desk and steals a pill called Diaxamyne and wants Barbara Gordon to test it to see if it actually does treat psychopathy. After a few hours, Barbara Gordon learns that James Gordon Junior inverted the formula so that it turns people into psychopaths, and Commissioner Gordon remembers that Leslie told him that James Gordon Junior volunteered to do nutrition runs for infants in order to poison Gotham's children. Joker manages to escape from custody, and Commissioner Gordon arrives at home to realize that James Gordon Junior did kill Bess.

Commissioner Gordon tries calling his ex-wife again but finds her mutilated due to the Joker Toxin, and Dick has to save her by extracting the toxin. Dick manages to track down the Joker in the South Bowery Tunnels, but Joker tells him that he wasn't the one who mutilated James's ex-wife but James Gordon Junior. James Gordon Junior kidnaps Barbara Gordon and stabbed her in her femoral artery on her paralyzed legs, telling her that if she pulls one of them out, she will bleed to death in a matter of minutes. James Gordon Junior calls Dick to mock him and tell him that the reason why he's doing this is because he views human emotion as weakness and wants to get rid of it by turning people into psychopaths. James Gordon Junior also tells Dick he knew he was Batman when he saw Batman smiling in television due to Bruce Wayne not smiling. James Gordon Junior hangs up the phone to kill Barbara Gordon, but Dick saves her in the nick of time, due to him putting a sub-dermal tracer on James Gordon Junior. Commissioner Gordon then captures James Gordon Junior before he can escape, and meets up with Dick to talk about the recent events and what they can hope for the future.

== Critical reception ==
According to Comicbook Roundup, the entire story received an average rating of 8.7 out of 10 based on 126 reviews. Joey Espito from IGN wrote: "By all accounts, from writing to art, "Black Mirror" is a perfect 10 in storytelling, no doubt about it. While some unfortunate production issues on the hardcover keep the collection from being flawless, this is still a must-own piece of Dark Knight history".

== Collected editions ==
Title	Material collected	Published date	ISBN
Batman: The Black Mirror	Detective Comics #871-881	November 2012	978-0606268417
Batman Noir: The Black Mirror	Detective Comics #871-881 (pencils and inks only)	March 2016	978-1401259686
Absolute Batman: The Black Mirror	Detective Comics #871-881	May 2019	978-1401289553
