= Official DC Index =

Series of comic books

The Official DC Index is a series of comic books released by Independent Comics Group (an imprint of Eclipse Comics) from 1985 to 1988, which featured synopses of several DC Comics series. The books, edited by Murray Ward, would often feature background information on the main characters in a particular series, and detailed information on each issue, including writer and artist credits, characters who appeared in the issue, and a story synopsis. A similar series of indices called the Official Marvel Index was published by Marvel Comics.

== Publication history ==
Due to poor sales, some series were cancelled before completion (the All-Star and Legion indices), and a planned Legends index was never released.

== Titles published ==
=== The Official Teen Titans Index ===
Five issues: August–December 1985. Covers by Chuck Patton (issues #1-3, 5) and Rick Hoberg (#4). Profiles of every Titans member and synopses of every Teen Titans story up through early 1986 (a sixth issue was in the works, but was never released):

- The Brave and the Bold #54, 60
- Showcase #59, 75
- Teen Titans #1-53
- DC Super Stars #1
- The Hawk and the Dove #1-6
- DC Comics Presents #26
- The New Teen Titans #1-40
- The New Teen Titans Annual #1, 2
- The Best of DC #18
- Tales of the New Teen Titans #1-4
- Marvel and DC Present: The Uncanny X-Men and The New Teen Titans #1
- The New Teen Titans (drug awareness giveaway) #1-3
- Tales of the Teen Titans #41-62
- Tales of the Teen Titans Annual #3
- The New Teen Titans vol. 2 #1-16
- The New Teen Titans Annual vol. 2 #1

=== The Official Doom Patrol Index ===
Two issues: February 1986. Covers by John Byrne. Profiles of the Doom Patrol members and their supporting cast and villains, and synopses of every Doom Patrol story from:

- My Greatest Adventure #80-85
- Doom Patrol #86-124
- Showcase #94-96
- DC Special Blue Ribbon Digest #19

=== The Official Crisis on Infinite Earths Index ===
One issue: March 1986. Synopses of all 12 issues of the Crisis mini-series and features a cover by George Pérez. The information in this book was reprinted and updated in Crisis on Infinite Earths: The Absolute Edition.

=== The Official Justice League of America Index ===
Eight issues: April 1986 - March 1987. Covers by George Pérez (#1, 2), Stan Woch and Will Blyberg (#3, 4), Joe Staton (#5, 7), Jerry Ordway (#6), and Luke McDonnell (#8). Profiles of every Justice League member and synopses of all issues of the first Justice League of America series as well as the League's initial appearances:

- The Brave and the Bold #28-30
- Justice League of America #1-261
- Justice League of America Annual #1-3
- Red Tornado #1-4
- Zatanna Special #1 (1987)
- 100-Page Super Spectacular #DC-6, DC-17
- Limited Collectors' Edition #C-41 and C-46
- DC Special Blue Ribbon Digest #11
- The Best of DC #31.

=== The Official Crisis on Infinite Earths Crossover Index ===
One issue: July 1986. Brief synopses of all official (and a few unofficial) Crisis crossovers, as well as a detailed index of DC Comics Presents #94. Also included are synopses of the major Earths in the Multiverse, a list of pre-Crisis Monitor appearances, a list of the characters who appeared in Crisis, a Crisis flowchart, and addenda and errata to the Crisis Index. The information in this book was reprinted and updated in Crisis on Infinite Earths: The Absolute Edition. Cover by Jan Duursema and Tom Mandrake.

=== The Official Hawkman Index ===
Two issues: November–December 1986. Covers by Richard Howell. Synopses of every Silver Age Hawkman story from:

- The Brave and the Bold #34-36, 42-44
- Mystery in Space #87-90
- Hawkman #1-27
- Atom and Hawkman #39-45
- Detective Comics #428, 434, 446, 452, 454, 455, 467, 479, 480, 500
- Showcase #101-103
- World's Finest Comics #256-259, 261, 262, 264–270, 272–277, 279-282
- Shadow War of Hawkman #1-4
- Hawkman Special #1
- Hawkman vol. 2 #1-6

=== The Official Legion of Super-Heroes Index ===
Five issues: December 1986 - May 1987. Covers by Curt Swan (#1, 2), Jim Mooney (#3, 4), and Richard Howell (#5). Profiles of almost every Legion member up to the time of publication, and synopses of every Legion story up through July 1970 (the series was put on hiatus before further stories could be indexed):

- Adventure Comics #247, 267, 282, 290, 293, 300-380
- Action Comics #267, 276, 287, 289, 377-390
- Superboy #86, 89, 98, 147
- Superman #147, 152, 155

=== The All-Star Index ===
One issue: February 1987. Cover by Richard Howell. Profiles of every member of the Justice Society of America, and synopses of the first four issues of All-Star Comics, as well as the Justice Society's origin from DC Special #29. This book contains very few synopses due to the large number of Justice Society profiles, and the series' cancellation prevented further issues from being indexed.

=== Millennium Index ===
Two issues: March 1988. Covers by Joe Staton. Synopses of the Millennium mini-series, as well as every crossover:

- Millennium #1-8
- Flash vol. 2 #8, 9
- Firestorm vol. 2 #67, 68
- Justice League International #9, 10
- The Outsiders #27, 28
- Wonder Woman vol. 2 #12, 13
- Batman #415
- Blue Beetle #20, 21
- Legion of Super-Heroes vol. 3 #42, 43
- Superman vol. 2 #13, 14
- Secret Origins vol. 2 #22, 23
- Young All-Stars #8, 9
- Green Lantern Corps #220, 221
- Adventures of Superman #436, 437
- Booster Gold #24, 25
- Infinity Inc. #46, 47
- Suicide Squad #9
- Captain Atom #11
- Detective Comics #582
- The Spectre vol. 2 #10, 11
- Action Comics #596
- Teen Titans Spotlight #18, 19

== See also ==
- Official Marvel Index
- Who's Who in the DC Universe
