= DC Comics Absolute Edition =

Series of archival quality printings of graphic novels

Absolute Sandman Volume 1

DC Comics Absolute Edition is a series of archival quality printings of graphic novels published by DC Comics and its imprints WildStorm and Vertigo. Each is presented in a hardcover and slipcased edition with cloth bookmark consisting of one or more books which include restored, corrected and recolored versions of the original work, reprinted at 8 by 12 inches (200 mm × 300 mm). Also included are supplemental materials regarding the creation of the work, including sketches, comic scripts and memos.

== Titles ==
The following titles in the series have been released or announced.

=== The Authority ===
- Absolute Authority Vol. 1 – collects The Authority #1–12. Released in 2002. ISBN 1-56389-882-9. Currently out of print.
  - Absolute Authority Vol. 1 (New Edition) – collects The Authority #1–12, Planetary/The Authority: Ruling the World, and a story from Wildstorm: A Celebration of 25 Years. Release date: October 17, 2017. ISBN 978-1-4012-7647-8
- Absolute Authority Vol. 2 – collects The Authority # 13–20, 22, & 27–29. Released in 2003. ISBN 1-4012-0097-4. Currently out of print.
  - Absolute Authority Vol. 2 (New Edition) – collects The Authority #13–29, Authority Annual 2000 and stories from Wildstorm Summer Special. Introduction by Tim Miller. Release date: July 31, 2018. ISBN 978-1-4012-8115-1

=== Batman ===
- Absolute Batman: Hush – reprinting "Batman: Hush" storyline from Batman #608–619. This absolute volume includes additional sketches and character designs by Jim Lee. Release date: October 1, 2005. ISBN 1-4012-0426-0
- Absolute Batman: Incorporated – reprints Batman Incorporated (vol. 1) #1–8, Batman Incorporated: Leviathan Rises, Batman, Incorporated (vol. 2) #1–13, and Batman Incorporated Special. Release date: January 7, 2015. ISBN 978-1-4012-0426-6
- Absolute Batman: The Court of Owls – collects Batman #1–11. Includes bonus material. Release date: December 8, 2015. ISBN 978-1-4012-5910-5
- Absolute Batman: Year One – collects Batman #404–407. Includes complete scripts and pencil breakdowns for all four issues and more. Release date: November 8, 2016. ISBN 978-1-4012-4379-1
- Absolute Batman: The Killing Joke (30th Anniversary Edition) – collects Batman: The Killing Joke in both the original coloring by John Higgins and the updated coloring by Brian Bolland, Batman: Black and White #4, the complete script by Alan Moore, and additional Joker artwork by Brian Bolland. Release date: September 11, 2018. ISBN 978-1-4012-8412-1
- Absolute Batman: The Black Mirror – collects Detective Comics #871–881. Includes bonus material. Release date: May 28, 2019. ISBN 978-1-4012-8955-3
- Absolute Batman: Arkham Asylum (30th Anniversary Edition) – reprinting of the graphic novel Arkham Asylum: A Serious House on Serious Earth by Grant Morrison with art by Dave McKean. Release date: September 17, 2019. ISBN 978-1-4012-9420-5
- Absolute Batman: Three Jokers – collects Batman: Three Jokers #1–3. Includes bonus material. Release date: June 27, 2023. 978-1-77952-182-8
- Absolute Batman and Son by Grant Morrison - collects Batman #655-658, #663-669, #672-675, and Batman Incorporated (vol. 2) #5. Includes an introduction from Andy Kubert and other extras. Release date: July 9, 2024. ISBN 978-1-77952-736-3
- Absolute Batman: Death of the Family - collects Detective Comics (The New 52) #1, Batman (The New 52) #13-17, and more. Release date: October 29, 2024. ISBN 978-1-77952-830-8
- Absolute Batman: Zero Year - collects Batman: Zero Year #0, #21-27, #29-33, and Batman: Zero Year Director's Cut #1. Release date: February 4, 2025. ISBN 978-1-7995-0023-0
- Absolute Batman: R.I.P. - collects Batman #676-683, #701-702 and DC Universe #0. Release date: March 3, 2026. ISBN 978-1-7995-0760-4
- Batman by Darwyn Cooke: Absolute Edition - collects Batman: Ego, Catwoman: Selina’s Big Score, Detective Comics #759–762, Catwoman #1–4, Batman: Gotham Knights #23 and #33, Solo #1 and #5, Batman/The Spirit #1, Batwing #24, #26–27, Harley Quinn #0, New Talent Showcase #19, Harley Quinn Holiday Special #1 and Batman: Ego and Other Tails Deluxe Edition #1. Release date: October 20, 2026. ISBN 978-1-7995-0778-9
- Batman: White Knight: Absolute Edition - collects Batman: White Knight #-1-6. Release date: May 5, 2026. ISBN 978-1-7995-0798-7
- Absolute Batman and Robin by Grant Morrison - collects Batman & Robin #1-16, Batman: The Return #1, Batman: The Return of Bruce Wayne #1-6. Includes bonus material. Release date: June 2, 2026. ISBN 978-1-7995-0847-2
- Batman by Neal Adams: Absolute Edition 1967-1970 - collects Batman #219; Detective Comics #395, #397, #400, #402; World’s Finest Comics #175–176; The Brave and the Bold #79–86. Release date: September 1, 2026. ISBN 978-1-7995-0870-0
- Batman by Neal Adams: Absolute Edition 1970-1996 - collects Detective Comics #404, #407-408, and #410; Batman #232, #234, #237, #243-245, #251, and #255; Power Records PR-27 and PR-30. Also includes a new foreword by Walt Simonson and a cover and pinup gallery featuring Batman-related works by Adams. Release date: June 15, 2027. ISBN 978-1-79951057-4
- Batman: Gotham by Gaslight: Absolute Edition – collects Gotham by Gaslight #1 and Batman: Master of the Future #1. Release date: November 24, 2026. ISBN 978-1-7995-0920-2

==== The Long Halloween ====
- Absolute Batman: The Long Halloween – reprints Batman: The Long Halloween #1–13, and includes an introduction/interview with Batman Begins filmmakers Christopher Nolan and David S. Goyer, an interview and commentary by Jeph Loeb and Tim Sale, and four new pages inserted into the story. Release date: April 4, 2007. ISBN 1-4012-1282-4
- Absolute Batman: Dark Victory – reprints Batman: Dark Victory #0–13. Release date: May 23, 2012. ISBN 1-4012-3510-7
- Absolute Batman: Haunted Knight – collects Batman: Legends of the Dark Knight Halloween Special, Batman: Madness – A Legends of the Dark Knight Halloween Special, Batman: Ghosts – A Legends of the Dark Knight Halloween Special and Catwoman: When in Rome #1–6. Includes additional design, sketch and script pages. Release date: December 2, 2014. ISBN 978-1-4012-5122-2

==== The Dark Knight ====
- Absolute The Dark Knight – collects Batman: The Dark Knight Returns and Batman: The Dark Knight Strikes Again by Frank Miller. Extras include character design sketches. Release date: August 23, 2006. ISBN 1-4012-1079-1
  - Absolute The Dark Knight (New Edition) – collects Batman: The Dark Knight Returns #1–4 and Batman: The Dark Knight Strikes Again #1–3. Includes bonus design and story pages. Release date: September 8, 2020. ISBN 978-1-77950-662-7
- Absolute Batman: The Dark Knight: The Master Race – collects the nine-issue miniseries and all nine tie-in issues, as well as some previously unpublished material. Release date: December 10, 2019. ISBN 978-1-4012-9962-0

=== Batman and Robin ===
- Absolute Batman and Robin: Batman Reborn – reprints Batman and Robin #1–16 and Batman: The Return #1. Release date: January 15, 2013. ISBN 1-4012-3737-1
- Absolute All-Star Batman and Robin, the Boy Wonder – collects All Star Batman & Robin, the Boy Wonder #1–10. Includes bonus material. Release date: July 8, 2014. ISBN 978-1-4012-4763-8

=== Crisis on Infinite Earths ===
- Crisis on Infinite Earths: The Absolute Edition – unlike most of the other Absolute Editions which are a single slipcased book, this was a set of two volumes, with the separate 96-page book Crisis on Infinite Earths: The Compendium containing most of the supplementary material. In addition to memos, notes, sketches, and commentary by the creators, it includes some of the information from The Official Crisis on Infinite Earths Index #1 and The Official Crisis on Infinite Earths Crossover Index #1, but expanding the number of distinct Earths identified to 114, some of which appeared after Crisis as Elseworlds stories. Also, some Earths that were described in those volumes (such as Alternate Earth-2 and Crossover Earth) were not included. Release date: November 16, 2005 (a second printing was released in 2006). ISBN 1-4012-0712-X
  - Crisis on Infinite Earths: Absolute Edition - Remastered from original art (esp. Jerry Ordway's inks), and recolored per the original comics (by Anthony Tollin, Tom Ziuko, and Carl Gafford). Collects Crisis on Infinite Earths #1-12, History of the DC Universe #1-2, alongside "numerous brand-new essays from creators of the time, and more surprise wonders". Release date: July 7, 2026. ISBN 978-1-79950-120-6

=== Danger Girl ===
- Absolute Danger Girl – contains two volumes in a slipcased hardcover set. A 262-page collection of Danger Girl # 1–7 and a separate 64-page sketchbook. Limited to 3,012 copies, each including a signed and numbered tipped-in plate. Release date: December 17, 2003. ISBN 1-4012-0096-6

=== Dark Nights: Metal ===
- Absolute Dark Nights: Metal – collects Dark Nights: Metal #1–6, Batman: Lost #1, Dark Nights: Metal Director's Cut #1, and Dark Knights Rising: The Wild Hunt #1. Release date: June 28, 2022. ISBN 978-1-77951-527-8
- Absolute Dark Nights: Death Metal – collects Dark Nights: Death Metal #1–7. Release date: November 8, 2022. ISBN 978-1-77951-527-8

=== Daytripper ===
- Absolute Daytripper – collects Daytripper #1–10. Release date: April 21, 2020. ISBN 978-1-4012-8763-4

=== DC: The New Frontier ===
- Absolute DC: The New Frontier – collects DC: The New Frontier #1–6 with 13 all-new pages. It also includes annotations, cover gallery, sketchbook and notes. Release date: October 4, 2006. ISBN 978-1-4012-1080-9
  - Absolute DC: The New Frontier 15th Anniversary Edition – collects DC: The New Frontier #1–6 with the 13 additional story pages from the previous edition, Justice League: The New Frontier Special, a "New Frontier" story from Solo #5, and features over 50 pages of designs, sketches and preliminary artwork from Darwyn Cooke. Release date: November 26, 2019. ISBN 978-1-77950-139-4

=== Final Crisis ===
- Absolute Final Crisis – collects Final Crisis #1–7, Final Crisis: Submit #1, Final Crisis: Superman Beyond #1–2, Batman #682–683, Final Crisis #1 Director's Cut as well as additional J. G. Jones design pages with commentary by Grant Morrison. Release date: November 6, 2012. ISBN 978-1-4012-3511-6

=== Flashpoint ===
- Absolute Flashpoint – Collects Flashpoint #1–5. Includes scripts, design sketches and more. Release date: January 15, 2019. ISBN 978-1-4012-8626-2

=== Fourth World ===
- Absolute Fourth World by Jack Kirby Vol. 1 – collects Superman's Pal Jimmy Olsen #133–139 and #141–145, The New Gods #1–6, The Forever People #1–6, Mister Miracle #1–6. Release date: June 30, 2020. ISBN 978-1-77950-086-1
- Absolute Fourth World by Jack Kirby Vol. 2 – collects Superman's Pal Jimmy Olsen #146–148, The Forever People #7–11, The New Gods #7–11, Mister Miracle #7–18, Jack Kirby's New Gods (reprint series) #6, DC Graphic Novel #4: The Hunger Dogs and Kirby's On the Road to Armagetto. Also includes a new foreword by Tom Scioli, a gallery of pencil artwork by Kirby and essays by Kirby and Mark Evanier. Release date: January 18, 2022. ISBN 978-1-77951-333-5

=== Green Arrow ===
- Absolute Green Arrow – collects Green Arrow (vol. 3) #1–15 by Kevin Smith and Phil Hester. Release date: April 7, 2015. ISBN 978-1-4012-5548-0

=== Green Lantern ===
- Absolute Green Lantern: Rebirth – collects Green Lantern: Rebirth #1–6. Release date: April 27, 2010. ISBN 978-1-4012-2574-2
- Absolute Green Lantern: Sinestro Corps War – collects Green Lantern #21–25, Green Lantern Corps #14–19 and Green Lantern: Sinestro Corps Special #1. Released in September 2012. ISBN 978-1-4012-3735-6

==== Blackest Night ====
- Absolute Blackest Night – collects Blackest Night #0, Blackest Night #1–8, Untold Tales of the Blackest Night #1, DC Universe #0, Blackest Night Director's Cut #1, and Green Lantern #43–48 and 50–52. Release date: June 26, 2013. ISBN 978-1-4012-4073-8
  - Absolute Blackest Night (New Edition) – collects Blackest Night #0, Blackest Night #1–8, Untold Tales of the Blackest Night #1, DC Universe #0, Blackest Night Director's Cut #1, and Green Lantern #43–48 and 50–52. Release date: May 19, 2026. ISBN 978-1-7995-0797-0

=== Green Lantern/Green Arrow ===
- Absolute Green Lantern/Green Arrow – collects the early 1970s team-up stories written by Dennis O'Neil with art by Neal Adams. Includes scripts, character development pages and character sketches. Release date: December 29, 2015. ISBN 978-1-4012-5796-5

=== Identity Crisis ===
- Absolute Identity Crisis – collects Identity Crisis #1–7 by Brad Meltzer and Rags Morales. Release date: October 18, 2011. ISBN 978-1-4012-3258-0

=== Infinite Crisis ===
- Absolute Infinite Crisis – collects Infinite Crisis #1–7 by Geoff Johns and Ivan Reis, George Pérez, Phil Jimenez, Joe Bennett, Jerry Ordway. Release date: December 7, 2016. ISBN 978-1-4012-6535-9

=== Justice League ===
- Absolute Justice League: Origin – reprinting Justice League: Origin, part of The New 52, by Geoff Johns and Jim Lee. Release date: October 3, 2017. ISBN 978-1-4012-7437-5
- Absolute Justice League: The World's Greatest Super-Heroes – reprinting Justice League: The World's Greatest Super-Heroes by Paul Dini and Alex Ross. First edition released in July 2005. Second edition released on November 7, 2017. ISBN 978-1-4012-7370-5

==== Justice ====
- Absolute Justice – reprinting Justice by Jim Krueger and Alex Ross. Release date: November 17, 2009. ISBN 978-1-4012-2415-8
  - Absolute Justice (New Edition) – collects Justice by Jim Krueger and Alex Ross. Release date: October 16, 2018. ISBN 978-1779527585

=== Kingdom Come ===
- Absolute Kingdom Come – collects Kingdom Come #1–4 by Alex Ross and Mark Waid. Release date: January 13, 2012. ISBN 978-1-4012-0768-7. This special edition contains additional history pages showing Superman traveling to Apokolips for help, finding it being ruled by a new tyrant. These pages were not printed in regular edition. At the end of the book some original pages of a showdown between Bat-Mite and Mister Mxyzptlk are offered as a complement, as well the original "epilogue" not found at the regular editions is printed here, called "One Year Later". Additional and extended "Apocrypha" section (originally shown at TPB editions as "Apocrypha" and "Revelations") where each hero and villain is identified, along with detailed sketches and excerpts by Alex Ross, original art for trading cards, posters, and action figures.
  - Absolute Kingdom Come (New Edition) – collects Kingdom Come #1–4 by Alex Ross and Mark Waid. Release date: November 19, 2024. ISBN 978-1-4012-8462-6

=== The League of Extraordinary Gentlemen ===
- The League of Extraordinary Gentlemen Vol. I: Absolute Edition – two-book slipcase which collects The League of Extraordinary Gentlemen, Volume One #1–6 in the first book and a second book which contains scripts for each of the issues as well as penciled original art and production sketches. Release date: June 18, 2003. ISBN 1-4012-0052-4
- The League of Extraordinary Gentlemen Vol. II: Absolute Edition – two-book slipcase which collects The League of Extraordinary Gentlemen, Volume II #1–6 in the first book and a second book which contains scripts for each of the issues as well as penciled original art and production sketches. Release date: August 1, 2005. ISBN 1-4012-0611-5
- The League of Extraordinary Gentlemen Black Dossier: Absolute Edition – collects the original graphic novel The League of Extraordinary Gentlemen: Black Dossier. Besides the slipcase, no bonus material whatsoever except for two new endpapers (one in 3-D) by series artist Kevin O'Neill. DC solicited the title with an LP that was originally intended by the authors for inclusion in the hardcover release, but reneged on the deal. Release date: August 12, 2008. ISBN 1-4012-0751-0

=== Mister Miracle ===
- Absolute Mister Miracle – collects Mister Miracle #1–12 by Tom King and Mitch Gerad, original script pages and concept art, creator commentary, and a newly commissioned cover illustrated by Gerad. Release date: November 12, 2024. ISBN: TBD

=== Multiversity ===
- Absolute Multiversity – collects The Multiversity #1–2, The Multiversity Guidebook #1, Multiversity: The Society of Super Heroes #1, Multiversity: The Just #1, Multiversity: Pax Americana #1, Multiversity: Thunderworld #1, Multiversity: Mastermen #1 and Multiversity: Ultra Comics #1. Release date: July 19, 2022. ISBN 978-1-77951-561-2

=== Planetary ===
- Absolute Planetary Book One – collects Planetary #1–12. Release date: January 1, 2005. ISBN 1-4012-0327-2
  - Absolute Planetary Book One (New Edition) – collects Planetary #1–12. Includes the full script from issue #1. Release date: July 13, 2010. ISBN 978-1-4012-0327-6
- Absolute Planetary Book Two – collects Planetary #13–27. Release date: July 7, 2010. ISBN 1-4012-2701-5
  - Absolute Planetary Book Two (New Edition) – collects Planetary #13–27. Includes 14 pages of additional content. Release date: July 20, 2010. ISBN 978-1-4012-2701-2
- Absolute Planetary – collects Planetary #1–27, Planetary Vol. 1: All Over the World and Other Stories, Planetary/Batman: Night On Earth #1, Planetary Vol. 2: The Fourth Man, Planetary: All Over the World and Other Stories, Planetary: Crossing Worlds, Planetary Vol. 3: Leaving the 20th Century, Absolute Planetary Vol. 1 and Vol. 2, Planetary Vol. 4: Spacetime Archaeology, Wildstorm: A Celebration of 25 Years. Release date: February 9, 2021. ISBN 978-1-77950-907-9

=== Preacher ===
- Absolute Preacher Book One – collects Preacher #1–26. Release date: July 12, 2016. ISBN 978-1-4012-6441-3
- Absolute Preacher Book Two – collects Preacher #27–40. Release date: May 9, 2017. ISBN 978-1-4012-6809-1
- Absolute Preacher Book Three – collects Preacher #41–66. Release date: April 25, 2018. ISBN 978-1-4012-7848-9

=== Promethea ===
- Absolute Promethea Book One – collects Promethea #1–12 by Alan Moore and J. H. Williams III. Release date: September 30, 2009. ISBN 978-1-4012-2372-4
- Absolute Promethea Book Two – collects Promethea #13–23. Release date: September 29, 2010. ISBN 978-1-4012-2842-2
- Absolute Promethea Book Three – collects Promethea #24–32 (issue #32 is included as both a comic and a standalone poster), an excerpt of Tom Strong #36, an excerpt of America's Best Comics 64 Page Giant Special, an excerpt of Tomorrow Stories Special #2, and Little Margie in Misty Magic Land #1–2 by Steve Moore and Eric Shanower. Release date: December 20, 2011. ISBN 978-1-4012-2947-4

=== Ronin ===
- Absolute Ronin – collects Ronin #1–6. Release date: September 30, 2008. ISBN 978-1-4012-1908-6

=== Sandman ===
- Absolute Sandman Vol. 1 – collects The Sandman #1–20. Extras include Neil Gaiman's original series pitch, character designs charting the visual development of Dream, script and pencils for The Sandman #19 ("A Midsummer Night's Dream"), and Gaiman's prose summary of the first seven issues from The Sandman #8, which features story beats not in the original comics. Release date: October 11, 2006. ISBN 1-4012-1082-1
- Absolute Sandman Vol. 2 – collects The Sandman #21–39. Extras include the Desire story "The Flowers of Romance" from Vertigo: Winter's Edge #1, script and pencils for The Sandman #23 ("Season of Mists: Chapter Two"), humorous biographies of the contributors, a section on DC's official "Sandman Month", a prose story from the box of the first Sandman statue detailing the statue's (fictional) history, and a complete reproduction of A Gallery of Dreams (a one-shot of Sandman-inspired art). Release date: October 11, 2007. ISBN 978-1-4012-1083-0
- Absolute Sandman Vol. 3 – collects The Sandman #40–56, "Fear of Falling" from Vertigo Preview #1, and Sandman Special #1. Extras include the Desire story "How They Met Themselves" from Vertigo: Winter's Edge #3, script and thumbnails from The Sandman #50 ("Ramadan"), art galleries from The Sandman #50 and Sandman Special #1, a gallery of works inspired by the Endless, a section on Jill Thompson's "Little Endless" series, and a gallery of statues inspired by The Sandman #50. Release date: June 11, 2008. ISBN 978-1-4012-1084-7
- Absolute Sandman Vol. 4 – collects The Sandman #57–75 (including three "lost" pages from The Sandman #72, originally published in The Dreaming #8) and "The Castle" from Vertigo Jam #1. Extras include script and developmental art for The Sandman #57 ("The Kindly Ones: Part One") and #75 ("The Tempest"), a timeline of The Sandman's production from Gaiman's initial pitch to the publication of the last issue, and sections on the merchandise inspired by The Sandman. Release date: November 18, 2008. ISBN 978-1-4012-1085-4
- Absolute Sandman Vol. 5 – collects "The Last Sandman Story" from Dust Covers: The Collected Sandman Covers, The Sandman: The Dream Hunters (both the prose version, written by Gaiman and illustrated by Yoshitaka Amano, and the four-issue comics adaptation by P. Craig Russell), The Sandman: Endless Nights, and Sandman Midnight Theatre #1, featuring Wesley Dodds. Extras include script, designs, and layouts for "The Heart of a Star" from Endless Nights, covers and sketches from the comics adaptation of The Dream Hunters, a gallery of Sandman-inspired posters, and a section on the figures and statues inspired by The Sandman. Release date: November 8, 2011. ISBN 978-1-4012-3202-3

==== Death ====
- Absolute Death – collects The Sandman #8 ("The Sound of Her Wings") and #20 ("Facade"), Death: The High Cost of Living #1–3, Death: The Time of Your Life #1–3, "A Winter's Tale" from Vertigo: Winter's Edge #2, "The Wheel" from 9–11: The World's Finest Comic Book Writers & Artists Tell Stories to Remember, and "Death and Venice" from The Sandman: Endless Nights. Extras include the "Death Talks About Life" AIDS pamphlet, script and pencils for The Sandman #8, a complete reproduction of Death Gallery (a one-shot of Death-inspired art), a section on the collectibles inspired by Death, sketches by Chris Bachalo, and an introduction by Amanda Palmer. Release date: January 7, 2020. ISBN 978-1-4012-9557-8

==== Overture ====
- Absolute Sandman: Overture – collects The Sandman: Overture #1–6. Extras include the script for The Sandman: Overture #1 ("Chapter 1: A flower burns"), sections on Dave Stewart's coloring process, Todd Klein's lettering process, and Dave McKean's cover art process, interviews with the creative team, and art by J. H. Williams. Release date: June 27, 2018. ISBN 978-1-4012-8047-5

=== Scarlet ===
- Absolute Scarlet – collects Scarlet #1–10. Release date: April 16, 2019. ISBN 978-1-4012-8972-0

=== Superman ===
- Absolute Superman: For Tomorrow – reprinting the Superman: For Tomorrow arc from Superman #204–215 by Brian Azzarello and Jim Lee. Release date: May 5, 2009. Features original 2-page origin story (later published online). ISBN 978-1-4012-2198-0
- Absolute All-Star Superman – reprinting the All-Star Superman series by Grant Morrison and Frank Quitely. Release date: October 26, 2010. ISBN 978-1-4012-2917-7
- Absolute Superman: For All Seasons – reprinting the Superman: For All Seasons series by Jeff Loeb and Tim Sale. Release date: August 29, 2023. ISBN 978-1-77952-288-7
- Absolute Superman by Geoff Johns & Gary Frank - reprinting the complete Superman and the Legion of Super-Heroes, Superman: Brainiac, and Superman: Secret Origin stories from Action Comics #858-863, #866-870, Superman: Secret Origin #1-6, and stories from Action Comics Annual #10, Superman: New Krypton Special #1, and Action Comics #900. Extras include character designs by Gary Frank, the Action Comics #858 script by Geoff Johns, an extensive cover gallery and more. Release date: May 28, 2024. ISBN 978-1-77952-471-3
- Absolute Superman: Red Son – reprinting Superman: Red Son series by Mark Millar. Release date: May 27, 2025. ISBN 978-1-7995-0155-8
- Death of Superman: Absolute Edition – reprinting The Death of Superman storyline. Release date: November 25, 2025. ISBN 978-1-7995-0174-9
- Superman: The Man of Steel by John Byrne: Absolute Edition - collects The Man of Steel #1-6. Bonus material included. Release date: July 21, 2026. ISBN 978-1-7995-0818-2
- Superman by Alan Moore: Absolute Edition - collects Superman #423, Action Comics #583, DC Comics Presents #85, Superman Annual #11, The Super Heroes Annual (1984) and Superman Official Annual (1985). Release date: April 20, 2027. ISBN 978-1-7995-1404-6

=== Superman/Batman ===
- Absolute Superman/Batman Vol. 1 – collects Superman/Batman #1–13. Release date: September 3, 2013. ISBN 978-1-4012-4096-7
- Absolute Superman/Batman Vol. 2 – collects Superman/Batman #14–26. Extras include pencilled pages and character sketches. Release date: May 20, 2014. ISBN 978-1-4012-4817-8

==== Luthor/Joker ====
- Absolute Luthor/Joker – contains two volumes in a slipcase hardcover set by Brian Azzarello and Lee Bermejo collecting the Lex Luthor: Man of Steel miniseries and Joker graphic novel. Release date: October 29, 2013. ISBN 978-1-4012-4504-7

=== Swamp Thing ===
- Absolute Swamp Thing by Len Wein & Bernie Wrightson – collects House of Secrets #92 and Swamp Thing #1–13. Release date: November 08, 2022. ISBN 978-1-77951-730-2

==== Saga of the Swamp Thing ====
- Absolute Swamp Thing by Alan Moore Vol. 1 – collects Saga of the Swamp Thing #20–34 and Swamp Thing Annual #2. Release date: October 22, 2019. ISBN 978-1-4012-8493-0
- Absolute Swamp Thing by Alan Moore Vol. 2 – collects Saga of the Swamp Thing #35–49. Release date: October 27, 2020. ISBN 978-1-77950-282-7
- Absolute Swamp Thing by Alan Moore Vol. 3 – collects Saga of the Swamp Thing #51–64 and DC Comics Presents #85. Release date: March 25, 2022. ISBN 978-1-77951-219-2

=== The Demon ===
- The Demon by Jack Kirby: Absolute Edition – collects Who’s Who: The Definitive Directory of the DC Universe #6; The Demon #1–16. Release date: October 27, 2026. ISBN 978-1-79950-902-8

=== Top 10 ===
- Absolute Top 10 – collects Top 10 #1–12, Smax #1–5, a selection from America's Best Comics Special #1 and the graphic novel Top 10: The Forty-Niners. Release date: June 4, 2013. ISBN 978-1-4012-3825-4

=== Transmetropolitan ===
- Absolute Transmetropolitan Vol. 1 – collects Transmetropolitan #1–18, Transmetropolitan: I Hate it Here and Vertigo Winter's Edge #2. Release date: June 16, 2015. ISBN 978-1-4012-5430-8
- Absolute Transmetropolitan Vol. 2 – collects Transmetropolitan #19–39 and Filth of the City. Release date: May 24, 2016. ISBN 978-1-4012-6115-3
- Absolute Transmetropolitan Vol. 3 – collects Transmetropolitan #40–60, a new introduction by series author Warren Ellis and "a host of redacted extras from recently decrypted files". Release date: November 13, 2018. ISBN 978-1-4012-8545-6

=== V for Vendetta ===
- Absolute V for Vendetta – reprinting V for Vendetta by Alan Moore and David Lloyd. Release date: September 2, 2009. ISBN 978-1-4012-2361-8

=== Watchmen ===
- Absolute Watchmen – reprinting Watchmen by Alan Moore and Dave Gibbons. The supplemental material for this volume is reprinted from the limited edition Watchmen hardcover published by Graphitti Designs in 1987. It includes background on characters, the original creation process as well as brief essays by Alan Moore and Dave Gibbons. Originally released on October 5, 2005, (ISBN 978-1-4012-0713-7) it (along with other editions and material) was re-released on November 12, 2008, about six months ahead of the film adaptation.

==== Doomsday Clock ====
- Absolute Doomsday Clock – collects Doomsday Clock #1–12. Also includes bonus material including a cover gallery, sketchbook, notes and selected commentary from creators Geoff Johns, Gary Frank and Brad Anderson. Release date: October 4, 2022. ISBN 978-1-77951-560-5

=== WildC.A.T.s ===
- Absolute WildC.A.T.s by Jim Lee – collects WildC.A.T.s #1–13, 31, 50; Cyberforce #1–3; WildC.A.T.s/X-MEN: The Silver Age #1; WildC.A.T.s Adventures #1 and WILDCATS (WorldStorm) #1 by Jim Lee. Includes sketches, concept designs and variant covers. Release date: March 13, 2018. ISBN 978-1-4012-7495-5
  - Absolute WildC.A.T.s by Jim Lee (2025 Edition) - collects WildC.A.T.s #1–13, 31, 50; Cyberforce #1–3; WildC.A.T.s/X-MEN: The Silver Age #1; WildC.A.T.s Adventures #1 and WILDCATS (WorldStorm) #1, as well as behind-the-scenes sketches, concept designs, and variant covers. Release date: November 18, 2025. ISBN 978-1-7995-0314-9

=== Wonder Woman ===
- Absolute Wonder Woman: Gods and Mortals – collects Wonder Woman (vol. 2) #1-14 by George Pérez, with bonus content from Who's Who: The Definitive Directory of the DC Universe #26 and Who's Who Update '87 #01-03. Release date: March 1, 2022. ISBN 978-1-77951-155-3
- Absolute Wonder Woman by Brian Azzarello & Cliff Chiang Vol. 1 – collects Wonder Woman (vol. 4) #0–18 from The New 52 by Brian Azzarello and Cliff Chiang. Release date: February 1, 2017. ISBN 978-1-4012-6848-0
- Absolute Wonder Woman by Brian Azzarello & Cliff Chiang Vol. 2 – collects Wonder Woman (vol. 4) #19–35, Azzarello's and Chiang's story from Secret Origins (vol. 2) #6 and more. Release date: February 13, 2018. ISBN 978-1-4012-7749-9
- Wonder Woman: Historia: The Amazons: Absolute Edition - collects Wonder Woman: Historia: The Amazons #1-3. Release date: September 8, 2026. ISBN 978-1-7995-0846-5
- Wonder Woman: Dead Earth: Absolute Edition - collects Wonder Woman: Dead Earth #1-4. Release date: April 06, 2027. ISBN 978-1-7995-1403-9

=== Y: The Last Man ===
- Absolute Y: The Last Man Vol. 1 – collects Y: The Last Man #1–20. Release date: July 7, 2015. ISBN 978-1-4012-5429-2
- Absolute Y: The Last Man Vol. 2 – collects Y: The Last Man #21–40. Release date: September 20, 2016. ISBN 978-1-4012-6113-9
- Absolute Y: The Last Man Vol. 3 – collects Y: The Last Man #41–60. Release date: July 4, 2017. ISBN 978-1-4012-7100-8

== Cancelled titles ==
The following titles in the series were previously solicited by DC, but later cancelled.

=== Adam Hughes ===
- Absolute Art of Adam Hughes – originally solicited to feature the best of Eisner Award-winning artist Adam Hughes' covers for DC Comics plus commentary from the artist, rarely seen preliminary material and more. Includes everything from Cover Run: The DC Comics Art of Adam Hughes and more than 100 additional covers with new commentary and set to be released on November 13, 2019. Cancelled. ISBN 978-1-4012-9491-5

=== Batman ===
- Absolute Batman: Gotham by Gaslight – originally solicited to contain the Gotham by Gaslight graphic novel, Countdown Special: The Search for Ray Palmer: Gotham by Gaslight #1 and Convergence: Shazam! #1–2 and set to be released on September 9, 2020. Cancelled. ISBN 978-1-4012-9982-8

=== Fables ===
- Absolute Fables Vol. 1 – originally solicited to contain Fables #1–29, Fables: The Last Castle and the 7-page story collected in Fables: Legends in Exile and set to be released on June 30, 2020. Cancelled. ISBN 978-1-77950-020-5

=== Flash ===
- Absolute Flash: Rebirth – originally solicited to contain The Flash: Rebirth #1–6 and set to be released on May 4, 2021. Cancelled. ISBN 978-1-77950-928-4

== Unofficial titles ==
The following titles are not officially part of the Absolute series, but are similar to actual labeled Absolute editions in terms of their contents and size.

=== Deadman ===
- The Deadman Collection – collects Strange Adventures #205–216 (1950–1973), The Brave and the Bold #79, 86 and 104 (1955–1983), and material from Aquaman #50–52 (1962–1978), and Challengers of the Unknown #74 (1958–1978). This was the second book in the line of oversized DC slipcased hardcovers after The Green Lantern/Green Arrow Collection, though again not as oversized as an Absolute edition. Release date: December 2001. ISBN 1-56389-849-7

=== Green Lantern/Green Arrow ===
- The Green Lantern/Green Arrow Collection – collects the 1970s run by Dennis O'Neil and Neal Adams of Green Lantern (vol. 2) #76–87, #89 and The Flash (vol. 2) #217–219, where Green Lantern and Green Arrow travelled through the United States. Like earlier reprints of this run before and after this hardcover, it did not include The Flash (vol. 2) #226. The book is the first release of what would become the Absolute format, with oversized hardcover comic collections in slipcases, but was not as oversized as the Absolute books. Release date: December 2000. ISBN 1-56389-639-7. The Green Lantern/Green Arrow Collection was later re-released as an official Absolute title, Absolute Green Lantern/Green Arrow, on December 29, 2015. ISBN 978-1-4012-5796-5

=== JLA/Avengers ===
- JLA/Avengers: The Collector's Edition – collects JLA/Avengers #1, 3 and Avengers/JLA #2, 4 in a two-volume (the series and an index, which included the original 1983 JLA/Avengers George Pérez-penciled pages for the first time ever) slipcased hardcover set. Release date: December 1, 2004. ISBN 1-4012-0207-1

== See also ==
- List of comic books on CD/DVD
