= Official Marvel Index =

Series of American comic books

The Official Marvel Index is a series of comic books released by Marvel Comics which featured synopses of several Marvel series. The books were largely compiled by George Olshevsky (who was for fourteen years the sole owner of a complete collection of Marvel superhero comics dating from Marvel Comics #1, published in 1939), and featured detailed information on each issue in a particular series, including writer and artist credits, characters who appeared in the issue, and a story synopsis. A similar series of indices was published for DC Comics.

== Publication history ==
The Official Marvel Index was preceded by the Marvel Comics Index (also compiled by Olshevsky) and distributed by Pacific Comics Distributors sporadically from 1976 to 1982. These books were magazine-sized as opposed to comic-sized.

The first Official Marvel Index titles were published in 1985, and produced regularly through August 1988. A second series of two titles was published in 1994–1995.

In 2008, Marvel announced that a new Marvel Index series would commence publication in 2009. Titled Official Index to the Marvel Universe, the first issue was published in January 2009, with a monthly release schedule. The new series focuses primarily on Marvel's most prominent characters. The first volume ran 14 issues and focused on Spider-Man, Iron Man and the X-Men. The second volume began in May 2010 and focused on the Avengers, Captain America (including Golden Age issues) and Thor (including Journey into Mystery, where Thor premiered). A third started in August 2011, focusing on Wolverine, The Punisher, and Ghost Rider. Each featured title is later collected separately into a digest-sized trade paperback with additional issues not featured in the monthly book.

== Bibliography of Marvel Index series ==
=== The Marvel Comics Index ===
Published by Pacific Comics Distributors 1976 - 1982

Marvel Comics Index #1 - 9B
#	Title	Synopses	Cover artist	Month of publ.	Pages	Orig. price
1	The Amazing Spider-Man	Amazing Adventures #1-6, Amazing Adult Fantasy #7-14, Amazing Fantasy #15, The Amazing Spider-Man #1-151 and Annuals #1-9, The Spectacular Spider-Man Magazine #1-2, Amazing Spider-Man Mini Comic (Eye Magazine promo), Giant-Size Super-Heroes #1, Giant-Size Spider-Man #1-6, and Spidey Super Stories #1-14	Ronn Sutton	January 1976	82	$3.95
2	Conan and the Barbarians	Conan The Barbarian #1-61 and Annual #1, Giant-Size Conan #1-5, Savage Sword of Conan #1-10 and Annual #1, Ka-Zar (1st series) #1-3, Ka-Zar (2nd series) #1-15, Kull the Conqueror #1-15, Kull and the Barbarians #1-3, Savage Tales #11 and Annual #1, Chamber of Chills #1-21, Chamber of Darkness #1-8 and Special #1, Monsters on the Prowl #9-30, Tower of Shadows #1-9 and Annual #1, Creatures on the Loose #10-37, and Worlds Unknown #1-8	Tim Conrad	March 1976	98	$4.50
3	The Avengers, Defenders, and Captain Marvel	All Winners #19 and 21, Mystic Comics #4, Black Knight #1-5, Avengers #1-151 and Annuals #1-5, Giant-Size Avengers #1-5, Captain Marvel #1-46, Giant-Size Captain Marvel #1, Weird Wonder Tales #7, Defenders #1-39, and Giant-Size Defenders #1-5	Neal Adams	August 1976	116	$4.50
4	Fantastic Four	Daring Mystery Comics #6, Marvel Boy #1-2, Astonishing #3-6, Fantastic Four #1-180 and Annuals #1-11, Giant-Size Fantastic Four #1-6, Human Torch #1-8, and Silver Surfer #1-18	Jim Steranko	July 1977	98	$4.95
5	The Mighty Thor	Journey into Mystery #83-125, Thor #126-266 and Annuals #1-6, Giant-Size Thor #1, and Tales of Asgard #1		November 1977	94	$4.50
6	Heroes from Strange Tales	Strange Tales #1, 25, 74, 75, 77, 79, 89, 101–188, and Annuals #1-2, Doctor Strange (1st series) #169-183, Doctor Strange (2nd series) #1-27 and Annual #1, Giant-Size Doctor Strange #1, Nick Fury Agent of S.H.I.E.L.D. #1-18, S.H.I.E.L.D. #1-5, and Warlock #1-15	Tim Conrad	December 1977	94	$3.95
7A	Heroes from Tales to Astonish; Book 1: The Incredible Hulk	Incredible Hulk #1-6, Tales to Astonish #1, 13, 15, 27, and 35–101, Incredible Hulk (vol. 2) #102-227 and Annuals #1-7, Giant-Size Hulk #1, and Rampaging Hulk #1-10	Ken Steacy	June 1978	94	$3.95
7B	Heroes from Tales to Astonish; Book 2: Sub-Mariner	Marvel Mystery Comics #4,10, and 82, Sub-Mariner Comics #1-42, Namora #1-3, Sub-Mariner (1968) #1-72 and Annuals #1-2, Astonishing Tales #1-36, Giant-Size Super-Villain Team-Up #1-2, Super-Villain Team-Up #1-14, Giant-Size Invaders #1, and Invaders #1-32 and Annual #1	Bill Everett / Dean Motter	July 1978	94	$3.95
8A	Heroes from Tales of Suspense; Book 1: Captain America	Captain America Comics, The Yellow Claw #1-4, Tales of Suspense #39-99, Captain America #100-235 and Annuals #1-4, Giant-Size Captain America #1, and Marvel Treasury Special: Captain America's Bicentennial Battles	Jim Steranko	December 1979	102	$5.50
8B	Heroes from Tales of Suspense; Book 2: Iron Man and Others	Iron Man & Sub-Mariner #1, Iron Man #1-118 and Annuals #1-4, Giant-Size Iron Man #1, Amazing Adventures (1970's series) #1-25, Inhumans #1-12, The Claws of the Cat #1-4, Ms. Marvel #1-21, Nova #1-23, Omega the Unknown #1-10, and Skull the Slayer #1-8	Ken Steacy	December 1979	104	$4.50
9A	X-Men	The Uncanny X-Men #1-152 and Annuals #1-5, Giant-Size X-Men #1-2, Amazing Adventures (vol. 3) #1-14, Ghost Rider #1-63, and Champions #1-17	Brent Anderson / Steve Oliff / Terry Austin	April 1982	112	$5.95
9B	Daredevil	Daredevil #1-181 and Annuals/Specials #1-4, Giant-Size Daredevil #1, Marvel Adventure #1-6, Jungle Action/Black Panther #1-24, Black Panther #1-15, Shanna the She-Devil #1-5, Black Goliath #1-5, The Human Fly #1-19, and Dazzler #1-14	Frank Miller / Josef Rubinstein / Steve Oliff	April 1982	110	$5.95
10	Marvel Showcase and Team-Up comics	-	-	listed in issue #9B, but publication cancelled	-	-
11	Short Run Heroes	-	-	listed in issue #9B, but publication cancelled	-	-
12A	Martial Arts Heroes	-	-	listed in issue #9B, but publication cancelled	-	-
12B	War Heroes	-	-	listed in issue #9B, but publication cancelled	-	-
13A	Marvel's Monsters	-	-	listed in issue #9B, but publication cancelled	-	-
13B	Marvel's Vampires	-	-	listed in issue #9B, but publication cancelled	-	-
14	Marvel's Reprint Comics	-	-	listed in issue #9B, but publication cancelled	-	-

=== The Official Marvel Index Vol. I ===
Published by Marvel Comics 1985 - 1988

The Official Marvel Index to the Amazing Spider-Man #1-9
#	Synopses	Month of publ.	Pages	Orig. price
1	Amazing Fantasy #15, The Amazing Spider-Man #1-214, The Amazing Spider-Man Annuals #1-14, The Spectacular Spider-Man Magazine #1-2, Giant-Size Super-Heroes #1, Giant-Size Spider-Man #1-6	April 1985: December 1985	32	$1.00
2	Amazing Fantasy #15, The Amazing Spider-Man #1-214, The Amazing Spider-Man Annuals #1-14, The Spectacular Spider-Man Magazine #1-2, Giant-Size Super-Heroes #1, Giant-Size Spider-Man #1-6	April 1985: December 1985	32	$1.25
3	Amazing Fantasy #15, The Amazing Spider-Man #1-214, The Amazing Spider-Man Annuals #1-14, The Spectacular Spider-Man Magazine #1-2, Giant-Size Super-Heroes #1, Giant-Size Spider-Man #1-6	April 1985: December 1985	32	$1.25
4	Amazing Fantasy #15, The Amazing Spider-Man #1-214, The Amazing Spider-Man Annuals #1-14, The Spectacular Spider-Man Magazine #1-2, Giant-Size Super-Heroes #1, Giant-Size Spider-Man #1-6	April 1985: December 1985	32	$1.25
5	Amazing Fantasy #15, The Amazing Spider-Man #1-214, The Amazing Spider-Man Annuals #1-14, The Spectacular Spider-Man Magazine #1-2, Giant-Size Super-Heroes #1, Giant-Size Spider-Man #1-6	April 1985: December 1985	32	$1.25
6	Amazing Fantasy #15, The Amazing Spider-Man #1-214, The Amazing Spider-Man Annuals #1-14, The Spectacular Spider-Man Magazine #1-2, Giant-Size Super-Heroes #1, Giant-Size Spider-Man #1-6	April 1985: December 1985	32	$1.25
7	Amazing Fantasy #15, The Amazing Spider-Man #1-214, The Amazing Spider-Man Annuals #1-14, The Spectacular Spider-Man Magazine #1-2, Giant-Size Super-Heroes #1, Giant-Size Spider-Man #1-6	April 1985: December 1985	32	$1.25
8	Amazing Fantasy #15, The Amazing Spider-Man #1-214, The Amazing Spider-Man Annuals #1-14, The Spectacular Spider-Man Magazine #1-2, Giant-Size Super-Heroes #1, Giant-Size Spider-Man #1-6	April 1985: December 1985	32	$1.25
9	Amazing Fantasy #15, The Amazing Spider-Man #1-214, The Amazing Spider-Man Annuals #1-14, The Spectacular Spider-Man Magazine #1-2, Giant-Size Super-Heroes #1, Giant-Size Spider-Man #1-6	April 1985: December 1985	32	$1.25

The Official Marvel Index to Fantastic Four #1-12
#	Synopses	Month of publ.	Pages	Orig. price
1	Fantastic Four #1-214, Fantastic Four Annuals #1-13, Giant-Size Super-Stars #1, Giant-Size Fantastic Four #2-6	December 1985: January 1987	32	$1.25
2	Fantastic Four #1-214, Fantastic Four Annuals #1-13, Giant-Size Super-Stars #1, Giant-Size Fantastic Four #2-6	December 1985: January 1987	32	$1.25
3	Fantastic Four #1-214, Fantastic Four Annuals #1-13, Giant-Size Super-Stars #1, Giant-Size Fantastic Four #2-6	December 1985: January 1987	32	$1.25
4	Fantastic Four #1-214, Fantastic Four Annuals #1-13, Giant-Size Super-Stars #1, Giant-Size Fantastic Four #2-6	December 1985: January 1987	32	$1.25
5	Fantastic Four #1-214, Fantastic Four Annuals #1-13, Giant-Size Super-Stars #1, Giant-Size Fantastic Four #2-6	December 1985: January 1987	32	$1.25
6	Fantastic Four #1-214, Fantastic Four Annuals #1-13, Giant-Size Super-Stars #1, Giant-Size Fantastic Four #2-6	December 1985: January 1987	32	$1.25
7	Fantastic Four #1-214, Fantastic Four Annuals #1-13, Giant-Size Super-Stars #1, Giant-Size Fantastic Four #2-6	December 1985: January 1987	32	$1.25
8	Fantastic Four #1-214, Fantastic Four Annuals #1-13, Giant-Size Super-Stars #1, Giant-Size Fantastic Four #2-6	December 1985: January 1987	32	$1.25
9	Fantastic Four #1-214, Fantastic Four Annuals #1-13, Giant-Size Super-Stars #1, Giant-Size Fantastic Four #2-6	December 1985: January 1987	32	$1.25
10	Fantastic Four #1-214, Fantastic Four Annuals #1-13, Giant-Size Super-Stars #1, Giant-Size Fantastic Four #2-6	December 1985: January 1987	32	$1.25
11	Fantastic Four #1-214, Fantastic Four Annuals #1-13, Giant-Size Super-Stars #1, Giant-Size Fantastic Four #2-6	December 1985: January 1987	32	$1.25
12	Fantastic Four #1-214, Fantastic Four Annuals #1-13, Giant-Size Super-Stars #1, Giant-Size Fantastic Four #2-6	December 1985: January 1987	32	$1.25

The Official Marvel Index to Marvel Team-Up #1-6
#	Synopses	Month of publ.	Pages	Orig. price
1	Marvel Team-Up #1-112, Marvel Team-Up Annuals #1-4	January 1986: July 1987	32	$1.25
2	Marvel Team-Up #1-112, Marvel Team-Up Annuals #1-4	January 1986: July 1987	32	$1.25
3	Marvel Team-Up #1-112, Marvel Team-Up Annuals #1-4	January 1986: July 1987	32	$1.25
4	Marvel Team-Up #1-112, Marvel Team-Up Annuals #1-4	January 1986: July 1987	32	$1.25
5	Marvel Team-Up #1-112, Marvel Team-Up Annuals #1-4	January 1986: July 1987	32	$1.25
6	Marvel Team-Up #1-112, Marvel Team-Up Annuals #1-4	January 1986: July 1987	32	$1.25

The Official Marvel Index to X-Men #1-7
#	Synopses	Month of publ.	Pages	Orig. price
1	Uncanny X-Men #1-138, Uncanny X-Men Annuals #1-3, Ka-Zar #2-3, Marvel Tales #30, Amazing Adventures (vol. 2) #11-17, X-Men Classics #1-3, Giant-Size X-Men #1-2, Classic X-Men #1-21, Marvel Treasury Edition #26-27, Bizarre Adventures #27, Incredible Hulk and Wolverine #1, Phoenix: The Untold Story #1, Amazing Adventures (vol. 3) #1-14	May 1987: July 1988	48	$2.95
2	Uncanny X-Men #1-138, Uncanny X-Men Annuals #1-3, Ka-Zar #2-3, Marvel Tales #30, Amazing Adventures (vol. 2) #11-17, X-Men Classics #1-3, Giant-Size X-Men #1-2, Classic X-Men #1-21, Marvel Treasury Edition #26-27, Bizarre Adventures #27, Incredible Hulk and Wolverine #1, Phoenix: The Untold Story #1, Amazing Adventures (vol. 3) #1-14	May 1987: July 1988	48	$2.95
3	Uncanny X-Men #1-138, Uncanny X-Men Annuals #1-3, Ka-Zar #2-3, Marvel Tales #30, Amazing Adventures (vol. 2) #11-17, X-Men Classics #1-3, Giant-Size X-Men #1-2, Classic X-Men #1-21, Marvel Treasury Edition #26-27, Bizarre Adventures #27, Incredible Hulk and Wolverine #1, Phoenix: The Untold Story #1, Amazing Adventures (vol. 3) #1-14	May 1987: July 1988	48	$2.95
4	Uncanny X-Men #1-138, Uncanny X-Men Annuals #1-3, Ka-Zar #2-3, Marvel Tales #30, Amazing Adventures (vol. 2) #11-17, X-Men Classics #1-3, Giant-Size X-Men #1-2, Classic X-Men #1-21, Marvel Treasury Edition #26-27, Bizarre Adventures #27, Incredible Hulk and Wolverine #1, Phoenix: The Untold Story #1, Amazing Adventures (vol. 3) #1-14	May 1987: July 1988	48	$2.95
5	Uncanny X-Men #1-138, Uncanny X-Men Annuals #1-3, Ka-Zar #2-3, Marvel Tales #30, Amazing Adventures (vol. 2) #11-17, X-Men Classics #1-3, Giant-Size X-Men #1-2, Classic X-Men #1-21, Marvel Treasury Edition #26-27, Bizarre Adventures #27, Incredible Hulk and Wolverine #1, Phoenix: The Untold Story #1, Amazing Adventures (vol. 3) #1-14	May 1987: July 1988	48	$2.95
6	Uncanny X-Men #1-138, Uncanny X-Men Annuals #1-3, Ka-Zar #2-3, Marvel Tales #30, Amazing Adventures (vol. 2) #11-17, X-Men Classics #1-3, Giant-Size X-Men #1-2, Classic X-Men #1-21, Marvel Treasury Edition #26-27, Bizarre Adventures #27, Incredible Hulk and Wolverine #1, Phoenix: The Untold Story #1, Amazing Adventures (vol. 3) #1-14	May 1987: July 1988	48	$2.95
7	Uncanny X-Men #1-138, Uncanny X-Men Annuals #1-3, Ka-Zar #2-3, Marvel Tales #30, Amazing Adventures (vol. 2) #11-17, X-Men Classics #1-3, Giant-Size X-Men #1-2, Classic X-Men #1-21, Marvel Treasury Edition #26-27, Bizarre Adventures #27, Incredible Hulk and Wolverine #1, Phoenix: The Untold Story #1, Amazing Adventures (vol. 3) #1-14	May 1987: July 1988	48	$2.95

The Official Marvel Index to Avengers #1-7
#	Synopses	Month of publ.	Pages	Orig. price
1	Avengers #1-145, Avengers Annuals #1-5, Marvel Super Heroes #17, Ka-Zar Quarterly #1, Kree-Skrull War starring the Avengers #1-2, Defenders #8-11, Giant-Size Avengers #1-5	June 1987: August 1988	48	$2.95
2	Avengers #1-145, Avengers Annuals #1-5, Marvel Super Heroes #17, Ka-Zar Quarterly #1, Kree-Skrull War starring the Avengers #1-2, Defenders #8-11, Giant-Size Avengers #1-5	June 1987: August 1988	48	$2.95
3	Avengers #1-145, Avengers Annuals #1-5, Marvel Super Heroes #17, Ka-Zar Quarterly #1, Kree-Skrull War starring the Avengers #1-2, Defenders #8-11, Giant-Size Avengers #1-5	June 1987: August 1988	48	$2.95
4	Avengers #1-145, Avengers Annuals #1-5, Marvel Super Heroes #17, Ka-Zar Quarterly #1, Kree-Skrull War starring the Avengers #1-2, Defenders #8-11, Giant-Size Avengers #1-5	June 1987: August 1988	48	$2.95
5	Avengers #1-145, Avengers Annuals #1-5, Marvel Super Heroes #17, Ka-Zar Quarterly #1, Kree-Skrull War starring the Avengers #1-2, Defenders #8-11, Giant-Size Avengers #1-5	June 1987: August 1988	48	$2.95
6	Avengers #1-145, Avengers Annuals #1-5, Marvel Super Heroes #17, Ka-Zar Quarterly #1, Kree-Skrull War starring the Avengers #1-2, Defenders #8-11, Giant-Size Avengers #1-5	June 1987: August 1988	48	$2.95
7	Avengers #1-145, Avengers Annuals #1-5, Marvel Super Heroes #17, Ka-Zar Quarterly #1, Kree-Skrull War starring the Avengers #1-2, Defenders #8-11, Giant-Size Avengers #1-5	June 1987: August 1988	48	$2.95

=== The Official Marvel Index Vol. II ===
Published by Marvel Comics 1994 - 1995

The Official Marvel Index to X-Men #1-5
#	Synopses	Month of publ.	Pages	Orig. price
1	X-Men #1-51	April 1994	32	$1.95
2	X-Men #52-122, Giant-Size X-Men #1, X-Men Annual #1-2	May 1994	32	$1.95
3	X-Men #123-141, Uncanny X-Men #142-177, Special Edition X-Men #1, Uncanny X-Men Annual #3-7	June 1994	32	$1.95
4	Uncanny X-Men #178-234, Uncanny X-Men Annual #8-12	July 1994	32	$1.95
5	Uncanny X-Men #235-287, Uncanny X-Men Annual #13-15	August 1994	32	$1.95

The Official Marvel Index to Avengers #1-6
#	Synopses		Month of publ.	Pages	Orig. price
1	Avengers #1-60	Avengers Annuals #1-20, Giant-Size Avengers #1-5	October 1994	32	$1.95
2	Avengers #61-122	Avengers Annuals #1-20, Giant-Size Avengers #1-5	November 1994	32	$1.95
3	Avengers #123-176	Avengers Annuals #1-20, Giant-Size Avengers #1-5	December 1994	32	$1.95
4	Avengers #177-230	Avengers Annuals #1-20, Giant-Size Avengers #1-5	January 1995	32	$1.95
5	Avengers #231-285	Avengers Annuals #1-20, Giant-Size Avengers #1-5	February 1995	32	$1.95
6	Avengers #286-333	Avengers Annuals #1-20, Giant-Size Avengers #1-5	March 1995	32	$1.95

=== Official Index to the Marvel Universe ===
Published by Marvel Comics 2009 - 2012

Official Index to the Marvel Universe #1 - 14
#	Synopses	Month of publ.	Pages	Orig. price
1	Spider-Man: Amazing Fantasy #15, Amazing Spider-Man #1-52, Amazing Spider-Man Annual #1-4; Iron Man: Tales of Suspense #39-73; X-Men: The X-Men #1-50	January 2009	64	$3.99
2	Spider-Man: Amazing Spider-Man #53-102, Amazing Spider-Man Annual #5; Iron Man: Tales of Suspense #74-99, Iron Man and Sub-Mariner #1, Iron Man #1-11; X-Men: The X-Men #51-108, X-Men King-Size Special #1-2, Giant-Size X-Men #1-2	February 2009	64	$3.99
3	Spider-Man: Amazing Spider-Man #103-146, Giant-Size Super-Heroes #1, Giant-Size Spider-Man #1-6, Amazing Spider-Man Special #6-9; Iron Man: Iron Man #12-65; X-Men: X-Men #109-150, X-Men Annual #3-4	March 2009	64	$3.99
4	Spider-Man: Amazing Spider-Man #147-197, Amazing Spider-Man Annual #10-11; Iron Man: Iron Man #66-116, Iron Man Special #1-2, Iron Man Annual #3-4, Giant-Size Iron Man #1; X-Men: Uncanny X-Men #151-192, X-Men Annual #5-7, Special Edition X-Men #1	April 2009	64	$3.99
5	Spider-Man: Amazing Spider-Man #198-244, Amazing Spider-Man Annual #12-16; Iron Man: Iron Man #117-169, Iron Man Annual #5; X-Men: Uncanny X-Men #192-229, X-Men Annual #8-11, Heroes for Hope Starring the X-Men #1	May 2009	64	$3.99
6	Spider-Man: Amazing Spider-Man #245-286, Amazing Spider-Man Annual #17-20; Iron Man: Iron Man #170-214, Iron Man Annual #6-8; X-Men: Uncanny X-Men #230-268, X-Men Annual #12-14	June 2009	64	$3.99
7	Spider-Man: Amazing Spider-Man #287-327, Spider-Man versus Wolverine #1, Amazing Spider-Man Annual #21-23; Iron Man: Iron Man #215-259, Iron Man Annual #9-11; X-Men: Uncanny X-Men #269-303, X-Men Annual #15-17	July 2009	64	$3.99
8	Spider-Man: Amazing Spider-Man #328-366, Amazing Spider-Man Annual #24-26, Amazing Spider-Man: Soul Of The Hunter; Iron Man: Iron Man #260-299, Iron Man Annual #12-14; X-Men: Uncanny X-Men #304-337, Uncanny X-Men Annual #18, '95, '96, Astonishing X-Men #1-4	August 2009	64	$3.99
9	Spider-Man: Amazing Spider-Man #367-401, Amazing Spider-Man Annual #27-28, Amazing Spider-Man Super Special #1; Iron Man: Iron Man #300-332, Iron Man Annual #15, Age of Innocence: The Rebirth of Iron Man, Iron Man (1996) #1-7; X-Men: Uncanny X-Men #338-375 and -1, Uncanny X-Men Annual '97, Uncanny X-Men/Fantastic Four Annual 1998	September 2009	64	$3.99
10	Spider-Man: Amazing Spider-Man #402-435 and -1, Spider-Man: Maximum Clonage Alpha #1, Spider-Man: Maximum Clonage Omega #1, Amazing Scarlet Spider #1-2, Amazing Spider-Man Annual '96 and '97; Iron Man: Iron Man #8-13, Iron Man (1998) #1-35 and 1/2, Iron Man/Captain America Annual 1998, Iron Man Annual 1999 and 2000; X-Men: Uncanny X-Men #376-412, Uncanny X-Men Annual '99, 2000, 2001	October 2009	64	$3.99
11	Spider-Man: Amazing Spider-Man #436-441, Amazing Spider-Man Annual '98, '99, 2000, 2001, Amazing Spider-Man (1998) #1-36; Iron Man: Iron Man #36-77, Iron Man Annual 2001; X-Men: Uncanny X-Men #413-456	November 2009	64	$3.99
12	Spider-Man: Amazing Spider-Man (1998) #37-58, Amazing Spider-Man #500-533; Iron Man: Iron Man (1998) #78-89, Iron Man (2005) #1-14, Iron Man/Captain America: Casualties of War #1, Iron Man: Director of S.H.I.E.L.D #15-27, Iron Man: Director of S.H.I.E.L.D Annual #1; X-Men: Uncanny X-Men #457-489, Uncanny X-Men Annual #1 (2006)	December 2009	64	$3.99
13	Spider-Man: Amazing Spider-Man #534-575, Amazing Spider-Man: Swing Shift, Amazing Spider-Man: Fear Itself #1; Iron Man: Iron Man: Director of S.H.I.E.L.D #28-32, Invincible Iron Man (2008) #1-19, War Machine Ashcan Edition, War Machine (1994) #1-17; X-Men: Uncanny X-Men #490-514, Uncanny X-Men Annual #2 (2009), Dark Avengers/Uncanny X-Men: Utopia, Dark Avengers/Uncanny X-Men: Exodus, X-Men: The Hidden Years #1-6	January 2010	64	$3.99
14	Spider-Man: Amazing Spider-Man #576-600, Amazing Spider-Man: The Short Halloween #1, Amazing Spider-Man Annual #1 (2008), #36, Amazing Adventures (1961) #1-6, Amazing Adult Fantasy #7-14, Amazing Fantasy (1995) #16-18; Iron Man: War Machine #18-25, Iron Man: Director of S.H.I.E.L.D #33-35, War Machine Sneak Peek #1, War Machine (2008) #1-12, Iron Man: The Iron Age #1 and 2, Iron Man: Bad Blood #1-4, Iron Man: House of M #1-3, Iron Man: The Inevitable #1-6, Iron Man: Hypervelocity #1-6, Iron Man: Enter the Mandarin #1-6, Iron Man: Legacy of Doom #1-4, Iron Man 2020, Iron Man: Crash; X-Men: X-Men: The Hidden Years #7-22, Giant-Size X-Men #3 and 4	February 2010	64	$3.99

Official Index to the Marvel Universe: The Avengers, Thor and Captain America #1 - 15
#	Synopses	Month of publ.	Pages	Orig. price
1	The Avengers: The Avengers #1-39; Captain America: Captain America Comics (1941) #1-5, Captain America #100-128; Thor: Journey into Mystery #83-109	May 2010	64	$3.99
2	The Avengers: The Avengers #40-79, Avengers Annual #1 and 2 Captain America: Captain America Comics #6-9, Captain America #129-158, Captain America Annual #1 and 2 Thor: Journey into Mystery #110-125, Journey into Mystery Annual #1, The Mighty Thor #126-144, The Mighty Thor Annual #2	June 2010	64	$3.99
3	The Avengers: The Avengers #80-116, Avengers Annual #3-5; Captain America: Captain America Comics #10-13, Captain America #159-186, Giant-Size Captain America #1; Thor: The Mighty Thor #145-191, Tales of Asgard #1, The Mighty Thor Annual #3	July 2010	64	$3.99
4	The Avengers: The Avengers #117-146, Giant-Size Avengers #1-5; Captain America: Captain America Comics #14-17, Captain America #187-216, Captain America Annual #3 and 4, Captain America's Bicentennial Battles; Thor: The Mighty Thor #192-237	August 2010	64	$3.99
5	The Avengers: The Avengers #147-181, Avengers Annual #6-8; Captain America: Captain America Comics #18-21, Captain America #217-247; Thor: The Mighty Thor #238-277, Giant-Size Thor #1, The Mighty Thor Annual #5-7	September 2010	64	$3.99
6	The Avengers: The Avengers #182-218, Avengers Annual #9 and 10; Captain America: Captain America Comics #22-26, Captain America #248-273, Captain America Annual #5; Thor: The Mighty Thor #278-313, The Mighty Thor Annual #8 and 9	October 2010	64	$3.99
7	The Avengers: The Avengers #219-253, Avengers Annual #11-13; Captain America: Captain America Comics #27 and 28, Captain America #274-303, Captain America Annual #6 and 7, Captain America Special Edition #1 and 2 Thor: The Mighty Thor #314-357, The Mighty Thor Annual #10-13, Marvel Graphic Novel #33, Tales of Asgard (1984) #1	November 2010	64	$3.99
8	The Avengers: The Avengers #254-288, Avengers Annual #14-16; Captain America: Captain America Comics #29 and 30, Captain America #304-337, Captain America Annual #8; Thor: The Mighty Thor #358-409, The Mighty Thor Annual #14	December 2010	64	$3.99
9	The Avengers: The Avengers #289-321, Avengers Annual #17 and 18, Avengers Death Trap: The Vault; Captain America: Captain America Comics #31 and 32, Captain America #338-366; Thor: The Mighty Thor #410-448, The Mighty Thor Annual #15-17	January 2011	64	$3.99
10	The Avengers: The Avengers #322-347, Avengers Annual #19 and 20; Captain America: Captain America Comics #33 and 34, Captain America #367-386, Captain America Annual #9; Thor: The Mighty Thor #449-502, The Mighty Thor Annual #18 and 19, Thor: The Legend #1, Journey into Mystery #503-510	February 2011	64	$3.99
11	The Avengers: The Avengers #348-366, Avengers Annual #21; Captain America: Captain America Comics #35-36, Captain America #387-414, Captain America Annual #10-11; Thor: Journey into Mystery #511-521 and -1, The Mighty Thor (1998) #1-49, The Mighty Thor Annual '99, 2000 and 2001	March 2011	64	$3.99
12	The Avengers: The Avengers #367-395, Avengers Annual #22 and 23, Avengers: The Crossing, Avengers: Timeslide; Captain America: Captain America Comics #37-38, Captain America #415-454, Captain America Annual #12-13, Captain America: The Legend #1, Captain America (1996) #1; Thor: The Mighty Thor (1998) #50-85, Thor (2007) #1-12, Thor: Truth of History #1, Thor God-Size Special #1, Thor #600	April 2011	64	$3.99
13	The Avengers: The Avengers #396-402, The Avengers (1996) #1-13, The Avengers (1998) #1-10, Avengers-Squadron Supreme Annual 1998; Captain America: Captain America Comics #39-41, Captain America (1996) #2-13, Captain America (1998) #1-50, Captain America-Citizen V Annual 1998, Captain America Annual 1999-2001, Captain America (2002) #1-27	May 2011	64	$3.99
14	The Avengers: The Avengers (1998) #11-36, Avengers Annual 1999-2000, The Avengers #0 (Wizard magazine supplement); Captain America: Captain America Comics #42-48, Captain America (2002) #28-32, Captain America (2005) #1-50, Captain America 65th Anniversary Special, Fallen Son: The Death of Captain America #1-5, Captain America #600-601, Captain America: Reborn #1-6, Captain America: Who Will Wield the Shield?	June 2011	64	$3.99
15	The Avengers: The Avengers (1998) #37-84, Avengers Annual 2001, The Avengers #500-503, Avengers Finale #1, New Avengers #1-64, New Avengers Annual #1-3, New Avengers Finale	July 2011	64	$3.99

Official Index to the Marvel Universe: Wolverine, Punisher and Ghost Rider #1 - 8
#	Synopses	Month of publ.	Pages	Orig. price
1	Ghost Rider: Marvel Spotlight (1972) #5-11, Ghost Rider #1-40; Punisher: Punisher (1986) #1-5, Punisher (1987) #1-35, Punisher Annual #1-3; Wolverine: Wolverine (1982) #1-4, Kitty Pride and Wolverine #1-6, Spider-Man vs. Wolverine (1987), The Best of Marvel Comics (1987) trade paperback, Wolverine (1988) #1-32, Wolverine/Nick Fury: The Scorpio Connection, Wolverine: The Jungle Adventure	August 2011	64	$3.99
2	Ghost Rider: Ghost Rider #41-81, Ghost Rider (1990) #1-6; Punisher: Punisher (1987) #36-80, Punisher Annual #4-5; Wolverine: Wolverine (1988) #33-70, Wolverine: Bloodlust, Wolverine: Bloody Choices, Wolverine: Rahne of Tears, Wolverine: Inner Fury, Marvel Collector's Edition (1992)	September 2011	64	$3.99
3	Ghost Rider: Ghost Rider (1990) #7-54, Ghost Rider/Wolverine/Punisher: Hearts of Darkness, Ghost Rider/Captain America: Fear, Ghost Rider Annual #1-2; Punisher: Punisher (1987) #81-104, Punisher Annual #6-7, Punisher (1995) #1-16; Wolverine: Wolverine (1988) #71-100, Wolverine: Killing, Wolverine in Global Jeopardy, Wolverine: Evilution, Wolverine & Nick Fury: Scorpio Rising, Weapon X (1995) #1-4, Wolverine '95 Annual, Wolverine: Knight of Terra, Logan: Path of the Warlord	October 2011	64	$3.99
4	Ghost Rider: Ghost Rider (1990) #55-93, Ghost Rider/Wolverine/Punisher: The Dark Design, Ghost Rider: Crossroads #1, Ghost Rider #-1, Ghost Rider Finale (2007) (originally intended to be the 94th issue in 1998, but the story went unpublished until 2007), Ghost Rider (2001) #1-6 and #1/2, Ghost Rider (2005) #1-2; Punisher: Punisher (1995) #17-18, Punisher (1998) #1-4; Wolverine: Wolverine/Punisher: Revelation #1-4, Punisher (2000) #1-12, Punisher (2001) #1-26, Wolverine (1988) #101-133, Wolverine #102.5, Wolverine Annual '96 and '97, Logan: Shadow Society, Wolverine #-1 and 1/2, Wolverine: Doombringer, Wolverine: Black Rio	November 2011	64	$3.99
5	Ghost Rider: Ghost Rider (2005) #3-6, Ghost Rider (2006) #1-35, Ghost Rider Annual #1-2, Ghost Rider: Danny Ketch #1-5, Ghost Riders: Heaven's on Fire #1-3; Punisher: Punisher (2001) #27-37, Born #1-4, Punisher (2004) #1-30, Punisher: The Cell, Punisher: The Tyger #1; Wolverine: Wolverine (1988) #134-169, Wolverine/Cable, Wolverine Annual '99 and '00, Wolverine: Son of Canada	December 2011	64	$3.99
6	Ghost Rider: Ghost Riders: Heaven's on Fire #4-6, Shadowland: Ghost Rider #1, Ghost Rider (2011) #0.1, 1–4, Champions #1-17, X-Force/Champions 1998, Gambit and the Champions: From the Marvel Vault #1, Ghost Rider/Blaze: Spirits of Vengeance 1-23, Blaze: Legacy of Blood 1-4 (the Ghost Rider portion of this index series concludes in issue #6); Punisher: Punisher (2004) #31-65, Punisher MAX Annual #1, Punisher: Force of Nature #1, Punisher MAX Special: Little Black Book #1, Punisher MAX X-Mas Special #1, Punisher MAX: Frank Castle #66-70, Punisher MAX: Naked Kill #1; Wolverine: Wolverine Annual 2001, Wolverine (1988) #170-189, Wolverine (2003) #1-20	January 2012	64	$3.99
7	Punisher: Punisher MAX: Frank Castle #71-75, Wolverine/Punisher #1-5, Punisher: Red X-Mas #1, Daredevil vs Punisher #1-6, Punisher: Silent Night #1, Punisher vs Bullseye #1-5, Punisher: Bloody Valentine #1, Punisher: X-Mas Special #1, Punisher War Zone (2007) #1-26, Punisher War Zone Annual #1, Punisher: War Zone #1-6, Punisher (2009) #1-12, Punisher Annual #1, Dark Reign: The List-Punisher #1; Wolverine: Wolverine (2003) #21-65, Wolverine: Saudade, Giant-Size Wolverine, Wolverine Annual #1-2, Wolverine: Firebreak, Wolverine: The Amazing Immortal Man and Other Bloody Tales, Wolverine: Dangerous Games, Wolverine: Killing Made Simple, Wolverine: Chop Shop	February 2012	64	$3.99
8	Punisher: Punisher (2009) #13-16, Franken-Castle #17-21, Punisher: In the Blood #1-5, Punisher (2011) #1-9, Punisher Summer Special #1-4, Punisher Back to School Special #1-3, Punisher Holiday Special #1-3, Punisher: POV #1-4, Punisher/Captain America: Blood & Glory #1-3, Punisher: Ghosts of Innocents #1-2, Punisher: Origin of Microchip #1-2, Wolverine And The Punisher: Damaging Evidence #1-3, Punisher: Year One #1-4, Spider-Man/Punisher: Family Plot #1-2, Marvel Graphic Novel: The Punisher - Assassin's Guild, Epic Graphic Novel: The Punisher - Return to Big Nothing, Punisher: Intruder #1, Classic Punisher #1, The Punisher: Kingdom Come, The Punisher: No Escape, Punisher: The Prize, Punisher: Bloodlines, The Punisher: Blood on the Moors; Wolverine: Wolverine: Flies to a Spider, Wolverine: Switchback, Wolverine (2003) #66-74, Rampaging Wolverine, Wolverine: The Anniversary, Free Comic Book Day: Wolverine-Origin of an X-Men, Wolverine: Revolver, Wolverine: Weapon X #1-16, Wolverine: Old Man Logan Giant Size, Dark Reign: The List-Wolverine, Wolverine: Under the Boardwalk, Wolverine: Wendigo!, Wolverine: Savage, Wolverine: Mr. X, Wolverine #900, Wolverine: Road To Hell, Wolverine (2010) #1-5	March 2012	64	$3.99

Official Index to the Marvel Universe (trade paperback) #1 - 9
#	Title	Info	ISBN	publ. Date	Pages	Orig. price
1	Iron Man	Reprints Iron Man pages from Official Marvel Index #1-14; Additional entries: Iron Man: Iron Protocols #1, Iron Man and Power Pack #1-4, Iron Man: Viva Las Vegas #1-2 and Iron Man: The End	ISBN 0-7851-4589-3	April 2, 2010	320	$19.99
2	The Amazing Spider-Man	Reprints Spider-Man pages from Official Marvel Index #1-14; Additional entries: The Spectacular Spider-Man Magazine #1-2, Amazing Spider-Man Mini Comic (Eye Magazine promo)	ISBN 0-7851-4588-5	July 14, 2010	332	$19.99
3	The Uncanny X-Men	Reprints X-Men pages from Official Marvel Index #1-14; Additional entries: Classic X-Men/X-Men Classic #1-110	ISBN 0-7851-4958-9	November 17, 2010	332	$19.99
4	Thor	Reprints Thor pages from Official Marvel Index to the Avengers, Thor and Captain America #1-12; Additional entries: Journey into Mystery #1 (1952), Balder the Brave #1-4, Thor Annual #1 (2009), Thor #601-614, Thor Giant-Size Finale #1, Sif #1, Siege: Loki #1, Free Comic Book Day 2010 (Iron Man-Thor), Thor: Godstorm #1-3, Thor: Vikings #1-5, Thor: Son of Asgard (2004) #1-12, Thor: Blood Oath #1-6, Secret Invasion: Thor #1-3, Thor: Tales of Asgard by Stan Lee and Jack Kirby (2009) #1-6, Thunderstrike #1-24, Marvel Double Feature (1994) #13-16, Thor Corps #1-4, Thor: Ages of Thunder #1, Thor: Reign of Blood #1, Thor: Man of War #1, Thor: The Trial of Thor #1, Thor: The Rage of Thor, Marvel Comics Thor #1 (2000), Taco Bell Collector Edition Thor #1 (2009)	ISBN 0-7851-5098-6	May 3, 2011	332	$19.99
5	Captain America	Reprints Captain America pages from Official Marvel Index to the Avengers, Thor and Captain America #1-14; Additional entries: Captain America Comics #49-73, 76–78, Captain America's Weird Tales #74-75, Captain America #602-605, Siege: Captain America	ISBN 0-7851-5097-8	May 24, 2011	420	$24.99
6	The Avengers	Reprints Avengers pages from Official Marvel Index to the Avengers, Thor and Captain America #1-15; Additional entries: Avengers #1 1/2, Avengers: The Korvac Saga TPB (the epilogue was new content), Avengers Collector's Edition #1 (1993), Avengers: The Terminatrix Objective #1-4, Avengers Strikefile #1, Marvel Double Feature: Avengers/Giant-Man #379-382, Avengers Forever #1-12, Domination Factor: Avengers #1.2, 2.4, 3.6, 4.8 (does not use normal numbering sequence), Avengers: The Ultron Imperative, Avengers: Celestial Quest #1-8, New Avengers: Illuminati #1 (2006), Giant-Size Avengers #1 (2008), Free Comic Book Day: Avengers 2009, Dark Reign: The List-Avengers, The Last Avengers Story #1-2, Timeslip Special, Avengers Log #1	ISBN 0-7851-5522-8	September 28, 2011	356	$19.99
7	Ghost Rider	Reprints Ghost Rider pages from Official Marvel Index to Wolverine, Punisher and Ghost Rider #1-6; Additional entries: Blaze #1-12, Ghost Rider: Trail of Tears 1–6, The Ghost Rider (1967) #1-7, Night Rider #1-6, The Original Ghost Rider Rides Again #1-7, The Original Ghost Rider (1992) #1-20	ISBN 0-7851-6200-3	December 28, 2011	164	$19.99
8	The Punisher	Reprints Punisher pages from Official Marvel Index to Wolverine, Punisher and Ghost Rider #1-8; Additional entries: The Punisher: G Force, The Punisher: Die Hard in the Big Easy, Punisher-Black Widow: Spinning Doomsday's Web, Spider-Man-Punisher-Sabretooth: Designer Genes, Punisher Invades The 'Nam: Final Invasion, Punisher: A Man Named Frank, Punisher: Final Quarter, Punisher War Journal (1988) #1-80, Punisher: War Zone (1992) #1-41, Punisher: War Zone Annual #1-2, Spider-Man vs. Punisher (2000), Punisher MAX #1-22, Punisher MAX: Get Castle #1, Punisher MAX: Butterfly #1, Punisher MAX: Happy Ending #1, Punisher MAX: Hot Rods of Death #1, Punisher MAX: Tiny Ugly World #1, Punisher Kills the Marvel Universe, Punisher: The End	ISBN 0-7851-6202-X	June 4, 2012	232	$24.99
9	Wolverine	Reprints Wolverine pages from Official Marvel Index to Wolverine, Punisher and Ghost Rider #1-8; Additional entries: Wolverine (2010) #5.1, 6-20, Wolverine: Debt of Death, Wolverine #1000, 300–304, Wolverine Art Appreciation; Additional pages: Details on Wolverine's character history prior to Giant-Size X-Men #1 in chronological order	ISBN 0-7851-6201-1	May 20, 2013	228	$19.99

== See also ==
- Official DC Index
- Official Handbook of the Marvel Universe
- Official Handbook of the Conan Universe
