= Crisis on Infinite Earths =

Limited DC comic crossover series

- Cover of Crisis on Infinite Earths #1 (April 1985). Art by George Pérez.

Publication information
- Publisher: DC Comics
- Schedule: Monthly
- Format: Limited series
- Publication date: April 1985 – March 1986
- No. of issues: 12
- Main characters: Monitor; Harbinger; Pariah; Superman (Kal-El); Superboy-Prime; Alexander Luthor Jr.; Flash (Barry Allen); Psycho-Pirate; Anti-Monitor; Supergirl

Creative team
- Created by: Marv Wolfman; George Pérez
- Written by: Marv Wolfman
- Penciller: George Pérez
- Inkers: Dick Giordano; Jerry Ordway; Mike DeCarlo
- Letterer: John Costanza
- Colorists: Anthony Tollin; Tom Ziuko; Carl Gafford
- Editor: Marv Wolfman

Crisis on Infinite Earths is a 1985 to 1986 American comic book crossover series published by DC Comics. Written by Marv Wolfman and pencilled by George Pérez, it was first released as a 12-issue limited series from April 1985 to March 1986. As the main piece of a crossover event, some plot elements were featured in tie-in issues of other publications. Since its initial publication, the series has been reprinted in various formats and editions.

The idea for the series stemmed from Wolfman's desire to abandon the DC Multiverse depicted in the company's comics—which he thought was unfriendly to readers—and create a single, unified DC Universe (DCU). The foundation of Crisis on Infinite Earths developed through a character called the Monitor, introduced in Wolfman's The New Teen Titans in July 1982 before the series itself started.

At the start of Crisis on Infinite Earths, the Anti-Monitor (the Monitor's evil counterpart) is unleashed on the DC Multiverse and begins to destroy the various Earths that it comprises. The Monitor tries to recruit heroes from around the Multiverse but is murdered, while Brainiac collaborates with the villains to conquer the remaining Earths. Eventually, both the heroes and villains are united by the Spectre; the series concludes with the establishment of a single Earth in place of the Multiverse after Kal-L, Superboy-Prime and Alexander Luthor Jr. have defeated the Anti-Monitor. Crisis on Infinite Earths is noted for its high death count; hundreds of characters died, including DC icons Kara Zor-El (the original Supergirl) and Barry Allen (the Flash of the Silver Age). The story's events resulted in the entire DCU being rebooted, dividing the fictional universe's timeline into "pre-Crisis" and "post-Crisis" eras.

The series was a bestseller for DC. The story is credited with popularizing the idea of a large-scale crossover in comics. It was followed by Zero Hour: Crisis in Time! (1994), Infinite Crisis (2005–2006) and Final Crisis (2008–2009). Dark Crisis on Infinite Earths (2022) also served as a sequel to Crisis on Infinite Earths.

== Publication history ==
=== Background ===
DC Comics is an American comic book publisher best known for its superhero stories featuring characters including Batman, Superman, and Wonder Woman. The company debuted in February 1935 with New Fun: The Big Comic Magazine. Most of DC's comic books (as well as some published under its imprints Vertigo and Young Animal) take place within a shared universe called the DC Universe (DCU) allowing plot elements, characters, and settings to cross over with each other. The concept of the DCU has provided DC's writers some challenges in maintaining continuity, due to conflicting events within different comics that need to reflect the shared nature of the universe. "Flash of Two Worlds" from The Flash #123 (September 1961), which featured Barry Allen (the Silver Age Flash) teaming up with Jay Garrick (the Golden Age Flash) was the first DC comic to suggest that the DCU was a part of a multiverse.

The DC Multiverse concept was expanded in later years with the DCU having infinite Earths; for example, the Golden Age versions of DC heroes resided on Earth-Two, while DC's Silver Age heroes were from Earth-One. Since "Crisis on Earth-One!" (1963), DC has used the word "Crisis" to describe important crossovers within the DC Multiverse. Over the years, various writers took liberties creating additional parallel Earths as plot devices and to house characters DC had acquired from other companies, making the DC Multiverse a "convoluted mess". DC's comic book sales were also far below those of their competitor Marvel Comics. According to ComicsAlliance journalist Chris Sims, "the [DC] multiverse . . . felt old-fashioned. . . . Marvel, on the other hand, felt contemporary and when you stack them up against each other, there's one difference that sticks out above anything else: Marvel feels unified."

Writer Marv Wolfman became popular among DC's readers for his work on The New Teen Titans. George Pérez, who illustrated The New Teen Titans, also began to rise to prominence in this era. In 1984, Pérez entered into an exclusive contract with DC, which was later extended one year. Although The New Teen Titans was a major success for DC, the company's comic book sales were still below Marvel's. Wolfman began to attribute this to the DC Multiverse, feeling "The Flash of Two Worlds" had created a "nightmare": it was not reader-friendly for new readers to be able to keep track of and writers struggled with the continuity errors it caused. In The New Teen Titans #21 (July 1982), Wolfman introduced the shadowy, potentially villainous Monitor; this laid the foundation for Crisis on Infinite Earths.

=== Development ===
In 1981, Wolfman was editing Green Lantern. He got a letter from a fan asking why a character did not recognize Green Lantern in a recent issue despite the two having had worked together in an issue three years earlier. Soon afterward, Wolfman pitched Crisis on Infinite Earths as The History of the DC Universe, seeing it as a way to simplify the DCU and attract new readers. The History of the DC Universe's title was changed to Crisis on Infinite Earths because its premise, involving the destruction of entire worlds, sounded more like a crisis.

Wolfman said when he pitched the series to DC, he realized it was going to be a completely new beginning for the DCU. "I knew up front, and they did too, how big this was going to be," he said. "But, no-one knew how well it would sell, or whether it would sell at all. It was a risk DC was willing to take, because my thoughts were that DC needed a lot of help at that time, and they did too." Wolfman also said he saw it as an attempt to improve DC's reputation for storytelling which many readers at the time saw as old-fashioned.

The crossover was fleshed out and coordinated at a meeting attended by president Jenette Kahn, Paul Levitz, vice president and executive editor Dick Giordano and DC's editors. In 1982, DC hired a researcher, Peter Sanderson, to go through their library and read every comic the company had published, a task that took two years. The series was delayed to 1983 due to the time for research, and again to 1985 when it was still not ready for 1983 and to coincide with DC's fiftieth anniversary. As an event like Crisis on Infinite Earths had never happened before, those working on it met for around two hours a week, which was uncommon at the time.

The groundwork for the series was laid the year before it was published. One of the greatest challenges for Wolfman and Giordano was coming up with a story. Wolfman cited making use of every DC character and creating a plot that was fun to read and as filled with surprises as difficulties, as the series needed to sell well; if it did not, it could have caused a disaster for DC. Plotting became easier once a beginning and an ending had been determined and when Pérez became involved. Crisis on Infinite Earths was DC's first mainstream maxiseries, which was still a relatively new concept.

Early in planning for Crisis on Infinite Earths, a list was made of characters that were part of the DCU; characters from other universes, such as those that formerly belonged to Charlton Comics, also were used. According to Wolfman, one of the purposes of Crisis on Infinite Earths was to showcase all the characters DC had. The series is infamous for its high death count. Hundreds of characters died; among the most noted was Barry Allen's. Wolfman has said he did not want to kill Allen, but DC ordered him to because it perceived the character as dull. Therefore, he conceived Allen's death—in which he runs through time before vanishing—as a way to make the character seem more interesting and hopefully spare him. Wolfman wanted to make the series unforgettable; he said that many writers had expressed interest in simplifying DC's continuity and he wanted to be the one to do so.

Pérez says he was not the intended artist for Crisis on Infinite Earths, but was excited when he learned about it, seeing it as an opportunity for "revenge" against Marvel, which he blamed for blocking the JLA/Avengers crossover he had been working on. (Note: The crossover was not released until 2003.) He enjoyed working with Wolfman again, and took a leave of absence from The New Teen Titans to draw the series. DC initially did not know Pérez would want to work on it. According to Pérez, he was motivated by the fact that DC did not know if the series was going to be a success. He also wanted "to draw everybody I could get my hands on" and called illustrating the series some of the most fun he ever had. Pérez was excited because not only did he get to draw the Teen Titans again, but also obscure characters he was not familiar with, saying he could possibly have never gotten another chance. Wolfman has said one panel in Crisis on Infinite Earths shows the Marvel Universe being destroyed. When Giordano (the series' initial inker) had difficulty meeting deadlines while continuing as DC vice president and executive editor, editorial coordinator Pat Bastienne reassigned the inking to Jerry Ordway despite Giordano's objections.

=== Publication ===
The idea for Crisis on Infinite Earths was first noted in the December 1981 issue of The Comics Journal, which mentioned a twelve-part maxiseries scheduled for 1982. The series was announced in Giordano's "Meanwhile..." column DC ran in its titles cover dated June 1984. Giordano warned readers that "odd occurrences" would begin to happen throughout DC's comics. He also clarified it would commemorate DC's fiftieth anniversary and would provide the company "wonderful stepping-stones" for new characters and comics. The series was marketed with the tagline "Worlds will live, worlds will die and nothing will ever be the same".

The series began in January 1985 and lasted for twelve issues, ending in December 1985 (issues cover dated April 1985 through March 1986). The close spacing of Crisis on Infinite Earths and Marvel's similar crossover Secret Wars caused some fans to create conspiracy theories about idea theft. According to writer Steve Gerber, the series "got virtually no promotion ... How many handouts did you see? How many posters did you see in people's windows? How much information was really distributed to the press and how much was gotten just by individual reporters going to Marv Wolfman and [Crisis artist] George Pérez?"

=== Tie-ins ===
Superman #415 was a tie-in issue to Crisis on Infinite Earths, indicated by the banner at the top of the cover. The cover art is by Eduardo Barreto.

Elements to set up Crisis on Infinite Earths were put in DC's comics years before the crossover took place; an example of this was the Monitor's appearance in The New Teen Titans. In a January 3, 1983 memo, Giordano, Wolfman, and Len Wein instructed editors and writers to use the Monitor twice in the coming year but not to show him: "Because this series involves the entire DC Universe we do ask that each Editor and writer cooperate with the project by using a character called The Monitor in their books twice during the next year". This served to set up the series. When Wolfman and Giordano reiterated this in a 1984 meeting, some editors were not pleased; one was so miffed he did not speak for the rest of the meeting.

Tie-ins for Crisis on Infinite Earths were published in DC's ongoing series; the vast majority of DC's comics featured events that directly tied to the crossover. The following comic book issues were labeled as part of the crossover; their covers contained a banner that read "Special Crisis Cross-Over", along with the logo for DC's fiftieth anniversary.

- All-Star Squadron #50–56
- Amethyst (vol. 2) #13
- Blue Devil #17–18
- DC Comics Presents #86–88
- The Fury of Firestorm #41–42
- Green Lantern (vol. 2) #194–195; #198
- Infinity, Inc. #18–24; Annual #1
- Justice League of America #244–245; Annual #3
- JLA: Incarnations #5 (released in 2001)
- Legion of Super-Heroes #18
- The Losers Special #1
- The New Teen Titans (vol. 2) #13–14
- The Omega Men #31
- Superman #414–415
- Swamp Thing #46
- Wonder Woman #327–329
- Legends of the DC Universe: Crisis on Infinite Earths #1 (released in 1998)

== Collected editions ==
Title	Material collected	Published date	ISBN
Crisis on Infinite Earths	Crisis on Infinite Earths #1–12	December 1998	1-56389-434-3
Crisis on Infinite Earths: The Absolute Edition	Crisis on Infinite Earths #1–12, Official Crisis on Infinite Earths Index #1, Official Crisis on Infinite Earths Cross-Over Index #1	November 2005	1-4012-0712-X
Crisis on Infinite Earths: 35th Anniversary Deluxe Edition	Crisis on Infinite Earths #1–12, History of the DC Universe #1-2	October 2019	978-1401295363
Crisis on Infinite Earths Companion Deluxe Edition Vol. 1	All-Star Squadron #50-60, DC Comics Presents #78, The Fury of Firestorm #41-42, Green Lantern #194-198	November 2018	978-1401274597
Crisis on Infinite Earths Companion Deluxe Edition Vol. 2	DC Comics Presents #86, Swamp Thing #44, Losers Special #1, Legends of the DC Universe: Crisis on Infinite Earths #1, Infinity, Inc. #18-25, Infinity, Inc. Annual #1, Justice League of America #244-245, New Teen Titans (vol. 2) #13-14 and material from Detective Comics #558	May 2019	978-1401289218
Crisis on Infinite Earths Companion Deluxe Edition Vol. 3	Amethyst #13, Blue Devil #17-18, Wonder Woman #327-329, Swamp Thing #46, Legion of Super-Heroes #16, 18, Superman #413-415, DC Comics Presents #87-88, 94–95, Justice League of America Annual #3, The Omega Men #31, and material from The Omega Men #33	October 2019	978-1401294489
DC Finest: Events – Crisis on Infinite Earths: Part One	Swamp Thing #39, Batman #389-391, Detective Comics #555-558, Justice League of America #244, Green Lantern #194, Wonder Woman #327, DC Comics Presents #78, Infinity, Inc. #18-19, The Fury of Firestorm #41, All-Star Squadron #50-52, Crisis on Infinite Earths #1-4, and The Losers Special #1	October 2025	978-1799503040
Crisis on Infinite Earths Box Set	Crisis on Multiple Earths vol 1 (Justice League of America #21, 22, 29, 30, 37, 38, 46, 47) Crisis on Multiple Earths vol 2 (Justice League of America #55, 56, 64, 65, 73, 74, 82, 83) Crisis on Multiple Earths vol 3 (Justice League of America #91, 92, 100, 101, 102, 107, 108, 113) Crisis on Multiple Earths vol 4 (Justice League of America #123, 124, 135, 136, 137, 147, 148, 159, 160) Crisis on Multiple Earths vol 5 (Justice League of America #171, 172, 183, 184, 185, 195, 196, 197) Crisis on Multiple Earths vol 6 (Justice League of America #207, 208, 209, 219, 220, 231, 232, All-Star Squadron #14, 15) Crisis on Infinite Earths (Crisis on Infinite Earths #1-12) Crisis on Infinite Earths: All Star Squadron (All-Star Squadron #50-60) Crisis on Infinite Earths: Green Lantern (Green Lantern #194-198, Legion of Super-Heroes #16, 18, Omega Men #31, 33) Crisis on Infinite Earths: Justice League (Fury of Firestorm #41, 42, Detective Comics #558, Wonder Woman #327, 328, 329, New Teen Titans #13, 14) Crisis on Infinite Earths: Legends (The Losers Special #1, Swamp Thing #44, 46, Legends of the DC Universe: Crisis on Infinite Earths #1, Blue Devil #17, 18, Amethyst #13) Crisis on Infinite Earths: Infinity Inc (Infinity Inc #18-25, Annual #1, Justice League of America #244, 245) Crisis on Infinite Earths: Superman (DC Comics Presents #78, 86, 87, 88, 94, 95, Superman #413, 414, 415, Justice League of America Annual #3) Crisis on Infinite Earths: Behind the Crisis (The History of the DC Universe #1,2, various Monitor appearances, more)	November 2019	978-1401295172

== Synopsis ==
The conflicting stories of the DCU are explained as a Multiverse, containing many parallel universes and alternate versions of the characters, with the primary DC continuity referred to as Earth-One. They were created after renegade scientist Krona built a machine and used it to look back into the beginning of time. A cosmic being from the beginning known as the Monitor catalogues these realities, but he has an evil counterpart, the Anti-Monitor, who comes from an antimatter universe. After Pariah causes an accident with antimatter in his universe, the Anti-Monitor is released and begins destroying many of the realities with a wave of antimatter, planning on becoming sole ruler of all realities. On Earth-Three, Alexander Luthor and Lois Lane teleport their son Alexander Luthor Jr. to another reality as Earth-Three is consumed by the antimatter wave. To combat this, the Monitor recruits heroes and villains from across time and space to set up five towers, to help merge the multiverse back into one to make it stronger.

The Monitor dispatches a team of heroes across time and space to defend mysterious machines that could be the key to saving the remaining universes. Meanwhile, it is revealed that the Flash was transported to the future, and Pariah, constantly witnessing the destruction of worlds, arrives on the doomed Earth-1.

Barry Allen of Earth-One encounters the antimatter wave before being captured by the Anti-Monitor. On Earth 1, various heroes attempt to save people from the approaching antimatter wave. During WWII, the Monitor's towers appear during a battle in which Sgt. Rock, Haunted Tank, and the Losers are fighting together against Nazis.

The Monitor gives powers to Kimiyo Hoshi, turning her into Doctor Light. He is murdered by Harbinger, who is possessed by one of the Anti-Monitor's shadow demons. However, the Monitor knew this would happen and his death releases enough energy to project two of the last five parallel Earths into a protective limbo that nullifies the wave. The Anti-Monitor recruits Psycho-Pirate to his cause, infusing him with part of his power to manipulate the heroes of Earth-4, Earth-S and Earth-X against the rest; this fails when all five Earths enter the limbo universe.

Harbinger then recruits heroes from the remaining Earths to lead an assault on the Anti-Monitor in the antimatter universe, using the powers of Alexander Luthor Jr., the last survivor of Earth-Three, to open a portal between the limbo and antimatter universes. Pariah tracks down the Anti-Monitor at his fortress, and the heroes destroy a converter, powered by stellar energy, used to destroy the last five Earths; the injured Anti-Monitor retreats and Supergirl dies from his attacks after a distraction from Hoshi. The Anti-Monitor creates a new body for himself and tries to use an antimatter cannon to penetrate the limbo universe and destroy the five partially merged Earths. The Flash dies stopping this attempt by using his speed to channel energy.

During a lull in the war, the villains unite under Brainiac. He kills Earth-Two's Alexei Luthor while recruiting the Earth-One Lex Luthor to conquer the remaining Earths. A furious Anti-Monitor absorbs the energy of millions of worlds and vows to travel back through time to prevent the creation of the multiverse. The Spectre unites the heroes and villains by warning them about the Anti-Monitor's plan; the heroes travel back in time to stop the Anti-Monitor, while the villains travel back in time to the planet Oa to prevent Krona from creating the technology necessary for the Anti-Monitor's plan to succeed.

The villains fail, and Krona continues his experiment. The Anti-Monitor waits for Alexander Luthor Jr. to reopen the portal between the positive and antimatter universes, capturing the heroes, but a magically empowered Spectre creates an energy overload which shatters space and time. The five Earths merge into a single shared universe, and the superheroes return to the present; only those present at the dawn of time remember the original realities.

A cosmically empowered Anti-Monitor attacks again, transporting the new Earth to the antimatter universe and summoning a horde of shadow demons who kill Dove, Lori Lemaris, Green Arrow of Earth-Two, Prince Ra-Man, Clayface, Bug-Eyed Bandit, Kole, Huntress, Robin, Sunburst, and Ten-Eyed Man. He falls in a carefully-planned counterattack, culminating in a battle with Superboy of Earth-Prime, Kal-L, and Alexander Luthor Jr., with help from Darkseid. In this final battle, the Anti-Monitor, reduced to a flaming head, crashes into a star and is killed by Kal-L. Before the star explodes, Alex sends Kal-L, Earth-Two Lois Lane, Earth-Prime Superboy and himself to a pocket "paradise" dimension while Wonder Woman of Earth-Two is taken to Mount Olympus by Zeus. This leaves the heroes of the remaining Earth, none of whom remember the original past, to sort out the aftermath of this crisis. Only Psycho-Pirate, who is locked up in Arkham Asylum, remembers the multiverse.

== Alternate versions ==
=== Tales from the Dark Multiverse ===
After the Anti-Monitor's defeat, it was the Justice League who were forever trapped fighting in Ragnarok. The Justice Society/All-Star Squadron came in to rescue the team but were outmatched by Surtur. Alan Scott then sacrificed himself by becoming the pawn of Surtur known as the Dread Lantern, leading Surtur to other worlds in exchange for his promise that he will always spare Earth.

== Reception ==
Despite relatively limited marketing and DC being unsure if the series would be successful, Crisis on Infinite Earths was a bestseller.

IGN's Hilary Goldstein summarized the series as "a crucial turning point for DC Comics" and credited it with saving the company. Goldstein called Wolfman's idea to simplify the DCU bold and unprecedented, noting the story's exceptional size and saying the story was "unbelievable", if somewhat aged. He also praised Pérez's detailed artwork, saying no other artist could have possibly illustrated it as well as he did and gave the book a "must have" rating. Fellow IGN writer Jesse Schedeen named Crisis on Infinite Earths one of the best DC crossovers, agreeing it was unprecedented and dramatic.

Marc Buxton of Comic Book Resources named "Crisis on Infinite Earths" the greatest comic book crossover ever, saying that no crossover has been bigger or as ambitious: "where some events seem hesitant to actually leave a mark on their respective universes, Crisis did it with aplomb". He praised the series for exploring the entire DCU and felt it was a fitting event for DC's fiftieth anniversary. Nerdist News noted that many of the series' central events—such as the deaths of Supergirl and Barry Allen—have become iconic moments in DC's history.

Not all reviewers have been as positive. Chris Sims wrote the series was messy and built awkwardly, describing it as "a textbook definition of style over substance". Sims said it was far from the best work of Wolfman and Pérez; however, he still thought it was groundbreaking, saying, "It's the first time in comics history that EVERYTHING was in danger".

== Merchandise ==
A novelization of Crisis on Infinite Earths was written by Wolfman and published by iBooks in 2005, with cover art by Pérez and Alex Ross. The book follows the events of the original series; most of the story is presented from Barry Allen's point of view, while parts where he is not present are told from a third-person perspective. It also added some details, including internal monologue and updates to make the story more modern, such as characters having cell phones. In 2008, WizKids issued a toy pack centered around the Anti-Monitor as a part of its DC HeroClix toy line. The pack came with a large Anti-Monitor figure with LED-lit eyes, several smaller figures, and a map. An exclusive variant, based on the Sinestro Corps, was available at San Diego Comic-Con and Gen Con Indy conventions that year.

DC Collectibles (then called DC Direct) released three series of action figures between 2005 and 2006. Based on the George Pérez artwork, the figures had a base with the logo of the series and certain figures included an accessory. The first series included Earth 2 Robin, Harbinger, Monitor, Psycho-Pirate, and Supergirl. Later series included the Anti-Monitor, Earth 2 Superman, Flash, Battle Armor Lex Luthor, Brainiac, Earth 1 Batman, Doctor Light, Earth Prime Superboy, Earth 2 Huntress, and one of the Weaponers of Qward.

== Legacy ==
Though it was not the first large-scale comic book crossover, (Note: Marvel's Secret Wars (1984) preceded Crisis on Infinite Earths by one year.) Crisis on Infinite Earths is generally credited with popularizing the idea. Comics historian Matthew K. Manning wrote that Crisis on Infinite Earths paved way for all future crossovers of similar scale, and Andrew J. Friedenthal said "Crisis showed the two major superhero comic book publishers (DC Comics and Marvel Comics) how they could utilize the continuity established by decades' worth of stories to weave together a cohesive, metatextual tapestry that both appealed to long-time readers and brought in massive amounts of money". The series' success inspired DC to begin a tradition of "summer crossovers"; some of these include Invasion! (1988–1989), Armageddon 2001 (1991), Zero Hour: Crisis in Time! (1994), and Identity Crisis (2004), and some mention the events of Crisis on Infinite Earths. The second part of one of DC's later crossovers, Convergence (2015), heavily references the series and sees DC's superheroes travel back to its era. The writers of Convergence all had fun writing stories set during Crisis on Infinite Earths, calling the series an exciting time for DC.

The series had an immediate effect on DC, dividing the company's history into two eras: "Pre-Crisis" and "Post-Crisis". Wolfman and Pérez teamed again to produce the History of the DC Universe limited series to summarize the DCU's new history. In the post-Crisis history, during the "Crisis" many heroes fought the Anti-Monitor's army. He attempted to collapse the positive universe's past and future into a single point in time to destroy it, leaving only the antimatter universe.

Many of DC's characters had their histories rebooted. Wonder Woman's comic was relaunched entirely by Pérez, Wein, and Greg Potter. Superman was first re-envisioned in the limited series The Man of Steel by John Byrne; his comic was retitled The Adventures of Superman to make way for a new Superman series. Batman was minimally affected by the reboot, and his comic was not relaunched. However, he was still given an updated origin, courtesy of Frank Miller. In addition, Wally West replaced Barry Allen as the Flash, the Justice League's roster was changed, and characters DC acquired from other companies, such as Fawcett Publications and Charlton Comics, were integrated into the DCU. The practice of re-envisioning characters in the new DCU lasted well into 1989, with properties such as Green Lantern, Hawkman, Black Orchid, and the Suicide Squad all being rebooted. The revamp raised sales 22% in the first year, and DC beat Marvel in direct market sales for the first time in August and September 1987. The Man of Steel #1 was the bestselling comic book issue of 1986.

Crisis on Infinite Earths has been referenced several times in the various television series that comprise the Arrowverse, starting with the first episode of The Flash which aired in October 2014. It features a newspaper from 2024 that reads "Flash Missing, Vanishes in Crisis". Grant Gustin, who plays the Flash on the show, has said he thinks the goal of the series is to reach "Crisis on Infinite Earths": "Obviously we'd have to go, I think 10 years to reach that, so there's a possibility for sure. It'll be fun to get there." The concept of a multiverse has been explored several times throughout the history of the franchise. Talking in 2014, Geoff Johns, when discussing the difference between the DC Extended Universe and the Marvel Cinematic Universe, said "We look at it as the multiverse. We have our TV universe and our film universe, but they all co-exist. For us, creatively, it's about allowing everyone to make the best possible product, to tell the best story, to do the best world. Everyone has a vision and you really want to let the visions shine through ... It's just a different approach." The storyline inspired the 2019 Arrowverse crossover, also titled "Crisis on Infinite Earths", with the original date seen in the pilot episode of The Flash having been moved up by five years as a side effect of time travel.

== Sequels ==
Zero Hour: Crisis in Time! is a follow-up to Crisis on Infinite Earths, and Identity Crisis also adheres to the continuity changes of Crisis on Infinite Earths and Zero Hour: Crisis in Time!.

Crisis on Infinite Earths is the first installment in what became known as the Crisis trilogy. The second part of the trilogy, the seven-part Infinite Crisis, was written by Geoff Johns and illustrated by Phil Jimenez, Pérez, Ivan Reis, and Jerry Ordway. It was published from October 2005 to June 2006, with a number of tie-in issues. In the series, Kal-L, Alexander Luthor, and Superboy-Prime escape from the pocket dimension they were left in at the end of the original series; Luthor, having gone insane, attempts to recreate the multiverse using the Anti-Monitor's remains as a generator. Meanwhile, Superboy-Prime, having become disillusioned with the surviving Earth, engages in a destructive rampage after confronting the modern Superboy, Conner Kent. The battle culminates in the two Superboys colliding with Luthor's multiverse generator, restoring the Earth (with slight alterations to continuity) and recreating the lost multiverse.

The conclusion to the trilogy, Final Crisis, began in May 2008 and ended in January 2009. The series was written by Grant Morrison, with art by J. G. Jones, Carlos Pacheco, Marco Rudy, and Doug Mahnke. In Final Crisis, Darkseid arrives on Earth and begins a conquest to overthrow reality, as part of a plan by Libra to conquer the Multiverse. The Justice League and Green Lantern Corps join forces in a desperate attempt to stop the upcoming onslaught.

In 2022, a new DC Comics Crisis event occurred, named Dark Crisis On Infinite Earths which began in June 2022 and ended in December 2022. This series was written by Joshua Williamson and art by Daniel Sampere and Alejandro Sanchez. Following the death of the Justice League in issue #75 Pariah has tasked Deathstroke and the Secret Society of Super Villains to start a Crisis Event, and using the crisis energy which would form, restart and bring back the infinite earths lost in the original Crisis. Nightwing and the Titans work to protect the world from the Secret Society, while Hal Jordan investigates the deaths of the Justice League.

== Adaptations ==
- The comic book series was adapted as a novel by the original writer, Marv Wolfman. This novelization was then performed as an audio drama marketed as a "Movie in Your Mind" by publisher GraphicAudio.
- The story serves as inspiration for "Crisis on Infinite Earths", an Arrowverse crossover event consisting of an episode each of Arrow, The Flash, Supergirl, Legends of Tomorrow, and Batwoman between December 2019 and January 2020.
- An animated film adaptation, Justice League: Crisis on Infinite Earths, was released in three parts during 2024, beginning with Part One on January 9, 2024, Part Two on April 29, and Part Three on July 16.
