= List of Dark Horse Comics publications =

Dark Horse Comics is an American comic book company. These are the ongoing and current limited series publications it has released under its own brand.

Comics published through their various imprints appear on the List of Dark Horse Comics imprint publications, collected editions of its own publications appear on the List of Dark Horse Comics collected editions, and reprints appear on the List of Dark Horse Comics reprints.

Denotes limited series
Denotes one-shot or series of one-shots

== 0–9 ==
Title	Series	Issues	Dates	Notes
The 1,001 Nights of Bacchus		nn	May 1993	
The 13th Son		#1–4	Nov 2005 – Feb 2006	Kelly Jones' The 13th Son: Worse Thing Waiting on cover #1 and #2 both dated November 2005
2 Past Midnight		#1–3	Jan – Mar 2013	Listed in Dark Horse catalog as Two Past Midnight; Project Black Sky imprint Collected in 2 Past Midnight trade paperback
3 Story: Secret Files of the Giant Man		nn	Apr 2012	
3 Story: The Secret History of the Giant Man		nn	Sep 2009	Hardcover graphic novel
300		#1–5	May – Sep 1998	
365 Days with Winnie the Pooh		nn	Nov 2019	Graphic novel
365 Samurai and a Few Bowls of Rice		nn	Dec 2009	Graphic novel
3×3 Eyes: Curse of the Gesu		#1–5	Oct 1995 – Feb 1996	Dark Horse Manga imprint
47 Ronin		#1–5	Nov 2012 – Jul 2013	
9-11: Artists Respond		Vol. 1	Jan 2002	Numbering continues with 9-11: The World's Finest Comic Book Writers & Artists Tell Stories to Remember, Volume Two (DC Comics, 2002)

== A ==
Title	Series	Issues	Dates	Notes
Abe Sapien		#1–36 (#11–46)	Apr 2013 – Aug 2016	
Abe Sapien		#1 (#11–46)	Nov 2013	#1 for $1 edition
Abe Sapien: Drums of the Dead		nn	Mar 1998	Only issue not included in overall series numbering
Abe Sapien: The Abyssal Plain		#1–2 (#7–8)	Jun 2010 – Jul 2010	
Abe Sapien: The Devil Does Not Jest		#1–2 (#9–10)	Sep 2011 – Oct 2011	
Abe Sapien: The Drowning		#1–5	Feb 2008 – Jun 2008	
Abe Sapien: The Haunted Boy		nn (#6)	Oct 2009	
The Abyss		#1–2	undated (Jun – Jul 1989)	Adaptation of movie
Accident Man		#1–3	undated (Jun – Aug 1993)	Reprints stories published in Toxic! by Apocalypse Ltd
Adam.3		#1–4	Aug 2015 – Feb 2016	
The Adventures of Luther Arkwright		#1–9	Mar 1990 – Feb 1991	#7 and #8 both dated November 1990; Reprints Valkyrie Press series with new formatting and lettering
The Adventures of Superhero Girl		nn	Feb 2013	Hardcover graphic novel
Adventures of the Mask		#1–7	Jan 1996 – Jul 1996	Based on The Mask Saturday morning cartoon
Adventures of the Mask Toys "R" Us Special Edition!		nn	Oct 1996	Store premium
Aeon Flux		#1–4	Oct 2005 – Jan 2006	Æon Flux on cover, Aeon Flux in indicia Bridges between television series and movie
Age of Reptiles		#1–4	Nov 1993 – Feb 1994	
Age of Reptiles: Ancient Egyptians		#1–4	Jun 2015 – Sep 2015	
Age of Reptiles: The Hunt		#1–5	May 1996 – Sep 1996	
Age of Reptiles: The Journey		#1–4	Nov 2009 – Jul 2010	
Agents of Law		#1–6	Mar 1995 – Sep 1995	Dark Horse Heroes imprint
Akaneiro		#1–3	May 2013 – Jul 2013	Based on Akaneiro: Demon Hunters video game
Alabaster: The Good, the Bad, and the Bird		#1–5	Dec 2015 – Apr 2016	
Alabaster: Wolves		#1–5	Apr 2012 – Aug 2012	
Alice in Sunderland: An Entertainment		nn	Apr 2007	Graphic novel
Alien^{3}	2	#1–3	Jun 1992 – Jul 1992	Adaptation of movie #2 and #3 both dated July 1992
Alien 3 Movie Special		nn	Jan 1992	Magazine format Dark Horse International imprint
Alien Resurrection		#1–2	Oct 1997 – Nov 1997	Adaptation of movie
Alien vs. Predator: Civilized Beasts		nn	Apr 2008	Sequel to Thrill of the Hunt
Alien vs. Predator: Fire and Stone		#1–4	Oct 2014 – Jan 2015	
Alien vs. Predator: Thrill of the Hunt		nn	Oct 2004	Adaptation of Alien vs. Predator
Aliens	1	#1–6	May 1988 – Jul 1989	Sequel to the movie
Aliens	Vol. 2	#1–4	Aug 1989 – May 1990	#1 reprinted Mar 1990
Aliens		nn	Feb 1989	Mini-comic included with Aliens Portfolio
Aliens	3	#17	Jun 1992	Magazine-format reprints Formerly published by Trident Comics; Dark Horse International imprint
Aliens	4	#1–21	Jul 1992 – Mar 1994	British magazine published under Dark Horse International imprint mostly serialised reprints of American stories although two original stories appeared: "Sacrifice", published in North America as a one-shot, and "Crusade", the final chapter of which was never published
Aliens	5	#1–4	May 2009 – Dec 2009	
Aliens: Alchemy		#1–3	Oct 1997 – Nov 1997	#2 and #3 both dated November 1997
Aliens: Apocalypse – The Destroying Angels		#1–4	Jan 1999 – May 1999	
Aliens: Berserker		#1–4	Jan 1995 – Apr 1995	
Aliens: Cauldron		nn	Jun 2007	Novel
Aliens: Colonial Marines		#1–10	Jan 1993 – Jul 1994	Originally planned for twelve issues but reduced as of #8
Aliens: Countdown		nn	Mar 1993	Minicomic included with Aliens magazine V2#9, with second half of story printed as integral part of V2#10; Reprints serial from Dark Horse Insider Volume 1 #14–20; Dark Horse International imprint
Aliens: Criminal Enterprise		nn	Jan 2008	Novel
Aliens: Defiance		#1–12	Apr 2016 – Jun 2017	
Aliens: DNA		nn	May 2006	Novel
Aliens: Earth Angel		nn	Aug 1994	
Aliens: Earth War		#1–4	Jun 1990 – Oct 1990	#1 reprinted July 1990
Aliens: Fast Track to Heaven			Nov 2011	Hardcover graphic novella
Aliens: Fire and Stone		#1–4	Sep 2014 – Dec 2014	
Aliens: Genocide		#1–4	Nov 1991 – Feb 1992	
Aliens: Glass Corridor		nn	Jun 1998	
Aliens: Havoc		#1–2	Jun 1997 – Jul 1997	
Aliens: Hive		#1–4	Feb 1992 – May 1992	
Aliens: Inhuman Condition		nn	Apr 2013	Hardcover graphic novella
Aliens: Kidnapped		#1–3	Dec 1997 – Feb 1998	
Aliens: Labyrinth		#1–4	Sep 1993 – Jan 1994	
Aliens: Lovesick		nn	Dec 1996	
Aliens: Mondo Heat		nn	Feb 1996	Indicia erroneously states published monthly
Aliens: Mondo Pest		nn	Apr 1995	Collects "Mondo Pest" stories from Dark Horse Comics #22–24
Aliens: More Than Human		nn	Apr 2010	
Aliens: Music of the Spears		#1–4	Jan 1994 – Apr 1994	
Aliens: Newt's Tale		#1–2	Jun 1992 – Jul 1992	
Aliens: No Exit		nn	Oct 2008	Novel
Aliens: Original Sin		nn	Oct 2005	Novel
Aliens: Pig		nn	Mar 1997	
Aliens/Predator: Panel to Panel		nn	Jun 2006	Art book
Aliens/Predator: The Deadliest of the Species		#1–12	Jul 1993 – Aug 1995	
Aliens/Predator: The Deadliest of the Species Hero Premiere Edition Ashcan		#3	Jul 1993	16-page preview bagged with Hero Illustrated #2; Another version given away at Chicago ComiCon 1993
Aliens: Purge		nn	Aug 1997	
Aliens: Rogue		#1–4	Apr 1993 – Jul 1993	
Aliens: Sacrifice		nn	May 1993	Reprints story originally serialised in UK Aliens series
Aliens: Salvation		nn	Nov 1993	
Aliens: Salvation		nn	Sep 2015	Deluxe hardcover edition
Aliens: Space Marines		#1–12	1993	Minicomics packaged with Aliens action figures sold by Kenner Toys; #13 was Aliens vs. Predator: The Ultimate Battle and did not feature Space Marines characters
Aliens: Special		nn	Jun 1997	
Aliens: Stalker		nn	Jun 1998	
Aliens: Steel Egg		nn	Oct 2007	Novel
Aliens: Stronghold		#1–4	May 1994 – Sep 1994	
Aliens: Survival		#1–3	Feb 1998 – Apr 1998	
Aliens: Tribes		nn	Apr 1992	Hardcover graphic novel
Aliens: Tribes		nn	Aug 1992	1000-copy Limited Edition
Aliens vs. Predator		#0–4	Jun 1990 – Dec 1990	#1 published between #1 and #2 #0 reprints story from Dark Horse Presents #34–36
Aliens vs. Predator		#1	Aug 2010	#1 for $1 edition
Aliens vs. Predator Annual		#1	Jul 1999	
Aliens vs. Predator: Booty		nn	Jan 1996	
Aliens vs. Predator: Duel		#1–2	Mar 1995 – Apr 1995	
Aliens vs. Predator: Eternal		#1–4	Jun 1998 – Sep 1998	
Aliens vs. Predator: One for One		nn	2010	
Aliens vs. Predator: The Ultimate Battle		#13	1993	Minicomic packaged with Kenner Toy's Aliens vs. Predator 2-pack Continues numbering of Aliens: Space Marines minicomics
Aliens vs. Predator: Three World War		#1–6	Jan 2010 – Sep 2010	
Aliens vs. Predator vs. The Terminator		#1–4	Apr 2000 – Jul 2000	Aliens Versus Predator Versus The Terminator on cover
Aliens vs. Predator: War		#0–4	May 1995 – Aug 1995	Aliens Versus Predator on cover #0 and #1 both dated May 1995 #0 reprints stories from Dark Horse Comics Insider Volume 2 #1–14 (Jan 1992 – Feb 1993)
Aliens vs. Predator: Xenogenesis		#1–4	Dec 1999 – Mar 2000	
Aliens: Wraith		nn	Jul 1998	
Aliens: Xenogenesis		#1–4	Aug 1999 – Nov 1999	
Amala's Blade		#0–4	Feb 2013 – Jul 2013	#0 reprints stories from Dark Horse Presents (vol. 2) #9–11
The Amazing Screw-On Head		#1	May 2002	Dark Horse Maverick imprint
The Amazon		#1–3	Mar 2009 – May 2009	Remastered reprint of limited series published by Comico in 1989
The American		#1–8	Jun 1987 – Feb 1989	
The American: Lost in America		#1–4	Jul 1992 – Oct 1992	
The American Special		#1	undated (1990)	
American Splendor		#17	Jul 1993	Numbering continues from self-published series
American Splendor: Bedtime Stories		nn	Jun 2000	Harvey Pekar's American Splendor on cover Dark Horse Maverick imprint
American Splendor: Comic-Con Comics		nn	Aug 1996	
American Splendor: Music Comics		nn	Nov 1997	Collection of strips originally published in The Village Voice
American Splendor: Odds & Ends		nn	Dec 1997	Includes reprints of stories from Dark Horse Presents #100-1, 100–3, 100–4
American Splendor: On the Job		nn	May 1997	
American Splendor: Portrait of the Author in His Declining Years		nn	Apr 2001	
American Splendor Special: A Step Out of the Nest		#1	Aug 1994	
American Splendor: Terminal		nn	Sep 1999	Harvey Pekar's American Splendor on cover Dark Horse Maverick imprint
American Splendor: Transatlantic Comics		nn	Jul 1998	American Splendour: Transatlantic Comics on cover
American Splendor: Unsung Hero		#1–3	Aug 2002 – Oct 2002	Harvey Pekar's American Splendor on cover Dark Horse Maverick imprint
American Splendor: Windfall		#1–2	Sep 1995 – Oct 1995	
Ancient Joe		#1–3	Oct 2001 – Dec 2001	Dark Horse Maverick imprint
Andrew Vachss' Underground		#1–4	Nov 1993 – May 1994	#1 titled Underground on cover
Angel	1	#1–17	Nov 1999 – Apr 2001	Based on the TV series
Angel	2	#1–4	Sep 2001 – May 2002	
Angel & Faith		#1–25	Aug 2011 – Aug 2013	
Angel & Faith Season 10		#1–25	Apr 2014 – Apr 2016	
Animal Confidential		nn	May 1992	
The Answer!		#1–4	Jan 2013 – Apr 2013	
Apocalypse Nerd		#1–6	Jan 2005 – Oct 2007	P. Bagge's Apocalypse Nerd on cover Long delays between most issues
ApocalyptiGirl: An Aria for the End Times		nn	May 2015	Graphic novel
Appleseed Databook		#1–2	Apr 1994 – May 1994	Dark Horse Manga imprint
ArchEnemies		#1–4	Apr 2006 – Jul 2006	
Archie vs. Predator		#1–4	Apr 2015 – Jul 2015	
Archie vs. Predator		nn	Feb 2015	ComicsPRO 2015 Ashcan sent free to stores
Army of Darkness		#1–3	Nov 1992 – Oct 1993	Adaptation of movie with original ending Series later collected by Dynamite Entertainment
The Art of Akaneiro		nn	Sep 2013	Art book
The Art of Hellboy		nn	Mar 2003	Hardcover; Dark Horse Books imprint
The Art of Hellboy		nn	Mar 2004	Softcover; Dark Horse Books imprint
Atlas		#1–4	Feb 1994 – Aug 1994	
AutobioGraphix		nn	Dec 2003	Biographical short stories by Dark Horse contributors Includes reprint of Man with Pen in Hand minicomic by Frank Miller
Aw Yeah Comics: Action Cat!		#1–3	Mar 2016 – May 2016	Series title changes to Aw Yeah Comics: Action Cat and Adventure Bug with #3
Axe Cop		nn	Oct 2012	Halloween ComicFest 2012 giveaway
Axe Cop: Bad Guy Earth		#1–3	Mar 2011 – May 2011	
Axe Cop: Bad Guy Earth		#1	Nov 2014	#1 for $1 edition
Axe Cop: President of the World		#1–3	Jul 2012 – Oct 2012	
Axe Cop: The American Choppers		#1–3	May 2014 – Jul 2014	

== B ==
Title	Series	Issues	Dates	Notes
Babe		#1–4	Jul – Oct 1994	John Byrne's Babe on cover Legend imprint
Babe 2		#1–2	Mar – Apr 1995	John Byrne's Babe 2 on cover Legend imprint
Bad Luck Chuck		#1–4	Mar – Jun 2019	
Badger: Shattered Mirror		#1–4	Jul – Oct 1994	
Badger: Zen Pop Funny-Animal Version		#1–2	Jul – Aug 1994	
Badlands		#1–6	Jul – Dec 1991	
The Bakers Meet Jingle Belle		nn	Dec 2006	The Bakers Meet Paul Dini's Jingle Belle on cover
Barb Wire	1	#1–9	Apr 1994 – Feb 1995	Comics' Greatest World imprint #2, 3, 5, 6 collected in Barb Wire trade paperback Collected in Barb Wire Omnibus
Barb Wire	2	#1–8	Jul 2015 – Feb 2016	Collected in Barb Wire Books 1 (#1–4) and 2 (#5–8)
Barb Wire: Ace of Spades		#1–4	May – Sep 1996	Collected in Barb Wire Omnibus
Barry Windsor-Smith: STORYTELLER	Vol. 1	#1–9	Oct 1996 – Jul 1997	put on irregular schedule after #9, series never resumed
Basil Wolverton's Gateway to Horror		#1	Jun 1988	reprints from 1951, 1952, 1973
Basil Wolverton's Planet of Terror		#1	Oct 1987	reprints
Batman/Aliens		#1–2	Mar – Apr 1997	Copublished with DC Comics
Batman/Aliens II		#1–3	undated (2003)	
Batman/Grendel		#1–2	Jun – Jul 1996	Copublished with DC Comics subtitled book 1: Devil's Bones and book 2: Devils Dance
Batman/Hellboy/Starman		#1–2	Jan – Feb 1999	Copublished with DC Comics
Batman/Tarzan: Claws of the Cat-Woman		#1–4	Sep – Dec 1999	Copublished with DC Comics
Batman versus Predator		#1–3	undated (Dec 1991 – Feb 1992)	Copublished with DC Comics
Batman versus Predator II: Bloodmatch		#1–4	undated (1994–1995)	Copublished with DC Comics
Batman versus Predator III		#1–4	Nov 1997 – Feb 1998	Copublished with DC Comics
Battle Gods: Warriors of the Chaak		#1–9	Apr – Dec 2000	Francisco Ruiz Velasco's Battle Gods: Warriors of the Chaak on cover
Beasts of Burden		#1–4	2009	
Behemoth		#1–4	Jan 2025	
Berger Books Free 2018 Preview		nn	Nov 2017	Ashcan premium Berger Books imprint
Bernie Wrightson's Frankenstein		nn	1994	25th Anniversary edition
Bettie Page Comics		nn	Mar 1996	
Bettie Page Comics: Spicy Adventure		nn	Jan 1997	
Bettie Page: Queen of the Nile		#1–3	Dec 1999 – Apr 2000	
Big		nn	Mar 1989	Hit Comics imprint
Big Blown Baby		#1–4	Aug – Nov 1996	
The Big Guy and Rusty the Boy Robot		#1–2	Jul – Aug 1995	Legend imprint
Bill & Ted Are Doomed		#1–4	Sep – Dec 2020	
Billi 99		#1–4	Sep – Dec 1991	
Billy the Kid's Old Timey Oddities		#1–4	Apr – Jul 2005	
The Black Beetle		#1–4	Dec 2012 – Jun 2013	
The Blackburne Covenant		#1–4	Apr – Jul 2003	
Black Cross: Dirty Work		nn	Apr 1997	
Black Cross Special		nn	Jan 1988	
Blackout		#1–4	Mar – Jul 2014	Project Black Sky imprint Collected in Blackout Volume 1: Into the Dark
The Black Pearl		#1–5	Sep 1996 – Jan 1997	
Blade of the Immortal		#1–131	Jun 1996 – Nov 2007	Dark Horse Manga imprint Titled on cover as limited series and one-shots
Blue Book		#1–5	February–June 2023	Also includes True Weird back-up stories in each issue; Tiny Onion Studios imprint
The Blue Lily		#1–2	Mar – Apr 1993	Four-issue series, cancelled after #2; Rusty Spade, Metaphysical Metal Detective: The Blue Lily on cover
BMWFilms.com's THE HIRE		#1–4	Jul 2004 – Sep 2005	BMWFilms.com Presents THE HIRE on cover Based on the BMW film series #3 and #4 both dated Sep 2005 #1 of 6 was on first issue; later issues made no mention of being a limited series
Bob Burden's Original Mysterymen Presents		#1–4	undated (Jul – Oct 1999)	Bob Burden's Original Mysterymen Comics on cover #1 subtitled Bob Burden's Original Mysterymen Presents #1: Monster in a Shipyard in indicia #4 subtitled Bob Burden's Original Mysterymen Presents #4: All Villains #1 in indicia
Body Bags		nn	Aug 1996	Ashcan premium Blanc Noir imprint
Body Bags		#1–4	Sep 1996 – Jan 1997	Blanc Noir imprint Collected in Body Bags: Father's Day
The Book of Night		#1–3	Jul – Oct 1987	C. Vess' The Book of Night on cover
Boris the Bear		#1–12	Aug 1986 – Oct 1987	#1–5 were undated #1 had second printing #12 published four months after #11; title then moved to Nicotat Comics
Boris the Bear Instant Color Classics		#1–3	Jul – Dec 1997	Reprinted original black-and-white series #2 titled Boris the Bear Instant Color Classic in indicia
B.P.R.D.: 1946		#1–5 (#39–43)	Jan – May 2008	
B.P.R.D. Dark Waters		nn	Jul 2003	
B.P.R.D.: Garden of Souls		#1–5 (#29–33)	Mar – Jul 2007	
B.P.R.D.: Hollow Earth and Other Stories		#1–3	Jan – Jun 2002	
B.P.R.D.: Killing Ground		#1–5 (#34–38)	Aug – Dec 2007	
B.P.R.D. Night Train		nn (#6)	Sep 2003	
B.P.R.D., Plague of Frogs		#1–5 (#8–12)	Mar – Jul 2004	
B.P.R.D., The Black Flame		#1–6 (#18–23)	Sep 2005 – Jan 2006	
B.P.R.D., The Dead		#1–5 (#13–17)	Nov 2004 – Mar 2005	
B.P.R.D.: The Ectoplasmic Man		nn (#45)	Jun 2008	
B.P.R.D. The Soul of Venice		nn (#4)	May 2003	
B.P.R.D.: The Universal Machine		#1–5 (#24–28)	Apr – Aug 2006	
B.P.R.D.: The Warning		#1–3 (#46–48)	Jul – Sep 2008	
B.P.R.D. There's Something Under My Bed		nn (#7)	Nov 2003	
B.P.R.D.: War on Frogs		#1–4 (#44, 51, 57, 63)	Jun 2008 – Dec 2009	
Brain Boy		#1–3, 0	Sep – Dec 2013	Project Black Sky imprint Collected in Brain Boy Volume 1: Psy vs. Psy
Brain Boy: The Men from G.E.S.T.A.L.T.		#1–4	May – Aug 2014	#1 has regular and ashcan editions Project Black Sky imprint Collected in Brain Boy Volume 2: The Men from G.E.S.T.A.L.T.
Buffy the Vampire Slayer		#1–63	Sep 1998 – Nov 2003	Based on the TV series #1, #3 undated
Buffy the Vampire Slayer		#½	undated (Apr 1999)	Premium included in Wizard Magazine
Buffy the Vampire Slayer: Angel		#1–3	May – Jul 1999	
Buffy the Vampire Slayer Annual		nn	Aug 1999	
Buffy the Vampire Slayer Chaos Bleeds			Jun 2003	Based on the video game
Buffy the Vampire Slayer: Creatures of Habit		nn	Mar 2002	Illustrated novel
Buffy the Vampire Slayer: Dust Waltz			1998	Original graphic novel
Buffy the Vampire Slayer: Giles		#1	Oct 2000	
Buffy the Vampire Slayer: Haunted		#1–4	Dec 2001 – Mar 2002	
Buffy the Vampire Slayer: Jonathan		#1	Jan 2001	
Buffy the Vampire Slayer: Lost and Found		nn	Mar 2002	
Buffy the Vampire Slayer Lovers Walk		nn	Feb 2001	
Buffy the Vampire Slayer: Oz		#1–3	Jul – Sep 2001	
Buffy the Vampire Slayer: Reunion		nn	Jun 2002	
Buffy the Vampire Slayer Season Eight		#1–40	Mar 2007 – Jan 2011	Canonical continuation of the TV series
Buffy the Vampire Slayer Season Nine		#1–25	Nov 2011 – Sep 2013	Canonical continuation of the TV series
Buffy the Vampire Slayer: Spike and Dru		nn, #2–3	Apr 1999 – Dec 2000	One-shots
Buffy the Vampire Slayer: Tales of the Slayers	1	nn	Nov 2001	Trade paperback anthology
Buffy the Vampire Slayer: Tales of the Slayers	2	#1	Oct 2002	
Buffy the Vampire Slayer: The Origin		#1–3	Jan – Mar 1999	Adapted from original Joss Whedon screenplay
Buffy the Vampire Slayer: Willow & Tara		#1	Apr 2001	
Buffy the Vampire Slayer: Willow & Tara – Wilderness		#1–2	Jul – Sep 2002	

== C ==
Title	Series	Issues	Dates	Notes
Call of Duty: Black Ops III		#1–6	Nov 2015 – Sep 2016	
Captain Midnight		#0–24	Jun 2013 – Jun 2015	Project Black Sky imprint #5–24; Collected in Captain Midnight Volumes 1–6 (#0–3, 4–7, 8–11, 12–15, 16–19, 20–24)
Catalyst: Agents of Change		#1–7	Feb – Sep 1994	Comics' Greatest World imprint
Catalyst Comix		#1–9	Jul 2013 – Mar 2014	Collected in Catalyst Comix trade paperback
Cheval Noir		#1–50	Aug 1989 – Jan 1994	
Chickenhare: Fire in the Hole		nn	Apr 2008	Graphic novel Dark Horse Books imprint
Chickenhare: The House of Klaus		nn	Sep 2006	Graphic novel Dark Horse Books imprint
Chosen		#1–3	Jan – Aug 2004	
Chronowar		#1–9	Aug 1996 – Apr 1997	Dark Horse Manga imprint Studio Proteus translation
City of Others		#1–4	Feb – Aug 2007	
Classic Star Wars		#1–20	Aug 1992 – Jun 1994	Reprints newspaper strips by Archie Goodwin and Al Williamson
Classic Star Wars: Devilworlds		#1–2	Aug – Sep 1996	Reprints series from Marvel UK Star Wars: The Empire Strikes Back magazine
Classic Star Wars: Han Solo at Stars' End		#1–3	Mar – May 1997	Reprints newspaper adaptation of novel by Brian Daley
Classic Star Wars: The Early Adventures		#1–9	Aug 1994 – Apr 1995	Reprints 1979–80 newspaper strips by Russ Manning
Classic Star Wars: The Vandelhelm Mission		nn	Mar 1995	Reprints Marvel Star Wars #98
Clonezone Special		#1	undated (Mar 1989)	
Colder		#1–5	Nov 2012 – Mar 2013	
Colors in Black		#1–4	Mar – Jun 1995	
Comics' Greatest World: Barb Wire		nn	Aug 1993	Has regular and Silver editions Comics' Greatest World imprint Collected in Comics' Greatest World: Steel Harbor; Collected in Dark Horse Heroes Omnibus Volume 1
Comics' Greatest World: Catalyst: Agents of Change		nn	Aug 1993	Comics' Greatest World imprint Collected in Comics' Greatest World: Golden City; Collected in Dark Horse Heroes Omnibus Volume 1
Comics' Greatest World: Division 13		nn	Sep 1993	Comics' Greatest World imprint Collected in Comics' Greatest World: Vortex (Cinnabar Flats); Collected in Dark Horse Heroes Omnibus Volume 1
Comics' Greatest World: Ghost		nn	Jun 1993	Comics' Greatest World imprint Collected in Comics' Greatest World: Arcadia; Collected in Dark Horse Heroes Omnibus Volume 1
Comics' Greatest World: Hero Zero		nn	Sep 1994	Comics' Greatest World imprint Collected in Comics' Greatest World: Vortex (Cinnabar Flats); Collected in Dark Horse Heroes Omnibus Volume 1
Comics' Greatest World: King Tiger		nn	Sep 1993	Comics' Greatest World imprint Collected in Comics' Greatest World: Vortex (Cinnabar Flats); Collected in Dark Horse Heroes Omnibus Volume 1
Comics' Greatest World: Mecha		nn	Jul 1993	Comics' Greatest World imprint Collected in Comics' Greatest World: Golden City; Collected in Dark Horse Heroes Omnibus Volume 1
Comics' Greatest World: Monster		nn	Jul 1993	Comics' Greatest World imprint Collected in Comics' Greatest World: Arcadia; Collected in Dark Horse Heroes Omnibus Volume 1
Comics' Greatest World: Motorhead		nn	Aug 1993	Comics' Greatest World imprint Collected in Comics' Greatest World: Steel Harbor; Collected in Dark Horse Heroes Omnibus Volume 1
Comics' Greatest World: Out of the Vortex		nn	Sep 1993	Comics' Greatest World imprint Collected in Comics' Greatest World: Vortex (Cinnabar Flats); Collected in Dark Horse Heroes Omnibus Volume 1
Comics' Greatest World: Pit Bulls		nn	Jun 1993	Comics' Greatest World imprint Collected in Comics' Greatest World: Arcadia; Collected in Dark Horse Heroes Omnibus Volume 1
Comics' Greatest World: Rebel		nn	Jul 1993	Has regular and Gold editions Comics' Greatest World imprint Collected in Comics' Greatest World: Golden City; Collected in Dark Horse Heroes Omnibus Volume 1
Comics' Greatest World: Sourcebook		nn	Mar 1993	Premium; Comics' Greatest World imprint
Comics' Greatest World: The Machine		nn	Aug 1993	Comics' Greatest World imprint Collected in Comics' Greatest World: Steel Harbor; Collected in Dark Horse Heroes Omnibus Volume 1
Comics' Greatest World: Titan		nn	Jul 1993	Comics' Greatest World imprint Collected in Comics' Greatest World: Golden City; Collected in Dark Horse Heroes Omnibus Volume 1
Comics' Greatest World: Wolf Gang		nn	Aug 1993	Comics' Greatest World imprint Collected in Comics' Greatest World: Steel Harbor; Collected in Dark Horse Heroes Omnibus Volume 1
Comics' Greatest World: X		nn	Jun 1993	Has Black and White Press Proof Edition, Capital City Special Edition, and Diamond Distribution Special Edition; Comics' Greatest World imprint Collected in Comics' Greatest World: Arcadia; Collected in Dark Horse Heroes Omnibus Volume 1
Conan		#1–50	Feb 2004 – May 2008	
Conan and the Daughters of Midora		nn	Oct 2004	
Conan and the Demons of Khitai		#1–4	Oct 2005 – Jan 2006	
Conan and the Jewels of Gwahlur		#1–3	Apr – Jun 2005	#2 and #3 both dated Jun 2005
Conan and the Midnight God		#1–5	Jan – Apr 2007	#4 and #5 both dated Apr 2007
Conan and the Songs of the Dead		#1–5	Jul – Nov 2006	
Conan – Free Comic Book Day 2006 Special		nn	May 2006	One-shot flipbook with Star Wars – Free Comic Book Day 2006 Special
Conan Funcom Special		nn	Jul 2006	Age of Conan: Hyborian Adventures on cover
Conan: The Book of Thoth		#1–4	Mar – Jun 2006	Conan: Book of Thoth on cover
Conan the Cimmerian		#0–25	Jun 2008 – Nov 2010	
Conan: The Frazetta Cover Series		#1–8	Dec 2007 – Jul 2011	Title lacks colon in indicia of #1, 2, and 4 #2 subtitled The God in the Bowl in indicia
Conan: The Legend		#0	Nov 2003	
Concrete		#1–10	Mar 1987 – Nov 1988	#1 officially titled Paul Chadwick's Concrete #2–10 Paul Chadwick's Concrete on cover
Concrete Celebrates Earth Day 1990		#1	Apr 1990	
Concrete Color Special		#1	Feb 1989	
Concrete: Eclectica		#1–2	Apr – May 1993	
Concrete: Fragile Creature		#1–4	Jun 1991 – Feb 1992	
Concrete: Killer Smile		#1–4	Jul – Oct 1994	Legend imprint
Concrete: Strange Armor		#1–5	Dec 1997 – May 1998	Paul Chadwick's Concrete: Strange Armor on cover Legend imprint
Concrete: The Human Dilemma		#1–6	Dec 2004 – May 2005	
Concrete: Think Like a Mountain		#1–6	Mar – Aug 1996	Paul Chadwick's Concrete: Think Like a Mountain on cover Legend imprint
Cormac Mac Art		#1–4	undated (Jan – Apr 1990)	
Corny's Fetish		nn	Apr 1998	
Creatures of the Night		nn	Nov 2004	Hardcover graphic novel
Creepy: The Limited Series		Book 1–4	undated (Mar – Sep 1992)	Copublished with Harris Comics
Criminal Macabre: A Cal McDonald Mystery		#1–5	May – Sep 2003	
Criminal Macabre: Call Me Monster		nn	2011	Free Comic Book Day giveaway
Criminal Macabre: Cell Block 666		#1–4 (#25–28)	Sep 2008	Subtitled in indicia as part of regular series
Criminal Macabre: Die, Die, My Darling!		nn	2012	
Criminal Macabre: Feat of Clay		nn (#16)	Jun 2006	Subtitled in indicia as part of regular series
Criminal Macabre: Final Night		#1–4		
Criminal Macabre: My Demon Baby		#1–4 (#21–24)	Sep 2007 – Apr 2008	Subtitled in indicia as part of regular series
Criminal Macabre: No Peace for Old Men		nn	2011	
Criminal Macabre: Supernatural Freak Machine		#4–5 (#11–15)		#1–3 published by IDW
Criminal Macabre: The Eyes of Frankenstein		#1–4	2013	
Criminal Macabre: The Iron Spirit		nn	2012	Hardcover one-shot
Criminal Macabre: The Third Child		#1–4	2014	
Criminal Macabre: They Fight by Night		nn	2012	
Criminal Macabre: Two Red Eyes		#1–4 (#17–20)	Dec 2006 – Mar 2007	
Criminal Macabre: When Freaks Collide		nn		
Critical Error		nn	Jul 1992	
Critical Role: Vox Machina Origins	I	#1–6	Sep 2017 – Apr 2018	Has Standard Edition, Limited Edition, and Trade paperback Collected in Critical Role: Vox Machina Origins Series I & II Library Edition
Critical Role: Vox Machina Origins	II	#1–6	Jul 2019 – Feb 2020	Has Limited Edition and Trade paperback Collected in Critical Role: Vox Machina Origins Series I & II Library Edition
Critical Role: Vox Machina Origins	III	#1–6	Feb 2021 – May 2022	Has Limited Edition and Trade paperback
Critical Role: Vox Machina Origins	IV	#1–6	May 2024 – TBA	
Cromwell Stone		nn	Apr 1992	
Cross		#0–6	Oct 1995 – Apr 1996	Andrew Vachss' Cross on cover
Crush		#1–4	Oct 2003 – Jan 2004	Rocket Comics imprint
The Curse of Dracula		#1–3	Jul – Sep 1998	
Cyberantics		nn	undated (Mar 1992)	Hardcover graphic novel

== D ==
Title	Series	Issues	Dates	Notes
Damn Nation		#1–3	Feb – Apr 2005	
Danger Unlimited		#1–4	Feb – May 1994	Legend imprint
Dark Horse Action Figure Comics		#1–2	Aug – Nov 1998	Premiums included with action figures Issues are subtitled in indicia: #2 Dark Horse Action Figure Comics #2: Martha Washington
The Dark Horse Book of Hauntings		nn	undated (Aug 2003)	Hardcover anthology First appearance of Beasts of Burden
The Dark Horse Book of Monsters		nn	Dec 2006	Hardcover anthology
The Dark Horse Book of The Dead		nn	Jun 2005	Hardcover anthology
The Dark Horse Book of Witchcraft		nn	Jun 2004	Hardcover anthology
Dark Horse Classics		#1	May 1996	Reprints stories from Dark Horse Comics
Dark Horse Comics		#1–25	Aug 1992 – Sep 1994	#19–24 Comics' Greatest World imprint #25 has Acme Edition; Many individual stories collected
Dark Horse Down Under		#1–3	Jun – Oct 1994	
Dark Horse Insider	1	#1–28	Jul 1989 – Dec 1991	Monthly promotional publication
Dark Horse Insider	2	#1–48	Jan 1992 – Dec 1995	Monthly promotional publication
Dark Horse Insider	3	#1–20	Jan 1996 – Aug 1997	Monthly promotional publication
Dark Horse Maverick 2000		nn	Jul 2000	
Dark Horse Maverick 2001		nn	Jul 2001	
Dark Horse Monsters		#1	Feb 1997	
Dark Horse Presents	1	#1–157	Jul 1986 – Sep 2000	#1 has Dark Horse Commemorative Edition second printing #1–3 undated #100 has five different issues, numbered #100-1 through #100-5 pairs of issues with same date occur
Dark Horse Presents		#100–0	Jul 1995	Hero Illustrated Special; Published one month before #100-1 through #100-5
Dark Horse Presents	MDHP	#1–36	Aug 2007 – Jul 2010	Electronic format, published on MySpace
Dark Horse Presents	Vol 2	#1–36	Apr 2011 – May 2014	
Dark Horse Presents	Vol 3	#1–33	Aug 2014 – Apr 2017	
Dark Horse Presents Annual 1997		nn	Feb 1998	Dark Horse Presents Annual 1998 in indicia but 1997 on cover and table of contents earlier annuals were part of regular series numbering
Dark Horse Presents Annual 1998		nn	Sep 1998	
Dark Horse Presents Annual 1999		nn	Aug 1999	
Dark Horse Presents Annual 2000		nn	Jun 2000	
Dark Horse Presents Fifth Anniversary Special		nn	Apr 1991	
Dark Horse Twenty Years (25¢ issue)		nn	undated (2006)	
Darkness Falls, The Tragic Life of Matilda Dixon		nn	undated (2003)	
Dead in the West		#1–2	Oct 1993 – Mar 1994	Joe R. Lansdale's Dead in the West on cover
Dead or Alive – A Cyberpunk Western		#1–4	Apr – Jul 1998	Shok Studio translation
Dead Rider		#2	Feb 2008	Intended as four-issue series, third and fourth issues never published Kevin Ferrara's The Dead Rider on cover Formerly The Deadlander
The Deadlander		#1	Oct 2007	Kevin Ferrara's The Deadlander on cover Title changed to Dead Rider with #2
Deadline USA	1	#1–3	Sep 1991 – Jan 1992	
Deadline USA	2	#1–8	Apr – Nov 1992	
A Decade of Dark Horse		#1–4	Jul – Oct 1996	
Dept H		#1–24	Apr 2016 – Mar 2018	
The Devil's Footprints		#1–4	Mar – Jun 2003	
Diablo: Tales of Sanctuary		nn	Nov 2001	
Digimon Digital Monsters		#1–12	May – Nov 2000	
The Dirty Pair: Fatal but not Serious		#1–5	Jul – Nov 1995	Dark Horse Manga imprint
The Dirty Pair: Run from the Future		#1–4	Jan – Apr 2000	
The Dirty Pair: Sim Hell		#1–4	May – Aug 1993	Studio Proteus imprint
The Dirty Pair: Sim Hell Remastered		#1–4	May – Aug 2001	Studio Proteus translation
The Dirty Pair: Start the Violence		nn	Sep 1999	Reprints stories from Dark Horse Presents #132–134
Division 13		#1–4	Sep 1994 – Jan 1995	Comics' Greatest World imprint
Doc Savage: Curse of the Fire God		#1–4	Sep – Dec 1995	
Doc Stearn...Mr. Monster		Vol. 2 #1–8	Feb 1988 – Jul 1991	#1 officially titled Mr. Monster #1–7 Michael T. Gilbert's Doc Stearn... Mr. Monster on cover #8 Michael T. Gilbert's The Death of Doc Stearn... Mr. Monster on cover
Dollhouse			Aug 2010	
Dominion: Conflict 1		#1–6	Mar – Aug 1996	Dark Horse Manga imprint Studio Proteus translation
Dota 2: The Comic Collection		nn	Jul 2017	Physical release of the webcomics based on the video game, Dota 2
Dr. Giggles		#1–2	Oct 1992	Based on screenplay of the movie Both issues dated Oct 1992
Dr. Robot Special		nn	Apr 2000	Reprints stories from Madman Comics #12–15
Drawing on Your Nightmares		#1	Oct 2003	

== E ==
Title	Series	Issues	Dates	Notes
Edgar Rice Burroughs' At the Earth's Core		nn	Aug 2015	Hardcover graphic novel Limited edition published same month under Sequential Pulp Comics imprint
Edgar Rice Burroughs' Jungle Tales of Tarzan		nn	Jun 2015	Hardcover graphic novel Limited edition published same month under Sequential Pulp Comics imprint
Edgar Rice Burroughs' Tarzan: A Tale of Mugambi		nn	Jun 1995	
Edgar Rice Burroughs' Tarzan: The Lost Adventure	Vol. 1	#1–4	Jan – Apr 1995	
Edgar Rice Burroughs' Tarzan: The Rivers of Blood		#1–4	Nov 1999 – Feb 2000	Planned as eight-issue series, cancelled after #4 #1–2 Edgar Rice Burroughs' Tarzan – The River of Blood
Edgar Rice Burroughs' The Return of Tarzan		#1–3	Apr 11 – Jun 1997	
Elric: Stormbringer		#1–7	undated (1997)	Copublished with Topps Comics; Collected in Elric: Stormbringer, copublished with Topps Comics
El Zombo Fantasma		#1–3	Apr – Jun 2004	Rocket Comics imprint
Emily Strange	1	#1–6	Aug 2005 – May 2007	
Emily Strange	2	#1–4	Aug 2007 – Aug 2008	All issues have subtitle in indicia: #1 The Death Issue; #2 The Fake Issue; #3 The Revenge Issue; #4 The Alone Issue
Emily Strange	3	#1–4	Jul 2009 – Oct 2010	
Empowered		Vol. 1 – on	Mar 2007 – current	Dark Horse Books imprint
The End League		#1–9	Dec 2007 – Oct 2009	
The Escapists		#1–6	Jul – Dec 2006	
The Evil Dead		#1–4	Jan – Apr 2008	Based on the movie

== F ==
Title	Series	Issues	Dates	Notes
F5 Origin		nn	Nov 2001	#1 on cover
Fax from Sarajevo		nn	Oct 1996	Hardcover graphic novel
Fax from Sarajevo		nn	Oct 1998	Trade paperback
Fear Agent		#17–21	Nov 2007 – Jun 2008	Fear Agent: Hatchet Job #1–4 on cover
Fear Agent		#24–32	Oct 2008 – Nov 2011	Noted on cover as limited series and one-shots: #24–27 I Against I #3–6; #28–32 Out of Step #1–6
Fear Agent: I Against I		#1–2 (#22–23)	Jun 2008 – Jul 2009	Title changed to part of regular series with third issue
Fear Agent: The Last Goodbye		#1–4 (#12–15)	Jun – Sep 2007	
Fierce		#1–4	Jul – Dec 2004	Rocket Comics imprint
The Fifth Beatle		nn	Nov 2013	Hardcover graphic novel
Flaming Carrot Annual		#1	Jan 1997	
Flaming Carrot Comics		#18–31	Jun 1988 – Oct 1994	Previously published by Renegade Press #18 undated
Flaming Carrot & Reid Fleming, World's Toughest Milkman		nn (#32)	Dec 2002	Subnumbered as part of Flaming Carrot series
Flaxen		#1	undated (Jul 1992)	Copublished with Golden Apple Comics
Floaters		#1–5	Sep 1993 – Jan 1994	
The Foot Soldiers		#1–4	Jan – Apr 1996	
Fort: Prophet of the Unexplained		#1–4	Jun – Sep 2002	
Fray		#1–8	Jun 2001 – Jul 2003	#1 and #2 had second printings publication sporadic after #5
Freaks' Amour		#1–3	Jul – Nov 1992	
Freaks of the Heartland		#1–6	Jan – Nov 2004	
Free Comic Book Day		nn	Apr 2007	One-shot giveaway The Umbrella Academy, Pantheon City, ZeroKiller
Free Comic Book Day: Project Black Sky		nn	May 2014	Project Black Sky imprint
Fused		#1–4	Dec 2003 – Mar 2004	Rocket Comics imprint

== G ==
Title	Series	Issues	Dates	Notes
Galactic		#1–3	Aug – Oct 2003	Rocket Comics imprint
Gamera		#1–4	Aug – Nov 1996	
Gary Gianni's The MonsterMen		nn	Aug 1999	Dark Horse Maverick imprint
Ghost	1	#1–36	Apr 1995 – Apr 1998	#1–9 Dark Horse Heroes imprint Collected in Ghost Volumes 1–4 (#1–3, 5; #6–9, 26–27; #20–25; #28–32); Collected in Ghost Omnibus Volumes 1–3 (#1–12, #13–26, #27–36)
Ghost	2	#1–22	Sep 1998 – Aug 2000	Collected in Ghost Omnibus Volumes 4–5 (#1–11, #12–22)
Ghost	3	#0–4	Sep 2012 – Mar 2013	Collected in Ghost Volume 1: In the Smoke and Din
Ghost	4	#1–12	Sep 1996 – Jan 1997	Project Black Sky imprint #2–12; Collected in Ghost Volumes 2–4 (#1–4, 5–8, 9–12)
Ghost and The Shadow		nn	Dec 1995	
Ghost/Batgirl		#1–4	Aug – Dec 2000	Copublished with DC Comics
Ghostbusters: Back in Town		#1–4	Mar 2024 –	
Ghost Handbook		nn	Aug 1999	
Ghost/Hellboy Special		#1–2	May – Jun 1996	Ghost/Hellboy on cover
Ghost in the Shell		#1–8	Mar – Oct 1995	Collected edition published by Titan Books
Ghost in the Shell 1.5: Human-Error Processor		#1–8	Oct 2006 – May 2007	Dark Horse Manga imprint
Ghost in the Shell 2: Man-Machine Interface		#1–11	Jan – Dec 2003	Translation produced by Studio Proteus
Ghost Special		nn	Jul 1994	Comics' Greatest World imprint #1 collected in Ghost Stories, Ghost V2#1, and Ghost Omnibus Volume 1 #2–3 collected in Ghost Omnibus Volume 3
Ghost Special		#2–3	Jun – Dec 1998	
GIANTS	OS	#1	Dec 2017	Kaiju successor of Godzilla, gamera and Base on video game Published by Nintendo for 2018
GIANTS	1	#1	Dec 2017 – Apr 2018	
GI Joe	1	#1–4	Dec 1995 – Apr 1996	Volume 1
GI Joe	2	#1–4	Jun – Sep 1996	Volume 2
Girl Crazy		#1–3	May – Jul 1996	
Give Me Liberty		#1–4	Jun 1990 – Apr 1991	
Go Boy 7		#1–6	Jul 2003 – Mar 2004	Rocket Comics imprint
God of War	1	#0–4	Apr 2018 – Feb 2019	Based on the God of War video game series. The first comic series serves as a prequel story of the 2018 video game. #0 released digitally via the game's collector's editions (April 2018). #1–4 published in print (November 2018 – February 2019). Collected in Volume 1 (#0–4).
God of War	2	#1–4	Mar – Jun 2021	Subtitled Fallen God, prequel story that takes place between God of War III and the previous comic series. Collected in Volume 2: Fallen God (#1–4).
Godzilla	1	#1–6	May 1988 – Jan 1989	Based on the movie Translation of Japanese series published by Shogakukan
Godzilla	2	#0–16	May 1995 – Sep 1996	
Godzilla Color Special		#1	Summer 1992	
Godzilla, King of the Monsters Special		#1	Aug 1987	
Godzilla vs. Barkley		nn	Dec 1993	
Godzilla Versus Hero Zero		#1	Jul 1995	Collected in Godzilla: Age of Monsters
The Goon	3	#1–44	Jun 2003 – Nov 2013	Earlier series published by Avatar Press and Albatross Exploding Funny Books; Publication sporadic
The Goon Noir		#1–3	Sep 2006 – Jan 2007	Dwight T. Albatross's The Goon Noir on cover
The Goon 25¢ Edition		nn	Sep 2005	
Grandville		nn	Oct 2009	Graphic novel
Green Lantern Versus Aliens		#1–4	Sep – Dec 2000	Copublished with DC Comics
Grendel: Behold the Devil		#0	Jul 2007	
Grendel: Behold the Devil		#1–8	Nov 2007 – Jun 2008	
Grendel: Black, White, & Red		#1–4	Nov 1998 – Feb 1999	
Grendel Classics		#1–2	Jul – Aug 1995	
Grendel Cycle		nn	Oct 1995	Graphic novel
Grendel: Devil by the Deed		nn	Dec 1997	Reprint of Comico issue
Grendel: Devil Child		#1–2	Jun – Aug 1999	
Grendel: Devil's Legacy		#1–12	Mar 2000 – Feb 2001	Reprints #1–12 of second Comico series Dark Horse Maverick imprint
Grendel: Devil's Reign		#1–7	May – Dec 2004	Reprints #34–40 of second Comico series
Grendel: God and the Devil		#0–10	Jan – Dec 2003	Reprints #23–33 of second Comico series
Grendel: Red, White, & Black		#1–4	Sep – Dec 2002	
Grendel Tales: Devils and Deaths		#1–2	Oct – Nov 1994	
Grendel Tales: Devil's Choices		#1–4	Aug 1999	
Grendel Tales Featuring Devil's Hammer		#1–3	Feb – Apr 1994	
Grendel Tales: Four Devils, One Hell		#1–6	Aug 1993 – Jan 1994	
Grendel Tales: Homecoming		#1–3	Dec 1994 – Feb 1995	
Grendel Tales: The Devil in Our Midst		#1–5	May – Sep 1994	
Grendel Tales: The Devil May Care		#1–6	Dec 1995 – May 1996	
Grendel Tales: The Devil's Apprentice		#1–3	Sep – Nov 1997	
Grendel: The Devil Inside		#1–3	Sep 19 – Nov 2001	Reprints #13–15 of second Comico series Dark Horse Maverick imprint
Grendel: War Child		#1–10	Aug 1992 – Jun 1993	
Grifter and The Mask		#1–2	Sep 1996	Copublished with WildStorm
The Guild		#1–3	Mar – May 2010	Based on the webseries Collected in Vol. 1 TPB, Library Edition HC
The Guild		nn	Dec 2010 – Dec 2011, May 2012	Five one-shots (Vork, Tink, Bladezz, Clara, Zaboo), collected in Vol. 2 TPB Sixth one-shot (Fawkes) followed Collected in Library Edition HC

== H ==
Title	Series	Issues	Dates	Notes
The Halloween Legion		nn	Sep 2013	Hardcover graphic novel Sequential Pulp Comics imprint
Halo: Escalation		#1–24	Dec 2013 – Nov 2015	
Halo: Initiation		#1–3	Aug – Oct 2013	
The Hammer		#1–4	Oct 1997 – Jan 1998	Kelley Jones' The Hammer on cover
The Hammer: The Outsider		#1–4	Feb – Apr 1999	
Happy Birthday Martha Washington		nn	Mar 1995	Legend imprint
Hard Boiled		#1–3	Sep 1990 – Mar 1992	
Harlan Ellison's Dream Corridor		#1–5	Mar – Jul 1995	
Harlan Ellison's Dream Corridor Quarterly		#1	Aug 1996	Volume 2
Harlan Ellison's Dream Corridor Special		nn	Jan 1995	Second edition published August 1995
Harlequin Valentine		nn	Nov 2001	Graphic novel Dark Horse Books imprint
Harrow County		#1–32	May 2015 – Jun 2018	
Haunted Man		#1	Mar 2000	Planned for three issues, cancelled after #1
Hazel and Cha Cha Save Christmas: Tales from the Umbrella Academy		nn	Nov 2019	
Heartbreakers		#1–4	Apr – Jul 1996	
Heart of Empire		#1–9	Apr – Dec 1999	
Hell		#1–4	Jul 2003 – Mar 2004	Rocket Comics imprint
Hellboy: Almost Colossus		#1–2 (#12–13)	Jun – Jul 1997	
Hellboy Animated: The Black Wedding		nn	Jan 2007	Graphic novel Dark Horse Books imprint
Hellboy Animated: The Menagerie		nn	Nov 2007	Graphic novel Dark Horse Books imprint
Hellboy Animated: The Yearning		nn	May 2007	Graphic novel Dark Horse Books imprint
Hellboy: Box Full of Evil		#1–2 (#15–16)	Aug – Sep 1999	Dark Horse Maverick imprint
Hellboy Christmas Special		nn (#14)	Dec 1997	
Hellboy: Conqueror Worm		#1–4 (#17–20)	May – Aug 2001	Dark Horse Maverick imprint
Hellboy: Darkness Calls		#1–6 (#27–32)	Apr – Nov 2007	
Hellboy: Free Comic Book Day		nn	Apr 2008	
Hellboy, Jr.		#1–2	Oct – Nov 1999	Comics from Hell imprint
Hellboy, Jr., Halloween Special		nn	Oct 1997	Comics from Hell imprint
Hellboy: Makoma, or, A Tale Told by a Mummy in New York City Explorers' Club on August 16, 1993		#1–2 (#25–26)	Feb 2006	
Hellboy Premiere Edition		nn	undated (2004)	Wizard World Los Angeles premium
Hellboy: Seed of Destruction		#1–4	Mar – Jun 1994	
Hellboy, The Corpse		nn	Mar 2004	25¢ comic
Hellboy: The Corpse and the Iron Shoes		nn (#6)	undated (Jan 1996)	Legend imprint
Hellboy: The Crooked Man		#1–3 (#33–35)	Jul – Sep 2008	
Hellboy: The Golden Army		nn	Jan 2008	Free comic released at conventions and movie premiere
Hellboy: The Island		#1–2 (#23–24)	Jun – Jul 2005	
Hellboy: The Third Wish		#1–2 (#21–22)	Jul – Aug 2002	Dark Horse Maverick imprint
Hellboy: Wake the Devil		#1–5 (#7–11)	Jun – Oct 1996	Legend imprint
Hellboy: Weird Tales		#1–8	Feb 2003 – Apr 2004	
Hellgate: London		#0	May/Oct 2006	
Hellgate: London		#1–3	Nov 1996 – Mar 2007	Based on the video game
Hellhounds: Panzer Cops		#1–6	Jan – Jul 1994	Dark Horse Manga imprint
The Helm		#1–4	Jul – Nov 2008	
The Heretic		#1–4	Nov 1996 – Mar 1997	Blanc Noir imprint Collected in The Heretic trade paperback
Hero Zero		#0	Sep 1994	Comics' Greatest World imprint
H.G. Wells' The War of the Worlds		nn	2006	Graphic novel
Hieroglyph		#1–4	Nov 1999 – Feb 2000	Dark Horse Maverick imprint
The Hound of the Baskervilles		nn	Feb 2013	Hardcover graphic novel Sequential Pulp Comics imprint
House of Gold & Bones		#1–4	Apr – Jul 2013	
The Horror of Collier County		#1–5	Oct 1999 – Feb 2000	Dark Horse Maverick imprint
House of Night		#1–5	Nov 2011 – Mar 2012	
The Hunchback of Notre Dame		nn	Jul 2012	Hardcover graphic novel Sequential Pulp Comics imprint
Hungry Ghosts		#1–4	Jan – Apr 2018	Berger Books imprint
HyperSonic		#1–4	Nov 1997 – Feb 1998	

== I ==
Title	Series	Issues	Dates	Notes
Illegal Alien		nn	Jun 2003	Reprints Kitchen Sink Press graphic novel
Incognegro		nn	Feb 2018	10th Anniversary Edition; Graphic novel Originally published by DC Comics; Berger Books imprint
Incognegro: Renaissance		#1–5	Feb – Jun 2018	Berger Books imprint
The Incredibles		#1–4	Nov 2004 – Feb 2005	Adaptation of the movie
Indiana Jones Adventures		Vol. 1–2	Jun 1998 – Sep 2009	Graphic novels Dark Horse Books imprint
Indiana Jones and the Arms of Gold		#1–4	Feb – May 1994	
Indiana Jones and the Fate of Atlantis		#1–4	Mar – Sep 1991	
Indiana Jones and the Golden Fleece		#1–2	Jun – Jul 1994	
Indiana Jones and the Iron Phoenix		#1–4	Dec 1994 – Mar 1995	
Indiana Jones and the Kingdom of the Crystal Skull		#1–2	May 2008	Both issues have same date
Indiana Jones and the Sargasso Pirates		#1–4	Dec 1995 – Mar 1996	
Indiana Jones and the Shrine of the Sea Devil		#1	Sep 1994	
Indiana Jones and the Spear of Destiny		#1–4	Apr – Jul 1995	
Indiana Jones and the Tomb of the Gods		#1–4	Jun 2008 – Mar 2009	
Indiana Jones: Thunder in the Orient		#1–6	Sep 1993 – Apr 1994	
Instant Piano		#1–4	Aug 1994 – Feb 1995	
Invisible Kingdom		#1–10	Mar 2019 – Feb 2020	

== J ==
Title	Series	Issues	Dates	Notes
James Bond 007: A Silent Armageddon		#1–2	1993	Planned as four-issue series Ian Fleming's James Bond 007 on cover
James Bond 007: Serpent's Tooth		#1–3	Jul 1992 – Feb 1993	Ian Fleming's James Bond 007 on cover
James Bond 007: Shattered Helix		#1–2	Jun – Jul 1994	
James Bond 007: The Quasimodo Gambit		#1–3	Jan – May 1995	Ian Fleming's James Bond 007 on cover
Jingle Belle		#1–4	Nov 2004 – Apr 2005	Paul Dini's Jingle Belle on cover
Jingle Belle: The Fight Before Christmas		nn	Dec 2005	Paul Dini's Jingle Belle on cover
John Byrne's 2112		nn	Nov 1991	
John Byrne's Next Men		#0–30	Jan 1992 – Dec 1994	#0 published February 1992 #19–22 subtitled Faith, #23–26 subtitled Power, #27–30 subtitled Lies #19–30 published under Legend imprint
John Carpenter's Toxic Commando: Rise of the Sludge God		#1–3	Mar – May 2024	
Judge Dredd vs. Aliens		#1–4	Mar – Jun 2003	

== K ==
Title	Series	Issues	Dates	Notes
Karas		nn	Nov 2004	One-shot giveaway
Kickback		nn	Aug 2006	Hardcover graphic novel Dark Horse Books imprint
King Kong: The 8th Wonder of the World		#1	Dec 2005	Planned as three-issue series; #2–3 only published as part of collected trade paperback Adaptation of the 2005 movie
King Tiger		#1–4	Aug – Nov 2015	Collected in King Tiger: Son of the Dragon
King Tiger & Motorhead		#1–2	Aug – Sep 1996	
Kingdom of the Wicked		nn	Dec 2004	Hardcover graphic novel
Kings of the Night		#1–2	May – Jun 1989	
Kiss		#1–13	Jun 2002 – Sep 2003	
Kull		#1–6	Nov 2008 – May 2009	

== L ==
Title	Series	Issues	Dates	Notes
LaGuardia		#1–4	Dec 2018 – Mar 2019	
Last Man Standing: Killbook of a Bounty Hunter		nn	Nov 2013	Graphic novel
The Last of Us: American Dreams		#1–4	Apr – Jul 2013	
Last Train to Deadsville: A Cal McDonald Mystery		#1–4 (#7–10)	May – Sep 2004	#3 is first issue also numbered as part of overall Criminal Macabre series (#9)
The Legend of Korra: Turf Wars		#1–3	Jul 2017 – Jun 2018	
Legend of Mother Sarah		#1–8	Apr – Nov 1995	Dark Horse Comics Manga imprint Studio Proteus translation
The Legend of Mother Sarah: City of the Angels		#1–9	Oct 1996 – Jul 1998	#1 had second printing in December 1997; Dark Horse Comics Manga imprint Studio Proteus translation
The Legend of Mother Sarah: City of the Children		#1–7	Jan – Jul 1996	
Let Me In: Crossroads		#1–4	Dec 2010 – Mar 2011	Film prequel Hammer imprint Collected in Let Me In: Crossroads trade paperback
Living with the Dead		#1–3	Oct – Nov 2007	#2 and #3 both dated November 2007
Lobo/The Mask		#1–2		Copublished with DC Comics
Lobster Johnson: The Iron Prometheus		#1–5	Sep 2007 – Jan 2008	
Lone		#1–6	Sep 2003 – Mar 2004	Rocket Comics imprint #5 and #6 both dated March 2004
The Lone Gunmen		#1	Jun 2001	The Lone Gunmen Special on cover
Lone Wolf 2100		#1–11	May 2002 – Dec 2003	
Lone Wolf 2100: The Red File		nn	Jan 2003	
Lords of Misrule		#1–6	Jan – Jun 1997	
Lost in Space		#1–3	Apr – Jul 1998	
Love Me Tenderloin: A Cal McDonald Mystery		nn (#6)	Jan 2004	

== M ==
Title	Series	Issues	Dates	Notes
The Machine		#1–4	Nov 1994 – Feb 1995	Series put on hiatus due to low sales, never resumed Comics' Greatest World imprint
Madman Comics		#1–20	Apr 1994 – Dec 2000	#17–20 subtitled Madman Comics: The G-Men from Hell #1–4; Legend imprint #2–11; Dark Horse Maverick imprint #17–20
Madman/The Jam		#1–2	Jul – Aug 1998	
Magic: The Gathering: Gerrard's Quest		#1–4	Mar – Sep 1998	
Manga Darkchylde		#1–2	Feb – Mar 2005	Planned as five-issue series, cancelled after #2
Manga Darkchylde Zero		nn	Jul 2004	2004 San Diego Comicon exclusive Copublished with Darkchylde Entertainment
Man with the Screaming Brain		#1–4	Apr – Jul 2005	Based on the movie
The Mark		#1–4	Dec 1993 – Mar 1994	
Marshal Law: Secret Tribunal		#1–2		
Marshal Law: Super Babylon		nn	May 1992	
Martha Washington Dies		nn	Jul 2007	
Martha Washington: Stranded in Space		nn	Nov 1995	Legend imprint
Maskerade		#1–8	September 2022 – Present	Secret Stash Press imprint
The Mask	1	#1–4	Aug – Oct 1991	Collected in The Mask Omnibus Volume 1
The Mask	2	#1–17	Feb 1995 – Jul 1998	Ongoing series consisting of subtitled miniseries #1–5 The Mask Strikes Back #1–4 #6–9 Hunt for Green October #1–4 #10–13 World Tour #1–4 #14–17 Southern Discomfort #1–4; Dark Horse Heroes imprint #7–13; Collected in The Mask Omnibus Volumes 1 (#1–5) and 2 (#6–17)
The Mask/Marshal Law		#1–2	Feb – Mar 1998	
The Mask Returns		#1–4	Oct 1992 – Mar 1993	Collected in The Mask Omnibus Volume 2
The Mask: Toys in the Attic		#1–4	Aug – Nov 1998	Collected in The Mask Omnibus Volume 2
The Mask: Virtual Surreality		nn	Jul 1997	
The Massive		#1–30	Jun 2012 – Dec 2014	
Mata Hari		#1–5	Feb – Sep 2018	Berger Books imprint
Mayhem		#1–4	May – Sep 1989	
Mecha Special		#1	May 1995	Dark Horse Heroes imprint
Medal of Honor		#1–4	Oct 1994 – Jan 1995	
Mezz: Galactic Tour 2494		nn	May 1994	
Michael Chabon Presents The Amazing Adventures of The Escapist		#1–8	Feb 1994 – Nov 2005	#9 solicited but never published
The Milkman Murders		#1–4	Jun – Oct 2004	
MIND MGMT		#0–36	May 2012 – May 2015	
Monkeyman & O'Brien		#1–3	Jul – Sep 1996	Legend imprint
Monkeyman and O'Brien Special		nn	Feb 1996	Legend imprint
The Moth		#1–4	Apr – Jul 2004	Rocket Comics imprint Steve Rude's The Moth on cover
The Moth – Special		nn	Mar 2004	Rocket Comics imprint
Motorhead		#1–6	Aug 1995 – Jan 1996	Dark Horse Heroes imprint
Motorhead Special		#1	Mar 1994	Comics' Greatest World imprint
My Name Is Bruce		nn	Sep 2008	Movie adaptation
Myst		#0	Aug 1997	American Entertainment Exclusive free preview
Myst: The Book of the Black Ships		#1	Aug 1997	Planned as four-issue series, cancelled after #1
Mystery Men Movie Adaptation		#1–2	Jul – Aug 1999	
Mystery Science Theater 3000		#1–6	Sep 2018 – Mar 2019	Six-issue miniseries

== N ==
Title	Series	Issues	Dates	Notes
The Nail		#1–4	Jun – Oct 2004	
Neil Gaiman's Murder Mysteries		nn	Jun 2002	Graphic novel Dark Horse Maverick imprint
Neil Gaiman's Murder Mysteries		nn	May 2014	Second edition Dark Horse Books imprint
The Nevermen		#1–4	May – Aug 2000	
The Nevermen: Streets of Blood		#1–3	Jan – Apr 2003	
The New Two-Fisted Tales		nn	1993	Harvey Kurtzman's New Two-Fisted Tales on cover Copublished with Byron Preiss Publications, Inc
The New Two-Fisted Tales		nn	1994	Harvey Kurtzman's New Two-Fisted Tales on cover Copublished with Byron Preiss Publications, Inc
Nexus	2	#89–102	Jun 1996 – Oct 2009	Numbering continued from First Comics series, with #81–88 retroactively applied to intervening one-shot and limited series Subtitled as miniseries: #89–92 Nexus: The Executioner's Song #1–4 (Jun – Sep 1996); #93–94 Nexus: God Con #1–2 (both Apr 1997); #95–98 Nexus: Nightmare in Blue #1–4 (Jul – Oct 1997); #99–102 Nexus: Space Opera #1–4 (Jul 2007 – Jun 2009)
Nexus: Alien Justice		#1–3	Dec 1992 – Feb 1993	Retroactively numbered #82–84 of Volume 2
Nexus Meets Madman		nn	May 1996	Nexus Meets Madman Special on cover
Nexus the Liberator		#1–4	Aug – Nov 1992	Not included in numbering of Volume 2
Nexus: The Origin		nn	Jul 1992	Retroactively numbered #81 of Volume 2
Nexus: The Wages of Sin		#1–4	Mar – Jun 1995	Retroactively numbered #85–88 of Volume 2
Nickelodeon Avatar: The Last Airbender		nn	May 2011	Free Comic Book Day giveaways Also includes Star Wars: The Clone Wars story
Nickelodeon Avatar: The Last Airbender		nn	May 2013	Also includes Star Wars and Captain Midnight stories
Nickelodeon Avatar: The Last Airbender		nn	May 2014	Also includes Itty Bitty Hellboy and Juice Squeezers stories
Nickelodeon Avatar: The Last Airbender		nn	May 2015	Also includes Plants vs. Zombies and Bandette stories
Nickelodeon Avatar: The Last Airbender – The Art of the Animated Series		nn	May 2010	Hardcover art book
Nickelodeon Avatar: The Last Airbender – The Poster Collection		nn	Aug 2015	Poster book reprinting covers of twenty issues
Nickelodeon Avatar: The Last Airbender – The Promise		#1–3	Jan 2012 – Sep 2012	Trade-paperback limited series
Nickelodeon Avatar: The Last Airbender – The Rift		#1–3	Mar 2014 – Nov 2014	Trade-paperback limited series
Nickelodeon Avatar: The Last Airbender – The Rift		nn	Jul 2014	#1 for $1 edition
Nickelodeon Avatar: The Last Airbender – The Search		#1–3	Mar 2013 – Oct 2013	Trade-paperback limited series
Nickelodeon Avatar: The Last Airbender – Smoke and Shadow		#1–3	Sep 2015 – Mar 2016	Trade-paperback limited series
Ninja Gaiden '88		TBA	2024	Limited series and the continuation of the classic Ninja Gaiden series.
The Nocturnals: Witching Hour		nn	May 1998	

== O ==
Title	Series	Issues	Dates	Notes
The Occultist	OS	nn	Dec 2010	Collected in The Occultist trade paperback Collected in The Occultist Omnibus
The Occultist	1	#1–3	Nov 2011 – Jan 2012	Collected in The Occultist trade paperback Collected in The Occultist Omnibus
The Occultist	2	#1–5	Oct 2013 – Feb 2014	Project Black Sky imprint Collected in The Occultist Volume 2: At Death's Door; Collected in The Occultist Omnibus
The Oddly Pedestrian Life of Christopher Chaos		#1-	June 2023 – Present	Tiny Onion Studios imprint
Oh My Goddess!		#1–6	Aug 1994 – Jan 1995	Dark Horse Manga imprint Studio Proteus translation
Oh My Goddess!		#88–112	Jul 2002 – Sep 2004	Dark Horse Manga imprint Studio Proteus translation
Oh My Goddess! Part II		#1–8	Feb – Sep 1995	Dark Horse Manga imprint Studio Proteus translation
Oh My Goddess! Part III		#1–6	Apr – Sep 1996	Dark Horse Manga imprint Studio Proteus translation
Oh My Goddess! Part IV		#1–8	Dec 1996 – Jul 1997	Dark Horse Manga imprint Studio Proteus translation
Oh My Goddess! Part V		#1–12	Sep 1997 – Sep 1998	Dark Horse Manga imprint Studio Proteus translation
Oh My Goddess! Part VI		#1–6	Nov 1998 – Apr 1999	Dark Horse Manga imprint Studio Proteus translation
Oh My Goddess! Part VI		#1–8	May 5 – Dec 1999	Dark Horse Manga imprint Studio Proteus translation
Oh My Goddess! Part VIII		#1–7	Jan – Jul 2000	Dark Horse Manga imprint Studio Proteus translation
Oh My Goddess! Part IX		#1–7	Jul 2000 – Jan 2001	Dark Horse Manga imprint Studio Proteus translation
Oh My Goddess! Part X		#1–5	Feb – Sep 2001	Dark Horse Manga imprint Studio Proteus translation
Oh My Goddess! Part XI		#1–10	Nov 2000 – May 8, 2002	Dark Horse Manga imprint Studio Proteus translation
Oktane		#1–4	Aug – Nov 1995	
Oni		#1–3	Feb – Apr 2001	Based on the video game
Orion		#1–6	Sep 1992 – Jul 1993	Studio Proteus translation
Outer Orbit		#1–4	Dec 2006 – May 2007	
Outlanders	1	#1–33	Dec 1988 – Sep 1991	Studio Proteus translation
Outlanders	2	#0	Mar 1992	Studio Proteus translation
Outlanders Epilogue		nn	Mar 1994	Dark Horse Manga imprint Studio Proteus translation
Outlanders Special		#1	Mar 1993	Dark Horse Manga imprint Studio Proteus translation
Outlaw 7		#1–3	Aug 2001 – Jan 2002	Planned as four-issue series, cancelled after #3
Out of the Vortex		#1–12	Oct 1993 – Oct 1994	#1–4 titled Comics' Greatest World Out of the Vortex #1 has regular and limited editions Comics' Greatest World imprint

== P ==
Title	Series	Issues	Dates	Notes
Penny Arcade 1x25¢ Edition		nn	Dec 2005	
The Perhapanauts		#1–4	Nov 2005 – Feb 2006	
The Perhapanauts: Second Chances		#1–4	Oct 2006 – Jan 2007	
Pigeons from Hell		#1–4	Apr – Jul 2008	
Planet of the Apes		nn	May 2001	Adaptation of the 2001 movie
Planet of the Apes	1	#1–3	Jun – Aug 2001	Planet of the Apes: The Human War on cover
Planet of the Apes	2	#1–6	Sep 2001 – Feb 2002	
Polar		#1–4, 0	Nov 2013 – Mar 2019	Independent webcomic
Predator		#1–4	Jun 1989 – Mar 1990	Based on the movie
Predator: Bad Blood		#1–4	Dec 1993 – Jun 1994	
Predator: Big Game		#1–4	Mar – Jun 1991	
Predator Bloody Sands of Time		#1–2	Feb 1992	Both issues have same date
Predator: Captive		nn	Apr 1998	
Predator: Cold War		#1–4	Sep – Dec 1991	
Predator: Dark River		#1–4	Jul – Oct 1996	
Predator: Hell Come A-Walkin'		#1–2	Feb – Mar 1998	#1 Predator: Hell Come a Walkin' in indicia
Predator: Homeworld		#1–4	Mar – Jun 1999	
Predator: Invaders from the Fourth Dimension		nn	Aug 1994	
Predator: Kindred		#1–4	Dec 1996 – Mar 1997	
Predator: Nemesis		#1–2	Dec 1997	
Predator: Primal		#1–2	Jul – Aug 1997	
Predator: Race War		#1–4	Feb – Oct 1993	
Predator: Strange Roux		nn	Nov 1996	
Predator 2		#1–2	Feb – Jun 1991	Movie adaptation
Predator Versus Judge Dredd		#1–3	Oct – Dec 1997	Copublished with Egmont
Predator vs Judge Dredd vs Aliens		#1–4	Jul – Oct 2016	
Predator vs. Magnus Robot Fighter		#1–2	Nov 1992 – 1993	Copublished with Valiant Comics
Predator: Xenogensis		#1–4	Aug – Nov 1999	
Primal		#1–2	Oct – Dec 1992	
Primal: From the Cradle to the Grave		nn	1992	Graphic novel
Propellerman		#1–8	Jan 1993 – Mar 1994	
PROTOTykes Holiday Special/Hero Illustrated Holiday Special		#2	Dec 1994	Legend imprint
Pubo		#1–3	Nov 2002 – Mar 2003	

== Q ==
Title	Series	Issues	Dates	Notes
Quick Stops		#1–4	November 2022 – February 2023	Secret Stash Press imprint

== R ==
Title	Series	Issues	Dates	Notes
Randy Bowen's Decapitator		#1–4	Jun – Sep 1998	
Rascals in Paradise		#1–3	Aug – Dec 1994	
The Real Adventures of Jonny Quest		#1–12	Sep 1996 – Sep 1997	Jonny Quest: The Real Adventures on cover
Red Rocket 7		#1–7	Aug 1997 – Jun 1998	
Resident Alien	1	#0–3	Apr – Jul 2011	
Resident Alien: The Suicide Blonde	2	#0–3	Aug – Nov 2013	
Resident Alien: The Sam Hain Mystery	3	#0–3	Apr – Jul 2015	
Return of the Gremlins		#1–3	Mar – May 2008	
Revelations	1	#1	Mar 1995	One-shot minicomic No price on cover
Revelations	2	#1–6	Aug 2005 – Jan 2006	
Rex Mundi	2	#1–19	Aug 2006 – Aug 2009	Continued from Image Comics series
Ring of Roses		#1–4	Nov 1992 – Feb 1993	
The Ring of the Nibelung	1	#1–4	Feb – May 2000	Book One: The Rhinegold; Dark Horse Maverick imprint
The Ring of the Nibelung	2	#1–3	Aug – Oct 2000	Book Two: The Valkyrie; Dark Horse Maverick imprint
The Ring of the Nibelung	3	#1–3	Dec 2000 – Feb 2001	Book Three: The Siegfried; Dark Horse Maverick imprint
The Ring of the Nibelung	4	#1–4	Jun – Sep 2001	Book Four: Gotterdammerung The Twilight of the Gods; Dark Horse Maverick imprint
R.I.P.D.		#1–4	Oct 1999 – Jan 2000	
Ripley's Believe It or Not!		#1–3	May – Dec 2002	
Roachmill	2	#1–10	May 1988 – Dec 1990	Previously published by Blackthorne
RoboCop: Mortal Coils		#1–4	Sep – Dec 1993	
RoboCop: Prime Suspect		#1–4	Oct 1992 – Jan 1993	
RoboCop: Roulette		#1–4	Dec 1993 – Mar 1994	
RoboCop 3		#1–3	Jul – Nov 1993	Movie adaptation
RoboCop Versus The Terminator		#1–4	undated (Sep – Dec 1992)	
Rocket Comics: Ignite		#1	Apr 2003	Free Comic Book Day promo Rocket Comics imprint
The Rocketeer Adventure Magazine		#3	Jan 1995	Completes series begun by Comico

== S ==
Title	Series	Issues	Dates	Notes
Samurai: Heaven & Earth		#1–5	Dec 2004 – Dec 2005	Samurai: Heaven and Earth on cover
Samurai: Heaven & Earth Volume II		#1–5	Nov 2006 – Jun 2007	Samurai: Heaven and Earth Volume 2 on cover
San Diego Comic-Con Comics		#1–4	Aug 1992 – Jul 1995	Yearly one-shots
Satan's Sodomy Baby		nn	Apr 2007	
Satsuma Gishiden		nn	Sep 2006	Graphic novel Published in association with Leed Publishing; Dark Horse Manga imprint
Scarlet Traces: The Great Game		#1–4	Jul – Oct 2006	
Scatterbrain		#1–4	Jun – Sep 1998	Comics anthology
The Scorpion King		#1–2	Mar – Apr 2002	
The Scream		#1–4	Nov 2007 – Feb 2008	
A Second Chance at Sarah		#1	Feb 2010	
The Secret		#1–4	Feb – May 2007	Later converted to a Motion comic
Secret Files of Project Black Sky		#1–5	May – Sep 2014	webcomic Project Black Sky imprint Collected in Project Black Sky: Secret Files
The Seeds				
Serenity		#1–3	Jul – Sep 2005	
Serenity: Better Days		#1–3	Mar – May 2008	
Sergio Aragonés' Actions Speak		#1–6	Jan – Jun 2001	Dark Horse Maverick imprint
Sergio Aragonés' Blair Which?		nn	Dec 1999	
Sergio Aragonés' Boogeyman		#1–4	Jun – Sep 1998	
Sergio Aragonés' Día de Los Muertos		nn	Oct 1998	
Sergio Aragonés' Groo	4	#1–4	Jan – Apr 1998	Previously published by Pacific Comics, Epic Comics, and Image Comics
Sergio Aragonés' Groo and Rufferto		#1–4	Dec 1998 – Mar 1999	Sergio Aragonés' Groo & Rufferto on cover
Sergio Aragonés' Groo: Death & Taxes		#1–4	Dec 2001 – Apr 2002	Dark Horse Maverick imprint
Sergio Aragonés Groo: Hell on Earth		#1–4	Nov 2007 – Apr 2008	
Sergio Aragonés' Groo: Mightier than the Sword		#1–4	Jan – Apr 2000	Dark Horse Maverick imprint
Sergio Aragonés Groo: 25th Anniversary Special		nn	Aug 2007	
Sergio Aragonés' Louder Than Words		#1–6	Jul – Dec 1997	
Sergio Aragonés Stomps Star Wars		nn	Jan 2000	
The Shadow		#1–2	Jun – Jul 1994	Adaptation of the movie
The Shadow and Doc Savage		#1–2	Jul – Aug 1995	
The Shadow and the Mysterious 3		#1	Sep 1994	
The Shadow: In the Coils of the Leviathan		#1–4	Oct 1993 – Apr 1994	
Shadow Empires: Faith Conquers		#1–4	Aug – Nov 1994	
Shadow Lady		#1–24	Apr 1998 – Sep 2000	Dark Horse Manga imprint Numbered on covers as miniseries: #1–7 Shadow Lady: Dangerous Love #1–7; #8–12 Shadow Lady: The Eyes of a Stranger #1–5; #13–19 Shadow Lady: The Awakening #1–7; #20–24 Shadow Lady: Sudden Death #1–5
Shadow Lady Special		nn	Oct 2000	Dark Horse Manga imprint
Shi: Ju-Nen		#1–4	Jul 2004 – May 2005	
Shinobi		#1	Aug 2002	
Shrek		#1–3	Sep – Dec 2003	
Silke		#1–4	Jan – Sep 2001	Sporadic after #2
Sin City: A Dame to Kill For		#1–6	Nov 1993 – May 1994	Legend imprint
Sin City: Family Values		nn	Oct 1997	Softcover graphic novel
Sin City: Family Values		nn	Dec 1998	Hardcover
Sin City: Hell and Back		#1–9	Jul 1999 – Apr 2000	Dark Horse Maverick imprint
Sin City: Just Another Saturday Night		#½	Oct 1997	Wizard Magazine premium Sin City #½: Just Another Saturday Night in indicia
Sin City: Just Another Saturday Night		nn	Oct 1998	
Sin City: Lost, Lonely, & Lethal		nn	Dec 1996	Legend imprint
Sin City: Sex & Violence		nn	Mar 1997	Legend imprint
Sin City: Silent Night		nn	Nov 1995	Legend imprint
Sin City: That Yellow Bastard		#1–6	Feb – Jul 1996	Legend imprint
Sin City: The Babe Wore Red and Other Stories		nn	Nov 1994	Legend imprint
Sin City: The Big Fat Kill		#1–5	Nov 1994 – Mar 1995	Legend imprint
Skyman	1	#1–4	Jan – Apr 2014	Project Black Sky imprint Collected in Skyman Volume 1: The Right Stuff
Skyman	OS	nn	Nov 2014	Project Black Sky imprint
Sock Monkey	1	#1–2	Sep – Oct 1998	Later miniseries titled Tony Millionaire's Sock Monkey
Sock Monkey: The Inches Incident		#1–4	Sep 2006 – Apr 2007	Sock Monkey: The "Inches" Incident on cover
Solomon Kane		#1–5	Sep 2008 – Feb 2009	
Space Circus		#1–4	Jul – Oct 2000	Dark Horse Maverick imprint
Spacehawk		#1–5	1989 – Jan 1993	
Space Usagi	3	#1–3	Jan – Mar 1996	First two series published by Mirage Studios
Speak of the Devil		#1–6	Jul 2007 – May 2008	
Species		#1–4	Jun – Sep 1995	Movie adaptation
Species: Human Race		#1–4	Nov 1996 – Feb 1997	
Spirit of Wonder		#1–5	Apr – Aug 1996	Dark Horse Manga imprint Studio Proteus translation
SpyBoy		#1–12 #14–17	Oct 1999 – May 2001	
SpyBoy		#13.1–13.3	Apr – Aug 2003	SpyBoy: The M.A.N.G.A. Affair on cover
SpyBoy: Final Exam		#1–4	May – Aug 2004	Rocket Comics imprint
SpyBoy/Young Justice		#1–3	Feb – Apr 2002	Copublished with DC Comics
SpyBoy Special		#1	May 2002	
Star Slammers Special		nn	Jun 1996	Legend imprint
Star Wars	2	#1–10	Oct 1992 – Jul 1993	Reprints in magazine format Dark Horse International imprint
Star Wars	3	#1–45	Dec 1998 – Aug 2002	Title changed to Star Wars: Republic when Star Wars: Empire launched Most issues are subtitled on cover as miniseries: Prelude to Rebellion (1–6); Outlander (7–12); Emissaries to Malastare (13–18); Twilight (19–22); Infinity's End (23–26); Starcrash (27); The Hunt for Aurra Sing (28–31); Darkness (32–35); The Stark Hyperspace War (36–39); The Devaronian Version (40–41); Rite of Passage (42–45)
Star Wars	OS	#0	Jun 1999	Star Wars #0 AnotherUniverse.com Special Edition in indicia Reprints serial originally published in Marvel Comics' Pizzazz in 1978
Star Wars	4	#1–20	Jan 2013 – Aug 2014	
The Star Wars		#1–8	Sep 2018 – May 2014	
Star Wars: A New Hope — The Special Edition		#1–4	Jan – Apr 1997	Limited-series movie adaptation
Star Wars: A Valentine Story		nn	Feb 2003	
Star Wars Adventures		#1–6	Apr 2009 – Sep 2011	
Star Wars: Boba Fett		#1–3	Dec 1995 – Aug 1997	Series of numbered one-shots; second and third issues are subtitled in indicia: Star Wars: Boba Fett #2 – When the Fat Lady Sings; Star Wars: Boba Fett #3 – Murder Most Foul
Star Wars: Boba Fett		#½	Dec 1997	Wizard premium
Star Wars: Boba Fett — Agent of Doom		nn	Nov 2000	
Star Wars: Boba Fett — Enemy of the Empire		#1–4	Jan – Apr 1999	#2 Star Wars: Boba Fett: Enemy of the Empire in indicia
Star Wars: Boba Fett — Overkill		nn	Mar 2006	
Star Wars: Boba Fett — Twin Engines of Destruction		nn	Jan 1997	
Star Wars: Chewbacca		#1–4	Jan – Apr 2000	
Star Wars: Clone Wars Adventures		Vol. 1–10	Jul 2004 – Dec 2007	Original trade paperbacks
Star Wars: Crimson Empire		#1–6	Dec 1997 – May 1998	
Star Wars Crimson Empire II: Council of Blood		#1–6	Nov 1998 – Apr 1999	
Star Wars: Dark Empire		#1–6	Dec 1991 – Oct 1992	
Star Wars: Dark Empire II		#1–6	Dec 1994 – May 1995	
Star Wars: Dark Empire – Preview		nn	Mar 1996	99¢ issue
Star Wars: Dark Force Rising		#1–6	May – Oct 1997	Based on the novel
Star Wars: Dark Forces – Soldier for the Empire		nn	Apr 2007	Graphic novel Copublished with G. P. Putnam's Sons under their Boulevard/Putnam imprint
Star Wars: Dark Times		#0–17 (#84–100)	Oct 2006 – Jun 2010	Numbering continues from Star Wars: Republic
Star Wars: Darth Maul		#1–4	Sep – Dec 2000	
Star Wars: Droids	1	#1–6	Apr – Sep 1994	
Star Wars: Droids	2	#1–8	Apr – Dec 1995	
Star Wars: Droids Special		#1	Jan 1995	
Star Wars: Empire		#1–40	Sep 2002 – Feb 2006	Numbering continues with Star Wars: Rebellion #2
Star Wars: Empire's End		#1–2	Oct – Nov 1995	
Star Wars: Episode I Anakin Skywalker		nn	May 1999	
Star Wars: Episode I Obi-Wan Kenobi		nn	May 1999	
Star Wars: Episode I Queen Amidala		nn	May 1999	
Star Wars: Episode I Qui-Gon Jinn		nn	May 1999	
Star Wars: Episode I The Phantom Menace		#½	May 1999	Wizard Magazine premium
Star Wars: Episode I The Phantom Menace		#1–4	May 1999 (all issues)	Limited-series movie adaptation
Star Wars: Episode II – Attack of the Clones		#1–4	Apr – May 2002	Limited-series movie adaptation First two issues dated April 2002, third and fourth May 2002
Star Wars: Episode III – Revenge of the Sith		#1–4	May 2005 (all issues)	Limited-series movie adaptation
Star Wars – Free Comic Book Day 2005 Special		nn	May 2005	
Star Wars – Free Comic Book Day 2006 Special		nn	May 2006	Flipbook with Conan – Free Comic Book Day 2006 Special
Star Wars: General Grievous		#1–4	Mar – Jun 2005	
Star Wars Handbook		nn	Jul 1998	Official title Star Wars Handbook: X-Wing Rogue Squadron
Star Wars Handbook		#2	Jul 1999	Star Wars Handbook #2: Crimson Empire in indicia
Star Wars Handbook		#3	Mar 2000	Star Wars Handbook #3: Dark Empire in indicia
Star Wars Hasbro/Toys "R" Us Exclusive		#1–4	May 2002 (all issues)	Promotional issues
Star Wars: Heir to the Empire		#1–6	Oct 1995 – Apr 1996	Based on the novel
Star Wars: Infinities – A New Hope		#1–4	May – Oct 2001	
Star Wars: Infinities – Return of the Jedi		#1–4	Nov 2003 – Mar 2004	#1 unnumbered in indicia, numbered on cover
Star Wars: Infinities – The Empire Strikes Back		#1–4	Jul – Oct 2002	
Star Wars: Invasion – Refugees		#0–5	Jul – Nov 2009	
Star Wars: Invasion Rescues		#1–6	May – Dec 2010	
Star Wars: Jabba the Hut		#1	Apr 1995	Star Wars: Jabba the Hut – The Gaar Suppoon Hit on cover
Star Wars: Jabba the Hut – Betrayal		nn	Feb 1996	
Star Wars: Jabba the Hut – The Dynasty Trap		nn	Aug 1995	
Star Wars: Jabba the Hut – The Hunger of Princess Nampi		nn	Jun 1995	
Star Wars: Jango Fett		nn	Jan 2002	Graphic novel
Star Wars: Jango Fett – Open Seasons		#1–4	Apr – Jul 2002	
Star Wars: Jedi – Aayla Secura		nn	Aug 2003	
Star Wars: Jedi Academy – Leviathan		#1–4	Oct 1998 – Jan 1999	
Star Wars: Jedi Council: Acts of War		#1–4	Jun – Sep 2000	
Star Wars: Jedi – Count Dooku		nn	Nov 2003	
Star Wars: Jedi – Mace Windu		nn	Feb 2003	
Star Wars: Jedi Quest		#1–4	Sep – Dec 2001	
Star Wars: Jedi – Shaak Ti		nn	May 2003	
Star Wars: Jedi vs. Sith		#1–6	Apr – Sep 2001	
Star Wars: Jedi – Yoda		nn	Jun 2004	
Star Wars: Knight Errant		#1–15	Oct 2010 – Oct 2012	
Star Wars: Knights of the Old Republic		#1–50	Jan 2006 – Feb 2010	Star Wars: Knights of the Old Republic #28–50
Star Wars: Knights of the Old Republic Handbook		#1	Nov 2007	
Star Wars: Knights of the Old Republic/Rebellion		#0	Mar 2006	25¢ one-shot flipbook
Star Wars: Legacy		#0–50	Jun 2006 – Aug 2010	
Star Wars: Legacy		#0½	Jan 2008	
Star Wars: Mara Jade		#1–6	Aug 1998 – Jan 1999	Star Wars: Mara Jada – By the Emperor's Hand on cover
Star Wars: Obsession		#1–5	Nov 2004 – Apr 2005	
Star Wars: Panel to Panel		nn	Sep 2004	Trade-paperback art book
Star Wars: Purge		nn	Dec 2005	
Star Wars: Qui-Gon & Obi-Wan – Last Stand on Ord Mantell		#1–3	Dec 2000 – Mar 2001	
Star Wars: Qui-Gon & Obi-Wan – The Aurorient Express		#1–2	Feb – May 2002	
Star Wars: Rebellion		#1–16 (#41–56)	Apr 2006 – Aug 2008	Subnumbering continues from Star Wars: Empire
Star Wars: Republic		#46–83	Sep 2002 – Feb 2006	Title changed from Star Wars; Numbering continues with Star Wars: Dark Times
Star Wars: River of Chaos		#1–4	Jun – Nov 1995	
Star Wars: Shadows of the Empire		#1–6	May – Oct 1996	
Star Wars: Shadows of the Empire		nn	May 1996	Kenner premium
Star Wars: Shadows of the Empire – Evolution		#1–5	Feb – Jun 1998	
Star Wars: Shadow Stalker		nn	Sep 1997	
Star Wars: Splinter of the Mind's Eye		#1–4	Dec 1995 – Jun 1996	Based on the novel
Star Wars: Starfighter – Crossbones		#1–3	Jan – Mar 2002	Based on the video game
Star Wars: Tag & Bink Are Dead		#1–2	Oct – Nov 2001	
Star Wars: Tag & Bink II		#1–2	Mar – Apr 2006	#1 Star Wars: The Return of Tag & Bink Special Edition on cover #2 Star Wars: Tag & Bink – Episode I: Revenge of the Clone Menace on cover
Star Wars Tales		#1–24	Sep 1999 – Jul 2005	Quarterly anthology series of original trade paperbacks
Star Wars Tales – A Jedi's Weapon		nn	May 2002	Free Comic Book Day promo
Star Wars: Tales from Mos Eisley		nn	Mar 1996	
Star Wars: Tales of the Jedi		#1–5	Oct 1993 – Feb 1994	
Star Wars: Tales of the Jedi – Dark Lords of the Sith, Book One		#1–6	Oct 1994 – Mar 1995	
Star Wars: Tales of the Jedi – Redemption		#1–5	Jul – Nov 1998	
Star Wars: Tales of the Jedi – The Fall of the Sith Empire		#1–5	Jun – Oct 1997	
Star Wars: Tales of the Jedi – The Freedon Nadd Uprising		#1–2	Aug – Sep 1994	
Star Wars: Tales of the Jedi – The Golden Age of the Sith		#0	Feb 1997	
Star Wars: Tales of the Jedi – The Golden Age of the Sith		#1–5	Oct 1996 – Feb 1997	
Star Wars: Tales of the Jedi – The Sith War		#1–6	Aug 1995 – Jan 1996	
Star Wars: The Bounty Hunters – Aurra Sing		nn	Jul 1999	
Star Wars: The Bounty Hunters – Kenix Kil		nn	Oct 1999	
Star Wars: The Bounty Hunters – Scoundrel's Wages		nn	Aug 1999	
Star Wars: The Clone Wars		#1–12	Sep 2008 – Jan 2010	Tie-in to movie/television show of the same name
Star Wars: The Clone Wars		#1–4	Sep 2008 – Dec 2009	
Star Wars: The Clone Wars – Shipyards of Doom		nn	Sep 2008	Graphic novel
Star Wars: The Force Unleashed		nn	Aug 2008	Graphic novel
Star Wars: The Jabba Tape		nn	Dec 1998	
Star Wars: The Last Command		#1–6	Nov 1997 – Jul 1998	Based on the novel
Star Wars: The Protocol Offensive		nn	Sep 1997	
Star Wars: Underworld – The Yavin Vassilika		#1–5	Dec 2000 – Jun 2001	
Star Wars: Union		#1–4	Nov 1999 – Feb 2000	
Star Wars: Vader's Quest		#1–4	Feb – May 1999	
Star Wars Visionaries		nn	Apr 2005	Graphic novel
Star Wars: X-Wing Rogue Squadron		#1–35	Jul 1995 – Nov 1998	First twenty issues titled on cover as series of limited series, later issues note overall issue number as well as subtitle: #1–4 Star Wars: X-Wing Squadron – The Rebel Opposition #1–4; #5–8 Star Wars: X-Wing Squadron – The Phantom Affair #1–4; #9–12 Star Wars: X-Wing Squadron – Battleground: Tatooine #1–4; #13–16 Star Wars: X-Wing Squadron – The Warrior Princess #1–4; #17–20 Star Wars: X-Wing Squadron – Requiem for a Rogue #1–4; #21–24 Star Wars: X-Wing Squadron – In the Empire's Service #1–4; #25 Star Wars: X-Wing Squadron – The Making of Baron Fel; #26–27 Star Wars: X-Wing Squadron – Family Ties #1–2; #28–31 Star Wars: X-Wing Squadron – Masquerade #1–4; #32–35 Star Wars: X-Wing Squadron – Mandatory Retirement #1–4
Star Wars X-Wing Rogue Squadron: Rogue Leader		#1–3	Sep – Nov 2005	
Star Wars: Zam Wesell		nn	Mar 2002	Graphic novel
Starship Troopers		#1–2	undated (Oct – Nov 1997)	Adaptation of movie
Starship Troopers: Brute Creations		nn	undated (Sep 1997)	
Starship Troopers: Dominant Species		#1–4	Aug – Nov 1998	
Starship Troopers: Insect Touch		#1–3	undated (May – Aug 1997)	
The Strain		#1–12	Dec 2011 – Feb 2013	#1–6 based on the novel
The Strain: The Fall		#1–9	Jul 2013 – Mar 2014	#1–4 based on the novel
The Strain: The Night Eternal		#1–12	Aug 2014 – Jul 2015	#1–6 Based on the novel
SubHuman		#1–4	Nov 1998 – Feb 1999	"A Stormforce 10 Adventure"
Superman/Aliens		#1–3	Jul – Sep 1995	Copublished with DC Comics
Superman/Aliens 2: God War		#1–3	May – Sep 2002	Copublished with DC Comics
Superman and Batman vs. Aliens and Predator		#1–2	undated (Jan – Feb 2007)	Copublished with DC Comics
The Superman/Madman Hullabaloo!		#1–3	Jun – Aug 1997	Copublished with DC Comics
Superman/Tarzan: Sons of the Jungle		#1–3	Oct 2001 – May 2002	Copublished with DC Comics
Superman vs. Predator		#1–4	undated (May – Jul 2000)	
Superman vs. The Terminator: Death to the Future		#1–4	Dec 1999 – Mar 2000	
Syn		#1–5	Aug 2003 – Feb 2004	Rocket Comics imprint

== T ==
Title	Series	Issues	Dates	Notes
The Tale of One Bad Rat		#1–4	Oct 1994 – Jan 1995	
Tales of the Fear Agent: Twelve Steps in One		nn (#16)	Oct 2007	
Tales of the Vampires		#1–5	Dec 2003 – Apr 2004	First issue undated
Tales to Offend		#1	Jul 1997	
Tank Girl		#1–4	May – Aug 1991	
Tank Girl 2		#1–4	Jun – Sep 1993	
Tarzan		#1–20	Jul 1996 – Mar 1998	Edgar Rice Burroughs' Tarzan on cover #7–20 have subtitles on cover: Legion of Hate (7–10); Le Monstre (11–12); The Modern Prometheus (13–14); Tooth and Nail (15–16); vs. The Moon Men (17–20)
Tarzan/Carson of Venus		#1–4	May – Aug 1998	
Tarzan/John Carter: Warlords of Mars		#1–4	Jan – Jun 1996	
Tarzan the Savage Heart		#1–4	Apr – Jul 1999	
Tarzan vs. Predator at the Earth's Core		#1–4	Jan – Jun 1996	
The Tenth: Resurrected		#1–4	Jul 2001 – Jan 2002	
The Terminator	I	#1–4	Aug – Nov 1990	Based on the movie
The Terminator	2	#1–4	Aug – Dec 1998	#1 undated
The Terminator	3	nn	Aug 1998	The Terminator Special in title box on cover
The Terminator: Endgame		#1–3	Sep – Oct 1992	
The Terminator: Hunters and Killers		#1–3	Mar – May 1992	
The Terminator: One Shot		nn	Jul 1991	
The Terminator: Secondary Objectives		#1–4	Jul – Oct 1991	
The Terminator: The Dark Years		#1–4	Aug – Dec 1999	
The Terminator: The Enemy Within		#1–4	Nov 1991 – Feb 1992	
The Territory		#1–4	Jan – Apr 1999	
The Thing (From Another World)		#1–2	undated (Dec 1991 – Jan 1992)	Sequel to the movie
The Thing from Another World: Climate of Fear		#1–4	Jul – Dec 1992	
The Thing from Another World: Eternal Vows		#1–4	Dec 1993 – Mar 1994	
Thirteen O'Clock		nn	Dec 1992	A Mr. Murmur Adventure; Reprints stories from Deadline USA
Timecop		#1–2	Sep – Nov 1994	Based on the movie
Titan A.E.		#1–3	May – Jul 2000	Prequel to the movie
Titan Special		#1	Jun 1994	Comics' Greatest World imprint
Tongue*Lash		#1–2	Aug – Sep 1996	
Tongue*Lash II		#1–2	Feb – Mar 1999	
Tony Millionaire's Sock Monkey	Vol. 2	#1–2	Jul – Aug 1999	Volume 1 was titled Sock Monkey; Dark Horse Maverick imprint
Tony Millionaire's Sock Monkey	Vol. 3	#1–2	Nov – Dec 2000	Dark Horse Maverick imprint
Torch of Liberty Special		nn	Jan 1995	
Trekker		#1–6	May 1987 – Mar 1988	
Trekker Color Special		#1	undated (Jul 1989)	Undated
Trigun Anime Manga: Wolfwood		nn	undated (2003)	25¢ preview Dark Horse Manga imprint
The True Lives of the Fabulous Killjoys		#1–6	June 2013 – Jan 2014	
The True Lives of the Fabulous Killjoys: National Anthem		#1–6	Oct 2020 – Mar 2021	Sequel to The True Lives of the Fabulous Killjoys
The Truth		nn	Aug 1999	Copublished with Wieden+Kennedy Entertainment

== U ==
Title	Series	Issues	Dates	Notes
Ultraman Tiga		#1–10	Aug 2003 – Jun 2004	Translation of series published in Hong Kong by Jade Dynasty
The Umbrella Academy		#1	Sep 2010	#1 for $1 edition
The Umbrella Academy: Apocalypse Suite		#1–6	Sep 2007 – Feb 2008	
The Umbrella Academy: Dallas		#1–6	Nov 2008 – Apr 2009	
The Umbrella Academy: Hotel Oblivion		#1–7	Oct 2018 – Jun 2019	
Urban Legends		#1	Jun 1993	Planned as two-issue series, cancelled after #1
Usagi Yojimbo	3	#1–current	Apr 1996 – present	#30–62 Dark Horse Maverick imprint
Usagi Yojimbo Color Special (#4) – Green Persimmon		nn	Jul 1997	Three issues published by Fantagraphics

== V ==
Title	Series	Issues	Dates	Notes
Vandroid		#1–5	Feb – Jun 2014	
Van Helsing: From Beneath the Rue Morgue		nn	Apr 2004	Based on the movie
The Venus Wars		#1–14	Apr 1991 – May 1992	Studio Proteus translation
The Venus Wars II		#1–15	Jun 1992 – Aug 1993	Studio Proteus translation
Virus		#1–4	undated (Dec 1992 – Aug 1993)	

== W ==
Title	Series	Issues	Dates	Notes
Wacky Squirrel		#1–4	Oct 1987 – Oct 1988	
Walter		#1–4	Feb – May 1996	
Warrior of Waverly Street		#1–2	Nov – Dec 1996	
Who Wants to Be a Superhero? Free Comics Book Day Preview		nn	May 2007	
Will to Power		#1–12	Jun – Aug 1994	Weekly; Comics' Greatest World imprint Collected in Dark Horse Heroes Omnibus Volume 1
Witchblade/Aliens/The Darkness/Predator		#1–3	Nov 2000 – Feb 2001	
Wolf & Red		#1–3	Apr – Jun 1995	Tex Avery's Wolf & Red on cover
The World Below		#1–4	Mar – Jun 1999	Cancelled due to low sales
The World Below: Deeper and Stranger		#1–4	Dec 1999 – Mar 2000	Dark Horse Maverick imprint
Wyrd		#1–4	Jan – Sep 2019	

== X ==
Title	Series	Issues	Dates	Notes
X	1	#1–25	Feb 1994 – Apr 1996	#1 has regular and black-and-white editions #1–12 Comics' Greatest World imprint #13–25 Dark Horse Heroes imprint Collected in X Omnibus Volumes 1 (#1–11) and 2 (#12–25); Individual stories collected in Isolation and Illusion (#6) and Ghost Stories (#8)
X	2	#0–24	Apr 2013 – Apr 2015	Project Black Sky imprint #9–24; Collected in X Volumes 1–6 (#0–4; #5–8; #9–12; #13–16; #17–20; #21–24)
X: One Shot to the Head		nn	Aug 1994	Comics' Greatest World imprint Collected in X Omnibus Volume 1
X/Hero Illustrated Special		#1–2	Jun 1994	Comics' Greatest World imprint Both issues dated June; Collected in X Omnibus Volume 1
Xena: Warrior Princess		#1–14	Sep 1999 – Oct 2000	Based on the TV series
Xena: Warrior Princess – Blood and Shadows		nn	Jan 2001	Graphic novel
Xena: Warrior Princess – Slave		nn	Oct 2000	Graphic novel
Xena: Warrior Princess – The Warrior Way of Death		nn	Jun 2000	Graphic novel

== Y ==
Title	Series	Issues	Dates	Notes
You Deserved It		nn	Oct 2005	Graphic novel
You Look Like Death: Tales from the Umbrella Academy		#1–present	Sep 2020 –	
You're Under Arrest		#1–8	Dec 1995 – Jul 1996	
The Young Cynics' Club		nn	Mar 1993	
The Young Indiana Jones Chronicles		#1–12	Feb 1992 – Feb 1993	

== Z ==
Title	Series	Issues	Dates	Notes
Zero Killer		#1–6	Jul 2007 – Oct 2009	
ZombieWorld: Champion of the Worms		#1–3	Sep – Nov 1997	
ZombieWorld: Dead End		#1–2	Jan – Feb 1998	
ZombieWorld: Eat Your Heart Out		nn	Apr 1998	
ZombieWorld: Home for the Holidays		nn	Dec 1997	
ZombieWorld: Tree of Death		#1–4	Jun – Oct 1999	
ZombieWorld: Winter Dregs		#1–4	May – Aug 1998	
Zone		#1	undated (Apr 1990)	
