= List of Dark Horse Comics collected editions =

This is a list of collected editions of material published by Dark Horse Comics as ongoing and limited series. For collected editions reprinting webcomics and material originally published by other companies, including manga and manhwa series that were translated and distributed in America, see the List of Dark Horse Comics reprints.

== 0-9 ==
Title	Vol.	Vol. title	Material collected	Format	Pages	Publication date	ISBN	Notes
The 13th Son: Worse Thing Waiting			The 13th Son: Worse Thing Waiting #1–4	TP	96	September 2007	978-1593075514	
3 Story: The Secret History of the Giant Man			3 Story: The Secret History of the Giant Man; 3 Story: Secret Files of the Giant Man	TP	224	August 2018	978-1506706221	
300			300 #1–5	HC	88	December 1999	978-1569714027	
47 Ronin			47 Ronin #1–5	HC	144	March 2014	978-1595829542	
47 Ronin			47 Ronin #1–5	TP	152	January 2021	978-1506717999	

== A ==
Title	Vol.	Vol. title	Material collected	Format	Pages	Publication date	ISBN	Notes
Abe Sapien	1	The Drowning	Abe Sapien: The Drowning #1–5	TP	144	September 2008	978-1595821850	
Abe Sapien	2	The Devil Does Not Jest and Other Stories	Abe Sapien: The Haunted Boy; Abe Sapien: The Abyssal Plain #1–2; Abe Sapien: The Devil Does Not Jest #1–2	TP	144	April 2012	978-1595829252	
Abe Sapien	3	Dark and Terrible and The New Race of Man	Abe Sapien #1–5	TP	144	December 2013	978-1616552848	
Abe Sapien	4	The Shape of Things to Come	Abe Sapien #6–7, 9–11	TP	144	July 2014	978-1616554439	
Abe Sapien	5	Sacred Places	Abe Sapien #12–14, 16–17	TP	144	January 2015	978-1616555153	
Abe Sapien	6	A Darkness So Great	Abe Sapien #18–22	TP	144	July 2015	978-1616556563	
Abe Sapien	7	The Secret Fire	Abe Sapien #24–26, 28–29, 31	TP	160	June 2016	978-1616558918	
Abe Sapien	8	The Desolate Shore	Abe Sapien #32–36	TP	144	January 2017	978-1506700311	
Abe Sapien	9	Lost Lives and Other Stories	Abe Sapien #8, 15, 23, 27, 30; "Subconscious" from Dark Horse Presents (vol. 3) #11	TP	152	June 2017	978-1506702209	
Abe Sapien	Dark and Terrible Vol. 1		Abe Sapien #1–7, 9–14, 16–17	HC	408	November 2017	978-1506705385	
Abe Sapien	Dark and Terrible Vol. 2		Abe Sapien #18–22, 24–26, 28–29, 31–36	HC	408	March 2018	978-1506703855	
Abe Sapien	The Drowning and Other Stories		Abe Sapien: The Drowning #1–5; Abe Sapien: The Haunted Boy; Abe Sapien: The Abyssal Plain #1–2; Abe Sapien: The Devil Does Not Jest #1–2; Abe Sapien #8, 15, 23, 27, 30; "Subconscious" from Dark Horse Presents (vol. 3) #11	HC	448	July 2018	978-1506704883	
Adam.3: S.E.E.D.S.			Adam.3 #1–5	TP		December 2016	978-1616559250	
The Adventures of Blanche			Blanche Goes to New York; Blanche Goes to Hollywood; Blanche Goes to Paris	HC	104	March 2009	978-1595822581	
The Adventures of Luther Arkwright			The Adventures of Luther Arkwright #1–9	TP		July 1997	978-1569712559	
The Adventures of Luther Arkwright			The Adventures of Luther Arkwright #1–9	TP	216	May 2008	978-1593077259	Second edition.
The Adventures of Superhero Girl			The Adventures of Superhero Girl; two new stories	HC	128	June 2017	978-1506703367	
Adventures of the Mask Omnibus			The Mask: Official Movie Adaptation #1–2; Adventures of the Mask #1–12; The Mask: Virtual Surreality; "Angry Young Mask" from Dark Horse Presents Annual 1999; "No Mask Is an Island" from Dark Horse Presents #153; Adventures of the Mask Toys "R" Us Special Edition!	TP	392	July 2009	978-1593079383	
Æon Flux			Æon Flux #1–4	TP	96	May 2006	978-1593075286	
Age of Reptiles	Tribal Warfare		Age of Reptiles #1–4	TP		February 1996	978-1569711019	
Age of Reptiles	The Hunt		Age of Reptiles: The Hunt #1–5	TP		July 1997	978-1569711996	
Age of Reptiles	Ancient Egyptians		Age of Reptiles: Ancient Egyptians #1–4	TP	136	January 2016	978-1616558208	
Age of Reptiles Omnibus	1		Age of Reptiles #1–4; Age of Reptiles: The Hunt #1–5; Age of Reptiles: The Journey #1–4	TP	400	January 2011	978-1595826831	
Akaneiro			Akaneiro #1–3	HC	72	November 2013	978-1616551940	
Alabaster	Wolves		Alabaster: Wolves #1–5; "Shelter" from Free Comic Book Day: Star Wars / and Serenity: Firefly Class 03-K64; "Shelter Part Two" from Free Comic Book Day and Buffy the Vampire Slayer Season 9 / The Guild: Beach'd	HC	136	February 2013	978-1616550257	
Alabaster	Grimmer Tales		"Boxcar Tales" from Dark Horse Presents (vol. 2) #18–22, 24, 26–32	HC	120	April 2014	978-1616553029	
Alabaster	The Good, the Bad, and the Bird		Alabaster: The Good, the Bad, and the Bird #1–5	HC	128	August 2016	978-1616557966	
Aleister & Adolf			Aleister & Adolf	TP	104	December 2020	978-1506721040	
Alien vs. Predator	Fire and Stone		Alien vs. Predator: Fire and Stone #1–4	TP	104	June 2015	978-1616556914	
Alien vs. Predator	Life and Death		Alien vs. Predator: Life and Death #1–4; Prometheus: Life and Death – Final Conflict	TP	136	August 2017	978-1506701691	
Alien vs. Predator	Thicker than Blood		Alien vs. Predator: Thicker than Blood #1–4	TP	96	November 2020	978-1506716145	
Alien: The Original Screenplay			Alien: The Original Screenplay #1–5	HC	112	December 2020	978-1506717661	
Aliens	Book One		Aliens (vol. 1) #1–6; "Theory of Alien Propagation" from Dark Horse Presents (vol. 1) #24	TP		November 1989	978-1569711644	
Aliens	Book One		Aliens (vol. 1) #1–6; "Theory of Alien Propagation" from Dark Horse Presents (vol. 1) #24	HC		June 1990	978-1878574084	
Aliens	Book II		Aliens (vol. 2) #1–4	HC		September 1990	978-1569710319	2500-copy Limited Edition.
Aliens	Book II		Aliens (vol. 2) #1–4	TP		October 1990	978-1878574039	
Aliens	Earth War		Aliens: Earth War #1–4	TP		July 1991	978-1878574237	
Aliens	Earth War		Aliens: Earth War #1–4	HC		December 1991	978-1569710326	
Aliens	Tribes		Aliens: Tribes	HC		August 1992	978-1569710142	1000-copy Limited Edition.
Aliens	Tribes		Aliens: Tribes	TP		February 1993	978-1878574688	
Aliens	Genocide		Aliens: Genocide #1–4	TP		December 1992	978-1569711231	
Aliens	Hive		Aliens: Hive #1–4	TP		February 1993	978-1569711224	
Aliens	Rogue		Aliens: Rogue #1–4	TP		October 1994	978-1569710234	
Aliens	Labyrinth		Aliens: Labyrinth #1–4; "Backsplash" from Dark Horse Comics #12–13	TP		August 1995	978-1569711101	
Aliens	Stronghold		Aliens: Stronghold #1–4	TP		July 1996	978-1569711545	
Aliens	1	Outbreak	Aliens (vol. 1) #1–6	TP		August 1996	978-1569711743	
Aliens	2	Nightmare Asylum	Aliens (vol. 2) #1–4	TP		October 1996	978-1569712177	
Aliens	3	Female War	Aliens: Earth War #1–4	TP		December 1996	978-1569711903	
Aliens	4	Genocide	Aliens: Genocide #1–4	TP		February 1997	978-1569711965	
Aliens	5	Harvest	Aliens: Hive #1–4	TP		February 1998	978-1569711989	
Aliens	6	Rogue	Aliens: Rogue #1–4	TP		August 1997	978-1569712672	
Aliens	7	Labyrinth	Aliens: Labyrinth #1–4; "Backsplash" from Dark Horse Comics #12–13	TP		March 1997	978-1569712450	
Aliens	8	Stronghold	Aliens: Stronghold #1–4	TP		July 1997	978-1569712627	
Aliens	Kidnapped		Aliens: Kidnapped #1–3; "Cargo" from Dark Horse Comics #15–16	TP		February 1999	978-1569713723	
Aliens	Apocalypse – The Destroying Angels		Aliens: Apocalypse – The Destroying Angels #1–4	TP	96	October 1999	978-1569713990	
Aliens	Salvation and Sacrifice		Aliens: Salvation; Aliens: Sacrifice	TP	112	March 2001	978-1569715611	
Aliens	More than Human		Aliens (vol. 3) #1–4	TP	96	April 2010	978-1595824905	
Aliens	Fire and Stone		Aliens: Fire and Stone #1–4; "Field Report" from Dark Horse Presents (vol. 3) #2	TP	104	May 2015	978-1616556556	
Aliens	Salvation		Alien: Salvation	HC	56	September 2015	978-1616557553	
Aliens	Life and Death		Aliens: Life and Death #1–4	TP	96	April 2017	978-1506701257	
Aliens	Dead Orbit		Aliens: Dead Orbit #1–4	TP	104	March 2018	978-1506703336	
Aliens	Dead Orbit		Aliens: Dead Orbit #1–4	HC	120	April 2019	978-1506709925	
Aliens	Dust to Dust		Aliens: Dust to Dust #1–4	TP	96	May 2019	978-1506707921	
Aliens	Resistance		Aliens: Resistance #1–4	TP	96	August 2019	978-1506711263	
Aliens	Rescue		Aliens: Rescue #1–4	TP	96	January 2020	978-1506711270	
Aliens: Defiance	1		Aliens: Defiance #1–6; "Extravehicular" from Free Comic Book Day 2016: General [Serenity/Hellboy/Aliens]	TP	160	January 2017	978-1506701264	
Aliens: Defiance	2		Aliens: Defiance #7–12	TP	152	September 2017	978-1506701684	
Aliens: Defiance	Library Edition		Aliens: Defiance #1–12; "Extravehicular" from Free Comic Book Day 2016: General [Serenity/Hellboy/Aliens]	HC	320	October 2019	978-1506714585	
Aliens Omnibus	1		Aliens (vol. 1) #1–6; Aliens (vol. 2) #1–4; Aliens: Earth War #1–4; "Theory of Alien Propagation" from Dark Horse Presents (vol. 1) #24; "The Alien" from Dark Horse Presents (vol. 1) #56	TP	384	July 2007	978-1593077273	
Aliens Omnibus	2		Aliens: Genocide #1–4; Aliens: Hive #1–4; Aliens: Colonial Marines #1–10	TP	448	December 2007	978-1593078287	
Aliens Omnibus	3		Aliens: Rogue #1–4; Aliens: Sacrifice; Aliens: Labyrinth #1–4; Aliens: Salvation; "Advent" and "Terminus" from Dark Horse Presents (vol. 1) #42–43; "Reapers" from Dark Horse Presents Fifth Anniversary Special; "Horror Show" from Dark Horse Comics #3–5	TP	376	March 2008	978-1593078720	
Aliens Omnibus	4		Aliens: Music of the Spears #1–4; Aliens: Stronghold #1–4; Aliens: Berserker #1–4; Aliens: Mondo Heat; "The Taste" from Dark Horse Comics #11; "Mondo Pest" from Dark Horse Comics #22–24	TP	376	July 2008	978-1593079260	
Aliens Omnibus	5		Aliens: Alchemy #1–3; Aliens: Kidnapped #1–3; "Cargo" from Dark Horse Comics #15–16; Aliens: Survival #1–3; "Alien" from Dark Horse Comics #17–19; Aliens: Earth Angel; "Incubation" from Dark Horse Presents #101–102; Aliens: Havoc #1–2; Aliens: Lovesick; "Lucky" from A Decade of Dark Horse #3	TP	364	October 2008	978-1593079918	
Aliens Omnibus	6		Aliens: Xenogenesis #1–4; "Headhunters" from Dark Horse Presents #117; "Tourist Season" from Dark Horse Presents Annual 1997; Aliens: Pig; "Borderlines" from Dark Horse Presents #121; Aliens Special; Aliens: Purge; Aliens: Glass Corridor; Aliens: Stalker; Aliens: Wraith; "Once in a Lifetime" from Dark Horse Presents #140	TP	376	December 2008	978-1595822147	
Aliens Predator Prometheus AVP	Fire and Stone		Prometheus: Fire and Stone #1–4; Aliens: Fire and Stone #1–4; Alien vs. Predator: Fire and Stone #1–4; Predator: Fire and Stone #1–4; Prometheus: Fire and Stone – Omega	TP	416	April 2018	978-1506707259	
Aliens Predator Prometheus AVP	The Complete Life and Death		Predator: Life and Death #1–4; Prometheus: Life and Death #1–4; Aliens: Life and Death #1–4; Alien vs. Predator: Life and Death #1–4; Prometheus: Life and Death – Final Conflict	HC	440	September 2018	978-1506706788	
Aliens: The Essential Comics	1		Aliens (vol. 1) #1–4; Aliens (vol. 2) #1–4; Aliens: Earth War #1–4	TP	368	October 2018	978-1506710037	
Aliens: The Original Comics Series	1		Aliens (vol. 1) #1–6	HC	200	April 2016	978-1506700786	
Aliens: The Original Comics Series	2		Aliens (vol. 2) #1–4; Aliens: Earth War #1–4	HC	224	April 2017	978-1506703565	
Aliens vs. Predator			"The Cracks in Our Technology" from Dark Horse Presents (vol. 1) #34; "The Old Ways Seem More Honest" from Dark Horse Presents (vol. 1) #35); "A Change of Scenery" from Dark Horse Presents (vol. 1) #36; Aliens vs. Predator #1–4; "Trophies" from Dark Horse Presents Fifth Anniversary Special	TP		December 1991	978-1569711255	
Aliens vs. Predator			"The Cracks in Our Technology" from Dark Horse Presents (vol. 1) #34; "The Old Ways Seem More Honest" from Dark Horse Presents (vol. 1) #35); "A Change of Scenery" from Dark Horse Presents (vol. 1) #36; Aliens vs. Predator #1–4; "Trophies" from Dark Horse Presents Fifth Anniversary Special	HC		December 1992	978-1569710333	1000-copy Limited Edition.
Aliens vs. Predator	Eternal		Aliens vs. Predator: Eternal #1–4	TP	88	September 1999	978-1569714096	
Aliens vs. Predator	Three World War		Aliens vs. Predator: Three World War #1–6	TP	144	June 2011	978-1595827029	
Aliens vs. Predator	30th Anniversary: The Original Comics Series		Aliens vs. Predator #0–4; "Trophies" from Dark Horse Presents Fifth Anniversary Special; Aliens vs. Predator: War #0	HC	192	July 2020	978-1506715681	
Aliens vs. Predator Omnibus	1		"The Cracks in Our Technology" from Dark Horse Presents (vol. 1) #34; "The Old Ways Seem More Honest" from Dark Horse Presents (vol. 1) #35); "A Change of Scenery" from Dark Horse Presents (vol. 1) #36; Aliens vs. Predator #1–4; "Trophies" from Dark Horse Presents Fifth Anniversary Special; "Blood Time" from Dark Horse Comics #25; Aliens vs. Predator: Duel #1–2; Aliens vs. Predator: War #0–4; Aliens vs. Predator: Eternal #1–4; "Old Secrets" Aliens vs. Predator Annual #1; "The Web" from Dark Horse Presents (vol. 1) #146–147	TP	384	June 2007	978-1593077358	
Aliens vs. Predator Omnibus	2		Aliens/Predator: The Deadliest of the Species #1–12; Aliens vs. Predator: Booty; "Hell-Bent", "Pursuit", "Lefty's Revenge" and "Chained to Life and Death" from Aliens vs. Predator Annual #1; Aliens vs. Predator: Xenogenesis #1–4	TP	448	October 2007	978-1593078294	
Alien vs. Predator: The Essential Comics	1		Aliens vs. Predator #1–4; Aliens vs. Predator: War #0–4; Aliens vs. Predator: Three World War #1–6	TP	424	October 2019	978-1506715674	
Aliens vs. Predator vs. The Terminator			Aliens vs. Predator vs. The Terminator #1–4	TP	96	May 2001	978-1569715680	
Aliens vs. Predator/Witchblade/Darkness: Mindhunter			Witchblade/Aliens/Darkness/Predator: Mindhunter #1–3	TP	96	August 2001	978-1569716151	
Aliens/Predator	War		Aliens vs. Predator: War #0–5; Aliens vs. Predator: Duel #1–2; "Blood Time" from Dark Horse Comics #25	TP		May 1996	978-1569711583	
Aliens/Predator	Deadliest of the Species		Aliens/Predator: The Deadliest of the Species #1–12	TP		November 1996	978-1569711842	
Aliens/Predator	Deadliest of the Species		Aliens/Predator: The Deadliest of the Species #1–12	HC	320	June 1997	978-1569711828	
Amala's Blade	1	Spirits of Naamaron	Amala's Blade #0–4; "Skulls and Crossbows" from Dark Horse Presents (vol. 2) #9–11	TP	144	January 2014	978-1616553326	
The Amazing Screw-On Head and Other Curious Objects			The Amazing Screw-on Head #1; new version of "Abu Gung and the Beanstalk" from Scatterbrain #1; "The Magician and the Snake" from Dark Horse Maverick: Happy Endings; three new stories by Mike Mignola	HC	104	September 2010	978-1595825018	
The Amazon			The Amazon #1–3 (Dark Horse Comics reprint)	HC	88	May 2010	978-1569718377	
The American	1		The American #1–4	TP		October 1988	978-1569710050	
The American			The American #1–8, Special; The American: Lost in America #1–4; "My Dinner with the American" from Dark Horse Presents (vol. 1) #32; The American stories from Dark Horse Presents Fifth Anniversary Special and A1 (vol. 1) #3	TP	360	November 2005	978-1593074197	
American Gods	1	Shadows	American Gods: Shadows #1–9	HC	208	February 2018	978-1506703862	
American Gods	2	My Ainsel	American Gods: My Ainsel #1–9	HC	232	April 2019	978-1506707303	
American Gods	3	The Moment of the Storm	American Gods: The Moment of the Storm #1–9	HC	224	June 2020	978-1506707310	
American Splendor	Unsung Hero		American Splendor: Unsung Hero #1–3	TP	80	August 2003	978-1593070403	
Ancient Joe	el bizarron		Ancient Joe story from Dark Horse Maverick 2000; Ancient Joe #1–3	TP	120	August 2002	978-1569717950	
Angel	The Hollower		Buffy the Vampire Slayer: Angel #1–3	TP	88	May 2000	978-1569714508	
Angel	Surrogates		Angel (vol.) #1–3	TP	80	December 2000	978-1569714911	
Angel	Earthly Possessions		Angel (vol. 1) #5–7	TP	80	April 2001	978-1569715338	
Angel	Hunting Ground		Angel (vol. 1) #8–9	TP	80	August 2001	978-1569715475	
Angel	Autumnal		Angel (vol. 1) #12–14	TP	80	January 2002	978-1569715598	
Angel	Strange Bedfellows and Other Stories		Angel (vol. 1) #4, 10–11, 17	TP	104	March 2002	978-1569717530	
Angel	Long Night's Journey		Angel (vol. 2) #1–4	TP	104	September 2002	978-1569717523	
Angel & Faith	1	Live Through This	Angel & Faith #1–5	TP	136	June 2012	978-1595828873	
Angel & Faith	2	Daddy Issues	Angel & Faith #6–10	TP	136	November 2012	978-1595829603	
Angel & Faith	3	Family Reunion	Angel & Faith #11–15	TP	136	April 2013	978-1616550790	
Angel & Faith	4	Death and Consequences	Angel & Faith #16–20	TP	136	September 2013	978-1616551650	
Angel & Faith	5	What You Want, Not What You Need	Angel & Faith #21–25	TP		February 2014	978-1616552534	
Angel & Faith Season 9 Library Edition	1		Angel & Faith #1–10	HC		March 2015	978-1616557126	
Angel & Faith Season 9 Library Edition	2		Angel & Faith #11–15; Spike: A Dark Place #1–5	HC	280	August 2015	978-1616557133	
Angel & Faith Season 9 Library Edition	3		Angel & Faith #16–25	HC	288	January 2016	978-1616557140	
Angel & Faith Season 10	1	Where the River Meets the Sea	Angel & Faith Season 10 #1–5	TP		December 2014	978-1616555030	
Angel & Faith Season 10	2	Lost and Found	Angel & Faith Season 10 #6–10	TP	136	May 2015	978-1616556013	
Angel & Faith Season 10	3	United	Angel & Faith Season 10 #11–15	TP	136	October 2015	978-1616557669	
Angel & Faith Season 10	4	A Little More Than Kin	Angel & Faith Season 10 #16–20	TP	136	March 2016	978-1616558901	
Angel & Faith Season 10	5	A Tale of Two Families	Angel & Faith Season 10 #21–25	TP	136	August 2016	978-1616559656	
Angel Omnibus			Angel (vol. 1) #1–14, 17; Angel (vol. 2) #1–4; "The Nepalese Switcheroo" from Dark Horse Extra #25–28; "Lovely, Dark and Deep" from Dark Horse Presents #153–155; "Point of Order" from TV Guide Ultimate Cable Magazine	TP	480	July 2011	978-1595827067	
Angel Season 11	1	Out of the Past	Angel Season 11 #1–4	TP	104	August 2017	978-1506703466	
Angel Season 11	2	Time and Tide	Angel Season 11 #5–8	TP	104	January 2018	978-1506703473	
Angel Season 11	3	Dark Reflections	Angel Season 11 #9–12	TP	112	April 2018	978-1506703879	
The Answer!			The Answer! #1–4	TP	96	October 2013	978-1616551971	
Anthem	Strong Alone, Stronger Together		Anthem #1–3	HC	72	August 2019	978-1506707075	
Anthony Bourdain's Hungry Ghosts			Hungry Ghosts #1–4	HC	128	September 2018	978-1506706696	
Apocalypse Nerd			Apocalypse Nerd #1–6	TP	120	March 2008	978-1593079024	
ApocalyptiGirl: An Aria for the End Times			ApocalyptiGirl: An Aria for the End Times	HC	128	March 2020	978-1506714646	
Appleseed	Databook		Appleseed Databook #1–2	TP		August 1995	978-1569711033	
ArchEnemies	1		ArchEnemies #1–4	TP	128	January 2007	978-1593076993	
Archie vs. Predator			Archie vs. Predator #1–4	HC	128	November 2015	978-1616558055	
Archie vs. Predator			Archie vs. Predator #1–4	TP	104	August 2019	978-1506714660	
Arkwright Integral			The Adventures of Luther Arkwright #1–9; Heart of Empire #1–9	HC	560	November 2014	978-1616553876	
Art Adams' Creature Features			Universal Monsters: Creature from the Black Lagoon; Godzilla Color Special #1; "The Shocking Case of the Brief Journey" from San Diego Comic Con Comics #2; "Trapped in the Lair of the Shrewmanoid" from Dark Horse Insider #27; "Trampling Tokyo" from Negative Burn #18	TP	104	August 1996	978-1569712146	
Assassin's Creed Valhalla	Song of Glory		Assassin's Creed Valhalla: Song of Glory #1–3	HC	72	April 2021	978-1506719290	
Axe Cop	1		first run of webstrips			Dec 2010		
Axe Cop	2	Bad Guy Earth	Axe Cop: Bad Guy Earth #1–3			Oct 2011		
Axe Cop	3					Mar 2012		
Axe Cop	4	President of the World	Axe Cop: President of the World #1–3			Jul 2013		
Axe Cop	5	Axe Cop Gets Married and Other Stories				Feb 2014		
Axe Cop	6		Axe Cop: The American Choppers #1–3			Nov 2014		

== N ==
Title	Vol.	Vol. title	Material collected	Format	Pages	Publication date	ISBN	Notes
Nickelodeon Avatar: The Last Airbender	The Lost Adventures		Avatar: The Last Airbender minicomics from seasons 2–3 DVD sets; Avatar: The Last Airbender Free Comic Book Day 2011; Nickelodeon Comics #31, 33, 35 (Airbender stories); Nickelodeon Magazine #124, 127, 140, 158 (Airbender stories); Nick Mag Presents #18, 23 (Airbender stories)			Jun 2011		
Nickelodeon Avatar: The Last Airbender	The Promise		#1–3	HC		Feb 2013		Library Edition
Nickelodeon Avatar: The Last Airbender	The Search		#1–3	HC		Feb 2014		Library Edition
Nickelodeon Avatar: The Last Airbender	The Rift		#1–3	HC		Feb 2015		Library Edition
Nickelodeon Avatar: The Last Airbender	Smoke and Shadow		#1–3	HC		Sep 2015 – Mar 2016		Library Edition

== P ==
Title	Vol.	Vol. title	Material collected	Format	Pages	Publication date	ISBN	Notes
Predator	Fire and Stone		Predator: Fire and Stone #1–4	TP	104	July 2015	978-1616556952	
Predator	Life and Death		Predator: Life and Death #1–4	TP	96	October 2016	978-1506700502	
Prometheus	Fire and Stone		Prometheus: Fire and Stone #1–4	TP	104	April 2015	978-1616556501	
Prometheus	The Complete Fire and Stone		Prometheus: Fire and Stone #1–4; Aliens: Fire and Stone #1–4; Alien vs. Predator: Fire and Stone #1–4; Predator: Fire and Stone #1–4; Prometheus: Fire and Stone – Omega	HC	480	October 2015	978-1616557720	
Prometheus	Life and Death		Prometheus: Life and Death #1–4	TP	96	January 2017	978-1506701035	

== S ==
Title	Vol.	Vol. title	Material collected	Format	Pages	Publication date	ISBN	Notes
Star Wars Omnibus: X-Wing Rogue Squadron	1		X-Wing: Rogue Leader Star Wars: X-Wing Rogue Squadron: The Rebel Opposition; Star Wars: X-Wing Rogue Squadron: The Phantom Affair; Handbook 1: X-Wing Rogue Squadron	TP		Jun 2006		
Star Wars Omnibus: X-Wing Rogue Squadron	2		Star Wars: X-Wing Rogue Squadron Special; Star Wars: X-Wing Rogue Squadron: Battleground: Tatooine; Star Wars: X-Wing Rogue Squadron: The Warrior Princess; Star Wars: X-Wing Rogue Squadron: Requiem for a Rogue	TP		Oct 2006		
Star Wars Omnibus: X-Wing Rogue Squadron	3		Star Wars: X-Wing Rogue Squadron: In the Empire's Service; Star Wars: X-Wing Rogue Squadron: The Making of Baron Fel; Star Wars: X-Wing Rogue Squadron: Family Ties; Star Wars: X-Wing Rogue Squadron: Masquerade; Star Wars: X-Wing Rogue Squadron: Mandatory Retirement	TP		Jun 2007		

== X ==
Title	Vol.	Vol. title	Material collected	Format	Pages	Publication date	ISBN	Notes
X	1	Big Bad	X (vol. 2) #0–4			Jan 2014		
X	2	The Dogs of War	X (vol. 2) #5–8			Apr 2014		
X	3	Siege	X (vol. 2) #9–12			Aug 2014		
X	4	Better Off Dead	X (vol. 2) #13–16			Dec 2014		
X	5	Flesh and Blood	X (vol. 2) #17–20			Apr 2015		
X	6	Marked for Death – Enter the Mark	X (vol. 2) #21–24			Sep 2015		
X Omnibus	1		X (vol. 1) #1–11; X: Hero Illustrated Special #1–2; X: One Shot to the Head; "Welcome to the Jungle" from Dark Horse Comics #19–20	TP		May 2008		
X Omnibus	2		X (vol. 1) #12–25; "Someone to Watch Over Me" from Dark Horse Extra #28–31	TP		Aug 2008		
