= Ricardo Delgado (comics) =

American artist

Ricardo Delgado is an American film and comic book artist who has worked on films including Dinosaur, The Incredibles, Men in Black and Apollo 13.

He is the author and creator of the comic book series Age of Reptiles which won an Eisner award for Talent Deserving of Wider Recognition in 1997.

Delgado was an illustrator in Herman F. Zimmerman’s design team on the pilot and first season of Star Trek: Deep Space Nine, contributing towards the design of the exteriors and interiors of the station itself, storyboarding the series opening titles under Dan Curry’s direction, and providing a fresh set of eyes compared to his colleagues like Zimmerman and Rick Sternbach who had come from previous Star Trek series and movies.
