= Jason Shawn Alexander =

American painter

- Alexander at Dragon Con in 2026
- Born: 1975 (age 50–51)
- Areas: Artist, illustrator, draftsman, inker, storyteller
- Pseudonym: J. Alexander
- Notable works: Abe Sapien; Damn Nation; The Escapists; Queen & Country; Secret

Jason Shawn Alexander or J. Alexander (born 1975) is an American painter, illustrator and draftsman.

Alexander has produced illustrations for Dark Horse Comics, Warner Brothers, DC Comics, Hasbro, White Wolf, Inc, and Dalmatian Press.

His creator-owned Empty Zone was published for years by Sirius Entertainment. He also contributed to Poison Elves: Lusiphur and Linlith, also for Sirius Entertainment.

Alexander's work can be seen at Corey Helford Gallery in Los Angeles and 101/exhibit in Miami and New York.

== Bibliography ==
=== Dark Horse Comics ===
- Abe Sapien: The Drowning
- Damnation
- The Escapists
- The Secret
- Tales of the Vampires
- Dark Horse: Twenty Years
- Conan and the Midnight God (covers)

=== Other ===
- Spawn (2017–2020)
- Killadelphia
- Crypt of Dawn
- Gotham Central
- Queen & Country: Operation Blackwall
- Fear The Dead: A Zombie Survivor's Journal
- Poison Elves: Lusiphur and Lirilith
- Poison Elves Sketchbook
- Van Helsing: From Beneath the Rue Morgue
- Mikanno (sketchbook, 2002–2004)
- Dead Irons (with James Kuhoric, 5-issue mini-series, Dynamite Entertainment)
- "The Raven", in Mouse Guard: Legends of the Guard, volume 1, issue #3 (2010), an adaptation of Edgar Allan Poe's poem The Raven.
