= Damn Nation =

- Cover of the first issue

Publication information
- Publisher: Dark Horse Comics
- Schedule: Monthly
- Format: Mini-series
- Genre: Vampire
- Publication date: February - April 2005
- No. of issues: 3

Creative team
- Written by: Andrew Cosby
- Artist: Jason Shawn Alexander
- Letterer: Clem Robins
- Colorist: Jason Shawn Alexander
- Editor(s): Scott Allie; Matt Dryer

Collected editions
- Damn Nation: ISBN 1-59307-389-5

Damn Nation is a three-issue horror comic book mini-series published by Dark Horse Comics in 2005 and written by Andrew Cosby with artwork from Jason Shawn Alexander.

== Collected editions ==
The comic was published over three issues and collected in a trade paperback:

- Damn Nation (3-issue mini-series, 2005, Dark Horse, tpb, 104 pages, 2005, ISBN 1-59307-389-5)

== Movie adaptation ==
A film adaptation was announced by Paramount Pictures in 2009, to be written by Ashley Edward Miller and Zack Stentz; as of 2015, however, it has not been produced.

== Background ==
The Cliffhanger comic book series Out There refers to a comic book series entitled Damn Nation, which happens to be three issues as well.
