= Van Helsing: From Beneath the Rue Morgue =

Comic book published by Dark Horse Comics

Publication information
- Publisher: Dark Horse Comics
- Schedule: One-shot
- No. of issues: 1
- Main character(s): Van Helsing; Dr. Moreau

Creative team
- Created by: Stephen Sommers
- Written by: Joshua Dysart
- Artist: Jason Shawn Alexander
- Penciller(s): Joshua Dysart; Jason Shawn Alexander

Van Helsing: From Beneath the Rue Morgue is a one-shot comic book from Dark Horse Comics, based on the 2004 film Van Helsing. It is based on the premise that Gabriel Van Helsing lived in Paris, and from his own perspective, telling his story through an inform sent to the Monsignor. The comic is a side-story, set within the same timeline of the Van Helsing universe. The comic book draws inspiration from the 1841 short story The Murders in the Rue Morgue by Edgar Allan Poe and The Invisible Man and The Island of Doctor Moreau by H. G. Wells, as well as the 1954 film Creature from the Black Lagoon.

== Plot ==
The story launches in medias res, as Van Helsing jumps into action through a window. The woman is floating in the air, reminding him that he had not slept in 52 hours. The story then begins in full, and Van Helsing is inside Notre-Dame de Paris, just after the murder of Mr. Hyde. He is found guilty by the authorities, but is given the opportunity of escape by the priests. Van Helsing then proceeds to escape through the sewers to stay at a secluded room.

During the night, he hears a scream and ventures to track it down. In the comic's beginning, the floating woman is revealed to be a medium. She is dragged towards a chimney as Van Helsing gives chase. He tries to help the woman by attacking with his tojo blades and releases her, only to see the woman grabbed once more by the invisible force. It throws both her and Van Helsing through a window. The woman is killed in the fall and Van Helsing is once again hunted by the authorities. Undaunted, he proceeds to chase the invisible force, guided by screams and destruction left in its wake. Van Helsing wonders aloud "Why is it monsters never run into bodice shops?" as the invisible monster enters the morgue.

The people and the police surround the building and Van Helsing escapes through the sewers once again, only to find himself faced with the invisible monster. The monster drags him into the water and they travel through the canal, until they fall into a cage trap. Van Helsing easily escapes, but finds himself between cages and bars, corpses and monsters, and half-beasts and half-humans. He states that he has "finally and fully sensed evil". Documents on a nearby desk reveal that the monster is named Beathán. It says that he was injected with a serum of invisibility (Van Helsing even remembers having heard a Vatican report about an incident of an "Englishman" becoming invisible in West Sussex). Van Helsing learns that he is in the secret laboratory of the mad scientist Dr. Moreau.

He suddenly finds himself with the same, about to feed the invisible monster. They discourse about the creation of the chimeras in his laboratory. Van Helsing states that it is not his job to kill him and his creations, but he will arrest him for the matter. Moreau, however, is not fazed, and releases Beathán. Van Helsing fights the monster, first turning him visible with the antidote to the invisibility serum that Moreau had invented and later fighting him with his own weapons. The fight becomes violent as time passes, and the monster (resembling the Gill-man), now visible, releases the rest of Moreau's creations. Van Helsing then proceeds to fight all of them.

Through spiritual talk, however, the medium that Van Helsing encountered before tells him that the monster is her husband, transformed into a frog-like beast by the Doctor, and that he must relieve the beast from his torment. Moreau takes the confusion to his advantage, and he escapes without being seen, leaving his laboratory to be destroyed. Van Helsing and Beathán manage to escape and Van Helsing briefly ponders taking the beast with him to the Vatican. Finally, he reports that he "put forth all effort in trying to capture it . . . and failed", when, in reality, he just let the monster go. Van Helsing ends his report by stating that he had not slept in 53 hours.

The final image of Moreau sees his escaping with one of his creations, stating that "the world lacks vision", and that he should "move to an island perhaps. Somewhere drastic, like . . . the South Seas . . .".
