= The Secret (Dark Horse Comics) =

Dark Horse Comics limited series

- Cover for Trade Paperback

Publication information
- Publisher: Dark Horse Comics
- Schedule: Monthly
- Format: Limited series
- Genre: Horror
- Publication date: February 7, 2007 – May 9, 2007
- No. of issues: 4

Creative team
- Written by: Mike Richardson
- Artist(s): Jason Shawn Alexander

Collected editions
- The Secret: ISBN 978-1-59307-821-8

The Secret is a 4-issue limited series comic book written by Mike Richardson and drawn by Jason Shawn Alexander. It was released by Dark Horse Comics in 2007. It was later converted to a Motion comic.

== Plot Synopsis ==
High-school student Tommy Morris attends a party at his friend Pam's house where students prank call a random number and say "I know your secret" and tells the person on the other end to meet them at a local park at midnight. Pam calls a man who replies in a monstrous voice "How do you know my secret?" Shortly after, Pam disappears mysteriously. With the police not helping, Tommy must work alone to discover who was on the phone that night and what happened to Pam.

== Collected Editions ==
The series was collected as a trade paperback in 2007.

== In Other Media ==
In 2009, Universal Pictures acquired the rights to make a film adaptation. Mike Richardson was set to produce, along with Scott Stuber.

In March 2012, it was announced that Felicia Day's YouTube channel Geek & Sundry would air Dark Horse Motion comics. The Secret premiered with the channel on April 2, and ran daily until the 5th.
