= Wizard (comics) =

Wizard, in comics, may refer to:

- Wizard (Archie Comics), an Archie Comics character
- Wizard (DC Comics), a villain from the Golden Age of Comics and a member of the Injustice Society
- Wizard (Marvel Comics), a Fantastic Four villain who has led a number of Frightful Four teams
- Wizard (magazine), a magazine about comic books

== See also ==
- Wizard (disambiguation)
- Aqueduct (comics), a Marvel Comics character also known as the Water Wizard
- Weather Wizard, a DC Comics supervillain
