= Ancient Joe =

Comic book series

Cover of the first issue

Ancient Joe is a comic book series created by Scott Morse and published by Dark Horse Comics in 2002.
