= Age of Reptiles (comics) =

Comic strip

Front cover of Tribal Warfare.

Front cover of The Hunt.

Age of Reptiles is a comic book series written by Ricardo Delgado and published by Dark Horse Comics about the lives of carnivorious dinosaurs. The comic originally consisted of two editions set in the Mesozoic era: Tribal Warfare (1993) and The Hunt (1996). A third series, The Journey, began in November 2009, with a fourth, "Ancient Egyptians", debuting in June 2015. Tribal Warfare, The Hunt, and The Journey have been collected in Age of Reptiles Omnibus, Volume 1.

== Tribal Warfare ==
This story follows the conflict between Blue Back, a Tyrannosaurus, and a pack of Deinonychus. Many of the animals depicted in the story were not alive at the same time period or place, and their inclusion was added for familiarity and dramatic effect.

== The Hunt ==
This story follows the life of a juvenile Allosaurus after its mother is killed by a pack of Ceratosaurus. The Hunt received an Eisner award for Talent Deserving of Wider Recognition in 1997.

== The Journey ==
The Journey was published in 2009–10. It tells the sprawling migration of a herd of dinosaurs. The story begins with a sweeping depiction of the North American Cretaceous forest, where a massive herd of dinosaur such as Alamosaurus, Ankylosaurus, Edmontosaurus, Triceratops, and Ornithomimus are preparing to migrate.

== The Body ==
"The Body," an eight-page short story, was published in Dark Horse Presents #4 in Sept. 2011. It concerns what happens to a dinosaur's body after it dies. The story begins with a pack of three Acrocanthosaurus hunting down and killing a Tenontosaurus. The tenotosaurus carcass is scavenged and picked clean by other predators before finally being buried by the elements, waiting to be excavated millions of years later.

== Baby Turtles ==
"Baby Turtles," an eight-page short story, was published in Dark Horse Presents #3 in Oct. 2014. The story begins with a large group of Archelon turtles hatching in a nesting ground and beginning a trek towards the sea. The hatching turtles attracts huge numbers of predators, such as Pterosaurs, mosasaurs, plesiosaurs, sharks, and Xiphactinus fish. While many fall prey, the turtles' sheer numbers means that many survive to make their way out into the open ocean.

== Ancient Egyptians ==
Ancient Egyptians is set in prehistoric Africa. It features a Spinosaurus as the protagonist, and the first installment came out on June 3, 2015. It was concluded in September 2015.

== See also ==
- Gon, a similar pantomime comic about dinosaurs.
