= ArchEnemies =

- Cover of the first issue

Publication information
- Publisher: Dark Horse Comics
- Schedule: Monthly
- Format: Mini-series
- Genre: Superhero
- Publication date: April - July 2006
- No. of issues: 4

Creative team
- Written by: Drew Melbourne
- Penciller(s): Yvel Guichet
- Inker(s): Joe Rubinstein
- Letterer(s): Jim Kerplinger
- Colorist(s): Rick Hiltbrunner
- Editor(s): Philip Simon

Collected editions
- Sinners and Saints: ISBN 1-59307-699-1

ArchEnemies is a comic book mini-series put out by Dark Horse Comics from April 5, 2006 until July 5, 2006. The series was created and written by Drew Melbourne with art by Yvel Guichet and Joe Rubinstein.

== Plot ==
The 4-part series focuses on the superhero Star Fighter and his archenemy Underlord, as well as roommates Ethan and Vincent. They just happen to be the same people, though neither Ethan (Star Fighter) nor Vincent (Underlord) are aware of that fact.

Ethan and Vincent are each horrible roommates, though they are unable to give up their apartment in order to escape the other. Ethan's a slob who likes throwing parties simply to annoy Vincent. Vincent is creepy. Vincent most likely hates Ethan more than he ever could hate Star Fighter.

At the same time as they're fighting between each other (in both their identities), Vincent is attempting to become a member of The Masked Circle, a secret society of supervillains that both his father and brother already belong to.

== Characters ==
=== Main characters ===
- Ethan Baxter: The buff, handsome, laid back alter ego of the superhero Star Fighter. Ethan works at Morpheus Books, a publishing company, with his sometimes lover Trish. Ethan is a slob, a partier, and just a bit emotional when it comes to both of his identities. He is originally from Iowa, a fact which is disclosed in some back-story during the fourth book. His powers come from the control of "stellar energy" which grants him the ability to fly and shoot energy blasts, along with various other gifts.
- Vincent Darko: The lanky, dark haired genius and geek who also happens to be the villain Underlord. Both his father and his older brother are supervillains and Vincent was raised to follow in their evil footsteps. He has no real superpowers, instead relying on devices he buys over the Internet. He has boasted that he has some skill with hypnosis, but he has yet to demonstrate this talent.

=== Other characters ===
- Trish Darrow: A blue haired marketing assistant at Morpheus Books. She went to art school and is constantly doodling throughout the comics, on post-it notes as well as Ethan's bedroom wall at one point. She has an on-again-off-again relationship with Ethan.
- King of Masks: The leader of The Masked Circle, he's smart, ruthless, and can shoot energy beams from his eyes. He's also incredibly hard to kill.
- Anton Darko: Vincent's sleazy, corporate brother who is also in on the supervillain lifestyle. He was raised by their father to be the heir to his evil empire and was given the power to talk to birds.
- Vlad Darko: Vincent's evil, rich father who has elongated his life through various means.
- Adriana Darko: Vincent's sister, a good looking girl who immediately hits it off with Ethan, due to a similar sense of humor.
- Webface: A huge, muscular African-American man with a web tattoo on his head. He was introduced in the series when he interviewed to be one of Vincent's lackeys, but has become more complicated.
- Nanoman: A tiny superhero who listens to Star Fighter's problems in Issue #2. He offers both philosophical and real-life advice, including giving Star Fighter the number for his tailor. He also has an interview at the end of the same issue, in a Q&A format.
- Cat: Ethan's pet cat, seen in the first issue drinking absinthe.

== Collected editions ==
The series has been collected into a trade paperback:

- Sinners and Saints (128 pages, January 2007, ISBN 1-59307-699-1)

== Film ==
As of September 2006, Sam Raimi has signed a deal to adapt the series into a film. Screenwriter Patrick O'Neill (Knight and Day), was hired to write the script; Raimi will act as producer along with Mike Richardson and Josh Donen.
