= Star Wars: X-wing – Rogue Squadron =

Comic book series

Star Wars: X-wing Rogue Squadron #1 (July 1995)

Star Wars: X-wing – Rogue Squadron is a series of comic books written by Michael Stackpole (who also wrote the Star Wars: X-wing novel series) and Darko Macan and published by Dark Horse Comics. The first issue was released on July 1, 1995. It ran for 35 issues. The story is set in the Star Wars galaxy approximately one year after Return of the Jedi.

A three-issue prequel series titled X-Wing – Rogue Leader was released in 2005, depicting Luke Skywalker's final mission with Rogue Squadron.

== Story arcs ==
=== The Rebel Opposition (1995) ===
The art is by Allen Nunis. (Note: Formerly Al Williamson's assistant; the two collaborated on Classic Star Wars compilations of the latter's work between 1992 and 1994.) The Rebel Alliance's Rogue Squadron defend the New Republic against the remnants of the Empire shortly after the events of Return of the Jedi.

=== The Phantom Affair (1996) ===
Rogue Squadron must travel to a neutral planet to secure new cloaking technology from the Empire being sold to the highest bidder.

=== Battleground: Tatooine (1996) ===
Rogue Squadron goes to Tatooine to find a secret cache of weapons hidden by Sate Pestage, on the Darklighters' farm.

=== Requiem for a Rogue (1997) ===
Rogue Squadron is sent to track down a lost Bothan ship full of innocent civilians; victim of a rare computer bug that transposes spatial coordinates. They soon learn that the mission is far more complicated. Wedge Antilles is shot down and presumed dead. The wild, savage humanoid natives are armed with Imperial blasters. Most everyone is acting completely out of character.

The Rogues must work with the Bothans to simply survive, rescue Wedge and discover the source of the strange energies making everyone off-kilter.

=== In the Empire's Service (1997) ===
Rogue Squadron and General Horton Salm's Defender Wing must take the Brentaal System from the hands of a slothful Imperial General, who has an ace up his sleeve. Recently assigned to Brentaal is the 181st Squadron, the Fighting 181st, led by none other than the deadly Baron Soontir Fel.

=== The Making of Baron Fel (1997) ===
Rogue Squadron mourns their lost comrades from the Battle of Brentaal, while on a mission of mercy on Corellia. The newly defected Baron Fel's family has been taken hostage, and its up to Rogue Squadron to get them out safely. During Soontir Fel's interrogation, he tells a tale of Imperial corruption and deception, and slowly executes a plan to defect to the Alliance. Along the way the Rogues encounter future allies and enemies in the form of two maverick CorSec officers, and an incompetent Imperial Liaison Officer.

=== Masquerade (1998) ===
Han Solo, Chewbacca, and Winter (disguised as Princess Leia) join the Rogues on a mission to Ciutric to make contact with Imperial Grand Vizier Sate Pestage, who wishes to defect.

=== Special issues ===
- X-wing Rogue Squadron: Apple Jacks Special Bonus Story
- X-wing Rogue Squadron 1/2

=== Prequel series ===
X-Wing – Rogue Leader is a three-part comic book series published by Dark Horse between September 28 and December 21, 2005.

The story begins shortly after the events of the novel The Truce at Bakura, which itself takes place in the days following the end of the film Return of the Jedi. Rogue Squadron, here consisting of Luke Skywalker, Wedge Antilles, Tycho Celchu, Wes Janson, and Ten Numb, are assigned to search for Imperial activity in the Corellian system. Coronet, the capital city of the planet Corellia, is attacked by Imperial forces, and Ten Numb is captured. Rogue Squadron infiltrates an Imperial base on the nearby planet Tralus, where Ten had been taken prisoner and tortured. While they succeed in defeating the Imperial forces there, Ten succumbs to his injuries before he can be saved.

At the conclusion of the story, Luke Skywalker leaves Rogue Squadron to focus on building a New Jedi Order, while many more pilots volunteer to join the squadron. The first mission of the newly expanded Rogue Squadron is to meet up with a Rebel supply convoy, setting up the first arc of the original series.

== Trade paperbacks ==
- Star Wars: X-wing Rogue Squadron – The Phantom Affair
- Star Wars: X-wing Rogue Squadron – Battleground: Tatooine
- Star Wars: X-wing Rogue Squadron – The Warrior Princess
- Star Wars: X-wing Rogue Squadron – Requiem for a Rogue
- Star Wars: X-wing Rogue Squadron – In the Empire's Service
- Star Wars: X-wing Rogue Squadron – Blood and Honor
- Star Wars: X-wing Rogue Squadron – Masquerade
- Star Wars: X-wing Rogue Squadron – Mandatory Retirement
- Omnibus: X-wing Rogue Squadron – Volume 1
- Omnibus: X-wing Rogue Squadron – Volume 2
- Omnibus: X-wing Rogue Squadron – Volume 3
- Omnibus: The Other Sons of Tatooine
- Epic Collection: Star Wars – The New Republic, Volumes 2–3
