= List of Alien (franchise) comics =

The Alien comic books are part of the Alien franchise and have had several titles published based on the license, most of which are part of the Dark Horse Comics line, but other comics by other distributors have been made. Marvel Comics obtained the license to the Aliens, Predator and Alien vs. Predator comics following the acquisition of 21st Century Fox by The Walt Disney Company.

== Alien: The Illustrated Story ==
Alien: The Illustrated Story is a critically acclaimed graphic novel adaptation of the original 1979 movie Alien, published by Heavy Metal magazine the same year. The creative team consisted of Archie Goodwin as the scriptwriter and Walt Simonson as the artist. It won the Harvey Award for Best Graphic Album of Previously Published Work in 2013.

== Dark Horse Comics ==
Dark Horse Comics is the most well-known publisher of Aliens comics, having published many limited series from 1988 to 1999. Publishing took a hiatus until 2009. The Predator creature exists in this extended comic universe due to multiple Alien vs. Predator crossovers.

=== Comics ===
| Title | | Issues | Publication date | Notes |
Limited series
| Aliens | vol. 1 | #1–6 | May 1988 – July 1989 | Sequel to the 1986 film Aliens. Also known as Aliens: Outbreak. Adapted into the novel Aliens: Earth Hive (1992). |
| Aliens | vol. 2 | #1–4 | August 1989 – May 1990 | Sequel to the first series. Also known as Aliens: Nightmare Asylum. Adapted into the novel Aliens: Nightmare Asylum (1993). |
| Aliens: Earth War | | #1–4 | June 1990 – October 1990 | Sequel to Aliens (vol. 2). Also known as Aliens: Female War. Adapted into the novel Aliens: The Female War (1993). |
| Aliens: Genocide | | #1–4 | November 1991 – February 1992 | Adapted into the novel Aliens: Genocide (1993) |
| Aliens: Hive | | #1–4 | February 1992 – May 1992 | Later known as Aliens: Harvest. Adapted into the novel Aliens: Alien Harvest (1995). |
| Alien 3 | | #1–3 | June 1992 – July 1992 | Comic adaptation of the 1992 film Alien 3. |
| Aliens: Newt's Tale | | #1–2 | June 1992 – July 1992 | |
| Aliens: Colonial Marines | | #1–10 | January 1993 – July 1994 | Originally meant to be a 12 issue limited series. |
| Aliens: Rogue | | #1–4 | April 1993 – July 1993 | Adapted into the novel Aliens: Rogue (1995) |
| Aliens: Labyrinth | | #1–4 | September 1993 – January 1994 | Adapted into the novel Aliens: Labyrinth (1996) |
| Aliens: Music of the Spears | | #1–4 | January 1994 – April 1994 | Adapted into the novel Aliens: Music of the Spear (1996) |
| Aliens: Stronghold | | #1–4 | May 1994 – September 1994 | |
| Aliens: Berserker | | #1–4 | January 1995 – April 1995 | Adapted into the novel Aliens: Berserker (1998) |
| Aliens: Havoc | | #1–2 | June 1997 – July 1997 | Story by Mark Schultz, every page of the story is drawn by a different artist. |
| Alien Resurrection | | #1–2 | October 1997 – November 1997 | |
| Aliens: Alchemy | | #1–3 | October 1997 – November 1997 | |
| Aliens: Kidnapped | | #1–3 | December 1997 – February 1998 | |
| Aliens: Survival | | #1–3 | February 1998 – April 1998 | |
| Aliens: Apocalypse- The Destroying Angels | | #1–4 | January 1999 – April 1999 | |
| Aliens: Xenogenesis | | #1–4 | August 1999 – November 1999 | |
| Aliens | vol. 3 | #1–4 | May 2009 – November 2009 | |
| Aliens: Fire and Stone | | #1–4 | September 2014 – December 2014 | Fire and Stone crossover event tie-in comics. |
| Prometheus: Fire and Stone | | #1–4 | September 2014 – December 2014 | Fire and Stone crossover event tie-in comics. |
| Aliens: Defiance | | #1–12 | April 2016 – June 2017 | |
| Prometheus: Life and Death | | #1–4 | June 2016 – September 2016 | Life and Death crossover event tie-in comics. |
| Aliens: Life and Death | | #1–4 | September 2016 – December 2016 | Life and Death crossover event tie-in comics. |
| Aliens: Dead Orbit | | #1–4 | April 2017 – December 2017 | |
| Aliens: Dust to Dust | | #1–4 | April 2018 – January 2019 | |
| William Gibson's Alien 3 | | #1–5 | November 2018 – March 2019 | |
| Aliens: Resistance | | #1–4 | January 2019 – May 2019 | |
| Aliens: Rescue | | #1–4 | July 2019 – October 2019 | |
| Alien: The Original Screenplay | | #1–5 | August 2020 – December 2020 | Comic adaptation of the original 1976 screenplay for Alien by Dan O'Bannon. |
One-shots
| Aliens Mini-Comic | | #1 | February 1989 | Short story including a portfolio of high-quality prints. |
| Aliens: Sacrifice | | | May 1993 | |
| Aliens: Salvation | | | November 1993 | Prestige format. |
| Aliens: Earth Angel | | #1 | August 1994 | Reprints the 13-part story from Previews (vol. 3) #1–12 and (vol. 4) #1. |
| Aliens: Mondo Pest | | | April 1995 | Reprints "Mondo Pest" stories from Dark Horse Comics #22–24. |
| Aliens: Mondo Heat | | | February 1996 | Sequel to Aliens: Mondo Pest. |
| Aliens: Lovesick | | | December 1996 | |
| Aliens: Pig | | | March 1997 | |
| Aliens Special | | #1 | June 1997 | |
| Aliens: Purge | | | August 1997 | |
| Aliens: Glass Corridor | | | June 1998 | |
| Aliens: Stalker | | | June 1998 | |
| Aliens: Wraith | | | July 1998 | |
| Aliens: Colonial Marines – No Man Left Behind | | | July 2012 | Tie-in comic to the Aliens: Colonial Marines video game. |
| Alien Isolation | | | 2014 | |
| Prometheus: Fire and Stone, Omega | | | February 2015 | Fire and Stone crossover event tie-in comic. |
| Prometheus: Life and Death | | | April 2017 | Life and Death crossover event tie-in comic. Not to be confused with the miniseries listed above. |
Crossovers
| Superman/Aliens | | #1–3 | July 1995 – September 1995 | Co-published with DC Comics. |
| Batman/Aliens | | #1–2 | March 1997 – April 1997 | Co-published with DC Comics. |
| WildC.A.T.S./Aliens | | #1 | August 1998 | Co-published with Image Comics. Reprinted in StormWatch Vol. 5: Final Orbit collected edition. |
| Aliens vs. Predator vs. The Terminator | | #1-4 | April - July 2000 | |
| Green Lantern Versus Aliens | | #1–4 | September 2000 – December 2000 | Co-published with DC Comics. |
| Superman/Aliens 2: God War | | #1–4 | May 2002 – November 2002 | Co-published with DC Comics. |
| Batman/Aliens II | | #1–3 | 2003 | Co-published with DC Comics. |
| Judge Dredd versus Aliens: Incubus | | #1–4 | March 2003 – June 2003 | Co-published with 2000 AD. |
| Aliens Vampirella | | #1–6 | September 2015 – February 2016 | Co-published with Dynamite Entertainment. |
Other
| Aliens: Tribes | | | August 1992 | Hardcover graphic novella. 1000-copy Limited Edition. ISBN: 978-1569710142 |
| Aliens: Tribes | | | February 1993 | Softcover edition graphic novella. ISBN: 978-1878574688 |
| Aliens: Space Marines | | #1–12 | 1993 | Mini-comics packaged with Aliens action figures sold by Kenner Toys. |
| Aliens: Fast Track to Heaven | | | November 2011 | Deluxe-sized hardcover graphic novella by Liam Sharp. ISBN: 978-1595824950 |

=== Stories ===
Stories based on the Alien franchise published in other comics, such as the Dark Horse Presents anthology title.

| Story title | Issue | Publication date | Notes |
|---|---|---|---|
| "Theory of Alien Propagation" | Dark Horse Presents #24 | November 1988 | Title of the story is taken from the reprint in Aliens Omnibus. Originally untitled. |
| "Part One: Advent" | Dark Horse Presents #42–43 | July 1990 – August 1990 | Two-part story. |
| "Part Two: Terminus" | Dark Horse Presents #42–43 | July 1990 – August 1990 | Two-part story. |
| "Countdown" | Dark Horse Insider #14–27 | September 1990 – October 1991 | Fourteen-part story. |
| "Reapers" | Dark Horse Presents Fifth Anniversary Special | April 1991 | Title of the story is taken from the reprint in Aliens Omnibus. Originally untitled. |
| "The Alien" | Dark Horse Presents #56 | November 1991 | Story is separated in two halves, the first at the beginning of the issue, and the second at the end. |
| "Horror Show" | Dark Horse Comics #3–5 | October 1992 – December 1992 | Three-part story. |
| "Earth Angel" | Previews (vol. 3) #1–12, (vol. 4) #1 | January 1993 – January 1994 | Later reprinted as a one-shot by Dark Horse. |
| "Alien 3: Terminal Addiction" | Alien magazine (vol. 2) #12 | June 1993 | Published by Dark Horse International. |
| "The Taste" | Dark Horse Comics #11 | July 1993 | |
| "Backsplash" | Dark Horse Comics #12–13 | August 1993 – September 1993 | Two-part story. |
| "Cargo" | Dark Horse Comics #15–16 | November 1993 – December 1993 | Two-part story. |
| "Alien" | Dark Horse Comics #17–19 | January 1994 – March 1994 | Three-part story. |
| "Mondo Pest" | Dark Horse Comics #22–24 | June 1994 – August 1994 | Three-part story. |
| "Incubation" | Dark Horse Presents #101–102 | September 1995 – October 1995 | Two-part story. |
| "Lucky" | A Decade of Dark Horse #3 | September 1996 | |
| "Headhunter" | Dark Horse Presents #117 | January 1997 | |
| "Borderlines" | Dark Horse Presents #121 | May 1997 | |
| "Tourist Season" | Dark Horse Presents Annual 1997 | February 1998 | Indicia date says February 1998. |
| "Once in a Lifetime" | Dark Horse Presents #140 | February 1999 | |
| | Free Comic Book Day: Aliens / Predator | May 2009 | Story is untitled. Issue also features a Predator story. |
| | Free Comic Book Day: Aliens/Predator, Aliens Day Edition | May 2009 | Story is untitled. Issue also features a Predator and an Alien/Predator story. |
| "Inhuman Condition" | Dark Horse Presents (vol. 2) #12–17 | May – October 2012 | Six-part story. |
| "In Space No One Can Hear You Slay" | Free Comic Book Day and Buffy the Vampire Slayer Season 9 / The Guild: Beach'd | May 2012 | Crossover story with Buffy the Vampire Slayer. |
| "Field Report" | Dark Horse Presents (vol. 3) #2 | September 2014 | |
| "Extravehicular" | Free Comic Book Day 2016: General | May 2016 | |

== Marvel Comics ==
| Title | Series | Issues | Publication date | Notes |
|---|---|---|---|---|
| Alien | 1 | #1–12 | May 2021 – July 2022 | |
| Aliens: Aftermath | | #1 | September 2021 | Epilogue to the 1986 film Aliens. |
| Alien Annual | | #1 | September 2022 | |
| Alien | 2 | #1–6 | November 2022 – April 2023 | |
| Alien | 3 | #1–5 | June 2023 – October 2023 | |
| Alien Annual | | #1 | December 2023 | |
| Alien | 4 | #1–4 | January 2024 – April 2024 | |
| Alien: Black, White & Blood | | #1–4 | April 2024 – July 2024 | Anthology series. |
| Aliens: What If...? | | #1–5 | May 2024 – September 2024 | |
| Aliens vs. Avengers | | #1–4 | October 2024 – June 2025 | Crossover event with Avengers. |
| Alien: Romulus | | #1 | December 2024 | Prologue to the 2024 film Alien: Romulus. |
| Alien: Paradiso | | #1-5 | December 2024 - April 2025 | |
| Alien vs. Captain America | | #1–4 | November 2025 – February 2026 | Crossover event with Captain America. |
| Alien: King Killer | | #1-5 | April 2026 - August 2026 | |
| Alien vs. X-Men | | #1- | September 2026 - | Crossover event with X-Men |

== Other ==
| Story title | Issue | Publication date | Notes |
|---|---|---|---|
| "Do Aliens Dream?" | Skeleton Crew magazine (vol. 2) #2 | July 1990 | Published by Argus House. |
| "Crusade" | Aliens magazine (vol. 2) #13–20 | July 1993 – February 1994 | Only the first eight parts were published. The last two parts were supposed to be published in issues #21–22, but were delayed to issues #23–24 which were cancelled. Aliens: The Original Years Omnibus Vol. 2 by Marvel printed the final issues in January 2022. |

=== Cancelled stories and titles ===
| Title | Original publication date | Notes |
|---|---|---|
| "Matrix" in Aliens magazine (vol. 2) #25 | July 1994 | An illustrated novella written by Grant Morrison and illustrated by Chris Cunningham, was solicited for issue #25 of the magazine but was never published due to its cancellation with issue #22. |
| Aliens: Hive Wars | 1998 | Similar to Aliens: Space Marines, the mini-comic series was going to be packaged with the Hive Wars action figure line by Kenner Toys. |
| Star Trek: The Next Generation/Aliens: Acceptable Losses | April 2017 | Announced in October 2016 at MCM London Comic Con as a intercompany crossover between Dark Horse and IDW. The VP of Publishing of Dark Horse, Randy Stradley, later posted on Facebook saying that the title was cancelled. |
| Aliens: Colonial Marines – Rising Threat #1–8 | September 2019 – April 2020 | Cancelled eight issue limited series serving as tie-in to Aliens: Fireteam Elite by Cold Iron Studios, due to allegations against the writer of the comic, Brian Wood. |

== Collected editions ==
=== Dark Horse Comics ===
| Title | Collected material | Publication date | Format | ISBN | Notes |
Single volumes
| Aliens: Book One | Aliens (vol. 1) #1–6; Aliens story from Dark Horse Presents #24 | November 1989 | TP | 978-1569711644 | |
| Aliens: Book One | Aliens (vol. 1) #1–6; Aliens story from Dark Horse Presents #24 | June 1990 | HC | 978-1878574084 | |
| Aliens: Book Two | Aliens (vol. 2) #1–4 | September 1990 | HC | 978-1569710319 | 2500-copy Limited Edition. |
| Aliens: Book Two | Aliens (vol. 2) #1–4 | October 1990 | TP | 978-1878574039 | |
| Aliens: Earth War | Aliens: Earth War #1–4 | July 1991 | TP | 978-1878574237 | |
| Aliens: Earth War | Aliens: Earth War #1–4 | December 1991 | HC | 978-1569710326 | |
| Aliens: Genocide | Aliens: Genocide #1–4 | December 1992 | TP | 978-1569711231 | |
| Aliens: Hive | Aliens: Hive #1–4 | February 1993 | TP | 978-1569711224 | |
| Aliens: Rogue | Aliens: Rogue #1–4 | October 1994 | TP | 978-1569710234 | |
| Aliens: Labyrinth | Aliens: Labyrinth #1–4; "Backsplash" from Dark Horse Comics #12–13 | August 1995 | TP | 978-1569711101 | |
| Aliens: Stronghold | Aliens: Stronghold #1–4 | July 1996 | TP | 978-1569711545 | |
| Aliens Vol. 1: Outbreak | Aliens (vol. 1) #1–6 | August 1996 | TP | 978-1569711743 | |
| Aliens Vol. 2: Nightmare Asylum | Aliens (vol. 2) #1–4 | October 1996 | TP | 978-1569712177 | |
| Aliens Vol. 3: Female War | Aliens: Earth War #1–4 | December 1996 | TP | 978-1569711903 | |
| Aliens Vol. 4: Genocide | Aliens: Genocide #1–4 | February 1997 | TP | 978-1569711965 | |
| Aliens Vol. 5: Harvest | Aliens: Hive #1–4 | February 1998 | TP | 978-1569711989 | |
| Aliens Vol. 6: Rogue | Aliens: Rogue #1–4 | August 1997 | TP | 978-1569712672 | |
| Aliens Vol. 7: Labyrinth | Aliens: Labyrinth #1–4; "Backsplash" from Dark Horse Comics #12–13 | March 1997 | TP | 978-1569712450 | |
| Aliens Vol. 8: Stronghold | Aliens: Stronghold #1–4 | July 1997 | TP | 978-1569712627 | |
| Aliens: Kidnapped | Aliens: Kidnapped #1–3; "Cargo" from Dark Horse Comics #15–16 | February 1999 | TP | 978-1569713723 | |
| Aliens: Apocalypse – The Destroying Angels | Aliens: Apocalypse- The Destroying Angels #1–4 | October 1999 | TP | 978-1569713990 | |
| Aliens: Salvation and Sacrifice | Aliens: Salvation; Aliens: Sacrifice | March 2001 | TP | 978-1569715611 | |
| Aliens: More than Human | Aliens (vol. 3) #1–4 | April 2010 | TP | 978-1595824905 | |
| Prometheus: Fire and Stone | Prometheus: Fire and Stone #1–4 | April 2015 | TP | 978-1616556501 | |
| Aliens: Fire and Stone | Aliens: Fire and Stone #1–4; "Field Report" from Dark Horse Presents (vol. 3) #2 | May 2015 | TP | 978-1616556556 | |
| Aliens: Salvation | Alien: Salvation | September 2015 | HC | 978-1616557553 | |
| Prometheus: The Complete Fire and Stone | Prometheus: Fire and Stone #1–4; Aliens: Fire and Stone #1–4; Alien vs. Predator: Fire and Stone #1–4; Predator: Fire and Stone #1–4; Prometheus: Fire and Stone – Omega | October 2015 | HC | 978-1616557720 | |
| Aliens: Defiance Vol. 1 | Aliens: Defiance #1–6; "Extravehicular" from Free Comic Book Day 2016: General | January 2017 | TP | 978-1506701264 | |
| Prometheus: Life and Death | Prometheus: Life and Death #1–4 | January 2017 | TP | 978-1506701035 | |
| Aliens: Life and Death | Aliens: Life and Death #1–4 | April 2017 | TP | 978-1506701257 | |
| Aliens: Defiance Vol. 2 | Aliens: Defiance #7–12 | September 2017 | TP | 978-1506701684 | |
| Aliens: Dead Orbit | Aliens: Dead Orbit #1–4 | March 2018 | TP | 978-1506703336 | |
| Aliens: Dead Orbit | Aliens: Dead Orbit #1–4 | April 2019 | HC | 978-1506709925 | |
| Aliens: Dust to Dust | Aliens: Dust to Dust #1–4 | May 2019 | TP | 978-1506707921 | |
| Aliens: Resistance | Aliens: Resistance #1–4 | August 2019 | TP | 978-1506711263 | |
| Aliens: Defiance Library Edition | Aliens: Defiance #1–12; "Extravehicular" from Free Comic Book Day 2016: General | October 2019 | HC | 978-1506714585 | |
| Aliens: Rescue | Aliens: Rescue #1–4 | January 2020 | TP | 978-1506711270 | |
| Alien: The Original Screenplay | Alien: The Original Screenplay #1–5 | December 2020 | HC | 978-1506717661 | |
Collections
| Dark Horse Presents: Aliens | "Theory of Alien Propagation" from Dark Horse Presents #24, "Part One: Advent" and "Part Two: Terminus" 42–43, "The Alien" 56; "Reapers" from Dark Horse Presents Fifth Anniversary Special | 1992 | TP | | Issue has a Platinum Edition variant. |
| Aliens Omnibus Vol. 1 | Aliens (vol. 1) #1–6; Aliens (vol. 2) #1–4; Aliens: Earth War #1–4; "Theory of Alien Propagation" from Dark Horse Presents (vol. 1) #24; "The Alien" from Dark Horse Presents (vol. 1) #56 | July 2007 | TP | 978-1593077273 | |
| Aliens Omnibus Vol. 2 | Aliens: Genocide #1–4; Aliens: Hive #1–4; Aliens: Colonial Marines #1–10 | December 2007 | TP | 978-1593078287 | |
| Aliens Omnibus Vol. 3 | Aliens: Rogue #1–4; Aliens: Sacrifice; Aliens: Labyrinth #1–4; Aliens: Salvation; "Advent" and "Terminus" from Dark Horse Presents (vol. 1) #42–43; "Reapers" from Dark Horse Presents Fifth Anniversary Special; "Horror Show" from Dark Horse Comics #3–5 | March 2008 | TP | 978-1593078720 | |
| Aliens Omnibus Vol. 4 | Aliens: Music of the Spears #1–4; Aliens: Stronghold #1–4; Aliens: Berserker #1–4; Aliens: Mondo Heat; "The Taste" from Dark Horse Comics #11; "Mondo Pest" from Dark Horse Comics #22–24 | July 2008 | TP | 978-1593079260 | |
| Aliens Omnibus Vol. 5 | Aliens: Alchemy #1–3; Aliens: Kidnapped #1–3; "Cargo" from Dark Horse Comics #15–16; Aliens: Survival #1–3; "Alien" from Dark Horse Comics #17–19; Aliens: Earth Angel; "Incubation" from Dark Horse Presents #101–102; Aliens: Havoc #1–2; Aliens: Lovesick; "Lucky" from A Decade of Dark Horse #3 | October 2008 | TP | 978-1593079918 | |
| Aliens Omnibus Vol. 6 | Aliens: Xenogenesis #1–4; "Headhunters" from Dark Horse Presents #117; "Tourist Season" from Dark Horse Presents Annual 1997; Aliens: Pig; "Borderlines" from Dark Horse Presents #121; Aliens Special; Aliens: Purge; Aliens: Glass Corridor; Aliens: Stalker; Aliens: Wraith; "Once in a Lifetime" from Dark Horse Presents #140 | December 2008 | TP | 978-1595822147 | |
| Aliens: The Original Comics Series Vol. 1 | Aliens (vol. 1) #1–6 | April 2016 | HC | 978-1506700786 | |
| Aliens: The Original Comics Series Vol. 2 | Aliens (vol. 2) #1–4; Aliens: Earth War #1–4 | April 2017 | HC | 978-1506703565 | |
| Aliens: The Essential Comics Vol. 1 | Aliens (vol. 1) #1–6; Aliens (vol. 2) #1–4; Aliens: Earth War #1–4 | October 2018 | TP | 978-1506710037 | |

=== Marvel Comics ===
| Title | # | Volume | Collected material | Publication date | Format | ISBN | Notes |
Collections
| Alien | 1 | Bloodlines | Alien #1–6 | October 2021 | TP | 978-1302926144 | |
| Alien | 2 | Revival | Alien #7–12 | August 2022 | TP | 978-1302926151 | |
Reprints
| Aliens: The Original Years Omnibus | 1 | | Aliens (vol. 1) #1–6; Aliens (vol. 2) #1–4; Aliens: Earth War #1–4; Aliens: Genocide #1–4; Aliens: Hive #1–4; Aliens: Tribes; Aliens: Newt's Tale #1–2; Alien 3 #1–3; Aliens: Space Marines #1–12; "Countdown" from Dark Horse Insider #14–27; "Theory of Alien Propagation" from Dark Horse Presents #24, "Part One: Advent" and "Part Two: Terminus" from 42–43, "The Alien" from 56; "Reapers" from Dark Horse Presents Fifth Anniversary Special | May 19, 2021 | HC | 978-1302928155 978-1302928162 (variant cover) | |
| Aliens: The Original Years Omnibus | 2 | | Aliens: Rogue #1–4; Aliens: Colonial Marines #1–10; Aliens: Labyrinth #1–4; Aliens: Salvation; Aliens: Music of the Spears #1–4; Aliens: Stronghold #1–4; "Horror Show" from Dark Horse Comics #3–5, "The Taste" from 11, "Backsplash" from 12–13, "Cargo" from 15–16, "Alien" from 17–19; "Earth Angel" from Previews (vol. 3) #1–12 and (vol. 4) #1; "Sacrifice" and "Crusade" from Aliens magazine (vol. 2) #9–20 | January 11, 2022 | HC | 978-1302928902 978-1302928919 (variant cover) | |
| Aliens: The Original Years Omnibus | 3 | | Aliens: Berserker #1–4; Aliens: Mondo Heat #1; Aliens: Lovesick #1; Aliens: Pig #1; Aliens Special #1; Aliens: Havoc #1–2; Aliens: Purge #1; Aliens: Alchemy #1–3; Alien Resurrection #1–2; Aliens: Kidnapped #1–3; Aliens: Survival #1–3; Aliens: Glass Corridor #1; Aliens: Stalker #1; Aliens: Wraith #1; Aliens: Apocalypse – The Destroying Angels #1–4; Aliens: Xenogenesis #1–4; Aliens #1–4; "Mondo Pest" from Dark Horse Comics #22–24; "Incubation" from Dark Horse Presents #101–102, "Borderlines" from #121, "Once in a Lifetime" from #140; "Tourist Season" from Dark Horse Presents Annual 1997; "Lucky" from A Decade of Dark Horse #3; Aliens story from Free Comic Book Day 2009: Aliens #1 | September 20, 2022 | HC | 978-1302928926 978-1302928933 (variant cover) | |
| Aliens: The Original Years Omnibus | 4 | | Aliens: Fast Track to Heaven; Aliens: Colonial Marines – No Man Left Behind #1; Alien: Isolation #1; Aliens: Defiance #1–12; Aliens: Dead Orbit #1–4; Aliens: Dust to Dust #1–4; William Gibson's Alien 3 #1–5; Aliens: Resistance #1–4; Aliens: Rescue #1–4; Alien: The Original Screenplay #1–5; "Inhuman Condition" from Dark Horse Presents (vol. 2) #12–17; "Extravehicular" from Free Comic Book Day 2016: Aliens #1 | January 24, 2023 | HC | 978-1302928940 978-1302928957 (variant cover) | |

== See also ==
- List of Alien (franchise) novels
- List of Predator (franchise) comics
- Aliens vs. Predator (comics)
- List of comics based on films
