= List of Predator (franchise) comics =

The Predator comic books are part of the Predator franchise and has had several titles published based on the license, most of which are part of the Dark Horse Comics line (Dark Horse also publishes the Aliens and Alien vs. Predator lines of comics) but other comics by other distributors have been made. All Predator solo comics, not counting crossovers like Fire and Stone, were set on Earth in either the present or past until Marvel´s 2022 reboot moved the setting for the first time from Earth and into the future. Some continuity was retained due to the return of John Schaefer.

== Dark Horse Comics ==
Title	Issues	Creative team	Cover dates	Notes
Limited series
Predator	#1–4	Mark Verheiden; Chris Warner; Ron Randall	June 1989 – March 1990	Also known as Predator: Concrete Jungle; Set during a blistering heat wave in New York, as police begin to discover evidence of a sadistic killer, Detective John Schaefer, the brother of Dutch Schaefer (Arnold Schwarzenegger) from the first Predator film, quickly learns it is the extraterrestrial hunters, drawn by the heat and the prey. The later video game Predator: Concrete Jungle by Eurocom borrowed the title from the comics but chose an entirely different story arc for the game.
Predator 2	#1–2	Franz Henkel; Dan Barry; Mark Bright; Randy Emberlin; Ron Randall	February – June 1991	Comic book adaptation of the film Predator 2. Original screenplay by Jim and John Thomas.
Predator: Big Game	#1–4	John Arcudi; Evan Dorkin; Armando Gil	March – June 1991	
Predator: The Bloody Sands of Time	#1–2	Dan Barry; Mike Richardson; Chris Warner	February 1992	
Predator: Cold War	#1–4	Mark Verheiden; Ron Randall; Steve Mitchell	September – December 1991	Part written sequel to Predator: Concrete Jungle. When a Predator spacecraft crashlands in the isolated Northern tundra of Siberia, John Schaefer is called upon once again to aid the US military in capturing the technology. Unfortunately, the Russian forces have their eyes on the craft as well.
Predator: Race War	#0–4	Andrew Vachss; Randy Stradley; Jordan Raskin; Lauchland Pelle; Rick Bryant	February – October 1993	Issue 0 was published between issues 2 and 3. Black and white prison gangs unite to kill a Predator who's killing members of both.
Predator: Bad Blood	#1–4	Evan Dorkin; Derek Thompson; Chris Warner; Keith Aiken	December 1993 – June 1994	
Predator: Dark River	#1–4	Mark Verheiden; Ron Randall; Rick Magyar	July – October 1996	
Predator: Kindred	#1–4	Scott Tolson; Brian Kalin O'Connell; Bruce Patterson; Dave Nestelle	December 1996 – January 1997	
Predator: Hell & Hot Water	#1–3	Mark Schultz; Gene Colan; Gregory Wright	April – June 1997	The crew of a Peruvian fishing boat encounter a Predator visiting Earth to hunt dangerous aquatic life.
Predator: Primal	#1–2	Kevin J. Anderson; Scott Kolins; John Lowe	July – August 1997	
Predator: Nemesis	#1–2	Gordon Rennie; Colin MacNeil	December 1997 – January 1998	
Predator: Hell Come A-Walkin'	#1–2	Nancy A. Collins; Dean Ormston	February – March 1998	Set during the Civil War, the men of the northern and southern armies unite to stop a Predator that's stalking and killing men from both sides.
Predator: Homeworld	#1–4	James Vance; Kate Worley; Toby Cypress; Mark Lipka	March – June 1999	
Predator: Xenogenesis	#1–4	Ian Edginton; Mel Rubi; Andrew Pepoy	August – November 1999	
Predator	#1–4	John Arcudi; Javier Saltares; Walden Wong	June 2009 – January 2010	Also known as Predator: Prey to the Heavens.
Predators	#1–4	David Lapham; Marc Andreyko; Gabriel Guzman; Guilherme Balbi; Mariano Taibo	June 2010	Prequel comic series to the 2010 film Predators.
Predator: Fire and Stone	#1–4	Joshua Williamson; Christopher Mooneyham; John Lucas	October 2014 – January 2015	Fire and Stone crossover event tie-in.
Predator: Life and Death	#1–4	Dan Abnett; Brian Thies	March – June 2016	Life and Death crossover event tie-in.
Predator: Hunters	#1–5	Chris Warner; Francisco Ruiz Velasco; Mike Heisler	May – September 2017	This trilogy features surviving characters from previous stories in a rare use of continuity. Such as Enoch Nakai from Big Game.
Predator: Hunters II	#1–4	Chris Warner; Agustin Padilla; Neeraj Menon; Mike Heisler	August 2018 – January 2019	
Predator: Hunters III	#1–2	Chris Warner; Brian Thies; Wes Dzioba	February – March 2020	Only two of the four planned issues were released. All four were collected in the trade paperback.
One-shots
Predator: Invaders from the Fourth Dimension	#1	Jerry Prosser; Jim Somerville; Brian Garvey	July 1994	
Predator: Jungle Tales		Ian Edginton; Rick Leonardi; Dan Panosian	March 1995	
Predator: Strange Roux		Brian McDonald; Mitch Byrd; Jason Rodriguez	November 1996	
Predator: Captive		Gordon Rennie; Dean Ormston	May 1998	
Predators Film Adaptation		Paul Tobin; Victor Drujinu	July 2010	Comic adaptation of the 2010 film Predators.
Predators: Preserve the Game		David Lapham; Allan Jefferson	July 2010	

=== Crossovers ===
Crossovers with the Alien franchise are in their own separate article.

Title	Issues	Creative team	Cover dates	Co-publisher	Notes
Limited series
Batman versus Predator	#1–3	Dave Gibbons; Andy Kubert; Adam Kubert	January – February 1992	DC Comics	Published in regular and Prestige format concurrently.
Predator versus Magnus Robot Fighter	#1–2	Jim Shooter; John Ostrander; Lee Weeks	November 1992 – May 1993	Valiant Comics	
Batman versus Predator II: Bloodmatch	#1–4	Doug Moench; Paul Gulacy; Terry Austin	December 1994 – March 1995	DC Comics	
Tarzan versus Predator: At the Earth's Core	#1–4	Walt Simonson; Lee Weeks	January – June 1996		Not an intercompany crossover.
Predator versus Judge Dredd	#1–3	John Wagner; Enrique Alcatena	October – December 1997	Fleetway Publications	Also published in Judge Dredd Megazine (vol. 3) #36–38 in the UK.
Batman versus Predator III	#1–4	Chuck Dixon; Rodolfo Damaggio; Robert Campanella	November 1997 – February 1998	DC Comics	
Aliens vs. Predator vs. The Terminator	#1-4	Mark Schultz; Mel Rubi; Christopher Ivy; Dave Stewart	April - July 2000	Dark Horse Comics	
Superman vs. Predator	#1–3	David Michelinie; Alex Maleev	2000	DC Comics	
Archie vs. Predator	#1–4	Alex de Campi; Fernando Ruiz; Rich Koslowski	April – July 2015	Archie Comics	
Archie vs. Predator II	#1–5	Alex de Campi; Robert Hack	September 2019 – March 2020	Archie Comics	
One-shots
The Transformers UK	#284	Simon Furman	August 18 1990	Marvel UK	The cover depicts Starscream being stalked by a mysterious bounty hunter, who was later confirmed to be the Predator.
JLA versus Predator		John Ostrander; Graham Nolan; Randy Elliott	2001	DC Comics	

=== Stories ===
Stories published in other comics unrelated to the Predator franchise.

Title	Issues	Creative team	Cover dates	Notes
"Rite of Passage"	Dark Horse Comics #1–2	Ian Edginton; Rick Leonardi; Dan Panosian	August – September 1992	
"Blood Feud"	Dark Horse Comics #4–7	Neal Barrett Jr.; Leo Durañona	November 1992 – February 1993	
"The Pride at Nghasa"	Dark Horse Comics #10–12	Chuck Dixon; Enrique Alcatena	May – August 1993	
"Bad Blood"	Dark Horse Comics #12–14	Evan Dorkin; Derek Thompson; Ande Parks	August – October 1993	
"The Hunted City"	Dark Horse Comics #16–18	Charles Moore; D. Alexander Gregory; Scott Fischer; Rob Haynes; Jason Rodriguez	December 1993 – February 1994	
"Blood on Two-Witch Mesa"	Dark Horse Comics #20–21	Terry LaBan; Howard Cobb	April – May 1994	
"Hunting the Heroes: Predators Attack!"	Agents of Law #6; Ghost #5; Motorhead #1; X #18		September 1995	This was a story event in which Predators attack heroes of the Dark Horse Heroes comics.
"Predator: 1718"	A Decade of Dark Horse #1	Henry Gilroy; Igor Kordey	July 1996	"Raphael Adolini" is misspelled "Rafael Andolini".

== Marvel Comics ==
Title	Issues	Creative team	Cover dates	Notes
Predator: Day of the Hunter	#1–6	Ed Brisson; Kev Walker	August 2022 – January 2023	First appearance of Theta.
Predator: The Preserve	#1–5	Ed Brisson; Netho Diaz	March – July 2023	
Predator vs. Wolverine	#1–4	Benjamin Percy; Greg Land; Andrea Di Vito; Ken Lashley; Hayden Sherman; Kei Zama; Gavin Guidry	September – December 2023	Crossover event with Wolverine
Predator: The Last Hunt	#1–4	Ed Brisson; Francesco Manna	February – May 2024	Reintroducing a cryogenically frozen John Schaefer in 2168 from the Dark Horse line.
Predator vs. Black Panther	#1–4	Benjamin Percy; Chris Allen; Lee Ferguson; Sean Damien Hill	August – November 2024	Crossover event with Black Panther
Predator vs. Spider-Man	#1–4	Benjamin Percy; Marcelo Ferreira	April – July 2025	Crossover event with Spider-Man
Predator: Black, White & Blood	#1–4	Joe Kelly & Álvaro López; Eliot Rahal & Brian Level; Sarah Gailey & Fran Galán; Curtis Baxter & Acky Bright; Rebecca Roanhorse	July – October 2025	Anthology series
Predator Kills the Marvel Universe	#1–5	Benjamin Percy; Marcelo Ferreira	August – December 2025	Crossover event with the Marvel Universe
Predator: Badlands	#1	Ethan Sacks; Elvin Ching	November 2025	Prologue to the 2025 film Predator: Badlands.
Predator: Bloodshed	#1-5	Jordan MNorris; Roland Boschi	February 2026 - June 2026	

== Publications ==
The details of the publication of the comics and trade paperbacks include:

- Predator: Concrete Jungle (by Mark Verheiden and Chris Warner, Dark Horse, 112 pages, 1990, ISBN 1-56971-165-8)
- Predator: Big Game (by John Arcudi, Evan Dorkin and Armando Gil, Titan Books, 112 pages, 1992, ISBN 1-85286-454-0, Dark Horse, 1996, ISBN 1-56971-166-6)
- Predator: The Bloody Sands of Time (by Dan Barry and Chris Warner, 2-issue mini-series, 1992)
- Predator: Cold War (by Mark Verheiden, Ron Randall and Steve Mitchell, Dark Horse, 112 pages, 1993, Titan Books, 104 pages, 1995, ISBN 1-85286-576-8)
- Predator: Race War (by Andrew Vachss and Randy Stradley, Dark Horse, 144 pages, 1995, ISBN 1-56971-112-7)
- Predator: Kindred (by Scott R. Tolson and Jason Lamb, Penciller: Brian O'Connell, Roger Peterson and Inker: Bruce Patterson, 4-issue mini-series, 1996, tpb, 1997, ISBN 1-56971-270-0)
- Predator: Dark River (by Mark Verheiden, pencils by Ron Randall and inks by Rick Magyar, 4-issue mini-series, 1996)
- Predator: Hell & Hot Water (by Mark Schultz and Gene Colan, 3-issue mini-series, 1997, tpb, 1998, ISBN 1-56971-271-9)
- Predator: Primal (by Kevin J. Anderson, Penciller: Scott Kolins and Inker: John Lowe, 2-issue mini-series, 1997)
- Predator: Nemesis (by Gordon Rennie and Colin MacNeil, two-issue mini-series, 1997)
- Predator: Hell Come a Walkin (by Nancy A. Collins and Dean Ormston, two-issue mini-series, 1998)
- Predator: Captive (by Gordon Rennie and Dean Ormston, one-shot, May 1998)
- Predator: Xenogenesis (by Ian Edginton, Mel Rubi (pencils) and Andrew Pepoy (inks), for Dark Horse, 1999)
- Predators (2010, Dark Horse Comics)
- Predator: Fire and Stone (2014-2015, Dark Horse Comics)
- Predator: Life and Death (2016, Dark Horse Comics)
- Predator: Hunters (2017, Dark Horse Comics)
- Predator 30th Anniversary: The Original Comics Series (2017, Dark Horse Comics)
- Predator: Hunters II (2018-2019, Dark Horse Comics)
- Predator: The Essential Comics Volume 1 (2018, Dark Horse Comics)
- Predator: Hunters III (2020, Dark Horse Comics)

== Collected editions ==
- Predator Omnibus Volume 1 (collects Concrete Jungle, Cold War, Dark River, Rite Of Passage, The Pride at Nghasa, The Bloody Sands Of Time, and Blood Feud, 430 pages, August 2007, ISBN 1-59307-732-7)
- Predator Omnibus Volume 2 (collects Big Game, God's Truth (from Dark Horse Presents 46), Race War, The Hunted City (from Dark Horse Comics 16-19), Blood on Two-Witch Mesa (from Dark Horse Comics 20-21), Invaders from the Fourth Dimension, and 1718 (from A Decade of Dark Horse 1), 360 pages, February 2008, ISBN 1-59307-733-5)
- Predator Omnibus Volume 3 (collects Bad Blood (including Dark Horse Comics 12-14), Kindred, Hell and Hot Water, Strange Roux, No Beast so Fierce (from Dark Horse Presents 119), and Bump in the Night (from Dark Horse Presents 124), 344 pages, June 2008, ISBN 1-59307-925-7)
- Predator Omnibus Volume 4 (collects Primal, Nemesis, Homeworld, Xenogenesis, Hell Come a Walkin', Captive, and Demon's Gold, 352 pages, October 2008, ISBN 1-59307-990-7)

== See also ==
- List of Alien (franchise) comics
- List of Predator (franchise) novels
- List of Alien vs. Predator (franchise) comics
- List of comics based on films
- Prey, in which Raphael Adolini of Predator: 1718 is loosely adapted.

== Sources ==
- Beautiful Monsters: The Unofficial and Unauthorised Guide to the Alien and Predator Films (by David A. McIntee, Telos, 272 pages, 2005, ISBN 1-903889-94-4)
