= Aliens (Dark Horse Comics line) =

Comic book line

- Cover of Aliens Book One: Outbreak

Publication information
- Publisher: Dark Horse Comics
- Format: Comic book limited series and one-shots
- Publication date: 1988
- Main character(s): Rebecca "Newt" Jorden; Corporal Dwayne Hicks; Ellen Ripley; Weyland-Yutani

Aliens is a line of several comic books set in the fictional universe of the Alien films published by Dark Horse Comics from 1988 forward. The stories often feature the company Weyland-Yutani and the United States Colonial Marines. Originally intended as a sequel to James Cameron's 1986 film Aliens, the first mini-series features the characters of Rebecca "Newt" Jorden and Corporal Dwayne Hicks. Later series also included the further adventures of Ellen Ripley, with other stories being unique to the Alien universe and are often used to explore other aspects of the species, such as their sociology and biology, and also tying into Dark Horse Comics' Predator and Aliens vs. Predator lines. The novels by Titan Books also crossed over with the comics leading to some shared continuity.

== Concept ==
The heads of Dark Horse Comics made a decision early on to not publish ongoing or unlimited titles from the license and compose the line as a series of limited series, one-shots and short stories with a main focus on limited series because they believed that it would allow more creative freedom and flexibility for the writers and artists. 2011´s Aliens: Fast Track to Heaven is the only graphic novella to have come out under Dark Horse. The first nine of the Alien novels, published between 1992 and 1998, were all comic adaptations.

== History ==
The first three stories formed a continuation of the two Alien films that had been released by the time they were published. However, 1992 saw the release of Alien 3, which contradicted the events of the comics by beginning with the deaths of Newt and Corporal Hicks. In order to keep the stories relevant to the main Alien film series, Dark Horse changed the names of the characters for future printings of the stories. Newt became Billie while Hicks was now known as Wilks. The only other major difference between the original publications is that as well as being renamed the trade paperbacks were also recolored.

Between 1999 and 2008 the line was on hiatus.

In 2020, the comic rights to the Aliens franchise were sold to Marvel Comics, ending the Dark Horse Comics line. As well as producing their own original comics, Marvel have the right to reprint at least some of the previous Dark Horse stories, and as of 2022 several have been republished in new collections and/or as digital comics.

== Publications ==
Dark Horse has produced a number of Aliens comic books and collected volumes:

=== Initial works ===
- Aliens 1–6 (also known as Aliens: Book One and Aliens: Outbreak, by Mark Verheiden and Mark A. Nelson, 1989)
- Aliens 1–4 (also known as Aliens Book 2 and Nightmare Asylum, by Mark Verheiden, Denis Beauvais and Mark A. Nelson, 1990)
- Aliens: Earth War 1–4 (also known as Aliens Book 3 and Female War, by Mark Verheiden and Sam Kieth, 176 pages, 1991)
- Aliens: Hive (also known as Harvest, by Jerry Prosser and Kelley Jones, 1993)
- Aliens: Rogue (by Ian Edginton and Will Simpson, 1993, 1994)
- Aliens: Earth Angel (one-shot, August 1994)
- Aliens: Berserker (4-issue limited series, January–April 1995)
- Aliens: Labyrinth (by Jim Woodring and Kilian Plunkett, 1995)
- Aliens: Incubation (published in Dark Horse Presents Volume 1 #101 and Dark Horse Presents Volume 1 #102, September–October 1995)
- Aliens: Mondo Heat (one-shot, February 1996)
- Aliens: Lucky (published in A Decade of Dark Horse #3, short story, September 1996)
- Aliens: Lovesick (one-shot, December 1996)
- Aliens: Headhunters (published in Dark Horse Presents Volume 1 #117, short story, January 1997)
- Aliens: Pig (by Chuck Dixon, Henry Flint (pencils) and Andrew Pepoy (inks), one-shot, March 1997)
- Aliens: Border Lines (published in Dark Horse Presents Volume 1 #121, short story, May 1997)
- Aliens: Special (one-shot, June 1997)
  - Aliens: 45 Seconds
  - Aliens: Elder Gods
- Aliens: Havoc (2-issue limited series, June 1997)
- Aliens: Genocide (by John Arcudi, Damon Willis and Karl Stor, tpb, 112 pages, 1997)
- Aliens: Purge (by Ian Edginton, Phil Hester (pencils) and Ande Parks (inks), one-shot, August 1997)
- Aliens: Alchemy (3-issue limited series, September 1997)
- Aliens: Kidnapped (3-issue limited series, December 1997)
- Aliens: Tourist Season (published in Dark Horse Presents Annual 1997, February 1998)
- Aliens: Survival (February 1998)
- Aliens: Glass Corridor (June 1998)
- Aliens: Stalker (June 1998)
- Aliens: Wraith (July 1998)
- Aliens: Apocalypse: The Destroying Angels (by Mark Schultz and Doug Wheatley, 4-issue limited-series, 1999)
- Aliens: Once in a Lifetime (published in Dark Horse Presents Volume 1 #140, February 1999)
- Aliens (Free Comic Book Day 2009) (May 2009)
- Aliens / Aliens: More Than Human (2009)
- Aliens: Fast Track to Heaven (November 2011)
- Aliens: Inhuman Condition (2012)
- Aliens: Colonial Marines - No Man Left Behind (July 2012)
- Alien: Isolation (July 2014)
- Aliens: Field Report (short story, published in Dark Horse Presents Volume 3 #2, September 2014)
- Aliens 30th Anniversary: The Original Comics Series (April 2016)
- Aliens: Defiance (12-issue limited series, April 2016)
- Aliens: Defiance (short story, published in Free Comic Book Day 2016: Serenity, May 2016)

=== Collected editions ===
Aliens Omnibus collection series:

- Volume 1 (collects Outbreak, Nightmare Asylum, Female War, Theory of Alien Propagation, and The Alien, 384 pages, July 2007, ISBN 1-59307-727-0)
- Volume 2 (collects Genocide, Harvest and Colonial Marines, 448 pages, December 2007, ISBN 1-59307-828-5)
- Volume 3 (collects Rogue, Sacrifice, Labyrinth, Salvation, Advent/Terminus, Reapers, and Horror Show, 376 pages, March 2008, ISBN 1-59307-872-2)
- Volume 4 (collects Music of the Spears, Stronghold, Frenzy, Taste, Mondo Pest, and Mondo Heat, 376 pages, July 2008, ISBN 1-59307-926-5)
- Volume 5 (collects Alchemy, Kidnapped, Cargo, Survival, Alien, Earth Angel, Incubation, Havoc, Lovesick, and Lucky, 364 pages, November 2008, ISBN 1-59307-991-5)
- Volume 6 (collects Apocalypse, Once in a Lifetime, Xenogenesis, Headhunters, Tourist Season, Pig, Border Lines, 45 Seconds, Elder Gods, Purge, Glass Corridor, Stalker, and Wraith, 376 Pages, December 2008, ISBN 1-59582-214-3)

Aliens The Original Comics Series collection series:

- Aliens The Original Comics Series: 30th Anniversary (collects Outbreak, 184 pages, April 28, 2016, ISBN 1-5067-0078-0)
- Nightmare Asylum and Earth War (224 pages, April 27, 2017, ISBN 1-5067-0356-9)

Aliens The Essential Comics collection series:

- Volume 1 (collects Outbreak, Nightmare Asylum and Earth War, 368 pages, October 24, 2018, ISBN 1-5067-1003-4)
- Volume 2 (collects Salvation, Labyrinth, Sacrifice, Harvest, Reapers and Taste, 416 pages, was due for release August 27, 2020 but cancelled due to the Covid-19 pandemic and Disney buying the Aliens license, ISBN 1-5067-1817-5)

Aliens: The Original Years Omnibus collection series:

- Volume 1 (collects Aliens (1988), Aliens (1989), Earth War, Genocide, Hive, Tribes, Newt's Tale, Alien 3, Space Marines, Dark Horse Presents (1986) #24, #42-43, #56, Dark Horse Presents Fifth Anniversary Special (1991) #1, Dark Horse Insider (1989) #14-27, 1,032 pages, 13 April 2021, ISBN 1-302-92815-5)
- Volume 2 (collects Colonial Marines, Rogue, Labyrinth, Salvation, Music of the Spears, Stronghold, Dark Horse Comics (1992) #3-5, #11-13, #15-19, Previews (1993) #1-12, Previews (1994) #1, Aliens Magazine (1992, UK) #9-20, 1,000 pages, 31 August 2021)

There have been other comic crossovers published by Dark Horse which are not part of the line as well as a few Alien comics not by Dark Horse.

=== Dark Horse Presents ===
Aliens also appeared in the following "Dark Horse Presents" and "Dark Horse Comics" magazines.

- Dark Horse Presents Vol.1 #24
- Dark Horse Presents Vol.1 #42
- Dark Horse Presents Vol.1 #43
- Dark Horse Presents Vol.1 #56
- Dark Horse Presents Vol.1 #101
- Dark Horse Presents Vol.1 #102
- Dark Horse Presents Vol.1 #117
- Dark Horse Presents Vol.1 #121
- Dark Horse Presents Vol.1 #140
- Dark Horse Presents Vol.2 #12
- Dark Horse Presents Vol.2 #13
- Dark Horse Presents Vol.2 #14
- Dark Horse Presents Vol.2 #15
- Dark Horse Presents Vol.2 #16
- Dark Horse Presents Vol.2 #17
- Dark Horse Presents Vol.3 #2
- Dark Horse Insider #14-#27
- Dark Horse Presents Fifth Anniversary Special 1991
- Dark Horse Presents Annual 1997
- Dark Horse - A Decade of Dark Horse #3
- Dark Horse - Free comic book day 2009
- Dark Horse Comics #1
- Dark Horse Comics #2
- Dark Horse Comics #3
- Dark Horse Comics #4
- Dark Horse Comics #5
- Dark Horse Comics #11
- Dark Horse Comics #12
- Dark Horse Comics #13
- Dark Horse Comics #15
- Dark Horse Comics #16
- Dark Horse Comics #17
- Dark Horse Comics #18
- Dark Horse Comics #19

== Story summary ==
=== Outbreak ===
Outbreak starts 10 years after the events of Aliens. Ripley's fate is not revealed to the reader, but Hicks and Newt have been struggling with the aftermath of their encounter with the Xenomorphs. Newt is in a mental institution suffering horrible recurring nightmares, and when nothing seems to help her, the doctors decide to wipe her memory. The badly-scarred Hicks, facing constant fears from his fellow Marines that he is somehow contaminated by the Aliens, has never gotten over the annihilation of his squad, and so agrees to go on a mission to the alien homeworld to recover some eggs and to destroy one of the hives (the hive-destroying serves no purpose other than to satisfy Hicks' hatred). Hicks goes to visit Newt before he departs, only to learn about the planned memory-wipe. Hicks believes Newt to be the only thing that marks his existence and honors his squad's sacrifice, so he extracts her from the institution and smuggles her on board the ship flying to the homeworld. Said ship departs, but is trailed by another, crewed by corporate mercenaries intent on keeping the Aliens' secrets for their paymasters.

Meanwhile, strange things are happening on Earth. A scientific corporation has acquired an alien queen, and begins harvesting eggs, intent on creating bio-weapons. A weird cult that believes the Aliens to be God's spiritual rebirth breaks in and its members voluntarily give themselves up for facehugging. They spread the Alien infection across the planet and Earth is soon overrun.

While traveling to the home world, Newt falls in love with a Marine named Butler. Arriving in orbit the home world, their ship is boarded and taken over by the mercenaries, thanks to the assistance of the squad's traitorous leader, who promptly is executed by the mercenaries' amoral leader Massey. Newt is overlooked in this process, and hides in the ship's ventilation shafts. The squad is sent by the mercenaries towards the hive with the intent of having them infected with Alien facehuggers to allow for further research, but the mercenaries are forced into the hive themselves when attacked by another hostile species on the planet, this one capable of flight. The squad gathers weapons, and go into the hive to rescue their surviving attackers. The casualties taken during this operation reveal why they undertook this course of action: they are all unknowing synthetic humans, created and trained to be utterly expendable cannon-fodder, but nevertheless installed with an overpowering instinct to save human life.

Back on the ship, Newt kills Massey, but is distraught to learn that Butler, while surviving being torn in half, is one of the synthetics. Hicks almost kills them all by waiting until he has planted the nest-destroying charges before taking off, but they receive last-minute Alien-killing assistance from a living "Space Jockey", a member of the enigmatic species who originally built and launched the derelict ship whose cargo of eggs led to humanity's first encounter with the Aliens. Newt is able to receive terrifying and cryptic psychic messages from the Jockey. Hicks and Newt receive word of the Alien invasion of Earth, but decide to return home anyway, accompanied by the Jockey in his/its own ship. Upon arrival, they are told by a general that Earth's armed forces are abandoning the planet, planning to return once the Alien infestation has run its course and repopulate. There is a mass exodus from Earth, most of the survivors being military. Hicks, Newt and Butler join this flight, commandeering one of the fleet's many uncrewed cargo ships. The Jockey remains behind in orbit; as she departs, Newt receives a final psychic warning that any returning humans will find it still there, waiting.

=== Nightmare Asylum ===
Script by Mark Verheiden, art and title illustration by Den Beauvais and lettering by Willie Schubert.

The story continues where Outbreak left off, with Newt, the synthetic Butler, and Hicks a short time after having escaped the alien-infested Earth on a cargo ship. The crew discovers the ship is ferrying aliens to an unknown destination. After killing the aliens, the ship autopilots to a military post commanded by General Spears, who is breeding and attempting to train aliens to fight against their own kind on Earth. He is depicted as ruthless, and is called insane by several characters. Throughout the story it is revealed that Spears is extremely paranoid about his own safety and the safety of his aliens, and is willing to sacrifice his own troops without hesitation. As the story progresses, the aliens inevitably escape captivity and begin taking over the military base. Hicks and Newt manage to hide on the same ship General Spears uses to escape. Once aboard the ship Hicks and Newt realize it is full of "trained" aliens that Spears intends on using to take back the infested Earth. The synthetic Butler also manages to send a transmission saying goodbye to Newt as they were separated in the middle of the story. Since Butler is a synthetic and torn in two the aliens do not engage him in any way. Butler is left alone and abandoned in the military base. Before Spears lands on Earth Hicks and Newt jettison out in a small escape pod towards a different space station called Gateway, which becomes a haven for the few people capable of reaching, aware that their chances of survival on Earth are slim. Once Spears lands on Earth he releases his "trained" aliens and expects them to attack the Earth-bred aliens. The "trained" aliens end up turning on Spears. In the end Spears realizes that the aliens were never actually trained, but simply remaining patient throughout their supposed training. The Queen and the other aliens had every intention of getting to Earth and killing Spears. Spears is brutally killed at the end of this realization. On the final page, Ellen Ripley appears, heavily armed, saying the time has come to take the battle to the xenomorphs.

== See also ==
- List of Alien (franchise) novels
- List of Predator (franchise) comics
- List of Alien vs. Predator (franchise) comics
- Aliens versus Predator versus The Terminator
- Mindhunter
- Batman/Aliens
- Green Lantern Versus Aliens
- Judge Dredd vs. Aliens
- Superman/Aliens
- Superman and Batman versus Aliens and Predator
- WildC.A.T.s/Aliens
- Fire and Stone
- List of comics based on films

== Sources ==
- Beautiful Monsters: The Unofficial and Unauthorised Guide to the Alien and Predator Films (by David A. McIntee, Telos, 272 pages, 2005, ISBN 1-903889-94-4)
