= Brian McDonald (screenwriter) =

American screenwriter

- Born: February 18, 1965 (age 61); St. Joseph, Missouri
- Other name: Brian McDonald
- Occupations: Screenwriter, director, teacher, author
- Years active: 1975–current
- Website: http://invisibleinkblog.blogspot.com.au/

Brian Keith McDonald (born February 18, 1965) is an American screenwriter, director, teacher and author, who lives in the state of Washington. McDonald is best known for the books Invisible Ink, The Golden Theme and Ink Spots, and for the short film White Face.

== Early life ==
Brian McDonald was born in St. Joseph, Missouri on February 18, 1965. He was named after his mother's favorite actor, Brian Keith. He has two younger brothers and a younger sister. McDonald lived in Denver, Colorado until the age of seven. After his parents divorced, he moved to Seattle, Washington with his mother.

One of his teachers suggested that he had a learning disability; McDonald learned that he was dyslexic when he was around twenty years old.

As a child, he used a cassette recorder to tape television shows, then watched them repeatedly "to see what made them tick." McDonald made his first film, The War, which featured green plastic Army men in battle, when he was 10 years old.

== Career ==
McDonald started his first film-related job as a teenager around 1979, working for Bruce Walters at a company called Trickfilm in Seattle, making animated titles, motion graphics and effects for commercials. When Walters took a job with Industrial Light and Magic in 1983, McDonald continued working with other Seattle-based animators until he was 21. He interned for Alpha Cine labs, working for Bruce Vecchitto in the FX and title department, and for the Tennesson/Tobin Animation Studio.

In 1986, he moved from Seattle to Los Angeles. His first job in L.A. was with Ted Rae on a movie called Night of the Creeps (1986), working as a runner who assisted in making the Creeps. In 1988 he worked as a fabricator on Dead Heat, Return of the Living Dead Part II, and Night of the Demons. McDonald worked as an animator on The Resurrected, a 1992 horror film, and as a production assistant on Sleepless in Seattle (1993). He also worked on other "creature" movies without gaining screen credits.

At the same time, he was writing speculative screenplays, comic books, and jokes for Ron Pearson, a comedian and old friend. Shortly after, he started working casually as a comedian, doing his own material. McDonald has described himself as "a mediocre stand-up," but credits the experience with teaching him "a ton about audiences and communication."

After seven years of struggling in L.A., juggling jobs in the film, comedy, and comic book writing fields, he returned to Seattle in 1993. There he found work as a screenwriting instructor at the 911 Media Arts Center.

On the "near-demand of a student and the advice of a friend," McDonald wrote a book based on the classes he taught. Completed in 2005, he called it Invisible Ink. When he failed to find a publisher, he handed out copies of the manuscript to students and sent the manuscript to an old friend, Derek Thompson, a story artist at Pixar.

Andrew Stanton, who was working with Thompson, read McDonald's book in one sitting and later said it helped him with Wall-E. He provided a blurb for the book and later suggested to the Pixar University staff that they allow McDonald to teach a class there. Since 2006, McDonald has taught writing classes at Pixar, Disney and Industrial Light and Magic.

In 2001, McDonald directed a mockumentary short film called White Face. It was shown at the 2001 Slamdance Film Festival, where it won the Audience Award for Best Short. He said he made the film as "a work sample," to "show off" his directing and writing skills. It has since run on HBO and Cinemax, been used in corporations across the United States as a Diversity training tool, and is available on DVD. McDonald has also directed several online advertisements for Visa Inc.

In 2002, he was a camera operator on Elixirs & Remedies, a music documentary.

In 2010, the Libertary Company of Seattle (later known as Booktrope), published Invisible Ink and The Golden Theme.

In 2011, Booktrope Editions published Freeman – A Novella in Screenplay Form, and then Ink Spots, a compilation of posts on his The Invisible Ink blog from across a number of years, in 2012. In the same year, McDonald started work with Tom Skerritt and the US Army, as part of the Red Badge program which encouraged US veterans to tell their stories.

== Directing and performing ==
In 2001, Brian McDonald directed a mockumentary short film called White Face. Shortly after, he directed, and appears in, Flickering Memories, a documentary short about Seattle cinemas of the past, for the Seattle International Film Festival of 2004. The film was incorrectly titled Flickering Images by the title-maker, though it is listed correctly by IMDb. Two years later the film was incorporated into a TV series called About Us, under the title Belltown: Flickering Images.

In 2008, he performed in the 20-minute short film Bookie. That film has been since been shown at some two dozen film festivals around the world.

McDonald directed a documentary short called Squirrel Butter and the Tall Boys – Old Time music for MTV in 2009.

== Writing ==
=== Blogs ===
Brian McDonald has been publishing The Invisible Ink Blog since 2005, in which he analyzes great movies and discusses aspects of screenwriting theory.

=== Books ===
In 1995, Brian McDonald was one of the primary contributors to a four volume anthology called Colors in Black (with story pieces in issues 2, 3 and 4), published by Dark Horse Comics in cooperation with Spike Lee, which focused on African-American creators.

In 2001, McDonald contributed the story "The Misadventures of Tommy T-Rex" to the Dark Horse Comics Collection humor anthology book Scatterbrain.

In 2003, on the advice of a student, Brian McDonald compiled his screenwriting notes into a book he called Invisible Ink. Completed in 2005, it was eventually published by Libertary Editions in 2010. By then it was already well known in filmmaking circles and championed by people such as Andrew Stanton, who opened the door for McDonald to teach at Pixar.

In 2010, Libertary Editions also published The Golden Theme: How to Make Your Writing Appeal to the Highest Common Denominator by Brian McDonald.

In 2011, Booktrope Editions (formerly Libertary Editions) published Freeman – A Novella in Screenplay Form. Both Invisible Ink and The Golden Theme were listed on the twenty-six book Recommended Reading List for interns at Pixar in 2012.

=== Comics ===
The first comic books written by Brian McDonald were published in 1989. They were Issue No. 19, Scratchin', and Issue No. 24, Puppy Love, of Caliber Comics' Caliber Presents: Volume One compilation, and were followed by Harry the Cop, No. 1 for Slave Labor Graphics in 1992.

Next came Hardware #9 (1993) and Static No. 40 – Boyz Night Out for Milestone (1996). In the same year he wrote Predator: Strange Roux for Dark Horse Comics, which was republished in 2008 in Predator Omnibus Volume 3.

Brian McDonald wrote Tarzan: The Gorilla Camp Raiders for United Media Syndicate. It was published as a Sunday newspaper comic strip over 14 weeks (Aug 17, 1997, to November 16, 1997). The artist was Gray Morrow.

In 1998, McDonald wrote three volumes of the comic book sequel to the New Line Cinema film Lost in Space (Lost in Space #1, Lost in Space #2 and Lost in Space #3) for Dark Horse Comics. These were later reprinted as a single volume.

He wrote the Hellboy spin-off, Abe Sapien: Drums of the Dead for Dark Horse Comics in the same year.

In 1999, he wrote Aliens vs. Predator: Lefty's Revenge, for Dark Horse Comics. That was republished as part of Aliens vs. Predator Omnibus: Volume 2 (collects Lefty's Revenge, among others). Milwaukie, Oregon, Dark Horse Comics in 2007.

In 2003, Abe Sapien: Drums of the Dead was reprinted in B.P.R.D.: Hollow Earth and Other Stories.

=== Screenplays ===
Brian McDonald has written numerous screenplays. Those produced include the mockumentary short film White Face in 2001, and a thriller feature called Inheritance in 2004.

=== Television ===
Brian McDonald's 2004 film, Flickering Memories, was incorporated into the 2006 TV series, Belltown: Flickering Images.

He wrote episodes 15, 16 and 18 of Season 2 the A+E television show Hoarders in 2010.

== Teaching ==
Since 2003, Brian McDonald has worked as a story consultant at the University of Washington's Animation Capstone, helping produce animated short films.

Andrew Stanton, writer and director of Wall-E and numerous other projects at Pixar, recommended that the Pixar University staff invite Brian McDonald to teach a class there. Since 2006, he has taught writing classes at Pixar, Disney and Industrial Light and Magic.

In 2008, Brian McDonald was guest speaker at the National Speakers Association (NSA) Presentation and Performance Lab, in Las Vegas.

In 2009, he stepped in on short notice, following the sudden death of Blake Snyder, as keynote speaker at the Write on the Sound Writers' Conference, presented by the Edmonds Art Commission.

In 2010, McDonald taught at the Northwest Film Forum Summer Classes.

In 2011, he was interviewed on the subject of Cinematic Storytelling by Warren Etheredge for The Warren Report.

McDonald was a guest lecturer at the National Film Festival for Talented Youth in January 2012. Held in Seattle, Washington, it is the largest youth film festival in the world, and "the premier showcase of the best young directors (aged twenty-two) and younger from around the world." He also taught a short course for Women in Film Seattle.

== Producing ==
Brian McDonald produced White Face in 2001.

In 2004, he co-produced Flickering Memories, a documentary short, which was incorporated into the TV series About Us in 2006 as Belltown: Flickering Images.

In 2004, he also produced a thriller feature called Inheritance.

== Awards and honors ==
Brian McDonald won the Audience Award for Best Short Film at the 2001 Slamdance Film Festival, and a Creative Merit Award at the 2001 Seattle International Film Festival for the short film White Face.

He won the Science Fiction category of the 2006 Austin Film Festival Screenplay Competition for the screenplay Graverobbers.

In 2009, Brian McDonald was a semi-finalist in the Nicholl Fellowship.

== Productions ==
=== Films ===
- 1986 Night of the Creeps – runner
- 1986 Howard Jones – You Know I Love You... Don't You? – animation camera operator
- 1988 Dead Heat – runner and fabricator
- 1988 Return of the Living Dead Part II – runner and fabricator
- 1988 Night of the Demons – runner and fabricator
- 1992 The Resurrected – animator
- 1993 Sleepless in Seattle – production assistant
- 2001 White Face – writer, director, producer
- 2002 Elixirs & Remedies – camera operator
- 2004 Inheritance – writer, producer
- 2004 Flickering Memories – director, performer, producer
- 2008 Bookie – performer
- 2009 Squirrel Butter and the Tall Boys – Old Time music – director

=== Television ===
- 2006 Belltown: Flickering Images – director, performer, producer
- 2010 Hoarders (episodes 15, 16 and 18, Season 2) – writer

=== Books ===
- McDonald, Brian and Purcell, Gordon and Pallot, Terry. Lost in Space. Milwaukie, Oregon, Dark Horse Comics, 1998. ISBN 978-1-56971-341-9
- McDonald, Brian and others. Scatterbrain. Milwaukie, Oregon, Dark Horse Comics, 2001. ISBN 978-1-56971-426-3
- McDonald, Brian. Invisible Ink: A Practical Guide to Building Stories that Resonate. Seattle, WA, Libertary Company, 2010. ISBN 978-0-9841786-2-9
- McDonald, Brian. The Golden Theme: How to make your writing appeal to the highest common denominator. Seattle, WA, Libertary Company, 2010. ISBN 978-0-9841786-7-4
- McDonald, Brian. Freeman – A Novella in Screenplay Form. Seattle, WA, Booktrope Editions, 2011. ISBN 978-1-935961-21-5
- McDonald, Brian. Ink Spots: The Collected Writings of Brian McDonald on Story Structure, Filmmaking and Craftsmanship. Seattle, WA, Booktrope Editions, 2012. ISBN 978-1-935961-75-8
- McDonald, Brian. Land of the Dead, New York, New York, First Second Books (MacMillan), 2023 ISBN 978-1-62672-731-1

=== Comics ===
- McDonald, Brian. Caliber Presents: Volume One, Issue #19. "Scratchin'." Caliber Comics, 1989.
- McDonald, Brian. Caliber Presents: Volume One, Issue #24. "Puppy Love." Caliber Comics, 1989.
- McDonald, Brian. Harry the Cop, No. 1. San Jose, CA, Slave Labor Graphics, 1992. ASIN B0017QASIU
- McDonald, Brian. Hardware #9. Milestone, 1993. ASIN B000LA200M
- McDonald, Brian. Static No. 40 – Boyz Night Out. Milestone, 1996.
- McDonald, Brian. Predator: Strange Roux. Milwaukie, Oregon, Dark Horse Comics, 1996.
- McDonald, Brian and Morrow, Gray. Tarzan: The Gorilla Camp Raiders. United Media Syndicate, 1997.
- McDonald, Brian. Lost in Space #1. Milwaukie, Oregon, Dark Horse Comics, 1998. ASIN B000R32MAQ
- McDonald, Brian. Lost in Space #2. Milwaukie, Oregon, Dark Horse Comics, 1998. ASIN B000R335CU
- McDonald, Brian. Lost in Space #3. Milwaukie, Oregon, Dark Horse Comics, 1998. ASIN B000R3365Q
- McDonald, Brian. Abe Sapien: Drums of the Dead. Milwaukie, Oregon, Dark Horse Comics, 1998.
- McDonald, Brian. Aliens vs. Predator: Lefty's Revenge. Milwaukie, Oregon, Dark Horse Comics, 1999.
- McDonald, Brian and others. B.P.R.D.: Hollow Earth and Other Stories, (collects Abe Sapien: Drums of the Dead, among others), 2003. ISBN 978-1-56971-862-9
- McDonald, Brian. Aliens vs. Predator Omnibus: Volume 2 (collects Lefty's Revenge, among others). Milwaukie, Oregon, Dark Horse Comics, 2007. ISBN 1-59307-829-3
- McDonald, Brian and others. Predator Omnibus Volume 3 (collects Predator: Strange Roux, among others). Milwaukie, Oregon, Dark Horse Comics, 2008.
