= Dragon Prince (disambiguation) =

Dragon Prince may refer to

- Dragon Prince, a 1988 novel by Melanie Rawn that starts the Dragon Prince and Dragon Star trilogies
- Dragon Prince (comics), a 2008 comic book miniseries by Ron Marz and Lee Moder
- The Dragon Prince, a 2018 Netflix fantasy television series
- Druk Gyalsey, Crown Prince of Bhutan, translated to 'Dragon Prince' in English. Currently held by Jigme Namgyel Wangchuck.
- Dragon King, in Chinese mythology
- Dragon Prince, a fictional character in Agent from Above

== See also ==
- The Dragon and the Prince, a Serbian fairy tale
- Dragon Princess, a 1975 karate film
