= Alien: The Illustrated Story =

Graphic novel adaptation of the 1979 science-fiction horror film

- Cover of the original edition by Walter Simonson
- Date: June 1979
- No. of issues: 1
- Main characters: Ellen Ripley
- Series: Alien
- Page count: 64 pages
- Publisher: Heavy Metal Communications (1979); Titan Books (2012)

Creative team
- Writers: Archie Goodwin
- Artists: Walter Simonson
- Letterers: John Workman
- Colourists: Walter Simonson; Louise Simonson; Deborah Pedlar; Polly Law; Bob LeRose
- Creators: Dan O'Bannon; Ronald Shusett
- Editors: Charley Lippincott

Original publication
- Language: English
- ISBN: 0930368428; 978-0930368425

Alien: The Illustrated Story, or simply Alien, is an American sixty-four page graphic novel adaptation of the 1979 science fiction horror film Alien published by Heavy Metal magazine in 1979. It was scripted by Archie Goodwin and drawn by Walt Simonson. It is the first comic from the Alien franchise and one of few of the franchise's comic publications which is not associated with the long-lasting Aliens line from Dark Horse Comics. The book was a major critical and commercial success and was the first comic to ever be listed on the New York Times Bestsellers list.

== Development ==
Walt Simonson became involved in the project through a call from Heavy Metal magazine art director John Workman. Initially, the plan was for Carmine Infantino to pencil the comic with Simonson inking. However, during discussions, Simonson ended up taking on both penciling and inking duties himself. He then suggested Archie Goodwin as a possible scripter for the comic, which Workman agreed was a good idea.

While developing the comic, Goodwin worked from the original script. Simonson, as well, had access to production stills and even saw a rough cut of the film, which helped him capture the essence of the story. As a result, however, a few scenes that were cut from the final film ended up being included in the graphic novel.

Most of the coloring of the comic was done by Louise Simonson, Polly Law, and Deborah Pedlar.

Simonson's design for the comic's logo featured a Giger-esque type treatment; 20th Century Fox was initially unhappy with the cover art because it was deemed better than the movie's actual poster.

== Publication history ==
Heavy Metal published an eight-page teaser for the book in Heavy Metal magazine in vol. 3, #1 (May 1979). A second eight-page preview was published in Heavy Metal vol. 3, #2 (June 1979). The original 64-page trade paperback was released in June 1979 and distributed by Simon & Schuster.

The book was translated in 1979 into Dutch and republished in the Netherlands by Oberon, in Japanese by Japan UNI Agency, and in Spanish for Spain by Prohibida La Reproduction.

In 2012, Titan Books' reissued the graphic novel, "meticulously restored from original artwork in Walt Simonson's studio." The book was lauded for its high production values. That same year, Titan also released an "oversized hardcover edition" that included "an in-depth interview with Simonson, the original script pages, color tryouts and sketches."

The book was translated into French (as Alien: le huitième passager: "Alien: the Eighth Passenger") and published in France by Soleil Productions in 2013.

== Plot ==
The plot of the graphic novel follows that of the theatrical film, with minor differences.

One reviewer praised Archie Goodwin's script adaptation, which he felt improved on some flaws in the film: "Goodwin ... seems to get more into the class divisions on board the Nostromo between Ripley and Parker.... [T]he characters are a bit more fleshed out...."

A few scenes that were cut from the final film made it into the comic, as described by artist Walt Simonson:

There's a scene ... at the end, when Ripley is running around the spaceship, she bumps into a box and the box unfolds itself and it turns out to be the alien waiting there for her in the hallway.... [I]t was in the rough cut that I saw. I thought it was really cool.... They were still editing the film at that point, so when I got to the point in the graphic novel where I had to put that page in or not put it in, because it would affect the placement of the left and right pages of the story, I asked and they said, 'Right now, it's in.' I added it back in, pasted everything around it, and then, lo and behold, the movie comes out and the scene isn't there.... What that does, speaking as a storyteller, is it foreshadows what the alien does later when Ripley gets into a lifeboat and she isn't at all aware that the alien was there. I thought it was very cool that they would do something in the story where you begin to understand that the alien can fold up in ways that doesn't look like itself.... It moves the alien a few feet further away from just being a guy in a rubber suit.

There's also a short scene, just three panels or so, where Ripley and Lambert are talking and one of them asks the other if she's slept with Ash, the Ian Holm character, and she says, 'No; I never got the impression he was interested,' and the first girl didn't either. I thought that was very nice. It foreshadowed what you discover about Ash later on down the road.

== Reception ==
=== Sales ===
The book was a major success and appeared on The New York Times Mass Market bestseller list — the first comic to ever do so — for eight weeks between July and September 1979, reaching as high as number seven on the list. (The book was featured on the list decades before the graphic novel-specific list was created for the New York Times.) The book was a rare high-seller for the American comics industry in the year 1979 since sales were very down at that point. Of the success of the book, artist Walter Simonson downplayed his contributions, stating, "It was Alien. Anybody could have done it and [made it a best-seller]."

=== Critical response ===
The New York Times' review of the book called it "an eye-filling and vibrant graphic portrayal of the gripping and fantastic tale that is Alien." Frank Plowright of The Slings & Arrows Comic Guide expressed that the book remains Heavy Metal's best home-grown work.

Comics writer Warren Ellis named Alien: The Illustrated Story as "the single best adaptation of film into comics ever," calling it "a stunning piece of work, hugely progressive and innovative."

Comic Book Resources (CBR) covered the re-issued edition of the book in a number of articles. Timothy Callahan's review included this analysis: "Archie Goodwin and Walt Simonson crafted a little near-perfect slice of cinema in graphic novel form back in 1979, and they did it by using all the tricks at their disposal." In a detailed analysis of Simonson's art, Greg Burgas characterized Alien: The Illustrated Story as "a really nice book on its own, in some ways better than the movie." And in his rundown of the 15 best Xenomorph comics, Michael Holland of CBR listed Alien: The Illustrated Story as #3, calling it a "must-read" and calling out the few scenes that showed events from the film from a different perspective.

Scott Collura of IGN praised the work of Goodwin and Simonson, citing "Goodwin's lean adaptation of the screenplay" and his ability to "trim bits and pieces to keep the comic moving at a brisk, readable pace, but it never feels like anything has really been cut." Of Simonson, he wrote "the artwork itself is beautiful (in an alien ripping your head open kind of way). . . ," calling it "ornate and detailed" and going on to write, "But the art is also rough and tough at times, which is certainly in keeping with the 'truckers in space' story. It's not uncommon to turn the page and discover another stunning layout: a double-splash page of the Space Jockey's ship. . . ."

Lee Pfeiffer of Cinema Retro praised the book, writing that it "does an admirable job of compacting all of the key story elements without resorting to the kinds of 'artistic license' that often compromise many other comic adaptations of films," and calling the artwork "ground-breaking." Brett Chittenden of Geek Hard praised the book as well, noting "the pacing seems a little different but never in a bad way. It's very much like Ridley Scott shot his film and then Goodwin and Simonson came in and re-shot the entire film with the same actors and sets and without seeing Scott's version. And it works really well."

Scott VanderPloeg of AE Index praised the "Original Art Edition" of the book, citing the extras: "a signature plate with Simonson's in pencil, complete script, colouring examples, an in-depth interview and an afterword by Simonson," and calling it "a bargain at $75."

Alien vs. Predator Central ranked the comic as #10 in the Top 10 Alien Comics list.

Kevin Church of ComicsAlliance reviewed the book positively, calling it the fifth-best comic book adaptation of a film, and noting that:

Alien: The Illustrated Story is an example of a lower page count working to make a better adaptation. The creators work with the larger page size to ensure that each one matters. Simonson's panel arrangements are nothing short of masterful throughout, with storytelling that's simultaneously easy to follow and dynamic. This page is an example of how effectively the creators used what they were given: three minutes on film is compressed into 13 panels, but it never seems rushed or compressed.

==== Art analysis ====
The work has been highly praised for its art. Jan Baetens and Hugo Frey, the authors of the book The Graphic Novel: An Introduction, assert that Alien: The Illustrated Story's art by Simonson has a distinctive format, particularly the panel and page layout, which serves to provide the audience with a careful and cohesively shaped work which highlights the tension in the plot (as well as for the characters) and brings them to greater attention to the readers. According to Baetens and Frey, Simonson achieves this by utilizing standard comic frames, but then subtly breaking the images outside of the panels and organizing the pages into a more "free-form" style. In contrast to another acclaimed graphic novel, A Contract with God by Will Eisner, more traditional grid panels are still present at places but are frequently reduced or are abandoned altogether as the story progresses. In their opinion, so does the characters and backgrounds without framing lend the work a confidence and readability that is impressive. Comparing it again to A Contract with God, they express that Simonson's highly planned-out but simultaneously free-flowing approach prepares readers for three double splash pages of major scenes from the story.

Fellow comic book artist Chris Sprouse has praised Simonson's work on the book and stated that the copy he owns had a place of honor in his comic collection in his youth. Sprouse expressed that he loved Simonson's work with the technology portrayed in the comic, which he described as accurate, and that he appreciated that Simonson put effort into making the story visually exciting, as opposed to many other movie-tie-in comics that Sprouse had read. Sprouse cited Simonson's work as his greatest inspiration, together with that of Frank Miller. Similarly, cartoonist Kyle Baker said that Alien: The Illustrated Edition was the only comics-format film adaptation he ever liked.

=== Awards ===
- Harvey Awards
  - Best Graphic Album of Previously Published Work (2013)

== Legacy ==
Walt Simonson would later participate in the making of a parody of Alien: The Illustrated Story, in the pages of Howard the Duck, in a story named "SNAILIAN", which features a snail in the role of the Alien creature as it menaces Howard.
