= Mindhunter =

Mindhunter may refer to:

- Mindhunter: Inside the FBI's Elite Serial Crime Unit, non-fiction crime book written by retired FBI agent John E. Douglas and Mark Olshaker (1995)
  - Mindhunter (TV series), a crime television adaptation made by showrunner David Fincher
- Mindhunter (comic book), three-issue comic book miniseries published by Dark Horse Comics (2000–01)
- Mindhunters, 2004 American-British crime thriller slasher film (2004)

Not to be confused with thought police.

== See also ==
- Minehunter, vessel for detecting and destroying naval mines
