= Aliens vs. Predator (comics) =

Comic book series started in 1989

- Cover of the trade paperback of the original Aliens versus Predator comic series.

Publication information
- Publisher: Dark Horse Comics; Marvel Comics
- Formats: Original material for the series has been published as a strip in the comics anthology(s) Dark Horse Presents and a set of limited series and graphic novels.
- Genre: Sci-Fi, Adventure
- Publication date: Dark Horse: 1989–2020; Marvel: 2021–

Aliens vs. Predator (also known as Aliens versus Predator, abbreviated AVP) is a comic book series published by Dark Horse Comics between 1989 and 2020 on an intermittent basis, written and drawn by various artists. Dark Horse also published the Aliens and Predator lines of comics.

AVP is part of the crossover franchise originated and published by Dark Horse Comics.

According to the notes which accompany the first Aliens versus Predator graphic novel, the original idea of combining the Aliens with Predators was the result of a late 1980s brain-storming session between the comic's creators and Dark Horse executives. AVP artist and editor Chris Warner is credited with suggesting the concept. Eventually, a film, Alien vs. Predator, was made in 2004, with a sequel in 2007 (called Aliens vs. Predator: Requiem) including a hybrid of a Xenomorph and a Predator. However, the films did not follow either the settings or the stories of the original comic series.

== Original Aliens vs. Predator comic ==
The first Aliens vs Predator centers on Ryushi, a recently colonized planet, and Machiko Noguchi, the Chigusa Corporation's administrator there. The settlers on Ryushi raise cattle-like quadrupedal ungulates called rhynth for export to other solar systems, and at the time of the story are in the process of assembling a shipment of the native livestock.

Unbeknownst to the colonists, Ryushi is a traditional hunting ground of the Predators, and they are returning for their initiation rites. On board the Predator ship, the prey are prepared: an Alien queen lays eggs for delivery to Ryushi. Confounding the Predator's safeguards, this queen manages to slip an egg containing the seed of another queen into the shipment.

On reaching Ryushi, the eggs hatch and infect Rhynths. Led by a Predator elder, "Broken Tusk", the Predators arrive expecting to encounter Aliens. However, they soon encounter the settlers and, after Broken Tusk is incapacitated, change their plans to hunt them instead.

Meanwhile, the infected Rhynth have been loaded aboard a cargo transporter and, with a queen among their number, an Alien colony quickly takes hold. The Predator assault continues to the settler colony itself, and the surviving settlers find themselves pitched between the Aliens and Predators. Broken Tusk, now recovered due to the intervention of a human doctor, sides with Machiko, and together with the cargo ship's crew they arrange for the transporter's massive orbiter to crash into Ryushi and destroy the colony and the Aliens.

In the ensuing fight, Broken Tusk is mortally wounded, but, admiring the courage of his human comrade, "bloods" Machiko with the mark of his clan. The story concludes with Machiko the sole inhabitant of Ryushi, the surviving settlers having been evacuated from the planet. She awaits, and is rewarded with, the return of the Predators and another hunt. One of Broken Tusk's former Predator rivals greets her and, recognizing Broken Tusk's clan symbol, accepts Machiko into the hunt.

== Limited series and stories ==
- Untitled in original appearance (1989-1990 short serial, Dark Horse Presents issues 34-36, Dark Horse Comics)
- Aliens vs. Predator (a.k.a. Aliens versus Predator, 1990, Dark Horse Comics)
- Aliens vs. Predator (1990 short story, Dark Horse Comics)
- Aliens: Space Marines (1992, Dark Horse Comics)
- Aliens vs. Predator 2 (a.k.a. Aliens vs. Predator II, 1992-1993 short story, Dark Horse Comics)
- Aliens/Predator: Deadliest of the Species (1993-1995, Dark Horse Comics) — In this story, the aliens have overrun the Earth and the rich have left the surface to live in skyliners. In one of these airships a girl is having strange dreams and they are about to start coming true.
- "Aliens vs. Predator: Blood Time" (1994 short story in the anthology Dark Horse Comics, published by Dark Horse Comics)
- Aliens vs. Predator: Booty (a.k.a. Aliens versus Predator: Booty, 1995-1996, Dark Horse Comics)
- Aliens vs. Predator: Duel (1995, Dark Horse Comics)
- Aliens vs. Predator: War (a.k.a. Aliens versus Predator: War and Aliens/Predator: War, 1995, Dark Horse Comics) — In this story, Machiko Noguchi, disgruntled with her life amongst the hunters, turns on the Predators as they conduct a xenomorph hunt on a planet with a human exploratory colony. Three refugees from a prior corporate-staged Alien encounter have just arrived on the planet and also trying to battle their way to freedom.
- Aliens vs. Predator: Booty (a.k.a. Aliens versus Predator: Booty, 1996 collected version, Dark Horse Comics)
- Dark Horse Classics - Aliens versus Predator (1997, Dark Horse Comics)
- Aliens vs. Predator: Eternal (a.k.a. Aliens versus Predator: Eternal, 1998, Dark Horse Comics) — An old man uses technology from a salvaged Predator ship to gain fame and fortune, and uses Predator body parts to unnaturally extend his life. In the near future, a self-serving reporter gets caught up in his schemes just as the man unwittingly unleashes xenomorphs from the ship, attracting a Predator hunting party.
- Aliens vs. Predator: Annual (1999, Dark Horse Comics) — Contains Hell-Bent, Pursuit, Lefty's Revenge, Chained to Life and Death and Old Secrets.
- Aliens vs. Predator: The Web (1999, Dark Horse Comics)
- Aliens vs. Predator: Xenogenesis (a.k.a. Aliens vs. Predator: Genocide, 1999-2000, Dark Horse Comics)
- Alien vs. Predator: Thrill of the Hunt (2004, Dark Horse Comics)
- Alien vs. Predator: Whoever Wins... We Lose (2005, Dark Horse Comics)
- Alien vs. Predator: Sand Trap (2007, Dark Horse Comics)
- Aliens vs. Predator Omnibus: Volume 1 (2007, Dark Horse Comics)
- Aliens vs. Predator Omnibus: Volume 2 (2007, Dark Horse Comics)
- Aliens vs. Predator: Deadspace (2008, Dark Horse Comics)
- Alien vs. Predator: Civilized Beasts (2008, Dark Horse Comics)
- Aliens vs. Predator: Three World War (2010, Dark Horse Comics)
- Aliens vs. Predator: Special Collector's Edition (2010, Dark Horse Comics)
- Alien vs. Predator: Fire and Stone (2014-2015, Dark Horse Comics)
- Alien vs. Predator: Life and Death (2016-2017, Dark Horse Comics)
- Alien vs. Predator: Thicker Than Blood (2019-2020, Dark Horse Comics)

== Crossovers ==
Other series have thrown extra combatants into the mix in a range of crossovers:

- Witchblade/Aliens/Darkness/Predator:
  - Mindhunter (by David Quinn, Mel Rubi, and Mike Perkins, Dark Horse Comics, four-issues miniseries, 2000, tpb, 96 pages, 2001, ISBN 1-56971-615-3)
  - Overkill (by Paul Jenkins and Clarence Lansang, Top Cow, two-issue mini-series, 1999)
- Aliens versus Predator versus The Terminator (2000, Dark Horse Comics)
- Superman and Batman versus Aliens and Predator (2007, Dark Horse Comics); a.k.a. Superman and Batman vs. Aliens and Predator)
- Predator vs. Judge Dredd vs. Aliens: Splice and Dice (2016-2017, Dark Horse Comics); a.k.a. Predator vs. Judge Dredd vs. Aliens)

== Publications ==
Aliens versus Predator comic book cover for the story Booty

Aliens vs. Predator was introduced in Dark Horse Presents #36 in February 1990 as a conclusion to a three-part story arc. The two previous issues had separate stories for the two franchises, #34 (November 1989) had an Aliens story and #35 (December 1989) had a Predator story with #36 bringing the two franchises together for the first time.

=== Collected editions ===
A number of Aliens vs. Predator trade paperbacks have been published:

- Aliens vs. Predator (by Randy Stradley, Chris Warner, and Phill Norwood, tpb, 176 pages, Dark Horse Comics, 1991, ISBN 1-878574-27-2, Titan Books, 176 pages, 1992, ISBN 1-85286-413-3)
- Aliens/Predator: Deadliest of the Species (by Chris Claremont, with pencils Jackson Guice and inks by John Beatty (1-3) and full art by Eduardo Barreto (4-12), Dark Horse Comics, 320 pages, tpb, 1996, ISBN 1-56971-184-4, Titan Books, 1998, ISBN 1-85286-953-4, hardcover, 1997, ISBN 1-56971-182-8) collects:
  - Aliens vs. Predator: Deadliest of the Species Book 1 (tpb, collects Deadliest of the Species #1-6, 152 pages, 1995, Boxtree, ISBN 0-7522-0878-0, Warner Books, ISBN 1-56971-184-4)
  - Aliens vs. Predator: Deadliest of the Species Book 2 (tpb, collects Deadliest of the Species #7-12, 156 pages, 1995, Boxtree, ISBN 0-7522-0695-8)
- Aliens vs. Predator: War (by Randy Stradley, 5-issue mini-series, 1995, tpb, 1996, Titan Books, 176 pages, ISBN 1-56971-158-5, Dark Horse Comics, 200 pages, ISBN 1-56971-158-5)
- Aliens vs. Predator: Booty (by Barbara Kesel and Chris Chalenor, 1996)
- Aliens vs. Predator: Eternal (by Ian Edginton and Alex Maleev, Dark Horse Comics, 4-issue mini-series, 1998, tpb, 88 pages, 1999, ISBN 1-56971-409-6)
- Aliens vs. Predator: Xenogenesis (by Andi Watson, Mel Rubi and inkers Mark Lipka and Norman Lee, 4-issue mini-series, 1998-1999)
- Aliens vs. Predator: Thrill of the Hunt (by Mike Kennedy and Roger Robinson, Dark Horse Comics, tpb, 96 pages, 2004, ISBN 1-59307-257-0)
- Aliens vs. Predator: Civilized Beasts (by Mike Kennedy and Roger Robinson, Dark Horse Comics, tpb, 96 pages, 2005, ISBN 1-59307-342-9)
- Aliens vs. Predator: Omnibus - Volume 1 (collects Aliens vs. Predator - original series, Blood Time, Duel, War, Eternal, Old Secrets, and The Web, 456 pages, April 2007, ISBN 1-59307-735-1)
- Aliens vs. Predator: Omnibus - Volume 2 (collects Deadliest of the Species, Booty, Hell-Bent, Pursuit, Lefty's Revenge, Chained to Life and Death, and Xenogenesis, 448 pages, October 2007, ISBN 1-59307-829-3)

== See also ==
- List of Alien (franchise) comics
- List of Predator (franchise) comics
- List of Alien vs. Predator (franchise) novels
- List of comics based on films
