= Ron Marz =

American comic book writer (born 1965)

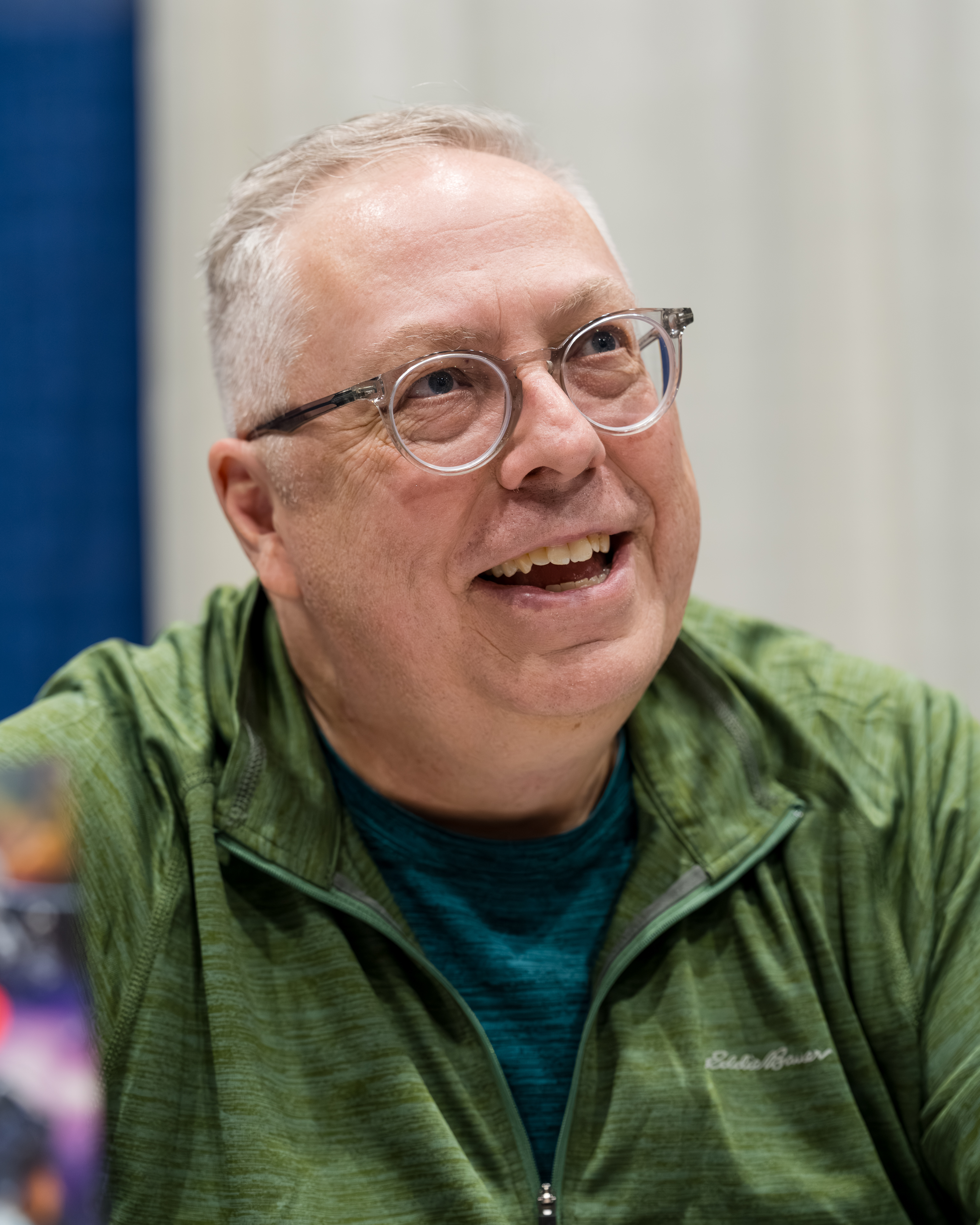
- Marz at GalaxyCon Oklahoma City in 2026
- Born: November 17, 1965 (age 61) Kingston, New York, U.S.
- Area: Writer
- Notable works: Batman/Aliens; DC vs. Marvel; Green Lantern; Silver Surfer; Witchblade

Ron Marz (born November 17, 1965) is an American comic book writer, known for his work on titles such as Batman/Aliens, DC vs. Marvel, Green Lantern, Silver Surfer, and Witchblade.

== Career ==
Marz is known for his work on Silver Surfer and Green Lantern, as well as the DC vs. Marvel crossover and Batman/Aliens. He co-created Genis-Vell in Silver Surfer Annual #6 (1993). Marz worked on the CrossGen Comics series Scion, Mystic, Sojourn, and The Path. At Dark Horse Comics he created Samurai: Heaven and Earth and various Star Wars comics. He has written for Devil's Due Publishing's Aftermath line including Blade of Kumori. In 1995, he had a brief run on X-O Manowar for Valiant Comics. The following year, Marz wrote the DC/Marvel: All Access limited series which was an intercompany crossover between DC and Marvel characters.

While writing Green Lantern, Marz wrote the "Emerald Twilight" storyline, in which the character of Hal Jordan, stricken with grief, became a mass murderer, leading to the destruction of the Green Lantern Corps, and Kyle Rayner being chosen at random as the last Green Lantern.

Marz's 2000s work includes a number of Top Cow Productions comic books, including Witchblade, which he wrote from issue #80 (Nov. 2004) to issue #150 (Dec. 2011), plus a number of specials and crossover stories featuring the character, such as Witchblade/The Punisher in 2007 and Witchblade/Devi in 2008. His other Top Cow work includes Cyberforce #1–6 in 2006 and Cyberforce/X-Men in 2007.

For DC Comics, he has written Ion, a 12-part comic book miniseries that followed the Kyle Rayner character after the One Year Later event, and Tales of the Sinestro Corps Presents: Parallax and Tales of the Sinestro Corps Presents: Ion, two one-shot tie-ins to the Green Lantern crossover, The Sinestro Corps War.

Marz wrote Moonstone Books' 2006 annual featuring The Phantom, and recruited writers Chuck Dixon, Mike Bullock, Tony Bedard, and Rafael Nieves to participate with chapters for the book.

Marz became an editor of three of Virgin Comics' Shakti Line titles in 2007 and oversaw Devi, Ramayan 3392 A.D. and The Sadhu. He wrote the Beyond series, based on a story created by Deepak Chopra.

In 2008 Marz wrote Broken Trinity, which featured the characters Witchblade, The Darkness, and Angelus, as well as the tie-in series, Broken Trinity: Witchblade, Broken Trinity: Angelus (2008), and Broken Trinity: Aftermath (2009). He signed an exclusive contract with Top Cow, which saw him write three comics a month: two for Marc Silvestri's Top Cow universe, and a creator-owned project.

In 2011, Marz was the writer on Voodoo, which was part of DC Comics' company-wide title relaunch, The New 52.

In 2020 Marz collaborated with Andy Lanning on the nine-issue DC Comics crossover storyline "Endless Winter", which would debut that December.

== Women in refrigerators trope ==
In 1999, Gail Simone introduced the term Women in Refrigerators to highlight a troubling trend in comic narratives: the use of female characters' suffering—through death, injury, or assault—as mere plot devices to advance male protagonists' stories. This concept was sparked by an event in a 1994 Green Lantern issue written by Ron Marz, where Kyle Rayner discovers his girlfriend Alexandra DeWitt's fate at the hands of the villain Major Force, who had murdered her and left her body in a refrigerator. Simone's critique aimed to shed light on the broader issue of gender bias and the disposability of female characters within the genre.

In response, Marz stated: "To me the real difference is less male-female than main character-supporting character. In most cases, main characters, 'title' characters who support their own books, are male. ... the supporting characters are the ones who suffer the more permanent and shattering tragedies. And a lot of supporting characters are female." He also further explained:

I created her [Alexandra DeWitt] with the intention of having her be murdered at the hands of Major Force. I took a lot of care in building her as a character, because I wanted her to be liked and her death to mean something to the readers. I wanted readers to be horrified at the crime, and to empathize with Kyle's loss. Her death was meant to bring brutal realization to Kyle that being GL [Green Lantern] wasn't fun and games. It was also meant to sever his links with his old life, paving the way for his move to New York. And ultimately I wanted her death to be memorable and illustrate just how truly heinous Major Force was. Thus the fridge.

== Personal life ==
As of 2013, Marz lives in Duanesburg, New York.

== Bibliography ==
=== CrossGen ===
- Chimera #1–4 (2003)
- CrossGen Chronicles #1–2, 5 (2000–2001)
- Mystic #1–17 (2000–2001)
- The Path #1–18 (2002–2003)
- Scion #1–39 (2000–2003)
- Sojourn #1–24 (2001–2003)

=== Dark Horse Comics ===
- Dark Horse Presents #101–102, 138 (1995–1998)
- Star Wars: Darth Maul #1–4 (2000)
- Star Wars: Empire #19–22, 24–28 (2004)
- Star Wars Tales #1–2 (1999)

=== Dark Horse Comics / DC Comics ===
- Batman/Aliens #1–2 (1997)
- Batman/Tarzan: Claws of the Cat-Woman #1–4 (1999)
- Darkness/Superman #1–2 (2005)
- Green Lantern Versus Aliens #1–4 (2000)

=== DC Comics ===
- Action Comics #749 (1998)
- The Adventures of Superman #563, 570 (1998–1999)
- The Adventures of Superman vol. 2 #15 (2014)
- All-American Comics vol. 2 #1 (1999)
- Batman 80-Page Giant #1 (1998)
- Batman Confidential #37 (2010)
- Batman Villains Secret Files and Origins #1 (1998)
- Batman: Hidden Treasures #1 (2010)
- Convergence Batman and Robin #2 (2015)
- Convergence Justice League International #1–2 (2015)
- Countdown Presents the Search for Ray Palmer: Wildstorm #1 (2007)
- DC Retroactive: Green Lantern The '90s #1 (2011)
- Detention Comics #1 (1996)
- Doctor Strangefate #1 (1996)
- Friday the 13th: Bad Land #1–2 (2008)
- Green Lantern vol. 3 #48–107, 109–114, 117–125, #0, #1,000,000, 176–181, Annual #4, 6 (1994–2004)
- Green Lantern 80-Page Giant #1 (1998)
- Green Lantern Corps Quarterly #4–7 (1993)
- Green Lantern Plus #1 (1996)
- Green Lantern Secret Files and Origins #1–2 (1998–1999)
- Green Lantern/Flash: Faster Friends #1 (1997)
- Green Lantern/Sentinel: Heart of Darkness #1–3 (1998)
- Green Lantern: Fear Itself HC (1999)
- Ion #1–12 (2006–2007)
- JSA Secret Files and Origins #1 (1999)
- Legends of the Dark Knight 100–Page Super-Spectacular #5 (2015)
- Parallax: Emerald Night #1 (1996)
- Secret Origins of Super-Villains 80–Page Giant #1 (1999)
- Superboy #32–41, 45–47 (1996–1998)
- Superboy Plus #1 (1997)
- Superman vol. 2 #140, 147 (1998–1999)
- Superman Secret Files and Origins #2 (1999)
- Superman: The Man of Steel #84 (1998)
- Tales of the Sinestro Corps: Ion #1 (2008)
- Tales of the Sinestro Corps: Parallax #1 (2007)
- Tangent Comics/Metal Men #1 (1997)
- Tangent Comics/Powergirl #1 (1998)
- Tangent: Superman's Reign #1–11 (2008–2009)
- Voodoo #1–4 (2011–2012)

=== DC Comics / Marvel Comics ===
- DC vs. Marvel/Marvel vs. DC #1, 3 (1996)
- DC/Marvel: All Access #1–4 (1996–1997)
- Green Lantern/Silver Surfer: Unholy Alliances #1 (1996)

=== Dynamite Entertainment ===
- John Carter: Warlord of Mars #1–14 (2014–2015)
- Pathfinder: Goblins! #3 (2013)
- Prophecy #1–7 (2012–2013)
- Red Sonja: Sonja Goes East #1 (2006)
- Red Sonja: She-Devil With a Sword #30 (2008)
- Savage Tales #1–2 (‘The Witch’s Familiar’ feature only, 2007)
- Turok #1–5 (2019)

=== Image Comics ===
- Angelus #1–6 (2009–2010)
- Artifacts #1–28, 30–32, 40 (2010–2014)
- Broken Trinity #1–3 (2008)
- Cyberforce vol. 3 #1–6 (2006)
- The Darkness #10–13 (2004)
- Dragon Prince #1–4 (2008)
- First Born #1–3 (2007)
- Magdalena vol. 3 #1–12 (2010–2012)
- Ravine Volumes 1–2 (2013–2014)
- Shinku #1–5 (2011–2012)
- Stormwatch #10–24, Stormwatch Special #1–2 (1994–1995)
- Velocity #1–4 (2010–2011)
- Wildstorm Rising #2 (1995)
- Witchblade #80–150 (2004–2011) #170–185 (2013–2015)
- Zealot #1–3 (1995)

=== Image Comics / Marvel Comics ===
- Unholy Union #1 (2007)

=== Marvel Comics ===
- Captain America Annual #13 (1994)
- Cosmic Powers #1–6 (1994)
- Cosmic Powers Unlimited #1 (1995)
- Marvel Comics Presents #101 (1992)
- Namor, the Sub-Mariner Annual #2–3 (1992–1993)
- Quasar #59 (1994)
- Secret Defenders #9–14 (1993–1994)
- Shadows & Light #1 (1998)
- Silver Surfer vol. 3 #42–43, 49, #51–102, Annual #3–7 (1990–1995)
- Silver Surfer: Dangerous Artifacts #1 (1996)
- Thor #460–471, Annual #18 (1993–1994)
- What If...? vol. 2 #22, 27, 30, 43, 45, 48–49 (1991–1993)

=== Valiant Comics ===
- X-O Manowar #44–49, #50-X, #50-O (1995)

=== Virgin Comics ===
- Beyond #1–3 (2008)

Preceded by Jim Starlin	Silver Surfer vol. 3 writer 1990–1995 (with Jim Starlin in 1990–1991)	Succeeded by Glenn Greenberg
Preceded by Tom DeFalco and Ron Frenz	Thor writer 1993–1994 (with Jim Starlin in 1993)	Succeeded by Roy Thomas
Preceded by Gerard Jones	Green Lantern vol. 3 writer 1994–2000	Succeeded by Jay Faerber
Preceded by n/a	Mystic writer 2000–2001	Succeeded by Tony Bedard
Preceded by Ben Raab	Green Lantern vol. 3 writer 2004	Succeeded by Geoff Johns
