= Beyond (Virgin Comics) =

Three issue series from Virgin Comics

Beyond #1 Art by Edison George

Beyond is a three issue series from Virgin Comics. It was created by Deepak Chopra and written by Ron Marz with art by Edison George and is being adapted from a screenplay written by Chopra.

== Plot ==
The solicit described the series as "Chopra's original story of an American businessman who is propelled across dimensions and into an adventure like no other. While traveling in India with his family, his wife disappears, he will stop at nothing - and go literally anywhere - to save her." The following issue will continue the journey of Michael (the protagonist) in his search for his wife Anna.

== Production ==
The series was planned to run 4 issues in its debut arc but only 3 issues were published, leaving the continuing storyline incomplete.

== Release ==
The series was launched in late May 2008.

== Movie adaptation ==
Suri Krishnamma will direct the film adaptation of the supernatural thriller comic, the screenplay is currently in works from Deepak Chopra. It will produce by Gotham Chopra and Sharad Devarajan and as executive producers works John Garland and Michael Dufficy.
