= Staz Johnson =

English comic book artist and penciller

- Born: Stewart Johnson; 12 August 1965 (age 61)
- Areas: Writer, Penciller, Inker
- Notable works: Robin; Catwoman

Stewart "Staz" Johnson is an English comic book artist and penciller, best known for his work on DC Comics' Robin and Catwoman series.

== Biography ==
Johnson got his start working on magazines which covered the then-burgeoning fantasy role playing games industry. From there he got work at Marvel UK where he worked on weekly comic book series such as Transformers and Action Force. During this period Johnson's first work was published in the US in Marvel Comics G.I. Joe European Missions in 1989; however this was not original work - the series reprinted his Marvel UK Action Force material.

In 1992 he did his first work for Fleetway Edition's 2000 AD, a Tharg's Future Shocks feature. His most recent work on the title was part of a Rogue Trooper serial in 2003.

His work on Marvel UK's Death Wreck series in 1994 led to him getting work from Marvel US on titles such as Thor (1994), Force Works (1995) and Spider-Man: Funeral for an Octopus (1995).

He then began a long period where he worked exclusively for Marvel's competitor DC Comics, initially on a six-issue storyline in Detective Comics #689-694 (September 1995- February 1996) which led to stints as regular penciller of Robin (1996–1999) and Catwoman (2000–2001). His most recent work for DC was the inter-company crossover Batman/Aliens II limited series in 2003.

In 2003 he returned to Marvel, and it is at that publisher that most of his work has since been published. At Marvel he has worked on Wolverine, New X-Men, Underworld, Cable & Deadpool, Civil War: War Crimes and it was also through Marvel he got his work on the Heroes webcomics.

Johnson was also the superhero expert on the Channel 4 television show Zero to Hero.

He is currently working on a 150-page Dracula comic and has produced The New World Order, a comic book series based on a line of Agent Provocateur lingerie.

Johnson lives in Wakefield, West Yorkshire, where he was brought up.

== Bibliography ==
Death Wreck art by Johnson

Comics work includes:

- "Starting Over" (in The Transformers #261, Marvel UK, 1990)
- Tharg's Future Shocks:
  - "A Hitch In Time" (with John Tomlinson, in 2000 AD #796, 1992)
  - "Old Red" (with Simon Spurrier, in 2000 AD #1232, 2001)
  - "Adventures in the War Trade" (with Alec Worley, in 2000 AD #1574, 2008)
- Death Wreck (with Craig Houston, Marvel UK, 1994)
- Detective Comics #689-694 (DC Comics, September 1995 - February 1996)
- Robin (DC Comics, 1996–1999)
- Catwoman (DC Comics, 2000–2001)
- Killer (pencils, with Steve Moore and inks by David Roach, in 2000 AD #1264-1272, 2001)
- Judge Dredd (with John Wagner):
  - "The Sons of Katie Didd" (in 2000 AD #1248-1249, 2001)
  - "Dead Funny" (in 2000 AD #1320, 2002)
  - "Hot Night in 95" (in Judge Dredd Megazine #307-308 and 310, 2011)
- Rogue Trooper (with Gordon Rennie and Gerry Finley-Day):
  - "What Lies Beneath" (pencils, with inks by David Roach, in 2000 AD #1301-1304, 2002)
  - "Lions" (in 2000 AD #1308, 2002)
  - "Dead Funny" (in 2000 AD #1345-1347, 2003)
  - "Dead Ringer" (in 2000 AD #2011, 2010)
- Batman/Aliens 2 (with Ian Edginton, DC Comics, 2003 ISBN 1-4012-0081-8)
- Wolverine (Marvel Comics, 2003)
- Spider-Man/Doctor Octopus: Negative Exposure #1 (Marvel Comics, 2003)
- Spider-Man 2: The Movie (Marvel Comics, 2004)
- New X-Men (Marvel Comics, 2004)
- Underworld (2006)
- Cable & Deadpool (Marvel Comics, 2006)
- Civil War: War Crimes (Marvel Comics, 2007)
- The New World Order (with writer Brady Webb, 2009)
