= Samurai: Heaven and Earth =

- Samurai Heaven and Earth No. 1 (December 2004)

Publication information
- Publisher: Dark Horse Comics
- Publication date: 2005 (first miniseries)
- No. of issues: 5 (first miniseries)
- Main character(s): Asukai Shiro, Yoshiko, Don Miguel Ratera Aguilar Y Aragon

Creative team
- Written by: Ron Marz
- Artist: Luke Ross

Collected editions
- Samurai: Heaven and Earth (2006): ISBN 1-59307-388-7

Samurai: Heaven and Earth is a comic book about a samurai and his journey to rescue the woman he loves, published by Dark Horse Comics. The title refers to an oath he swore to return to her: "I will allow nothing in Heaven or on Earth to come between us".

It is written by Ron Marz and drawn by Luke Ross.

== Characters ==
- Asukai Shiro: The main character
- Yoshiko: Shiro's love for whom he searches
- Don Miguel Ratera Aguilar Y Aragon: Spanish ambassador obsessed with Yoshiko

== Plot ==
The story starts in Kaga Province in 1704 with a Chinese army of thousands attacking a Japanese castle of barely a hundred. During the battle only two samurai are shown to survive, one being the main character Asukai Shiro who was knocked out under a pile of rubble. The other survivor, Masahiro informs him that Yoshiko was taken by the Chinese. Shiro then acts as Masahiro's second for ritual suicide as he does not have anything to live for. Shiro then pursues the Chinese to China and battles the warlord and his small army at his fortress after learning that Yoshiko was sold to an Arab slave merchant.

Shiro follows the Arab to Paris, where he is accosted by bigoted Frenchmen at Notre Dame, he then battles three musketeers, eventually being subdued when one hits him from the back with a barrel of wine.

Shiro is then imprisoned in Bastille. He is released under the care of a Spanish Ambassador, Don Miguel Ratera Aguilar Y Aragon who plans on using him to assassinate Louis XIV in Versailles. There he learns that Yoshiko has been bought by Louis XIV, which causes him to no longer want to complete the assassination and just leave, but Louis and the musketeers don't know that and a battle ensues. Don Miguel tries to kill Shiro after learning he will not complete the assassination and during the battle Shiro is knocked unconscious and Don Miguel leaves with Yoshiko for Spain. The last comic ends with Shiro riding from Versailles on a horse that was given to him by the musketeers.

== Publication ==
The story spans at least three 5-issue miniseries, the first of which appeared in 2005 and was collected as a trade paperback a year later:

- Samurai: Heaven and Earth (with Ron Marz and Luke Ross, Dark Horse, 144 pages, 2006 ISBN 1-59307-388-7)

It included a rare prelude for the first time in color and art done by other artists, along with the 5 issues.

The second miniseries began in December 2006 and ended in mid-2007. The trade paperback was published late in 2007.

In late July 2007, Darkhorse started its Myspace Darkhorse Presents Online Comic. The first issue contained a short Samurai: H&E comic, which takes place between issues 2 and 3 of Volume 1.
