= Mel Rubi =

- Area: Penciller
- Notable works: Aliens vs. Predator vs. The Terminator, Aliens vs. Predator: Xenogenesis, Spider-Man/Red Sonja, The Terminator: The Dark Years, Mindhunter

Mel Rubi is an artist best known for his comic book work.

== Bibliography ==
=== Interiors ===
==== Pencils ====
- Aliens vs. Predator Annual (1999)
- Aliens vs. Predator vs. The Terminator #1–4 (2000)
- Aliens vs. Predator: Xenogenesis #1–4 (1999)
- All-New Official Handbook of the Marvel Universe A to Z #2, #3 (2007)
- Angel #1–4, 7, 10, 11, 15–17, 20 (2001)
- Deathblow #15–17, 26 (1993)
- Doctor Strange, Sorcerer Supreme #60–62, 64, 65, 68 (1988)
- Excalibur #115–118, 120 (1988)
- Faro Korbit #1-3 (2004)
- Gen13 Yearbook '97 (1997)
- Grifter #1–5 (1996)
- Kiss #1–6, 8–13, TPB #1–4 (2002)
- Marvel Legacy: The 1990s Handbook #1 (2007)
- Mike Baron's Detonator #1 (2004)
- Morbius, the Living Vampire #14 (1992)
- Predator: Xenogenesis #1–4 (1999)
- The Punisher War Journal #72–74, 76–78 (1988)
- Red Sonja #0–6, 8–18, TPB 01 (2005)
- Shadowman #20 (1992)
- Spider-Man/Red Sonja #1–5 (2007)
- Star Wars: The Bounty Hunters #2 (1999)
- Stormwatch #20 (1993)
- The Terminator: The Dark Years #1–3 (1999)
- The Uncanny X-Men #344–345, 397–398 (1963)
- Wetworks #25 (1994)
- What If? #110 (1989)
- Mindhunter #1–3 (2000)
- Wolverine #127 (1988)
- X-Factor #138 (1986)
- X-Man #51 (1995)
- X-Men Unlimited #16 (1993)

==== Inks ====
- Red Sonja #0–6, 8–18 (2005)
- Spider-Man/Red Sonja #4–5 (2007)

=== Cover work ===
- Angel #1–4 (2001)
- Army of Darkness vs. Re-Animator TPB #3 (2005)
- Backlash #16–17 (1994)
- Doctor Strange, Sorcerer Supreme #60–62, 67 (1988)
- Excalibur #120 (1988)
- Giant Size Red Sonja (2007)
- Grifter #1–5 (1996)
- Kiss #4–6, 8–13 (2002)
- Mike Baron's Detonator #1 (2004)
- Predator: Xenogenesis #1–4 (1999)
- The Punisher War Journal #72–74 (1988)
- Red Sonja #0–6, 8–18, 21, 25–29 (2005)
- Savage Tales #1 (2007)
- Sword of Red Sonja: Doom of the Gods #1, 2, 4 (2007)
- The Uncanny X-Men Annual 1998 (1998)
- X-Men Unlimited (1993)
