= Lost in Space (comics) =

1991 comic book by Innovation Comics

Publication information
- Publisher: Innovation Comics
- Schedule: Monthly
- Genre: Science-fiction
- Publication date: 1991
- Main character(s): John Robinson, Maureen Robinson, Don West, Judy Robinson, Penny Robinson, Dr. Zachary Smith, The Robot

Creative team
- Created by: Irwin Allen
- Written by: Billy Mumy; Kevin Burns
- Artist(s): Michael Dutkiewicz

Lost in Space was a comic book published by Innovation Comics, based upon the television series Lost in Space. It utilized the settings and characters from the series, but was set years after the end of the series, and featured older characters coming to terms with being cut off from Earth for so many years.

== History ==
In the 1980s, Bill Mumy (who played Will Robinson on the series) had tried, and failed, to convince Irwin Allen to allow production of a Lost in Space film for theatres or TV. In 1991, a fledgling publisher called Innovation Comics began to produce an ambitious, high-quality Lost in Space comic, which was authorized and licensed. It was scripted by Mumy himself, and his intention was to reflect the more serious tone of the first season episodes, but this was somewhat undercut by artwork that sexualized the characters of Judy and Penny Robinson, prompting some exasperated notes from Mumy in the editorial pages.

The comic also established a romantic triangle between Judy, Penny (now depicted as someone in her late teens), and Don that was not present in the original series.

One storyline in this comic book retcons the "serious episodes" - which some critics claim ended about a third of the way through the first season - as excerpts from Prof. Robinson's log, while the more humorous episodes were taken from Penny's diary. Also suggested is the idea that Dr. Smith is working with some of the aliens encountered in the early episodes, rather than with any terrestrial source, as evidenced by his efforts to make radio contact with some third party after the Jupiter II has left Earth.

Lost in Space was Innovation's best selling property, outselling all their other comics combined. The comic only managed to run for 18 issues, 2 annuals and 1 of 2 issues of a miniseries however, but not because of poor sales. Innovation's ambitious projects couldn't keep ahead of their bottom line, and the company went out of business.

While this left a major story arc unresolved, a trade paperback entitled "Voyage to the Bottom of the Soul" was later published, completing the story.

== Other Lost In Space comics ==
=== Movie Adapatation ===
In 1998 Dark Horse Comics published a tie-in comic based on that year's Lost in Space film which ran for three issues.

=== The Lost Adventures ===
Irwin Allen's Lost in Space: The Lost Adventures were a series of comics published in 2016 by American Gothic Press, based on two unused scripts for the original series, "The Curious Galactics" and "Malice in Wonderland" by Carey Wilbur. These never filmed scripts were adapted by Holly Interlandi into a series of comics, with art by Kostas Pantoulas and Patrick McEvoy. While "The Curious Galactics" was originally a First Season script, both stories are presented as being set after the events of Season Three.

=== Netflix Reboot ===
A new comic based on the reboot of Lost in Space, sub-titled Countdown to Danger was published in four parts during 2019. The new comic is written by Richard Dinnick and Brian Buccellato with art by Zid.

== Related comics ==
A comic book named Space Family Robinson was published by Gold Key Comics and written by Gaylord DuBois. The Robinsons were: scientist father Craig, scientist mother June, early teens Tim (son) and Tammy (daughter), along with pets Clancy (dog) and Yakker (parrot). They lived in "Space Station One", a spacious moving craft with hydroponic gardens, observatory, and 2 small shuttle crafts ("Spacemobiles"). In the second issue, a cosmic storm deposited them far from Earth and they have adventures while they try to work their way home. That comic book is not a spinoff of the TV series but was in print prior to the conception of the show.

Space Family Robinson was published by Whitman and distributed by Western Publishing and sold for 60 cents each. They featured captions on their front covers such as #58's:

"An Emergency Landing on a War-Torn Planet Brings the Robinsons their strangest experience in Space!"

They were also sold in plastic packages of three comic books for $1.39 ($1.80 value) with other titles in the package such as Buck Rogers #14 and Doctor Solar #30.

In 1966 the weekly UK publication Lady Penelope, the comic for girls who love television, printed Space Family Robinson stories. These used the same characters and technology as the Gold Key titles but were original scripts, not reprints. Authorship is not known for certain, although there is good reason to think that some may have been written by then sub-editor on Lady Penelope, Brian Woodford. The artist was John Burns.

== See also ==
- List of comics based on television programs
