= Dragon Prince (comics) =

Publication information
- Publisher: Top Cow Productions
- Schedule: Monthly
- Format: Mini-series
- Genre: Fantasy
- Publication date: September 2008 -
- No. of issues: 4

Creative team
- Written by: Ron Marz
- Artist: Lee Moder
- Letterer: Troy Peteri
- Colorist: Val Staples
- Editor: Rob Levin

Dragon Prince is a four-issue comic book mini-series written by Ron Marz and drawn by Lee Moder. It is published by Top Cow Productions.

== Plot ==
Dragon Prince is the story of Aaron Chiang, an American teenager of Chinese descent, who discovers that he is the Dragon Prince, last of a fabled and mystical bloodline that hails its roots to the regal dragons of lore. When he accidentally triggers his dragon powers during a brawl with a schoolyard bully, Aaron is as surprised as the onlookers. He confronts his mother who reveals to Aaron that his real father was a dragon, and Aaron was the Dragon Prince, the last living dragon. But by accessing his dragon powers, Aaron has come under the crosshairs of a secret cabal of wizards, who have hunted dragons to virtual extinction since time immemorial.

The last chance of survival for the dragons is now in Aaron's hands as he must not only survive, but come to terms with the power he commands.

== Reception ==
Aimed at an all-ages audience, Dragon Prince #1 and #2 are out now (as of November 2008) and have received favorable responses from critics and readers.
