= Batman/Aliens =

1997 crossover comic book

- Cover of the trade paperback collection of the first miniseries. Art by Bernie Wrightson.
- Publisher: Dark Horse Comics; DC Comics

Batman/Aliens

Series publication information
- Schedule: Monthly
- Format: Mini-series
- Publication date: (vol. 1); March – April 1997 (vol. 2); December 2002 – February 2003
- Number of issues: 2 (vol. 1); 3 (vol. 2)

Creative team
- Writer(s): Ron Marz (vol. 1); Ian Edginton (vol. 2)
- Penciller(s): Bernie Wrightson (vol. 1); Staz Johnson (vol. 2)
- Colorist(s): Gregory Wright (vol. 1 – 2); Digital Chameleon (vol. 2)

Collected editions
- Batman/Aliens: ISBN 1-56971-305-7
- Batman/Aliens Two: ISBN 1-4012-0081-8
- DC Comics/Dark Horse: Aliens: ISBN 1401266363

Batman/Aliens is a crossover between the Batman and Aliens comic book franchises. It was published in 1997. A sequel was released in 2003.

== Batman/Aliens ==
Batman parachutes into the jungle near the Guatemala and Mexico borderline, investigating the disappearance of a Wayne Enterprises geologist. He encounters an American Special Ops team hunting a target, and both are set upon by the Aliens. Several members of the team are killed, but along the way Batman becomes familiar with the Aliens' life cycle, and collects two facehuggers in specimen jars.

The team leader sacrifices himself to blow up a nest of the Aliens, leaving only Batman and two members of the team alive, making their way to the team's evacuation point. One of the survivors, an intensely ambitious woman named Hyatt, leaves her teammate to be killed by one of the last Aliens and ambushes Batman, holding him at gunpoint while she relieves him of the lost geologist's voice recorder and one of the specimen jars. She says that the Aliens are an incredibly potent weapon if properly used, and bringing the information about them back to the U.S. government will make her career. She is so fixated on Batman that she fails to notice a gargantuan Alien hybrid – the result of an Alien embryo being implanted into a crocodile – rise behind her. The hybrid kills Hyatt, but Batman kills the creature by tying its legs and tipping it into the mouth of an active volcano. Alone, he escapes from the jungle.

In the Batcave, Bruce Wayne listens to the geologist's last message to his family, cut off as the man is attacked by an Alien. Bruce decides to drop the specimen jars containing the facehuggers into the cave's depths and tell no one about them. The Aliens are much too dangerous, he believes, "not because of what they are, but because of what we are".

This story was spun off of a two-part short story featured in Dark Horse Presents #101–102 entitled Aliens: Incubation. The events that Batman discovers on the geologist's recordings are fully depicted in this short story.

== Batman/Aliens II ==
In 1927, an explorer discovered something frozen in the ice in Antarctica, and he brought it home to Gotham City. In the present day, a construction crew breaks open the basement of a derelict building, and find the explorer's remains, realizing that he sealed himself inside his lab with what killed him – the Alien that attacks the construction workers then escapes into the city.

After a desperate struggle throughout Gotham, Batman is able to kill the alien, find its nest, and arrange for three victims to have the embryos extracted before they can hatch. He insists that the dead Alien and embryos be destroyed, but instead they are confiscated by Dr. Fortune, an army scientist, ignoring Batman's warnings. When the Aliens attack Arkham Asylum, Batman is able to fight them off using Mister Freeze's gun and a suit of powered armor, but he is subsequently captured by Fortune.

Awakening on Fortune's base on a disused oil rig, Batman finds himself confronted by Alien/human hybrids created from DNA samples extracted from the Arkham inmates (Joker, Two-Face, Scarecrow, Mr. Freeze, and Poison Ivy). Fortune has already tested their abilities against special forces operatives from all major nations. Despite the odds against him, Batman is able to defeat the hybrids by using his knowledge of the original Aliens' abilities and the emotional foibles of their human donors, allowing him to trap them all in an area of the rig after he triggers an explosion. Confronting Fortune, Batman learns that she plans to use the Alien/supervillain hybrids to keep the superheroes in check, as various governments fear what will happen if the superheroes ever go rogue.

Fortune also reveals that she was a member of the original explorer's expedition in 1927, and has been "host" to an Alien queen embryo since then. A form of dry leprosy she contracted before being implanted prevented the queen from hatching, while allowing her to use some of its abilities and extending her lifespan. She believes that she can successfully "harness" the Arkham inmates' extraordinary abilities for her hybrids without their insanity, and that the hybrids' Alien natures make them naturally loyal to her as the "queen". However, when she reveals her latest hybrid, created with DNA from Killer Croc, Batman warns her that Croc is already too animalistic and vicious to feel any loyalty towards her. She defies his warning by standing before the hybrid and trying to issue a command to it. It responds by tearing her head off.

Batman escapes the rig after triggering an explosion that destroys the platform and all the remaining hybrids. He reflects that he will have to watch his step, as Fortune was being backed by some very powerful, influential people, though Batman has no idea who they might be.

== Collected editions ==
The stories have been collected into trade paperbacks:

- Batman/Aliens (by Ron Marz and Bernie Wrightson, 128 pages, 1998, Titan Books, ISBN 1-85286-887-2, Dark Horse, ISBN 1-56971-305-7)
- Batman/Aliens II (by Ian Edginton and Staz Johnson, 160 pages, 2003, Titan Books, ISBN 1-84023-734-1, DC, ISBN 1-4012-0081-8)
- DC Comics/Dark Horse: Aliens (by Ian Edginton, Ron Marz, James Hodgkins, Staz Johnson, Kevin Nowlan, Chris Sprouse, Bernie Wrightson, 400 Pages, 2016, DC Comics/Dark Horse, ISBN 1401266363)

== See also ==
- Batman: Dead End, a fan film where Batman fights groups of both the Predators and Aliens.
- Batman Versus Predator, a comic book confrontation with the Predator
- Aliens, a line of comics from Dark Horse
- Superman and Batman versus Aliens and Predator (by Mark Schultz and Ariel Olivetti, two-issue miniseries, January 2007)
