= Aliens versus Predator versus The Terminator =

2000 comic miniseries

- Cover for Aliens versus Predator versus The Terminator #1

Publication information
- Publisher: Dark Horse Comics
- Format: Miniseries
- Genre: Science fiction
- Publication date: April–July 2000
- No. of issues: 4
- Main character(s): Alien; Predator; Terminator

Creative team
- Written by: Mark Schultz
- Penciller(s): Mel Rubi
- Inker(s): Chris Ivy
- Letterer(s): Pat Brosseau
- Colorist(s): Dave Stewart

Collected editions
- Aliens versus Predator versus The Terminator: ISBN 1-56971-568-8

Aliens versus Predator versus The Terminator is a comic published by Dark Horse Comics about fictional characters from three separate movie series: Alien, Predator, and Terminator. The series was in four parts, with parts 2–4 having a tagline on their cover.

== Plot ==
The story begins with a community residing in a sewer at an undisclosed location (possibly on Earth). The characters, including Annalee Call (Winona Ryder's character from Alien Resurrection) find Ripley #8, a clone of Ellen Ripley (also from Alien Resurrection). Call then takes Ripley back to her base of operations. She informs Ripley of a new military operation on the science station Typhoon, involving a hybrid Alien super soldier, led by a Dr. Trollenberg. When Ripley refuses, Call blackmails her into assisting. Meanwhile, Dr. Trollenberg works on the super soldier. He is approached by General Helm, who is in charge of the station, and wants to shut down the project since Trollenberg requested cybernetic components. After killing the general and his guards, Trollenberg then impersonates his victim by changing his voice. At the same time, a Predator travels the Typhoon, intent on hunting the super soldier.

Call and her crew, Ripley included, infiltrate the station in disguise. After guards, they move into Trollenberg's lab. Trollenberg proceeds to kill two of Call's crew before the cloaked Predator decapitates him. Now de-cloaked, the Predator fights the super-soldier. The latter is impervious to harm and able to absorb metal objects to regenerate damage. The super-soldier dispatches his foe, but causes a breach in the station's hull in doing so.

The crew escape to their shuttle (Carthage) with Trollenberg's head before the space station explodes from the breach, while the super soldier boards a smaller science vessel/escape pod, taking with it some alien chestbursters. In the 'science pod', the super soldier commences work on a second super soldier who was also near completion.

Call hacks into Trollenberg's skull to learn more about him. Inside Trollenberg's memory, she finds an interactive recording of John Connor in the 21st century, who tells her of the Crypto Terminators, of which Trollenberg was one, who could assimilate among humans in order to establish a new generation later.

After Call logs out, three Predator spacecraft surround their ship. Three Predators teleport on board and take Ripley prisoner. Elsewhere, the science pod reaches its destination, the Navy heavy cruiser Euphrates. The prototype disembarks, now accompanied by a new super soldier.

On the Carthage, Call surmises that the Predators knew of Ripley's genetic heritage, just as they did, and that they most likely want her to assist in the threat posed by the super soldiers; she decides they must use all this new information to their advantage.

On a Predator ship, Ripley finds a trophy room filled with Xenomorph relics. She understands that the Predators' lives revolve around the Aliens and that they know that both the super soldier and she are part Alien. She is taken to a circular operating table and tied down whilst a breathing apparatus is attached to her face, followed by a thin needle drill moving towards her.

On the Euphrates, the ship's commanding officer complains about the "android survivors", who he does not trust. The super soldiers have requested to be transferred to a high security asteroid facility. A message arrives from Command, refusing the super soldiers access to the Black Asteroid. The super soldiers then kill the crew present. The prototype super soldier begins to absorb parts of the cruiser's interior, resulting in critical damage to the ship's primary systems, including life support.

On the Carthage, Call has determined that the Predators would be following the most likely course of the super soldier towards the nearest large source of Aliens' genetic material: Los Alamos 235 a.k.a. the Black Asteroid. On the Predators' spacecraft, Ripley has a dream in which she relives Aliens encounters and finds a ghostly image of a traditional Terminator endoskeleton. Now awake, Ripley notices a scar on her neck. She is led from the operating table, to a viewing screen of Los Alamos 235. She senses that there are Aliens within and that the Predators extracted this information from her DNA, from the Alien genetic memory.

Nearby, the Euphrates is granted access to the Black Asteroid and opens fire on the station's control room. In the Predators' craft, Ripley undergoes a pre-battle ritual where she is given an Alien tooth necklace and is covered in Predator blood warpaint. The super soldiers take control of the ship and make their way to a room filled with fully-grown Aliens in containment tubes.

The next day, hidden amongst the smaller asteroids around Los Alamos 235, the Carthage crew watch the space surrounding the Black Asteroid. An entire fleet of military ships have arrived to retake the station only to be wiped out by a powerful energy surge. The Carthage moves towards the station, entering unnoticed through the entry point as Call wonders whether the Predators have already made it here and if Ripley is still alive.

Inside, Ripley plays dead as a monstrous super soldier crouches over her. In a flashback, she remembers entering the asteroid, remembering how they entered the asteroid, slipping unnoticed past its defenses and the fleet outside. In less than 24 hours, the two super soldiers had created an entire sophisticated manufacturing plant which quickly grew more of the new blue-skinned hybrids. The Terminators had won against the Predator foes. But Ripley, in a desperate gambit, releases the Aliens from their containment tubes. The tide then turns against the Terminators due to their vulnerability to the aliens' acidic blood.

Rounding a corner, Ripley finds Call and Voorman. Ripley says she will stay and fight. Voorman then drags Call back to the Carthage and stops her from trying to rescue Ripley. Call feels a sense of responsibility for getting Ripley involved in this mess. Meanwhile, Ripley slips on board the ship and the hybrid prototype also boards.

The Carthage exits the station, followed by the super soldier's ship, just as it explodes. Onboard, Ripley stalks the prototype, moving through the ship's internal piping. She leaps forward to kill the prototype with a Predator knife, but that does not work. Deciding to go with Plan B, Ripley cuts her arm with the blade. Ripley's blood burns through the viewing panel of the airlock door, causing flames from the explosion that surrounded the ship to flood in, resulting in its destruction.

On the Carthage, Call observes the explosion and comments that Ripley finished the job. They set a course for home.

== Collected editions ==
The work has been collected as a trade paperback:

- Aliens versus Predator versus The Terminator (Dark Horse Comics, 96 pages, 2001, ISBN 1-56971-568-8)

== See also ==
Other related comic series include:

- Alien
- Predator
- Alien vs. Predator
- Terminator
