= Randy Stradley =

American comic book writer and editor (born 1956)

Randy Stradley (born March 4, 1956) is an American comic book writer and editor, who spent 35 years in an executive position at Dark Horse Comics. He has written under pseudonyms Mick Harrison and Welles Hartley.

== Career ==
Stradley began working in comics in 1984 with issue 86 of Marvel's Star Wars. In 1986, he co-founded Dark Horse Comics with Mike Richardson and became its vice president.

In 1988, Dark Horse acquired the rights to Twentieth Century Fox's Aliens franchise and a year later the Predator license. In 1990, Stradley wrote the crossover, Aliens Versus Predator.

In the early 1990s Dark Horse acquired the license for Star Wars comics and relaunched the line. Stradley and Richardson co-wrote the Crimson Empire miniseries, and in 2002 Stradley became Senior Editor for Dark Horse's Star Wars series, a role he retained until 2014, when Marvel regained the Star Wars comics rights.

Stradley retired from Dark Horse on February 26, 2021.

He was nominated for "Best Editor" in the Eisner Awards in 1992.

== Works ==
=== Aliens Versus Predator ===
- Aliens Versus Predator (1990)
- Aliens Versus Predator: Duel (1995)
- Aliens Versus Predator: War (1995)
- Aliens Versus Predator: Three World War (2010)

=== Marvel Star Wars ===
- Star Wars 86: The Alderaan Factor (1984)

=== Crimson Empire (with Mike Richardson) ===
- Crimson Empire (1997–1998)
- Crimson Empire II: Council of Blood (1998–1999)
- Crimson Empire III: Empire Lost (2011–2012)

=== Dark Times ===
- Star Wars: Dark Times 1: The Path to Nowhere, Part 1 (as "Welles Hartley" and "Mick Harrison")
- Star Wars: Dark Times 2: The Path to Nowhere, Part 2 (as "Welles Hartley" and "Mick Harrison")
- Star Wars: Dark Times 3: The Path to Nowhere, Part 3 (as "Welles Hartley" and "Mick Harrison")
- Star Wars: Dark Times 4: The Path to Nowhere, Part 4 (as "Welles Hartley" and "Mick Harrison")
- Star Wars: Dark Times 5: The Path to Nowhere, Part 5 (as "Welles Hartley" and "Mick Harrison")
- Star Wars: Dark Times 6: Parallels, Part 1 (as "Mick Harrison")
- Star Wars: Dark Times 7: Parallels, Part 2 (as "Mick Harrison")
- Star Wars: Dark Times 8: Parallels, Part 3 (as "Mick Harrison")
- Star Wars: Dark Times 9: Parallels, Part 4 (as "Mick Harrison")
- Star Wars: Dark Times 10: Parallels, Part 5 (as "Mick Harrison")
- Star Wars: Dark Times 11: Vector, Part 5 (as "Mick Harrison")
- Star Wars: Dark Times 12: Vector, Part 6 (as "Mick Harrison")
- Star Wars: Dark Times 13: Blue Harvest, Part 1 (as "Mick Harrison")
- Star Wars: Dark Times 14: Blue Harvest, Part 2 (as "Mick Harrison")
- Star Wars: Dark Times 15: Blue Harvest, Part 3 (as "Mick Harrison")
- Star Wars: Dark Times 16: Blue Harvest, Part 4 (as "Mick Harrison")
- Star Wars: Dark Times 17: Blue Harvest, Part 5 (as "Mick Harrison")

=== Empire ===
- Star Wars: Empire 5: Princess... Warrior, Part 1 (2003)
- Star Wars: Empire 6: Princess... Warrior, Part 2 (2003)
- Star Wars: Empire 16: To the Last Man, Part 1 (as "Welles Hartley")
- Star Wars: Empire 17: To the Last Man, Part 2 (as "Welles Hartley")
- Star Wars: Empire 18: To the Last Man, Part 3 (as "Welles Hartley")
- Star Wars: Empire 22: Alone Together (as "Welles Hartley")
- Star Wars: Empire 36: The Wrong Side of the War, Part 1 (as "Welles Hartley")
- Star Wars: Empire 37: The Wrong Side of the War, Part 2 (as "Welles Hartley")
- Star Wars: Empire 38: The Wrong Side of the War, Part 3 (as "Welles Hartley")
- Star Wars: Empire 39: The Wrong Side of the War, Part 4 (as "Welles Hartley")
- Star Wars: Empire 40: The Wrong Side of the War, Part 5 (as "Welles Hartley")

=== Jedi Council ===
- Jedi Council: Acts of War 1
- Jedi Council: Acts of War 2
- Jedi Council: Acts of War 3
- Jedi Council: Acts of War 4

=== Republic ===
- Star Wars: Republic 67: Forever Young (2004)
- Star Wars: Republic 79: Into the Unknown, Part 1 (as "Welles Hartley")
- Star Wars: Republic 80: Into the Unknown, Part 2 (as "Welles Hartley")

=== Star Wars Tales ===
- Jedi Chef—Star Wars Tales 7 in Star Wars Tales 7 (2001)

=== The Bounty Hunters ===
- The Bounty Hunters: Kenix Kil (1999)

=== Other ===
- Clone Wars Adventures (2004–2007)
- Hide in Plain Sight—Star Wars: Clone Wars Adventures Volume 2 (as "Welles Hartley")
- Hard Currency
- Routine Valor (2006)
- Star Wars: Panel to Panel
- Star Wars: Panel to Panel Volume 2: Expanding the Universe
- Star Wars: The Clone Wars –Innocents of Ryloth (co-writer)
