= Mindhunter (comics) =

Comic book miniseries

Publication information
- Publisher: Top Cow; Dark Horse
- Schedule: Monthly
- Format: Miniseries
- Publication date: 2000–2001
- No. of issues: 3

Creative team
- Written by: David Quinn
- Penciller: Mel Rubi
- Inker: Mike Perkins
- Letterer: Clem Robins
- Colorist: Dan Jackson
- Editor: Phil Amara

Mindhunter is a three-issue comic book miniseries published by Dark Horse Comics.

It features a crossover between the comic book characters Witchblade and the Darkness as well as the film properties Aliens and Predator. The series was written by David Quinn, with pencils by Mel Rubi, inks by Mike Perkins and cover art by Eric Kohler.
