= Fire and Stone =

Comic book series

- Cover to the first issue of Prometheus: Fire and Stone. Art by David Palumbo.

Publication information
- Publisher: Dark Horse Comics
- Format: Comic book limited series
- Genre: Science fiction, horror
- Publication date: September 2014 – February 2015
- No. of issues: 17
- Main characters: Galgo Helder; Angela Foster; Elden; Francis Lane; Derrick Russell; Ahab

Creative team
- Written by: Paul Tobin; Kelly Sue DeConnick
- Artists: Juan Ferreyra; David Palumbo

Collected editions
- Prometheus: The Complete Fire and Stone: ISBN 978-1-63008-445-5

Fire and Stone (also known as Prometheus: Fire and Stone, Aliens: Fire and Stone, Alien vs. Predator: Fire and Stone, Predator: Fire and Stone, and Omega: Fire and Stone) is a comic book series crossover set in the fictional universe of the Alien vs. Predator franchise. It was first published by Dark Horse Comics in the fall of 2014 and continued until 2015 and was followed by the crossover comic book series Life and Death (2016–2017). The comic book series is considered part of the extended universe of the Alien and Predator franchises, being set after the events of Prometheus.

== Summary ==
The main storyline begins after the end of the Prometheus film and continues across different eras, such as that of Aliens, involving different characters from those seen in each film series. The comic series is divided into four mini-series related to each franchise. Each mini-series is composed of four issues. A final, double-sized issue that gives closure to the main storyline was also produced. The series ties in popular franchises such as Predator and remarks on the origins of the Aliens, and Engineers.

Promotional image.

== Plot ==
=== Fire and Stone – Prometheus ===
An expedition, led by Captain Angela, travels to the planet LV-223. The group surveys the planet, finding remnants of a black goo which caused the barren planet to evolve into a jungle with alien lifeforms, including the Alien.

Francis, a scientist on the survey team, and synth Elden find discovery notes on the black goos power to cause rapid evolution. The survey team find an Engineer ship along the way and encounter an Engineer. Galgo finds and keeps an Engineer's gun. The survey team also discover the Engineers laboratory where they were breeding aliens. Dying of cancer, Francis injects the black goo into Elden to visualise what the effects would be. Elden then transforms into a human-robotic hybrid and subsequently chases down Francis after feeling betrayed by her.

The survey team fight different aliens on their journey, while responding to their landed shuttle craft now under attack by the same aliens. Angela orders Galgo to apprehend Francis due to his experiment on Elden. Elden has since been evolving further into a merged flesh and metal being and leads aliens into the shuttle craft where the aliens kill the crew. During this time, Galgo commandeers a rescue shuttle with 2 other team mates and escapes the planet. The remaining survey team survivors Angela and 2 others then set off to safety where Francis originally discovered a base camp of scientific information regarding the black blob and relax.

=== Fire and Stone – Aliens ===
Set concurrently around the same time as Aliens, the narrative begins prior to the arrival of the colonial marines as seen in the film, during the Xenomorph infestation of the Hadley's Hope colony on LV-426. As the Xenomorphs ravage the colony, engineer Derrick Russell and greenhouse specialist Genevieve Dione attempt to lead other colonists to safety. To do so, they seek to acquire transportation to evacuate survivors from the surface. The survivors enlist the help of Nolan Cale, a scavenger and pilot in possession of a small freighter known as the Onager. However, the Onager is only capable of short-range flights, imposing constraints on the survivors' escape plan. While the colonists board the freighter, Cale notices several xenomorphs that manage to stow away aboard one of the ship's cargo bulkheads. However, afraid of being marooned on LV-426 should he remain behind to decouple the infested cargo bulkhead, Cale abstains from informing the survivors and gives the all-clear for the ship to depart.

Because of the ship's limited flight range, the Onager lands on LV-223, a nearby planetoid within the same sector as LV-426. The survivors plan to hold out with the provisions aboard the ship and use a distress beacon to flag down rescue. However, the colonists inadvertently unlock the infested cargo bulkhead, and the concealed xenomorphs emerge, killing some of the survivors. Outmatched and helpless, the survivors are forced to abandon their supplies and flee into the nearby jungle.

Over the next several weeks, the group continues to traverse the surface of LV-223, constantly being pursued by the xenomorphs. As the survivors' numbers dwindle, Dione, becoming the group's self-appointed leader, urges that they erect defenses and frequently seek safety whenever possible. However, Cale dissents and insists that the remaining survivors mount an offensive to reclaim the supplies from the Onager and kill the xenomorphs.

As Cale and Dione continue to bicker over the group's course of action, and the xenomorphs continue to whittle down the group's numbers, Russell becomes increasingly distant from the group affairs. Having stumbled upon a probe from the Prometheus expedition decades ago, Russell analyzes the data from the probe and finds that the current landscape of LV-223 has changed drastically from what it was at the time of the previous expedition. Russell deduces that the enigmatic black substance that the members of the Prometheus expedition encountered acted as a catalyst that expedited the evolution of the environment on the planet from a barren, rocky wasteland to a lush jungle setting. Russell also explores a crashed ship of the Engineer species, and finds a dormant Engineer in stasis, although much to his dismay, he is unable to wake it. Russell continues to compile his findings in a cave situated within a mountain that the xenomorphs are wary of approaching. Although he reports his discoveries to the group, Russell's findings are dismissed as unimportant in comparison to the immediate goal of survival.

As the group endeavors to survive by scavenging for food, a few of the members on a fishing excursion at a lake are attacked by xenomorphs. One of the survivors, Luis, is dragged beneath the lake after a scuffle with a xenomorph and in the process, both are fused together as one organism- a product of the black substance that Russell is investigating. After Cale kills the Luis-xenomorph hybrid, Cale is unable to withstand his emotions of guilt and confesses to the group of his role in the group's dire situation, having failed to inform them during the escape from LV-426 of the presence of xenomorphs aboard the Onager. An enraged Dione berates him for his incompetence, but Cale vows to redeem himself by leading a group of survivors to attack the xenomorphs guarding the Onager and recovering the distress transmitter. Cale and his group ultimately fail in their attempt, and during the battle, he is exposed to the black substance.

The mutated Cale leads the xenomorphs back to the survivors' camp, where a massacre ensues as Dione and the last of the survivors are wiped out. Russell, now the sole remaining member of the group, continues to take refuge in his cave and focuses on his studies of the LV-223 environment. However, as the days pass, he becomes increasingly unstable and erratic from weeks of isolation, and a diagnosis from the probe reveals that he is afflicted with brain tumors. Russell also notes that the mutant Cale experiences conflict with the xenomorphs.

Russell buries the deceased members of the group, but is assaulted by Cale, who Russell kills with a stake. The struggle attracts the attention of the xenomorphs, and as Russell attempts to flee, he becomes injured and is unable to reach his mountain hideout. With the xenomorphs poised for the kill, and a puddle of the black substance within reach, Russell reaches out, believing that it can save him. The narrative cuts off as the xenomorphs emit a roar, leaving Russell's fate unknown.

=== Fire and Stone – Alien vs. Predator ===
Following the events of Fire and Stone - Prometheus, Galgo since escaped the planet LV-223 with Francis apprehended along with 2 other survivors is pursued by Elden who has since taken over the original space ship the crew arrived on the planet with, with aliens onboard. Elden is now rapidly evolving into a more stronger being and more humanlike. The aliens from planet LV-223 also seem to ignore or listen to him for the most part. Elden then uses the capital ship to remotely power down systems on the shuttlecraft piloted by Galgo and requests Francis as ransom. Galgo then takes a spare shuttlecraft and arrives on the capital ship. At the same time, the predators can be seen onboard the capital ship.

Elden follows Francis and Galgo back to the ship, unleashing the pack of xenomorphs upon the ship. Galgo gives up Francis, abandoning him for Elden to find. Amidst the chaos, a hunting party of predators shows up to hunt the xenomorphs. Galgo and his crew retreat, being unknowingly followed by one of the predators. Meanwhile, the predators encounter Elden. They shoot him, to no effect. When one attempts to tackle him, he sprouts a mouth on his stomach, and bites it. He violently kills another, prompting another predator to mark him with the blood of a xenomorph. The Predator proceeds to offer up his ritual knife as a trophy, with Elden rejecting it. Elden proceeds on his mission to find Francis. Suddenly the xenomorphs turn on Elden, nearly injuring him. One of the predators saves Elden from his attackers and lends him a weapon. The predator accidentally breaches the hull of the ship, killing itself. Elden floats back to the ship, to resume his search. Francis hides in the vents, dying of cancer. He briefly encounters Elden, but escapes. Elden later gets onto Francis's trail, when Francis springs a trap on him, taking some of his blood, in hopes it would cure him. Elden yells at him that he will feel nothing but pain, but Francis injects the blood into himself anyway. He begins to violently mutate. Meanwhile, the predator that was bitten by Elden mutates and kills a member of its hunting party. Elden and Francis encounter the creature, and fight it. They win by ripping it in half. Francis starts to die. As he dies he tells Elden that he is his legacy, and that he should do as he chooses with his eternal life.

=== Fire and Stone – Predator ===
A Predator named "Ahab" hides in invisibility among the crew of the ship escaping Elden's command ship. Ahab fights and traps Galgo forcing him to descend to planet LV-223 so that it may hunt the Engineer on the planet. Tethering Galgo to himself through Ahab's wrist attachment the pair descend to planet LV-223 where after a series of encounters with aliens and also the former crew from Fire and Stone – Prometheus, the pair eventually lure the Engineer onto the ship they arrived in and detonate it. Without a way to escape the planet Ahab then parts ways with Galgo and continues to hunt beings on the planet, while Galgo reunited with former captain Angela continue on their unknown journey to safety.

=== Fire and Stone – Omega ===
Angela, along with Galgo and 2 other survivors are left surviving off any food they can acquire, with Ahab assisting them in hunting. Soon, Elden descends onto the planet in a crashed ship. The survivors, including Ahab, all plan to find a distress beacon in the mountain base. The characters then find a ship filled with aliens and after an encounter with them, continue along to the mountain base. The team uses the ship to puncture a hole into the mountain after which they come to the realisation the mountain is alive and evolved from the original Weyland-Yutani crashed vessel hosting Welyand himself. An encounter causes Elden to merge with the mountain to allow the characters to escape to the other side from which they end up against a barren landscape away from the evolved jungle landmass and into the moon's barren surface. The characters including Ahab stand against the backdrop pondering their fate.

== Background ==
Spanning four franchises, four different comic book series and five creative teams, Fire and Stone begins with writer Paul Tobin and artist Juan Ferreyra's Prometheus: Fire and Stone four issue mini-series. Ahead of its launch, publisher Dark Horse Comics released a trailer for the series, showing writers Tobin and Kelly Sue DeConnick, who writes the final leg of the overall storyline, talking about the origins of the series. The first issue of Prometheus: Fire and Stone was released on September 10, 2014. The complete collection was released on September 6, 2015 as Prometheus: The Complete Fire and Stone. The events of this series were further mentioned in the 2014 technical guide Alien: The Weyland-Yutani Report.

=== Titles ===
- Fire and Stone – Prometheus (1-4, 2014)
- Aliens: Field Report (2014)
- Fire and Stone – Aliens (1-4, 2014)
- Fire and Stone – Alien vs. Predator (1-4, 2014-2015)
- Fire and Stone – Predator (1-4, 2015)
- Fire and Stone – Omega (2015)

=== Collected editions ===
Each of the titles' franchises, like Aliens, have been collected as a trade paperback.

All the titles' franchises have been collected together in one single trade paperback:

- Prometheus: The Complete Fire and Stone (Dark Horse Comics, 508 pages, 2015, ISBN 978-1-63008-445-5)
