= Ghost (Dark Horse Comics) =

Comic book character

- Ghost Special #2, featuring Yvonne Epstein on the cover.

Publication information
- Publisher: Dark Horse Comics
- First appearance: Comics' Greatest World: Arcadia Week 3
- Created by: Team CGW

In-story information
- Alter ego: Elisa Cameron
- Team affiliations: Barb Wire, X
- Abilities: Flight, invisibility, phasing, teleportation
Ghost
Publication information
- Genre: Superhero
- Publication date: 1995 – Feb 2015
- No. of issues: 36 (vol. 1), 22 (vol. 2), 4 (In the Smoke and Din), 12 (vol. 4)

Ghost is the fictional superhero of an eponymous comic book published by American company Dark Horse Comics. The character appeared in specials and monthly titles detailing the afterlife of Elisa Cameron and her search for the truth surrounding her (apparent) death.

Ghost first appeared in Comics' Greatest World, week three, in 1993. After a popular special in 1994, a monthly title devoted to the character began publication in 1995. It ran for 36 issues, followed by a six-month break and a second series of 22 issues. The second series was a continuation of the first with a number of changes, including new details about Ghost's origin. The stories in both series were based in (and around) the city of Arcadia, in a self-contained fictional universe outlined in Dark Horse's Comics' Greatest World.

Ghost continued appearing in her own titles (and others) into the 2000s, including several crossovers unrelated to Comics' Greatest World. Most notable among these were a two-issue crossover with Dark Horse's Hellboy (Ghost/Hellboy), and a four-issue crossover with DC Comics' Batgirl (Ghost/Batgirl: The Resurrection Machine).

== Premise ==
The series takes place in Arcadia, which is intended to be a grim, yet Art Deco city, as reflected in the artwork of the early issues. The body of protagonist Elisa Cameron contains nanomites which give her spectral powers. She becomes an assassin and her memories are erased. Now having few memories, she believes she is an actual ghost and adopts the alias of "the Ghost" in order to carry out investigations.

== List of appearances ==
- Comics' Greatest World week 3 ("Arcadia: Ghost") (1993)
- Ghost Special (1994)
- Series 1: Issues #1-36 (1995–98)
- Ghost Special 2 ("Immortal Coil") (1998)
- Series 2: Issues #1-4
- Ghost Special 3 ("Scary Monsters") (1998)
- Series 3: Issues #5-22
- Ghost Handbook
- X #8 (written by Steven Grant, pencils by Matt Haley, inks by Tom Simmons)
- Ghost Omnibus Vol. 1 (2008) (reprints of Ghost Special 1, Series 1 issues #1-12 and A Decade of Dark Horse, issue #2. ISBN 978-1-59307-992-5)
- Ghost Omnibus Vol. 2 (2009) (reprints Series 1, issues #13–26. ISBN 978-1-59582-213-0)
- Dark Horse Presents (third series) #13 "Resurrection Mary" (written by Kelly Sue Deconnick, art by Phil Noto; serialized since June 2012)
- Ghost - In The Smoke And Din: 4-issue mini-series (written by Kelly Sue Deconnick, art by Phil Noto; serialized since October 2012)
- Ghost Omnibus Vol. 3 (2012) (reprints of Ghost Special 2–3, Series 1 issues #27–36, Ghost stories from Dark Horse Presents, issues #145–147. ISBN 978-1-59582-374-8)
- Ghost Omnibus Vol. 4 (2013) (reprints Series 2 issues #1-11 and the Ghost story from Dark Horse Presents Annual 1999. ISBN 978-1-61655-080-6)

=== Collaborations ===
- Ghost & The Shadow: Doug Moench (writer), H. M. Baker (pencils), Bernard Kolle (inks), Matt Haley and Tom Simmons (cover); one-issue special (1995)
- Ghost/Hellboy: Mike Mignola (writer and cover art), Scott Benefiel (pencils), Jason Rodriguez (inks); two issues (1996)
- Ghost/Batgirl: The Resurrection Machine: Four issues (2001)

== Characters ==
- Elisa Cameron (Ghost)

=== Family ===
- Earl Cameron (first appeared in Ghost Special)
- Margo Cameron (first appeared in Ghost Special)
- Dan Deerlane (first appeared in Volume Two)
- June Deerlane-Cameron (first appeared in Ghost Special)

=== Friends and allies ===
- The Furies (all-female group; first appeared in #11, Vol. 1):
  - Focus
  - Frenzy
  - Kinetic
  - Mindgame
- The Goblins (introduced in Vol. 1, #1 and #23)
- Hob (goblin, first appearing in Vol. 1, #28)
- Concordia Leveche (first appeared in Vol. 2)
- Peter Neville (first appeared in Vol. 1, #1)
- Nicola Provenzano (first appeared in Vol. 2)
- Jennifer Reading (first appeared in Vol. 1, #28)

=== Crossover characters ===
- The Shadow
- X (first series; appeared in #9, #15, #20–-27 and #32)
- Barb Wire (first series; appeared in #5, #17–19, Special #2)
- King Tiger (first series; appeared in #2–3, #11, #22–23, #25–27)
- Vortex (Vol. 2; introduced in Comics' Greatest World, Week 16)
- Cassandra Cain (Batgirl)
- Hellboy
- The Mask

=== Villains ===
- Crux (first appeared in Vol. 1, #10)
- Fear Demons
- Ghost Hunters (first appeared in Vol. 2)
- Ghost Killers
- Hunger (first appeared in Vol. 1, #6)
- The Incubi (first appeared in Vol. 1, #28)
- Krasher
- James MacCready (Ghost Special)
- Miasma (first appeared in Vol. 1, #13)
- Cameron Nemo (introduced in Vol. 1, #1)
- Doctor October (first appeared in Vol. 1, #6)
- Mr. Borazzon (Special 2)
- Mr. Park (first appeared in Vol. 1, #29)
- Archibald Scythe (first appeared in Vol. 1, #4)
- Shades (introduced in Vol. 1, #8)
- Silhouette (introduced in Vol. 1, #12)
- Snake (first appeared in Vol. 1, #1)
- Szothstromael Family (first appeared in Vol. 2, #7)
- The Trio:
  - Towering Chris
  - Malcolm Greymater
  - Coral ("Trixie") King
- Trouvaille (first major appearance in Vol. 1, #30)
- Joe Yimbo (pun on the Japanese Yojimbo; first appeared in 1994's Ghost Special)

== Series information ==
=== Volume one ===
==== Creators ====
The first key series and the first special (1995–1998) were written by Eric Luke. Below is a list of issues and their art teams; if a team (or individual) repeats, only last names will be used.

- Special: Matt Haley (pencils), Tom Simmons (inks), Adam Hughes (cover) (1994)
- 1–3: Adam Hughes (pencils), Mark Farmer (inks) (April–June 1995)
- 4: Haley and Simmons (July 1995)
- 5: Terry Dodson and Lee Moder (pencils), Gary Martin and Ande Parks (inks) (August 1995)
- 6–7: Scott Benefiel (pencils), Jasen Rodriguez (inks) (September–October 1995)
- 8: George Dove (pencils), Bernard Kolle (inks) (November 1995)
- 9: H.M. Baker (pencils), Bob Wiacek (inks) (December 1995)
- 10: Baker, Kolle (January 1996)
- 11: David Bullock (pencils), Gary Martin (inks) (February 1996)
- 12–13: Bullock, Randy Emberlin (inks) (March–April 1996)
- 14: Steve Yeowell (pencils), Emberlin (inks) (May 1996)
- 15-16: Doug Braithwaite (pencils), Emberlin (inks) (June–July 1996)
- 17: Ivan Reis (pencils), Barbara Kaalberg (inks) (August 1996)
- 18-25: Reis and Emberlin (September 1996–April 1997)
- 26: Benefiel and Rodriguez (May 1997)
- 27: John Cassaday (pencils), Martin (June 1997)
- 28-31: Reis and Emberlin (July–October 1997)
- 32: Baker and Kolle (November 1997)
- 33-36: Reis and Emberlin (December 1997–March 1998)

Covers for the series were rarely by the same artist as the issue itself. The following is a list of who did which covers; as above, full names will be used only at the first occurrence.

- 1–3, 5–7: Hughes
- 4: Haley and Simmons
- 8: Baker
- 9, 11, 17: Brian Apthorp and Martin
- 10, 12–14: Stan Manoukian and Vince Roucher
- 15: Benefiel and Rodriguez
- 16, 18: Braithwaite and Cam Smith
- 19: Jason Pearson
- 20-24: Cassady and Emberlin
- 25, 32: Imagemakers and David Stewart, with Yvonne Epstein modeling (photo cover)
- 26-27: Denis Beauvais
- 28-31: Chris Warner
- 33-36: Tony Harris

The series largely adopted a two- and four-issue story-arc structure for its final year.

==== Storylines ====
- Special, X #8, #1–12: Reporter Elisa Cameron is dead. She gradually reconciles with her sister Margo, and moves in with her and their newly-sober parents. Her parents are later murdered by a shadowy psionic to dissuade her from a news story she was investigating. Elisa has a fondness for jade, which prevents her from "ghosting" (passing through objects). She can teleport (which she calls "jumping"), but must pass a hellish region to do so. Elisa faces a number of psionics led by Dr. October, a woman who wanted to eliminate Elisa for her beauty even in death. She also must deal with a demon (Cameron Nemo), who escapes from her "hell" (causing a great deal of destruction), before King Tiger helps her defeat him. Elisa learns that her jumps, her hell and Nemo are figments of her imagination. She slowly introduces herself to Peter, a man she sees visiting the graveyard. Elisa's alliance with Barb Wire (a bounty hunter from Steel Harbor) results in her receiving a warning that Archibald Scythe (a psionic from her past) is coming for her. Margo falls under Scythe's spell, while an all-female paranormal team (the Furies) joins with Elisa to defeat him. Margo, driven by rage, summons up strange "shade-like" tears which defeat Scythe (but cost her her life).
- #13–25: Crux (the man responsible for the deaths of Elisa's parents) tries to remove Elisa, causing a panic in the underworld and seriously injuring Peter. Shortly afterwards Cameron Nemo escapes from hell and takes over Scythe's body, becoming a lurking presence in her afterlife. Aided by X, King Tiger and Focus (leader of the Furies), Elisa discovers a tape with evidence of her death. Tracing the tape to Crux (who is planning to invade a secret city beneath Arcadia and recover a key which will give him power), Elisa and her companions help the Goblins (living in the secret city) by defeating Crux. Just before his death, Crux admits that he caused everything—from her parents' murders to the psionic hunters and Elisa's death. Elisa then becomes Sentinel of Arcadia.
- #26–36: Dr. October resurfaces, but is quickly defeated. Peter and Elisa slowly develop a relationship while Elisa, aided by the Goblins, tries to protect the city. She encounters Dr. Trouvaille, who experiments with the spirits of his victims; he calls her "the failed one", hinting that he knows secrets unrevealed by Crux. Margo, somehow alive and possessed by a being known as Silhouette, tries to destroy Arcadia but is saved by Elisa.

=== Volume two ===
==== Creators ====
The series was re-launched in the fall of 1998 with a new creative staff. An attempt was made to make the artwork sleeker, sexier and more beautiful than the previous series. Like the first series, the second adapted a mini-series approach. The following is a list of the staff; when repeated, only the surname will be used:

- 1–6: Chris Warner (writer), Christian Zanier (pencils), Steve Moncuse (inks), Ryan Benjamin (covers)
- 7–10 ("Shifter"): Warner and Mike Kennedy (writers), Zanier (pencils), Moncuse (inks), Benjamin (covers)
- 11–15 (12–15, "Red Shadows"): Warner (writer), Benjamin (art)
- 16–17("When the Devil Daydreams"): Kennedy (writer), Francisco Ruiz Valesco and Benjamin (art)
- 18–19: Kennedy (writer), Benjamin (art), Denis Beauvais (cover)
- 20: Kennedy (writer), Benjamin (art)
- 21: Kennedy (writer), Benjamin (art), Beauvais (cover)
- 22: Kennedy (writer), Benjamin and Lucas Marangnon (pencils), Moncuse and Mike Henry (inks), Benjamin (cover)

==== Storylines ====
- #1–6: Elisa learns from the mysterious Concordia Leveche that she is not really dead. Instead, her "death" is linked to Scythe and Trouvaille (who are conducting experiments in which souls are stripped from their bodies, "rendered" and replaced with beings from another dimension). Trouvaille captures Elisa, and shows her the tape. From it, she learns that she killed Crux. Trouvaille, aided by Scythe, tries ripping Elisa's soul from her body, but during the procedure Cameron Nemo briefly appears. Elisa then vanishes. Silhouette is back in control of Margo's body while Margo's soul awaits rendering. Elisa escapes and fights Silhouette, who escapes (still controlling Margo's body). Elisa then kills Trouvaille. She has learned that Focus was in league with Trouvaille, and soon discovers the same is true of Peter. She suggests that he commit suicide, while Focus informs Elisa that she had been one of the Furies. Soon, she finds Cameron Scythe. Nemo (who reveals that as part of Elisa's subconscious he has always known her) is returned to Elisa's hell. Margo (now a being like Elisa) appears and shoots Scythe through the skull, killing him.
- #7–15: Elisa, Concordia and Margo go to Hoyo Grande to ask King Tiger for help. Instead, they help a depressed Tiger regain his energy and battle the shape-shifting Szothstromael clan. Elisa has a revelatory encounter with the man from the vortex, who "reboots" her brain. This enables her to remember that her biological father (Dan Deerlane) was shot by her adoptive father before her eyes when she was very young; the pain deadened her to that of others, leading to her life as a Fury assassin. Silhouette returns, using Trouvaille's technology to transfer more beings into the bodies of Scythe's remaining followers. Sent as ghost-hunters, they attack Elisa and her friends. Failing that, Trouvaille (whose body is dead but whose essence exists within his armor) joins them to defeat Elisa and complete his experiments. They take Margo and Concordia, but Peter returns to aid Elisa in her battle. Margo's body is recovered, Silhouette is defeated, and Trouvaille and the hunters appear to be eliminated. Giving Peter the brush-off, Elisa leaves with her newly revived sister.

==== Special issues ====
Two special issues were published after Eric Luke's series ended, written by writers who did not contribute to the regular series:

- Ghost Special 2 (Immortal Coil) (1998): Written by Martin Lodewyk, pencils by H. M. Baker, inks by Bernard Kolle, cover by Dave Stewart (featuring model Yvonne Epstein). Set some time after Silhouette appears, the Goblins have yet to return to Arcadia and a worried Elisa must rescue Barb Wire from a South American businessman (Mr. Borazzon).
- Ghost Special 3 (Scary Monsters) (1998): "Mayfly" written by Tom Sneigoski, "Secrets" written by Lee Swank. Both sections have pencils by H. M. Baker and inks by Bernard Kolle; cover by Baker and Kolle. In "Mayfly", Elisa battles large insect-like creatures controlled by a woman who wants revenge for an accident during her youth. In "Secrets", Elisa reflects on the secrets of people in Arcadia. A man she calls "Bookworm", while seemingly innocuous in breaking into the library to read ancient books every evening, is really planning to raise a demon.

=== Resurrection Mary ===
Ghost was revived as part of Dark Horse's Project Black Sky with a new storyline entitled "Resurrection Mary", which launched the third series in Dark Horse Presents #13 cover-dated June 2012. In the three-part serialized story, Elisa's spirit is revived when two investigators from a Ghost Hunters-like TV series, armed with an experimental piece of paranormal technology, investigate a cemetery where a woman in white (called "Resurrection Mary") has been spotted. Eliza appears to have lost her memory; she and the paranormal investigators she befriends cover up her self-defence killing and resolve to solve the mystery of her identity. A notable change for this reboot is that the traditional setting of Arcadia was replaced by Chicago, Illinois. The serial concluded with DHP #15, after which Dark Horse published Ghost #0 in September 2012; this reprinted the three DHP chapters as a prelude to a new series, Ghost: In the Smoke and Din.

=== Volume Three (In the Smoke and Din) ===
==== Creators ====
Dark Horse launched a third series, In the Smoke and Din, consisting of four issues published from September 2012. The writer was Kelly Sue DeConnick with art by Phil Noto (pencils).

=== Volume Four ===
==== Creators ====
Kelly Sue DeConnick returned in 2013 to write a second series for Dark Horse, ending in 2015 with issue #12. This series was collected as Ghost Volume 1–4. The following is a list of the staff; when repeated, only the surname will be used:

- 1 - 4, Kelly Sue DeConnick (writer), Chris Sebela (writer), Ryan Sook, Drew Johnson, Geraldo Borges (pencils), Richard Starkings (letters)
- 5 - 8, Chris Sebela (writer), Jan Duursema (pencils), Dan Parsons (inks), Richard Starkings (letters)
- 9 - 12, Chris Sebela (writer), Harvey Tolibao (pencils), Richard Starkings (letters)

== Collections ==
- Ghost Stories, Vol. 1, ISBN 978-1-56971-057-9
- Ghost Omnibus, Volume 1 ISBN 978-1-59307-992-5
- Ghost Omnibus, Volume 2 ISBN 978-1-59582-213-0
- Ghost/Batgirl: The Resurrection Machine ISBN 978-1-56971-570-3
- Ghost/Hellboy Special ISBN 978-1-56971-273-3
- Ghost Omnibus, Volume 3 ISBN 978-1-59582-374-8
- Ghost Omnibus, Volume 4 ISBN 978-1-61655-080-6
- Ghost Omnibus, Volume 5 ISBN 978-1-61655-383-8
- Ghost Volume 1: In the Smoke and Din ISBN 978-1-61655-121-6
- Ghost Volume 2: The White City Butcher ISBN 978-1-61655-420-0
- Ghost Volume 3: Against the Wilderness ISBN 978-1-61655-498-9
- Ghost Volume 4: A Death in the Family ISBN 978-1-61655-708-9

== Compendium Editions ==
- Ghost Compendium, volume 1, ISBN 978-1-5067-4661-6
- Ghost Compendium, volume 2, ISBN 978-1-5067-4662-3

== Adaptations ==
A duology of dramatised audio adaptations was produced by American audiobook company GraphicAudio in 2021.

== Reception ==
Ghost was ranked 15th on the Comics Buyer's Guide's "100 Sexiest Women in Comics" list.

== See also ==
- List of ghosts
