= Barbara Kesel =

American writer and editor of comic book

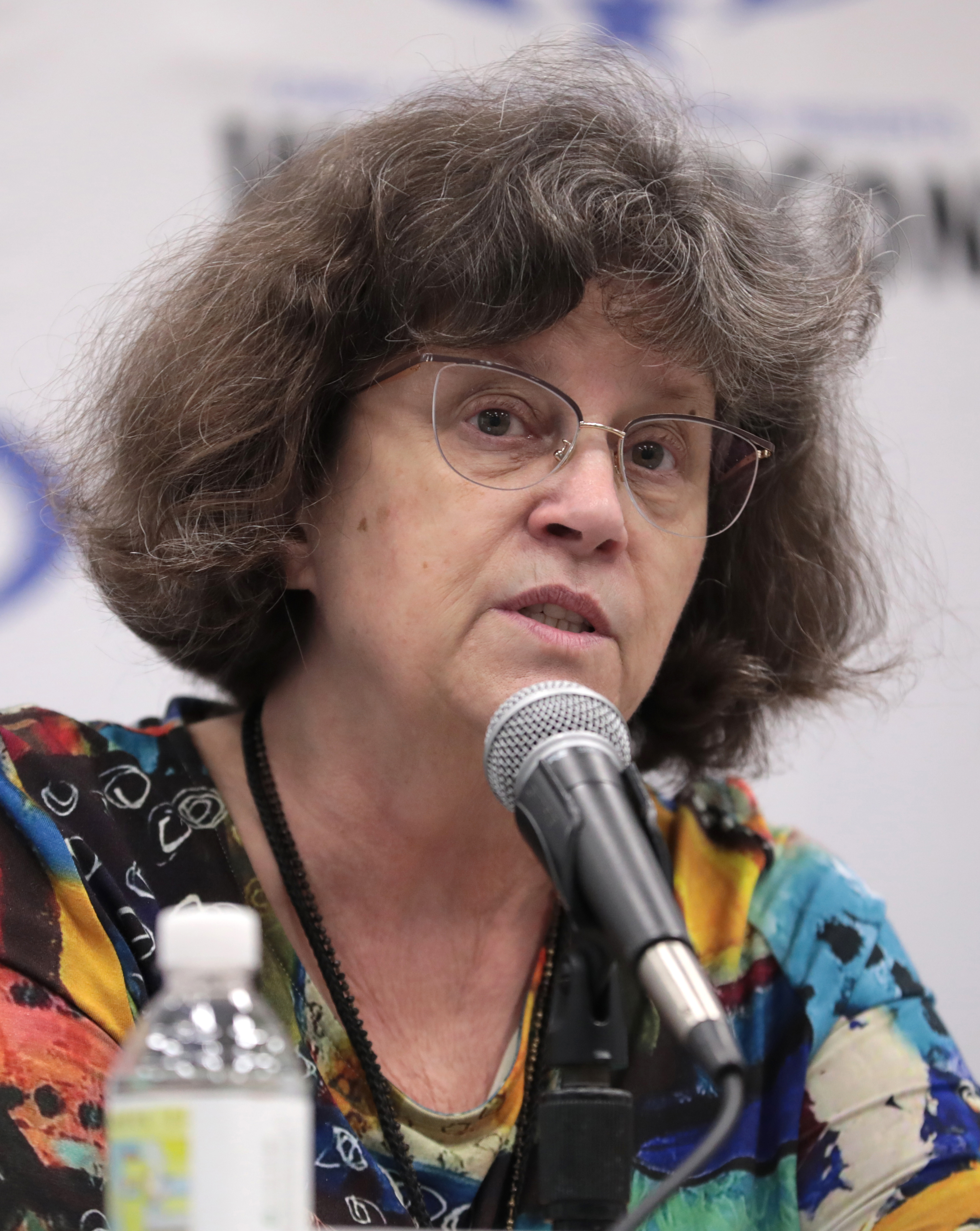
- Kesel at the 2023 WonderCon
- Born: Barbara Randall; October 2, 1960 (age 66)
- Areas: Writer, Editor
- Notable works: The First; Hawk and Dove; Meridian; Sigil; Spelljammer
- Awards: Harvey Award 1996

Barbara Randall Kesel (/ˈkiːsəl/; née Randall, born October 2, 1960) is an American writer and editor of comic books. Her bibliography includes work for Crossgen, Dark Horse Comics, DC Comics, IDW Publishing, Image Comics, and Marvel Comics.

== Biography ==
Kesel initially entered the comics industry as college student after writing a 10-page letter to editor Dick Giordano regarding the portrayal of female comic book characters, when Giordano then offered her a writing job. Her first published comics story (credited as "Barbara J. Randall") was "He with Secrets Fears the Sound...", a Batgirl backup feature, in Detective Comics #518 (Sept. 1982). After receiving her college degree in drama studies in 1983, she became an associate editor at DC Comics in 1984, and was promoted to editor the following year. In 1988, she wrote a Batgirl Special and then co-wrote, with then-husband Karl Kesel, a Hawk and Dove miniseries, followed by an ongoing series that ran from 1989 until 1991. As a solo writer, Kesel scripted the licensed Dungeons & Dragons series Spelljammer in 1990–1991 and an adaptation of the D&D novel trilogy Avatar in 1991.

Kesel became an editor at Dark Horse Comics in 1991 and later was part of Team CGW, responsible for most of the design and creation of the setting and characters in the Golden City location. In the second half of the 1990s, she also wrote for Image Comics, scripting all seven issues of Savant Garde, the miniseries Shattered Image with fellow writer Kurt Busiek, and issues of Stormwatch and WildC.A.T.s. For Marvel Comics, Kesel wrote the limited series Ultragirl (1996–1997) and (with Karl Kesel) the Captain America/Citizen V Annual '98. Kesel also returned to DC and wrote the Alpha Centurion Special (1996), several Superboy issues (1997), and the "Girlfrenzy!"-oneshot Superman: Lois Lane as well as the Elseworld's Finest: Supergirl & Batgirl one-shot in 1998.

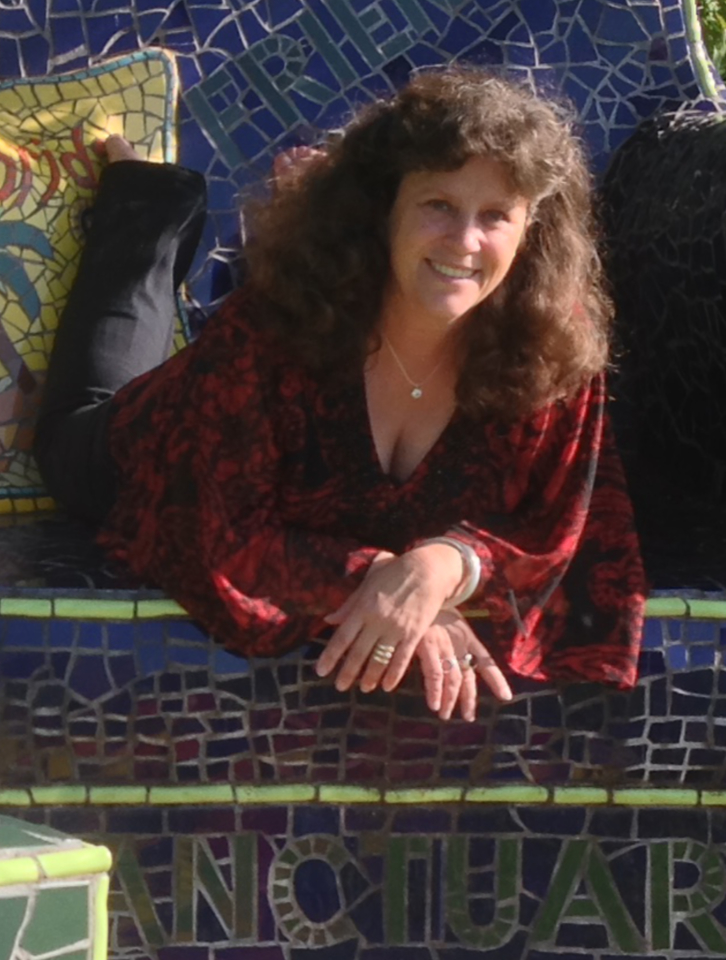
Barbara Kesel at the Coral Springs Museum of Art, Coral Springs, FL in 2015.

From 2000 to 2004, Kesel worked as both a writer and an editor at CrossGen, where she scripted the series Meridian, The First, Sigil and Solus as well as issues of CrossGen Chronicles. In 2007, Tokyopop released the first volume of Legends of the Dark Crystal, an OEL manga based on Jim Henson's film The Dark Crystal, written by Kesel. Volume 2 was published in 2010.

As of 2008, she was part of the packaging company "The Pack" with Lee Nordling, Brian Augustyn, Gordon Kent, and Dave Olbrich. The same year, Kesel began to work for IDW Publishing, writing a four-part Ghostwhisperer comic miniseries, another miniseries based on the adventure novel series Rogue Angel and the comic adaptation of the animated film Igor. In 2015, she wrote a Wonder Woman story for DC's digital series Sensation Comics, later published in print as Sensation Comics #13. When fellow comic book writer Kurt Busiek put together creative teams for the eight standalone, oversized issues of his Marvels Snapshots series, he hired Kesel to write the first issue starring the 1980s Avengers, which was published in 2021.

As of 2022, Kesel started working for a tech-startup called Urus Entertainment.

Kesel is an outspoken opponent of sexism in the comic book industry. She is known for her strong female characters and created Grace, the ruler of the Golden City location in Comics' Greatest World.

== Personal life ==
She was married to comic book writer and inker Karl Kesel; they have since divorced.

== Awards ==
Kesel was nominated for the 1991 "Best Editor" Eisner Award for Badlands, Aliens: Genocide and Star Wars. In 1995, she was nominated for "Best Anthology" and "Best Graphic Album of Previously Published Material" Harvey Awards for, respectively, Instant Piano and Hellboy: Seed of Destruction. She won the 1996 "Best Graphic Album of Previously Published Work" Harvey Award, for Hellboy: The Wolves of St. August. She received a Comic-Con International Inkpot Award on July 22, 2022, for "Achievement in Comic Arts".

== Bibliography ==
=== Archaia ===
- The Dark Crystal: Creation Myths OGN (among others) (2011)

=== ComicMix ===
- Mine! OGN (among others) (2018)

=== CrossGen ===
- CrossGen Chronicles #1, 3, 6 (2000–2002)
- CrossGenesis #1 (2000)
- The First #1–37 (2000–2003)
- Meridian 1–44 (2000–2004)
- Sigil #1–11, 20 (2000–2002)
- Solus 1–8 (2003)

=== Dark Horse Comics ===
- Aliens vs. Predator: Booty #1 (1996)
- Comics' Greatest World: Catalyst: Agents of Change (#8) (1993)
- Comics' Greatest World: Mecha (#6) (1993)
- Comics' Greatest World: Rebel (#5) (1993)
- Comics' Greatest World: Titan (#7) (1993)
- Dark Horse Presents vol. 3 #18–20 (2016)
- Hard Looks #1 (with Andrew Vachss) (1992)
- Real Adventures of Jonny Quest #9–10 (1997)
- San Diego Comic Con Comics #1 (promo) (1992)
- Will to Power #7–9 (1994)

=== DC Comics ===
- Action Comics #574 (1985)
- Adventures of Superman #557 (1998)
- Alpha Centurion Special #1 (1996)
- Avatar #1–3 (1991)
- Batgirl Special #1 (1988)
- Batgirl: The Bronze Age Omnibus #2 (foreword) (2019)
- Batman #401 (1986)
- DC Comics Presents #94 (1986)
- Detective Comics #518–519 (Batgirl backup stories) (1982)
- Elseworld's Finest: Supergirl & Batgirl #1 (1998)
- Elvira's House of Mystery Special #1 (1987)
- The Fury of Firestorm #57 (1987)
- Hawk and Dove vol. 2 #1–5 (1988)
- Hawk and Dove vol. 3 #1–28, Annual #1–2 (1989–1991)
- Hawkman vol. 2 #10 (1987)
- Heroes Against Hunger #1 (1986)
- Invasion! Special: Daily Planet #1 (1989)
- New Talent Showcase #15 (1985)
- The New Titans #68–69 (1990)
- Secret Origins vol. 2 #20 (Batgirl); #43 (Hawk and Dove) (1987–1989)
- Sensation Comics Featuring Wonder Woman #13 (2015)
- Spelljammer #1–8, 11 (1990–1991)
- Superboy vol. 3 #43–44, 48–49, Annual #2 (1995–1998)
- Supergirl Annual #1 (1996)
- Superman: Lois Lane #1 (1998)
- Team Superman Secret Files #1 (1998)
- Teen Titans Spotlight #19 (1988)
- TSR Worlds #1 (1990)
- Who's Who in the DC Universe #1–2, 4, 6–7 (1990–1991)
- Who's Who in the Legion of Super-Heroes #1–6 (1988)

==== Amalgam Comics ====
- Exciting X-Patrol #1 (1997)
- X-Patrol #1 (1996)

=== Flux ===
- Black is for Beginnings OGN (with Laurie Faria Stolarz) (2009)

=== IDW Publishing ===
- Ghost Whisperer: The Muse #1–4 (2008–2009)
- Igor: Movie Adaptation #1–4 (2008)
- My Little Pony: Friends Forever #12, 25 (2014, 2016)
- My Little Pony Micro-Series #4 (2013)
- Rogue Angel: Teller of Tall Tales #1–5 (2008)
- Teenage Mutant Ninja Turtles Micro-Series #7 (2012)
- Womanthology: Heroic OGN (among others) (2011)
- Womanthology: Space #5 (2013)

=== Image Comics ===
- Gen^{13} Bootleg #19 (1998)
- Savant Garde #1–7 (1997)
- Savant Garde Fan Edition #1–3 (1997)
- Shattered Image #1–4 (with Kurt Busiek) (1996)
- Stormwatch #29–30 (1995)
- WildC.A.T.s #35–36 (1997)

=== Lion Forge Comics ===
- Airwolf: Airstrikes #4 (2015)

=== Marvel Comics ===
- Captain America/Citizen V '98 #1 (1998)
- Marvels Snapshots: Avengers #1 (2021)
- Ultragirl #1–3 (1996–1997)

=== Silver Dragon Books ===
- Animal Planet: The World's Most Dangerous Animals (among others) (2012)

=== Tokyopop ===
- Aqua volume 1–2 (English adaptation) (2007–2008)
- Arcana volume 1–5 (English adaptation) (2005–2007)
- Legends of the Dark Crystal volume 1–2 (2007–2010)

== Characters created ==
- Bloody Mary
- Catalyst: Agents of Change
- Enson
- Grace
- Ilahn of Cadador
- Lindy Karsten
- Malice Vundabar
- Sephie of Meridian
- Solusandra
- Speed Queen
- Titan
- Ultra Girl
- Wyture

Preceded by Len Wein	Watchmen editor 1987	Succeeded by n/a
Preceded by Marv Wolfman	The New Teen Titans vol. 2 / The New Titans editor 1987–1989	Succeeded by Mike Carlin
Preceded by Mike Gold	The Flash vol. 2 editor 1988–1989	Succeeded by Brian Augustyn
