= X (Dark Horse Comics) =

Comic book character

- Cover of X #1; Art by Rick Leonardi and James Palmiotti

Publication information
- First appearance: Dark Horse Comics #8 (Mar. 1993)
- Created by: Mike Richardson; Chris Warner

In-story information
- Notable aliases: John Doe, John Smith, The X-Killer, Lord Alamout, Ghost
- Abilities: Expert swordsman and marksman Skilled hand-to-hand combatant Regenerative healing factor

X is a comic book character who starred in his own self-titled series published by Dark Horse Comics for their Comics Greatest World imprint. He is a dark anti-hero vigilante with little true feeling and a strong tendency to kill.

After the character debuted in Dark Horse Comics #8, his own self-titled series began with a cover date of February, 1994, ending with issue #25 in April 1996.

Dark Horse re-launched the title with issue #0 in April 2013, and a new creative team of Duane Swierczynski and Eric Nguyen.

== Publication ==
Series Creative Staff Information

Below is a list of those who worked on the book. When repeated, only last names are used.

- 1-5: Steven Grant, writer | Doug Mahnke, pencils | Jimmy Palmiotti, inks.
- 6: Grant, writer | Ron Wagner and P. Craig Russell, pencils | Palmiotti, inks.
- 7: Grant, writer | Wagner & Frank Fosco, pencils | Palmiotti, inks.
- 8: Grant, writer | Matt Haley, pencils | Tom Simmons, inks.
- 9: Grant, writer | Mahnke, pencils | Palmiotti, inks.
- 10-12: Grant, writer | Chris Warner, pencils | Tim Bradstreet, inks.
- 13-15: Grant, writer | Javier Saltares, art.
- 16-17: Grant, writer | Saltares, pencils | Andrew Pepoy, inks.
- 18: Grant, writer | Alex Renaud, pencils | Pepoy, inks.
- 19-22: Grant, writer | Saltares, pencils | Pepoy, inks.
- 23: Grant, writer | Saltares, pencils | Bradstreet, inks.
- 24-25: Grant, writer | Saltares, pencils | Pepoy, inks.

2013 Re-launch

- 0-24: Duane Swierczynski, writer | Eric Nguyen, pencils.

== Plot ==
X, whose law is that one mark means a warning, the second one death, takes on a collection of business, law, mob, assassins and politics. This includes characters such as Mayor Teal and Police Commissioner Anderson as well as the Llewellyn brothers, their hired assassin named Gamble, Mob boss Carmine Tango and highly connected army officials.

- 1-15: The first section of the series involves a series of political hits performed by X, sometimes in tandem with a woman named Diana Gorreti, who wanted to take over Arcadia from mobster Carmine Tango. It is eventually revealed that X used Goretti to remove Tango and put pliable people in positions of power within the city. To this end, a "War" was fought between X and the mob, during which X was briefly thought killed by a mysterious mind controlling villain named Lord Alamout.
- 16-20: X travels to Washington D.C. to let the government know that he is in control of Arcadia and to try to extend his influence. During the trip to D.C., X encounters a general who seems to know something about X's early past. It is also revealed that X arrived in Arcadia as a young man, rapidly recovering from burns that covered much of his body and with no clear memories. He fell in love with his case worker who was involved with another man, Carmine Tango. X tried to kill Tango which amused him, so he took X in and pushed the case worker out of both of their lives.
- 21-25: Gamble, the only man X failed to kill after marking, returned and drew X into the open by inviting a rash of killers into Arcadia. Assistant D.A. Elizabeth Treaty spends some time building a case against X. Coffin returns just as X busts up Gamble's operations, saves Christie and marks McCone, one of the killers. The General explains that as a young military officer, he was sent in to search the area of a bombed scientist's lab and his arm was infected. The arm was amputated, but would not die and was eventually stolen. X finally recalls how he lost faith in everything he grew up believing, the day his father and mother were killed in front of him by men from the government. His father, before dying, injected him with a serum from an arm in a tank. As X recovers from a wound, the General realizes that the key to X's invulnerability is that his blood analyzes and repairs itself. Coffin arrives and rips the general in two, before being defeated by X, who also kills Gamble. At the end of the series, Treaty grants X full immunity.

== Other appearances ==
- Will to Power #1-3, Script by Jerry Prosser, art by Mike Manley (& Ande Parkes, #3)
- Dark Horse Comics #19 & 20: "Welcome to the Jungle", Written by Eric Luke, art by Nghia Lam
- X (Hero Illustrated Special) # 1 & 2: Written by Steven Grant, art by Vince Giarrano, # 1, Corky Lehmkuhl & Jordi Ensign, # 2. (Introduces Challenge)
- Ghost Special: Written by Eric Luke, pencils by Matt Haley, inks by Tom Simmons
- X: "One Shot to the Head". (originally in Dark Horse Comics # 8-10) Script by Jerry Prosser, pencils by N. Steven Harris, Inks by Dan Davis. Also, this issue collects the first five pages of "X" from Arcadia week one, which had pencils by Chris Warner and Inks by Tim Bradstreet. Cover is by Frank Miller.
- Comics Greatest World: Arcadia, weeks 1-4: X (pencils by Chris Warner, inks by Tim Bradstreet), Pit Bulls (pencils by Joe Phillips, inks by John Dell), Ghost (pencils by Adam Hughes, inks by Mark Farmer), Monster (pencils by Derek Thompson, inks by Ande Parks). All were written by Jerry Prosser.
- Ghost : Issue #9, #15, #'s 20-27, #32. Written by Eric Luke.

== Characters ==
While it is debatable if X ever truly aligns with anyone else, he does team up with or use another person in order to benefit from them. Essentially, X either kills you or he does not, mostly disregarding any prior use.

=== Allies ===
- Mickey D (First appears in # 1)
- Kingston (First appears in # 1)
- Monster (First appears in CGW: Arcadia)

=== Villains ===
- Carmine Tango (First appears in #1)
- Ziggurat/Coffin (First appears in #2)
- Lord Alamout (First appears in #6)
- Willie McCone (First appears in #21)
- Gamble (First appears in #1)
- Chaos Riders (First appear in #3)
- Judgement Knights (First appear in #9)
- Headhunter (First appears in #16)
- One-Shot (First appears in #16)
- The General (First appears in #20)

=== Others ===
These people may be antagonistic or beneficial (sometimes both) to X. Because of this and other characteristics, they do not qualify as a villain or ally:

- Christie (First appears in #1)
- The Kid (First appears in #5)
- Mose Hughes (First appears in #10)
- Kossy (First appears in #10)
- Elizabeth Treaty (First appears in #21)
- Vargas (First appears in #8)
- Congressman DeMarco (First Appears in CGW: Arcadia)
- Mayor Teal (First Appears in CGW: Arcadia)
- Commissioner Anderson (First appears in CGW: Arcadia)
- Diana Goretti (First appears in #5)
- Gretchen (First appears in #1)
- Challenge (Real name-Tommy Kafka. First appears in Hero Illustrated X Special #1)
- Briggs
- Detective Lewis
- Detective Timothy
- Peter Lwellyn (First appears in #1)
- The Nurse (First appears in #5)
- Ghost (First appears in CGW: Arcadia)
- The Mask (First appears in: The Mask World tour #3)

== Adaptations ==
A series of full-cast dramatised audiobooks has been adapted from the comics by GraphicAudio, with the first one released on 22 October 2022.
