= List of Dark Horse Comics imprint publications =

Dark Horse Comics is an American comic book company. These are the ongoing and limited series publications it has released under its imprints.

== Comics' Greatest World/Dark Horse Heroes ==
Title	Vol. #	Issues	Dates	Notes
Agents of Law		#1-6	Mar – Aug 1995	
Catalyst: Agents of Change		#1-7	Feb – Sep 1994	
Comics' Greatest World		#1-16	Jun – Sep 1993	Published weekly
Division 13		#1-4	Sep 1994 – Jan 1995	
Ghost	1	#1-36	Apr 1995 – Apr 1998	
Ghost	2	#1-22	Sep 1998 – Aug 2000	
Ghost Special		#1-3	1994 – 1998	
Hero Zero		#1	Sep 1994	
King Tiger / Motorhead		#1-2	Aug – Sep 1996	
The Machine		#1-4	Nov 1994 – Feb 1995	
The Mask Strikes Back		#1-5	Feb – Jun 1995	
The Mask: The Hunt For Green October		#1-4	Jul – Oct 1995	
The Mask: World Tour		#1-4	Dec 1995 – Mar 1996	
Mecha Special		#1	May 1995	
Motorhead		#1-6	Aug 1995 – Jan 1996	
Motorhead Special		#1	Mar 1994	
Out of the Vortex		#1-12	Oct 1993 – Oct 1994	
Revelations		#1	Mar 1995	
Titan Special		#1	Jun 1994	
Will to Power		#1-12	Jun – Aug 1994	Published weekly
X		#1-25	Feb 1994 – Apr 1996	
X: Hero Special		#1-2	Jun 1994	
X: One Shot to the Head		#1	Aug 1994	

== Legend ==
Title	Vol. #	Issues	Dates	Notes
Babe	1	#1-4	Jul – Oct 1994	
Babe	2	#1-2	Mar – Apr 1995	
Big Guy and Rusty the Boy Robot		#1-2	Jul – Aug 1995	
Concrete: Killer Smile		#1-4	Jul – Oct 1994	
Concrete: Strange Armour		#1-5	Dec 1997 – May 1998	
Concrete: Think Like a Mountain		#1-6	Mar – Aug 1996	
Danger Unlimited		#1-4	Feb – May 1994	
Happy Birthday, Martha Washington		#1	Mar 1995	
Hellboy: The Corpse and the Iron Shoes		#1	Jan 1996	
Hellboy: Seed of Destruction		#1-4	Mar – Jun 1994	
Hellboy: Wake the Devil		#1-5	Jun – Oct 1996	
Hellboy: The Wolves of Saint August		#1	Nov 1995	
John Byrne's 2112		#1	Nov 1991	
Madman		#2-11	Apr 1994 – Oct 1996	
Martha Washington Goes to War		#1-5	May – Nov 1994	
Martha Washington Stranded in Space		#1	Nov 1995	
Monkeyman and O'Brien		#1-3	Jul – Sep 1996	
Next Men		#19-30	Oct 1993 – Dec 1994	
Sin City: The Big Fat Kill		#1-5	Nov 1994 – Mar 1995	
Star Slammers Special			Jun 1996	

== Maverick ==
Title	Vol. #	Issues	Dates	Notes
The Amazing Screw-On Head		#1	May 2002	
The Art of Sin City			Nov 2002	
American Splendor: Bedtime Stories			Jun 2000	
American Splendor: Portrait of the Author in His Declining Years			Apr 2001	
American Splendor: Terminal			Sep 1999	
American Splendor: Unsung Hero		#1-3	Aug – Oct 2002	
Ancient Joe		#1-3	Oct – Dec 2001	
Billi 99	TPB	#1-4	Oct 2002	
The Complete Pip and Norton		#1	Summer 2002	
Dark Horse Maverick 2000			Jul 2000	
Dark Horse Maverick 2001			Jul 2001	
Dark Horse Maverick: Happy Endings			Sep 2002	
Feeders			Oct 1999	
Grendel: Devil's Legacy		#1-12	Mar 2000 – Feb 2001	
Grendel: Red, White, and Black		#1-4	Dec 2002	
Grendel: The Devil Inside		#1-3	Sep – Nov 2001	
Harlequin Valentine			Nov 2001	
Hellboy: Box Full of Evil		#1-2	Aug – Sep 1999	
Hellboy: Conqueror Worm		#1-4	May – Aug 2001	
Hellboy: The Third Wish		#1-2	Jul – Aug 2002	
Hieroglyph		#1-4	Nov 1999 – Feb 2000	
Last Day in Vietnam		#1	Jul 2000	
Madman Comics		#16-20	Dec 1999 – Dec 2000	
The Ring of the Nibelung	1	#1-4	Feb – May 2000	
The Ring of the Nibelung	2	#1-3	Aug – Oct 2000	
The Ring of the Nibelung	3	#1-3	Dec 2000 – Feb 2001	
The Ring of the Nibelung	4	#1-4	Jun – Sep 2001	
Sergio Aragonés Actions Speak		#1-6	Jan – Jun 2001	
Sergio Aragonés' Groo: Death & Taxes		#1-4	Dec 2001 – Apr 2002	
Sergio Aragonés' Groo: Mightier Than the Sword		#1-4	Jan – Apr 2000	
Sin City: Hell and Back		#1-9	Jul 1999 – Apr 2000	
Sock Monkey	2	#1-2	Jul – Aug 1999	
Sock Monkey	3	#1-2	Nov – Dec 2000	
Space Circus		#1-4	Jul – Oct 2000	
Too Much Coffee Man's Parade of Tirade			Nov 1999	
Usagi Yojimbo		#30-62	Jul 1999 – Nov 2002	
The World Below: Deeper and Stranger		#1-4	Dec 1999 – Mar 2000	

== Project Black Sky ==
Title	Vol. #	Issues	Dates	Notes
2 Past Midnight			Jun 2014	TPB
Barb Wire		#1-8	Jul 2015 – Feb 2016	
Blackout		#1-4	Mar – Jun 2014	Features King Tiger
Brain Boy		#1-3	Sep – Nov 2013	
Brain Boy		#0	Dec 2013	
Brain Boy: The Men From G. E. S. T. A. L. T.		#1-4	May – Aug 2014	
Captain Midnight		#0	Jun 2013	
Captain Midnight		#1-24	Jul 2013 – Jun 2015	
Catalyst Comix		#1-9	Jul 2013 – Mar 2014	
Ghost		#0	Sep 2012	
Ghost	1	#1-4	Oct 2012 – Mar 2013	
Ghost	2	#1-12	Dec 2013 – Feb 2015	
King Tiger		#1-4	Aug – Nov 2015	
The Occultist			Dec 2010	One-shot
The Occultist	1	#1-3	Nov 2011 – Jan 2012	
The Occultist	2	#1-5	Oct 2013 – Feb 2014	
Project Black Sky: Secret Files			Oct 2014	TPB
Skyman		#1-4	Jan – Apr 2014	
Skyman			Nov 2014	One-shot
X		#0	Apr 2013	
X		#1-24	May 2013 – Apr 2015	

== Rocket Comics ==
Title	Vol. #	Issues	Dates	Notes
Crush		#1-4	Oct 2003 – Jan 2004	
Fierce		#1-4	Jul – Oct 2004	Gettosake Entertainment
Fused		#1-4	Dec 2003 – Mar 2004	Steve Niles
Galactic		#1-3	Aug – Oct 2003	
Go Boy 7: Human Action Machine		#1-5	Jul 2003 – Mar 2004	Unpublished issues #6-8 collected in the second TPB
Hell		#1-4	Jul 2003 – Mar 2004	
Lone		#1-6	Sep 2003 – Apr 2004	
The Moth		#1-4	Apr – Jul 2004	Steve Rude & Gary Martin
The Moth Special			Mar 2004	Steve Rude & Gary Martin
Rocket Comics: Ignite			Apr 2003	Free Comic Book Day
Spyboy: Final Exam		#1-4	May – Aug 2004	
Syn		#1-5	Aug 2003 – Feb 2004	
El Zombo Fantasma		#1-3	Apr – Jul 2004	Kevin Munroe and Dave Wilkins
