= Barb Wire (1996 film) =

1996 film by David Hogan

- Theatrical release poster
- Directed by: David Hogan
- Screenplay by: Chuck Pfarrer; Ilene Chaiken
- Story by: Ilene Chaiken
- Based on: Barb Wire by Chris Warner
- Produced by: Todd Moyer; Mike Richardson; Brad Wyman
- Starring: Pamela Anderson Lee; Temuera Morrison; Victoria Rowell; Jack Noseworthy; Xander Berkeley; Udo Kier; Steve Railsback
- Cinematography: Rick Bota
- Edited by: Peter Schink
- Music by: Michel Colombier
- Production companies: PolyGram Filmed Entertainment; Propaganda Films; Dark Horse Entertainment
- Distributed by: Gramercy Pictures
- Release date: May 3, 1996
- Running time: 98 minutes
- Country: United States
- Language: English
- Budget: $9 million
- Box office: $3.8 million

Barb Wire is a 1996 American dystopian action film directed by David Hogan, produced by Brad Wyman, and written by Chuck Pfarrer and Ilene Chaiken, based on the Dark Horse Comics character of the same name. The film stars Pamela Anderson in the title role, alongside Temuera Morrison, Victoria Rowell, Xander Berkeley, Udo Kier, and Steve Railsback.

Barb Wire was released in the United States on May 3, 1996, by Gramercy Pictures. The film was panned upon release, and received six nominations at the 17th Golden Raspberry Awards, including Worst Picture and Worst Actress for Anderson.

== Plot ==
In 2017, during the Second American Civil War, Barb Wire owns the Hammerhead, a nightclub in Steel Harbor, "the last free city" in a United States ravaged by the war. She earns cash as a mercenary and bounty hunter. Chief of Police Willis raids her club. Willis's target is fugitive Dr. Corrina 'Cora D' Devonshire, a former government scientist with information about a new bioweapon called Red Ribbon being developed by her former superiors in the Congressional Directorate. The Congressional Council has tasked Colonel Victor Pryzer with finding Dr. Devonshire so they can end the Second Civil War by releasing the virus on the United Front territories. Dr. Devonshire hopes to escape to Canada to make this information public.

Devonshire turns up at the Hammerhead. She is accompanied by Axel Hood, a "freedom fighter" Barb had loved at the outbreak of the war. The two were separated during the conflict. Axel tries to help Cora get to Canada. They try to find a contraband pair of contact lenses that would allow Cora to evade the retinal scan identification at the Steel Harbor airport. The lenses pass through the hands of several lowlifes before also ending up at Barb's nightclub.

Rather than give the lenses to Cora and Axel, Barb makes a deal with 'Big Fatso', the leader of a junkyard gang: Fatso wants the lenses, which are worth a fortune on the black market, and Barb wants a million dollars and an armed escort to the airport, where she plans to get on the plane to Canada. But Fatso double-crosses Barb; when Barb, Axel and Cora show up at the junkyard to make the swap, Colonel Pryzer and his storm troopers are also there, along with Chief of Police Willis. Willis makes a show of arresting Barb and Cora, but instead of putting handcuffs on Barb, he slips her a hand grenade. Barb uses the grenade to kill Fatso and cause enough confusion to allow Barb, Axel, Cora and Willis to pile into Barb's armored van and lead the Congressionals on a car chase, culminating in a hand-to-hand fight between Barb and Colonel Pryzer on a forklift suspended by crane above the harbor. Pryzer falls to his death while Barb escapes.

The party makes it to the airport, where Barb reveals she still has the contact lenses. She gives them to Cora, and Cora and Axel get on the plane to Canada while Willis and Barb remain on the rainswept tarmac.

== Cast ==
- Pamela Anderson Lee as Barbara "Barb Wire" Kopetski
- Temuera Morrison as Axel Hood
- Victoria Rowell as Dr. Corrina "Cora D" Devonshire
- Jack Noseworthy as Charlie Kopetski
- Xander Berkeley as Chief Alexander Willis
- Udo Kier as "Curly"
- Andre Rosey Brown as "Big Fatso"
- Nicholas Worth as Ruben Tannenbaum
- Clint Howard as Schmitz
- Jennifer Banko as "Spike"
- Steve Railsback as Colonel Victor Pryzer

== Production ==
Barb Wire was directed by David Hogan, the second-unit director on Alien 3 and Batman Forever. principal photography took place between April 28, 1995, and August 3, 1995. The film had a production budget of $9 million. Anderson's manager tried to advise her not to do the film, stating that she should not play "a cartoon character", but she felt that nobody could play the role than her; she accepted it without reading the script. Anderson did some of her own stunts, despite her fear of heights. The fact that she had to wear high heels and a corset that made her waist 17 inches made fight scenes challenging.

== Music ==
A soundtrack album, also titled Barb Wire, was released on April 23, 1996.

== Release ==
=== Box office ===
Barb Wire grossed $3.8 million in the United States.

== Reception ==
On the review aggregator website Rotten Tomatoes, 28% of 36 critics' reviews are positive, with an average rating of 4.2/10. The website's consensus reads: "Barb Wire could've been fun camp, but Pamela Anderson can't deliver her lines with any dramatic or comedic impact."

Roger Ebert pointed out that the plot was identical to that of Casablanca, and derided the low-brow attempts at sensuality, but praised the cast and crew's approach to the material: "The filmmakers must have known they were not making a good movie, but they didn't use that as an excuse to be boring and lazy. Barb Wire has a high energy level, and a sense of deranged fun". He gave it two and a half stars. Similarly to Ebert, Owen Gleiberman of Entertainment Weekly gave a "C" rating, commenting on the film's aping of the Casablanca plot and its "teasing, hollow 'naughtiness'", but further said that the film is lacking in energy.

Janet Maslin of The New York Times criticized Anderson's performance, comparing her to Barbie and Barbarella. Barb Wire ranked in the bottom 20 of the Stinkers' "100 Years, 100 Stinkers" list, which noted the 100 worst films of the 20th century, at #19. Since its release, Barb Wire has attracted a cult following.

=== Awards and nominations ===
Year	Group	Award	Recipient(s)	Result
1996	Golden Raspberry Awards	Worst Picture	Todd Moyer, Mike Richardson and Brad Wyman	Nominated
1996	Golden Raspberry Awards	Worst Actress	Pamela Anderson	Nominated
1996	Golden Raspberry Awards	Worst Screen Couple	Pamela Anderson's "Impressive Enhancements"	Nominated
1996	Golden Raspberry Awards	Worst Screenplay	Chuck Pfarrer and Ilene Chaiken	Nominated
1996	Golden Raspberry Awards	Worst New Star	Pamela Anderson	Won
1996	Golden Raspberry Awards	Worst "Original" Song	"Welcome to Planet Boom!", by Tommy Lee	Nominated
1996	Stinkers Bad Movie Awards	Worst Actress	Pamela Lee [Anderson]	Nominated
1997	MTV Movie Awards	Best Fight	Pamela Anderson and Steve Railsback	Nominated

== Adaptations ==
GT Interactive announced that they would be publishing a video game based on the film for the PlayStation, Saturn, PC, and Macintosh in January 1997. The developer was Cryo Interactive. The gameplay was said to be similar to Resident Evil, with a single-player campaign and a two-player deathmatch mode. It was never released.

A 48-page comic book adaptation was published by Dark Horse Comics on May 1, 1996.
