= Jerry Prosser =

American comic book writer and editor

- Areas: Writer, editor

Jerry Prosser is an American comic book writer and editor, best known for his work with Dark Horse Comics.

Prosser was part of Dark Horse Comics from its early days, and was one of five creators, who as Team CGW created the Comics' Greatest World line for Dark Horse Comics. Since then, he has written for many Dark Horse titles, and moved into editorial duties, most notably on Frank Miller's Sin City: A Dame to Kill For, and various licensed Aliens and Predator comics.

He also penciled part of Godzilla No. 5, one of Dark Horse's earliest licensed properties, in December 1988.

In addition to his work with Dark Horse, Prosser wrote the final ten issues (#80–89) of the Grant Morrison-launched DC/Vertigo series Animal Man in 1995, and has written comics set in the world of Magic: the Gathering for Armada/Acclaim Comics.

== Bibliography ==
=== Writer ===
- The Mark #4–6 (Sep 1988 – Jan 1989)
- Spacehawk No. 1 (Nov 1989)
- Mayhem #1–4 (Dark Horse, May–Sep 1989)
- Exquisite Corpse No. 1 (Dark Horse, Jan 1990)
- True North II (1991) Benefit comic for the Canadian Comic Legends Legal Defense Fund
- "Fifth Anniversary Special" in Dark Horse Presents: Fifth Anniversary Special (Apr 1991)
- Aliens: Hive #1–4 (Dark Horse, Feb–May 1992)
- "From the Cradle to the Grave" in Primal (1992)
- Cyberantics HC (1992) (both pseudonymous writer "Stanislaw Mayakovski" as well as editor)
- "Night of the Living Deadline" in Deadline No. 1 (Apr 1992)
- "Hunka Hunka Burnin' Deadline" in Deadline No. 2 (May 1992)
- "Off Deadline" in Deadline No. 3 (Jun 1992)
- "Prescription Strength Deadline" in Deadline No. 4 (Jul 1992)
- Aliens No. 1 (with Mark Verheiden (Jul 1992)
- Andrew Vachss' Hard Looks No. 3, 8–9 (Jul 1992, May–Jul 1993)
- "Workingman's Deadline" in Deadline No. 5 (Aug 1992)
- Dark Horse Comics #8–10 (Mar–May 1993)
- Special Limited Edition Arcadia Collection No. 1 (1993)
- Comics' Greatest World Arcadia #1–4 (Dark Horse, Jun 1993)
- Skin Graft: The Adventures of a Tattooed Man #1–4 (with art by Warren Pleece, Vertigo, Jul–Oct 1993)
- By Bizarre Hands (adapter) #2–3 (May–June 1994)
- Will to Power #1–3 (Dark Horse, Jun 1994)
- Predator: Invaders from the Fourth Dimension (Dark Horse, Jul/Aug 1994)
- X: One Shot to the Head No. 1 (Dark Horse, Aug 1994)
- Vertigo Rave (DC/Vertigo, Nov 1994)
- "Ghost Stories" in Ghost TPB (Apr 1995)
- Bram Stoker's Burial of the Rats No. 1 (Roger Corman's Cosmic Comics, Apr 1995)
- Animal Man #80–89 (DC/Vertigo, Feb–Nov 1995)
- Wizard: The Comics Magazine No. 49 (Wizard, Sep 1995)
- Magic: The Gathering: Antiquities War #1–4 (Armada, Nov 1995 – Feb 1996)
- Eternal Warrior Fist and Steel #1–2 (Valiant, May–Jun 1996)
- Predator: Jungle Tales No. 1 (May 1996)
- Magic: the Gathering: Dakkon Blackblade (Armada, Jun 1996)
- Urza-Mishra War on the World of Magic: The Gathering #1–2 (Armada, Sep–Oct 1996)
- Crow: Wild Justice #1–3 (Kitchen Sink Press/Top Dollar Comics, Oct–Dec 1996)
- Gen13 No. 36 (Image, Dec 1998)
- J. O'Barr's The Crow: A Cycle of Shattered Lives No. 0 (Kitchen Sink Press, Dec 1998)
- Aliens: Harvest TPB (1998)

=== Editor ===
- Deadline USA #1–2 (Sep–Nov 1991)
- Andrew Vachss' Hard Looks #1–10 (Mar 1992 – Sep 1993)
- Deadline #1–5 (Apr–Aug 1992)
- Freaks' Amour No. 1 (Jul 1992)
- James Bond: Serpent's Tooth #1–3 (Jul 1992 – Feb 1993)
- Dark Horse Comics #1–11 (Aug 1992 – Jul 1993)
- Primal #1–2 (Oct–Dec 1992)
- Ring of Roses #1–3 (Nov 1992 – Jan 1993)
- Thirteen O'Clock #1 (Dec 1992)
- Dark Horse Presents #69 (Feb 1993)
- Predator: Race War #0–4 (Feb–Oct 1993)
- James Bond: A Silent Armageddon #1–2 (Mar–May 1993
- Comics' Greatest World: Vortex #1–4 (Sep 1993)
- Dead in the West #1–2 (Oct 1993 – Mar 1994)
- Sin City: A Dame to Kill For #1–6 by Frank Miller (Nov 1993 – May 1994)
- Andrew Vachss' Underground #1–4 (Dark Horse, Nov 1993 – May 1994)
- Aliens: Music of the Spears #1–4 (Jan–Apr 1994)
- Martha Washington Goes To War #1–2 by Frank Miller & Dave Gibbons (May–Jun 1994)
- White Like She #1–2 (May–Jun 1994)
