= Ghost/Hellboy =

Comic book miniseries

- Special cover by Mike Mignola

Publication information
- Publisher: Dark Horse Comics
- Format: Miniseries
- Genre: Action/adventureHorror
- Publication date: May–June 1996
- No. of issues: 2
- Main characters: Ghost; Hellboy

Creative team
- Created by: Team CGW; Mike Mignola
- Written by: Mike Mignola
- Penciller: Scott Benefiel
- Inker: Jason Rodriguez
- Letterer: Sean Konot
- Colorist: Pamela Rambo
- Editor: Scott Allie

Collected editions
- Ghost/Hellboy Special: ISBN 978-1-56971-273-3

Ghost/Hellboy is a Dark Horse Comics two-issue crossover comic book miniseries written by Mike Mignola with art by Scott Benefiel published May to June 1996 featuring fictional heroes Ghost and Hellboy.

== Creation ==
Story writer Mignola created rough layouts or thumbnails, rather than a detailed script, in which as well as working out the action he also detailed the light and dark composition of the page for pencil artist Benefiel and inker Rodriguez to work from, which gave the work the Hellboy atmosphere.

== Publication history ==
Ghost #12 included three full-color preview pages from Ghost/Hellboy #1.

=== Comics ===
==== Issue #1 ====
The first issue (May 1, 1996) featured a cover by Mike Mignola and two black-and-white preview pages for Hellboy: Wake the Devil.

In the story Hellboy and B.P.R.D. psychic Josephine T. Gant travel to Arcadia to hunt down Ghost, but the tables are turned when Ghost receives a vision from someone calling himself Peace who tells her that Hellboy is her enemy and the key to releasing her from her suffering is the Right Hand of Doom.

==== Issue #2 ====
The second issue (June 1, 1996) featured a cover by Mike Mignola.

In the story Ghost delivers Hellboy to the being calling himself Peace on a mystical plane, but when he reveals himself to be Alal the Destroyer, who has been lying to her all along, the vengeful spirit and the world's greatest paranormal investigator must team up to avert the impending apocalypse.

=== Collected editions ===
The two issues were compiled and reprinted in the Ghost/Hellboy Special (June 25, 1997), which also included a two-page sketchbook of some of the thumbnail layouts and the preliminary character sketches Mignola provided for Benefiel to work from.
