= Barb Wire (character) =

Comic book character

- Cover to Barb Wire #1 (2015) by Adam Hughes

Publication information
- Publisher: Dark Horse Comics
- First appearance: Comics Greatest World: Steel Harbor - Week 1 (1993)
- Created by: Chris Warner; Team CGW

In-story information
- Alter ego: Barbara Kopetski
- Team affiliations: Machine, Wolf Gang
- Abilities: Knowledge of law enforcement and military tactics, expertise in many firearms, highly skilled hand-to-hand fighter, expert motorcyclist, expert driver

Barb Wire is a fictional character appearing in Comics Greatest World, an imprint of Dark Horse Comics. Created by Chris Warner and Team CGW, the character first appeared in Comics' Greatest World: Steel Harbor in 1993. The original Barb Wire series published nine issues between 1994 and 1995 and was followed by a four-issue miniseries in 1996. A reboot was published in 2015 and lasted eight issues. In 1996, the character was adapted into a film starring Pamela Anderson. Unlike the comics, the film takes place in a possible future rather than an alternate version of present-day Earth.

== Creators ==
Regular series

- 1: John Arcudi, writer/ Lee Moder, pencils/Ande Parks, inks
- 2–3: Arcudi, writer/ Dan Lawlis, pencils/Parks, inks
- 4–5: Arcudi, writer/Lawlis, pencils/Ian Akin, inks
- 6–7: Arcudi, writer/Mike Manley, pencils/Parks, inks
- 8: Arcudi, writer/ Andrew Robinson, pencils/ Jim Royal, inks
- 9: Anina Bennett & Paul Guinan, writers/ Robert Walker, pencils/Jim Royal, inks

Ace of Spades miniseries

1–4: Chris Warner, script and pencils/Tim Bradstreet, inks

== Fictional character biography ==
Barb Wire's stories take place on an alternate version of present-day Earth with superhumans and more advanced technology. In this Earth's history, an alien entity called the Vortex arrived in 1931 and began conducting secret experiments. In 1947, an atom bomb test detonated in a desert nearby the alien's experiments. The result was the creation of a trans-dimensional wormhole referred to as "the Vortex" or "the Maelstrom", which released energy that gave different people across Earth superpowers for years to come.

Decades later, Barbara Kopetski grows up in Steel Harbor when it is still a thriving steel industry city. Barbara and her brother Charlie live with their grandmother and parents, their mother being a police officer while their father is a former marine who became a steelworker. Officer Kopetski later dies, after which her husband becomes so ill he is confined to a bed for years, developing Alzheimer's disease as well before dying. Following the death of her father, Barbara leaves Steel Harbour for a time as the city's economy starts to spiral and crime begins rising. Soon, much of the city is controlled by warring gangs rather than local government. Years later, Barbara returns to Steel Harbor, now an experienced bounty hunter operating under the name Barb Wire. Reuniting with Charlie, she decides to stay in her hometown, becoming the owner of the Hammerhead bar. To help bring in money, she continues moonlighting as a bounty hunter, working with the police directly or bail bondsman Thomas Crashell.

As time goes on, Steel Harbor becomes more dangerous, described as "a city under siege from drugs, crime, pollution and gang warfare". In 1993, a second American Civil War begins when Golden City announces its secession from the Union. The announcement leads to protests and riots in several cities. The Steel Harbor Riots leave some neighborhoods in literal ruin, with hundreds of buildings destroyed or abandoned in the area known as "Metal City". Many are forced to leave the city or take to the streets, and the gangs (all of whom have superhuman members) start moving to take more control. To help contain the chaos and keep her home from descending further, Barb Wire now acts at times as a vigilante, intervening when the police can't or won't. Fighting alongside the Wolf Gang, she defies criminal Mace Blitzkrieg's attempts to bring all gangs under his leadership and control the city.

Growing up with a police officer mother and marine father, as well as her life experiences traveling outside of the city, Barb Wire is an excellent hand-to-hand combatant, skilled in various firearms, and an expert driver and motorcycle rider. Her bar has been considered neutral meeting ground by the Steel Harbor gangs. Aiding her bounty hunter activities is her brother Charlie, acting as her mechanic and engineer, and others such as Avram Roman Jr., a cyborg sometimes known simply as "the Machine". Though she has loyal allies, including Charlie, Barb Wire is a harsh, guarded person who looks at the world with suspicion and cynicism, considering herself a loner at heart.

=== Other characters ===
==== Supporting characters ====
- Charlie Kopetski, Barb's brother, a blind mechanic, and engineering genius. He invents and maintains most of her weapons and superhuman restraining devices. He openly complains about how often he must fix the equipment she continuously breaks during her adventures.

==== Allies ====
- The Machine, real name: Avram Roman Jr. A man whose body is inhabited by a self-repairing machine colony, making him an advanced cyborg. Along with a reinforced skeleton, superhuman strength and enhanced durability, he is capable of rebuilding parts of his body. Over time, he becomes more machine-like in nature, no longer requiring food.
- Motörhead, real name: Frank Fletcher. A drifter with psychic powers who is bonded to an ancient, powerful artifact known as the Motor.
- Wolf Gang, a group that believe gangs shouldn't go too far in their activities and victimize the city, and prefer independence and a balance of power rather than uniting all gangs under one leader. The Wolf Gang is formidable and its members are known for discipline and loyalty. The gang includes five superhumans: Burner (fire abilities); Bomber (creates energy bombs); Breaker (superhuman strength); Cutter (energy blades); and their leader Wolf Ferrell, also known as Hunter (enhanced senses).
- Ghost, real name: Elisa Cameron. A popular Dark Horse Comics character with ghost-like abilities who has a brief crossover story with Barb Wire.

==== Enemies ====
- The Prime Movers, a collective of street gang leaders who agree to serve under the leadership of superhumanly strong criminal Mace Blitzkrieg. The gang leaders include Airborne, Blackbelt, Deadlight, Hurricane Max, Ignition, and Killerwatt.
- Death Card (appearing in the first Barb Wire regular series).
- Death Card II (appearing in the Ace of Spades mini-series) - an assassin.
- Ignition II - Maureen Skach. Girlfriend of Boyd Mack, the original Ignition, a gang leader with pyrokinetic powers. Believing Mack was having an affair with Barb Wire, Skach kills him, then assumes the Ignition name and leadership of his gang.
- The Mask

== Film adaptation ==
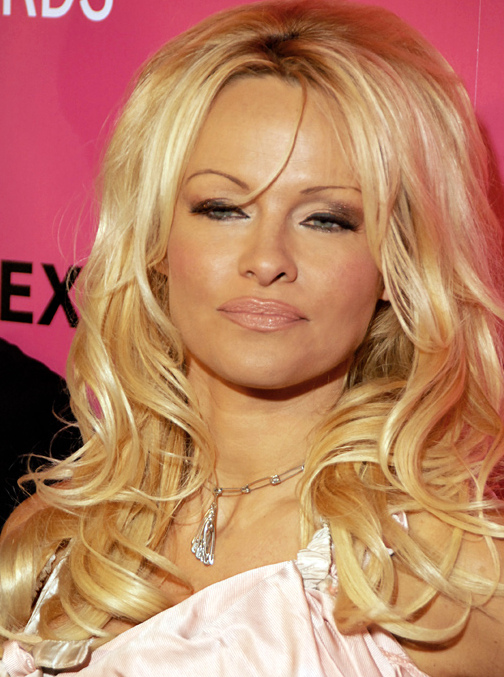
Pamela Anderson portrayed Barb Wire in the film adaptation of the same name

A film adaptation was released in 1996 starring Pamela Anderson as Barb Wire. The story's premise was that Barb Wire lives in the near future rather than an alternate version of the present day, a world where superhumans and Dark Horse superheroes do not exist. In this version of the story, Steel Harbor is the last neutral "free city" during the Second American Civil War, and Barbara Kopetski is a resistance fighter who leaves behind the war after her heart is broken and she loses faith in the cause. Like the comic, she returns home to become a bounty hunter and owner of the Hammerhead.
