= Agents of Law =

1995 comic book series

- Cover of the first issue

Publication information
- Publisher: Dark Horse Comics
- Format: Comic book
- Publication date: 1995
- No. of issues: 6
- Main character: Law

Creative team
- Created by: Keith Giffen, Lovern Kindzierski, Dan Lawlis, Ian Akin, Matt Clark, Chad Hunt, Jim Royal

Agents of Law was a series published by Dark Horse Comics in 1995.

It followed the story of Law, a powerful individual of dubious motives who took over Golden City after the events of Will to Power, which was the big event of the in-house Dark Horse line of superhero comics during the summer of 1994. It was a continuation of Catalyst: Agents of Change.

Despite massive hype by the publishing company prior to its release the series ultimately failed to survive the withering market of the time and the choice by Dark Horse to scale back their line of superhero comics, which had only recently been renamed.

Law was the first super villain to ever be killed by a Predator. See the last page of issue #6.

== Publication ==
- 1–5: Keith Giffen & Lovern Kindzierski, writers. Dan Lawlis, pencils. Ian Akin, inks.
- 6: Lovern Kindzeirski, writer. Matt Clark, pencils. Chad Hunt & Jim Royal, inks.

Note: Issue 5 had a cover by Doug Wheatley & Paul Guinann. The cover to issue 6 was by Wheatly with Mark Farmer.
