= Ghost/Batgirl: The Resurrection Machine =

- Cover to Ghost/Batgirl: The Resurrection Machine by Mike Kennedy and Ryan Benjamin.

Publication information
- Publisher: Dark Horse Comics; DC Comics
- Format: Limited series
- Publication date: 2001
- No. of issues: 4
- Main character(s): Ghost; Batgirl; Malcolm Greymatter; Two-Face

Creative team
- Written by: Mike Kennedy
- Artist(s): Ryan Benjamin

Ghost/Batgirl: The Resurrection Machine is a four-issue crossover miniseries starring Ghost of Dark Horse Comics and Batgirl of DC Comics. The trade paperback was released on June 27, 2001.

== Synopsis ==
Under the tutelage of Oracle, Batgirl investigates the bombing of the international Diamond Exchange which has resulted in severe casualties. Two-Face openly claims responsibility for the disaster but reports show that nothing is stolen, nor were there any high profile enemies at the scene that Two-face would consider targeting. Oracle's investigation lead to the city of Arcadia, where Ghost is on the search for Malcolm Greymatter, a Civil War veteran kept alive by his own scientific experiments.

=== Further details ===
Councilman Fletcher, while at a social event, reveals that his daughter is among six persons reported missing after the bombing of the International Diamond Exchange. Bruce Wayne mentions that no body has been recovered, and this may indicate she is not dead. The disheartened Councilman responds "if Harvey Dent has her, she may wish she were".

Wayne instinctively assumes Barbara Gordon may be planning a mission to apprehend Dent, and specifically warns her not to. He claims that Two-Face is Batman's responsibility, and adds that if Batman needs help, he will call.

Gordon, ignoring Wayne's order, plans a trip to investigate St. Mary's Hospital in Arcadia. Meanwhile, Ghost is investigating the disappearance of a young woman named Debbie Scoggins. Both she and Batgirl end up meeting for the first time at an underground nightclub. Although they are unable to communicate verbally, the two quickly realize their agendas are compatible.

=== Revelations ===
With the assistance of Oracle and Batgirl, Ghost comes face to face with Malcolm Greymatter, the mastermind behind the disappearances of numerous woman in Gotham and Arcadia. While Ghost believed Greymatter faked their deaths in order to sell them into servitude, he reveals their deaths were real and that he was responsible for reanimating their bodies through the use of his "resurrection machine".

=== Resolution ===
Two-Face seeks revenge on Greymatter for reanimating the corpses of henchmen he has killed himself, claiming them as property. The conflict is cut short as Ghost and Batgirl wreak havoc on Greymatter's heart of operations. Facing defeat, he destroys the base of operations with a bomb, leaving no evidence of the reanimated bodies or the resurrection machine. Ghost and Batgirl are unable to capture the villain.
