= Elseworld's Finest: Supergirl & Batgirl =

- Supergirl and Batgirl

Publication information
- Publisher: DC Comics
- Format: One-shot
- Publication date: September 1998
- No. of issues: 1
- Main character(s): Supergirl; Batgirl; Bruce Wayne; Lex Luthor; Joker; Emil Hamilton

Creative team
- Written by: Barbara Kesel; Matt Haley; Tom Simmons
- Penciller: Matt Haley
- Inker: Tom Simmons

Elseworld's Finest: Supergirl & Batgirl is an Elseworlds comic book by Tom Simmons, Matt Haley and Barbara Kesel.

It is based in an alternate universe in which Bruce Wayne was never Batman, and the infant Kal-El did not survive long enough to become Superman. The orphaned Barbara Gordon becomes Gotham City's near-dictatorial protector, and Kara Zor-El as the Girl of Steel teams with Lex Luthor and the Justice Society.

== Plot summary ==
Barbara Gordon is Batgirl, a crime-fighter who rules Gotham City with an iron fist. Wonder Woman and the rest of the Justice Society have been permitted to make a public announcement inside Gotham Arena, where they introduce Supergirl and Lex Luthor to the Gothamites for the first time. Lex announces his plans to construct a factory in Gotham, employing a large number of its citizens. Ambush Bug senses a disturbance and teleports to find Luthor's driver being attacked via gas by an unknown assailant. Batgirl stops him before he can investigate. As Lex leaves the arena, he is kidnapped by the Joker and Professor Hamilton.

As the news of the kidnapping reaches the JSA, Batgirl sets it upon herself to save Luthor single-handedly. Supergirl is told by Wonder Woman that Batgirl will not allow any metahumans to enter Gotham, but Supergirl becomes infuriated and rushes to Gotham anyway. Batgirl sees Supergirl as a threat to her mission. She confronts her but Supergirl avoids a lengthy battle by reasoning with Batgirl. Meanwhile, Professor Hamilton reveals that he is holding Luthor captive so that he can expose to the world how he and Lex discovered the solar battery. He claims that Lex ruined his life and reputation when he tried to reveal the truth to the world. The Joker has been using a mineral-based steroid-like serum to enhance his strength so that he can win Batgirl's attention. Luthor offers the Joker employment with the additional incentive of more of the minerals on which Hamilton based his steroid serum.

Batgirl and Supergirl start tracking Professor Hamilton and the Joker. Barbara leads Supergirl to an underground room, which is lead-lined and protected with a Kryptonite doorway. Batgirl leads Kara to a room and they discover the body of baby Kal-El, preserved in a test tube. This is the actual basis of Lex's "solar battery" invention, and the discovery makes Supergirl furious. Lex claims that he feared Kal-El would become dangerous, and that is why he killed him and befriended Supergirl when she arrived on Earth. Ready to meet her fury with Joker's strength, Luthor awaits while Batgirl and Supergirl rush towards him. Supergirl battles the Joker, but is unable to match his strength because the steroid serum he has been taking is infused with Kryptonite. Batgirl soon rescues her. Kara is about to kill Lex, but Batgirl stops her. Lex was the man who hired Joe Chill to murder Bruce's parents, which means he is also responsible for the death of Barbara's parents and must be brought to justice. Luthor, Hamilton and the Joker are arrested, and a friendship between Batgirl and Supergirl starts to grow, even to the point of an out-of-uniform Kara coming to Barbara's latest book signing.

== See also ==
- List of Elseworlds publications
