= CGW =

CGW may refer to:

- Chicago Great Western Railway, a Class I railroad that linked Chicago, Minneapolis, Omaha, and Kansas City
- Comics' Greatest World, an imprint of Dark Horse Comics
- Computer Gaming World, an American computer game magazine published between 1981 and 2006
- Counsel General for Wales
