= Catalyst: Agents of Change =

Comic book superhero team

- Catalyst: Agents of Change #01

Publication information
- Publisher: Dark Horse Comics
- First appearance: Comics' Greatest World: Golden City Week 4
- Created by: Barbara Kesel; Team CGW

In-story information
- Base(s): The Citadel, Golden City
- Member(s): Grace, Warmaker, Lamb, Flux, Wraith, Titan, Law, Madison, Mecha, Ruby, Rebel

Catalyst is a superhero team appearing in comics published by Dark Horse Comics under the imprint Comics Greatest World. It first appeared in Comics' Greatest World: Golden City Week 4. Important members of the team have included Grace, Law, and Titan.

== Team history ==
=== Formation: The Warmaker Incident ===
Warmaker, a former United States soldier turned supervillain, is sent by the government to be imprisoned in The Vault, a super-prison located in Golden City. He escapes (or is allowed to escape by Grace) and begins a rampage.

He faces various heroes. Rebel can fly and shoot energy blasts. Mecha is a tall, yellow, mechanical construct. Titan has flight, speed and superstrength. Ruby has bright red skin and can heal others. Warmarker causes massive amounts of destruction to the city, until Grace arrives to face him.

She easily defeats Warmaker, but Titan attacks him for no reason. Warmaker strikes Titan, knocking him into Rhapsody, the local healer. She falls into a nearby crater and dies of a broken neck.

Warmaker escapes. Grace uses this and the death of Rhapsody as a rallying point. She announces Golden City will secede from the United States of America.

=== Agents of Change ===
The US Government then offers Grace a deal; if she eliminates the man/alien called Vortex, which had emerged from a strange dimensional rift, they will concede to her secession. She travels to Cinnabar Flats and confronts first Vortex then fights with him against a group of Destroyers. Deciding Vortex's work is important, Grace returns to Golden City. The United States military then attacks Golden City.

Catalyst then battles the US Army and their armored super-soldier, Grenade. Grenade is killed but not before he releases radiation into the Wheatfield battleground. Grace is then able to use CNN media coverage to force the government to a settlement.

Creative Staff Information (by issue)

- 1–4: Eddie Campbell & Pete Ford, writers. Pencils, Tim Hamilton (also, Steve Carr #1). Shane Glines, inks.
- 5: Campbell & Ford, writers. Pencils, Eric Battle. Glines, inks.
- 6: Chris Warner, plot/Barbara Kesel, dialogue. Hamilton, pencils. Glines, inks.
- 7: Barbara Kesel, writer. Hamilton, pencils. Glines, inks.
- Covers for the entire series were provided by Jason Pearson.

=== Will to Power ===
Titan leaves the team to work for the government. This begins a downward spiral for him and he becomes progressively more and more demented. Grace takes the command of the situation placing Titan in the Vault, but he escapes and confronts the Catalyst team.

Realizing they are outgunned, Grace sends Titan to face down the man from the Vortex. She then teleports to Cinnabar Flats to warn Vortex of Titan's impending arrival. Titan's attack on the base kills Lt. Anderson a friend of Vortex. Angered, Vortex then kills Titan. He takes Anderson's body and enters the rift, leaving Grace to safeguard the base.

=== Law ===
Soon thereafter, Law arrives in Golden City carrying the body of a woman who appears to be Grace. Through murder and manipulation, Law is able to take control of the city and of Catalyst.

Madison is killed, Mecha and Warmaker leave the city. Rebel, who are in fact two brothers, come into conflict. Rebel-Mark savagely beats Rebel-Matt (placing him in a vegetative state). Eventually Mark is forced to realize he must, at frequent intervals, store his power within his brother's form, a situation that traumatizes him. With Titan already dead and Grace missing, this essentially bring an end to the team.

=== Return of Grace ===
However, a rebellion forms in Tent City, led by a mysterious hooded woman (Grace) and consisting of the members of Division 13 and Warmaker. Whether this group ever calls itself Catalyst or not has never been revealed. When Law is killed by a Predator, Grace and her team are there at the scene of his death.

== Team Members ==
=== Original Team ===
- Grace (AKA The Mighty Grace, Lady Grace) — The team's founder and current leader. She can create "diamonds" which she uses to teleport herself and others. She is also incredibly strong, able to survive in space without a suit, and can fly.
- Madison — Grace's confidant, he was killed by Law during his takeover of the team.
- Titan (Frank Wells) — One of Golden City's first heroes, left to work for the US government.
- Rebel (Matt and Mark Morissette)
- Mecha (Art Thomason)
- Ruby
- Warmaker (Elvis Westbury)

=== Agents of Law ===
- Law — a villain and Block 13 escapee (the first), he took over Catalyst when Grace disappeared. Killed by a Predator.
- Redline
- Sabrinna

Additionally, Rebel and Ruby were members of this version of the team.

=== The Tent City Resistance ===
Like the original incarnation of Catalyst, this group was led by Grace.

- Lamb (Officer Frank Lamb)
- Flux
- Wraith/Axe Grinder
- Voxx

Additionally, Warmaker was a member of this group.

== Bibliography ==
=== List of Appearances ===
- Comics' Greatest World: Golden City Week 1–4
- Catalyst: Agents of Change 1–7
- Will to Power 7–9
- Agents of Law 1-6

=== Significant Stories ===
- Comics' Greatest World: Golden City Week 4 – Team forms
- Catalyst: Agents of Change 4 – Titan leaves
- Agents of Law 1 – Law takes over, death of Madison
- Agents of Law 2 – Warmaker and Mecha leave
- Agents of Law 6 – Death of Law
