= Frank Kurtz (director) =

American film director

Frank Kurtz is a filmmaker, retailer, and editor, as well as the creator of the Creepsville comic book, which was originally published by Gogo Publications.

== Career ==
Later, Kurtz self-published Creepsville under the Laughing Reindeer Press imprint. Besides the original comics, the second run of the series also featured material related to Kurtz's fascination with junk culture, including movies, toys, Halloween, UFOs, and a number of other oddball subjects.

Credited as Joseph Kurtz, Frank co-wrote and co-directed a horror film titled Carnivore. This feature-length film was shot professionally on 16mm over a period of three years. In addition, along with a small crew, he designed and built the full body title monster suit, as well as providing additional make-up special effects along the way.

In the mid-1990s, Kurtz was managing editor of the comics-related news magazine HERO Illustrated, published by Sendai Publications. HERO won the 1995 Eisner Award for Best Comics Related Publications.

At the same company, later called MVP Media, Kurtz was the editor (as well as writing loads of editorial) for a best selling Roswell UFO Encyclopedia magazine. The magazine caught the attention of the press during the 50th anniversary of the so-called crash, prompting Kurtz to participate in television and radio interviews and talk shows. The magazine itself was seen nationally on network news, including NBC and CNN as well as a number of documentaries on the Roswell subject.

Kurtz was also an entertainment news and rumor reporter/editor for Cinescape Online magazine, and its website.

Kurtz is one of the co-creators and regular contributors of Monsterscene magazine. Within the pages of Monsterscene, Kurtz was able to pursue subjects such as Japanese giant monster movies, Mexican horror cinema, and an interview with Bob Burns that was the highlight of his participation there.
