= Will to Power (comics) =

Will To Power
- Cover of the first issue

Publication information
- Publisher: Dark Horse Comics
- Schedule: Weekly
- Format: Limited series
- Genre: Superhero
- Publication date: June - August 1994
- No. of issues: 12
- Main character(s): Titan; Grace; X Counterstrike; Vortex

Creative team
- Created by: Team CGW
- Written by: Team CGW
- Penciller(s): Mike Richardson; Chris Warner; Various
- Inker(s): Brian Apthorp; Tim Bradstreet; Various
- Colorist: Various

Will To Power was a twelve-issue limited series event published by Dark Horse Comics under their Comics Greatest World imprint. It was published in four three-issue arcs, with each arc focusing on one of CGW's four environs, Arcadia, Steel Harbor, Golden City, and the area surrounding the Vortex.

The story followed the descent of Titan from hero to villain. Other major characters included the X-killer (better known simply as X), Scream, Counterstrike, Mace Blitzkrieg, Wolf Pack, Grace and Catalyst, King Tiger, Lt. Anderson, and The Man from the Vortex.

This storyline was CGW's swansong. The imprint was changed to Dark Horse Heroes shortly after its completion.

== History ==
=== Titan joins the NSC ===
No longer able to work with Grace due to personal differences, Titan leaves Golden City to "find America." He eventually joins the NSC as a field operative. On his first mission he battles Dr. Stanley Kirby and his creations the Inhibitors. Working with Kirby is Titan's former partner Golden Boy. Several of the Inhibitors are killed including Golden Boy who is executed by NSC agents because he knows too much about Titan.

=== Arcadia: Operation: Peregrine ===
The vigilante X interrupts a shipment of cocaine disguised as bathroom sinks at the warehouse of the "Nutty Plumber" Roscoe Ligotti. Ligotti is actually a crime boss and uses his chain of plumber's helper stores as a front. Ligotti calls in a favor from Congressman DeMarco, to whom he had previously made "campaign contributions." DeMarco, a member of the NSC appropriations committee, arranges for Titan to be sent to take out X, who he calls a "local thug". DeMarco announces Titan's arrival in the city at a Waterfront press conference, during which X throws an active grenade at the congressman.

Titan takes the brunt of the blast, saving DeMarco and the others present. He then goes after X, but instead discovers Scream. Mistaking him for the X-killer, Titan attacks Scream, who in turn thinks Titan works for his archenemies, the evil phone company. Scream uses his sonic powers to disorient Titan sending him crashing off the building to an alley below where he finally comes face to face with X. Following X into the sewer, Titan is led into a confrontation with Monster. Titan disposes of the creature by throwing him into Suffolk Bay, but is again attacked by Scream's 'infrasonic vibrations' and falls into the bay after him.

The NSC pulls Titan out of the bay and he flies off after X. Catching up with the killer, they have a confrontation in a warehouse. X smashes a sink up side Titan's head, shattering it and releasing the cocaine it is made of into the air. X convinces Titan that he is a dupe for a drug lord, but Scream again attacks. However, this time rather that coming after the hero, Scream attacks a nearby sink. Titan knocks Scream out and goes after Ligotti. Titan threatens Ligotti but before he can get the source of the drugs out of Ligotti, the NSC arrives and forces Titan to release him. Monroe hints to Titan that the government not only wants Ligotti to stay in business, but also they are his bosses. Titan and the NSC agents leave to handle a situation in Steel Harbor, just as X arrives and saying how much he "liked those Nutty Plumber commercials", throws in a grenade killing Ligotti.

== Bibliography ==
Lead-Ins

- X Heroes Illustrated Special 1–2
- Titan Special 1

Main Story

- Will To Power 1–12

Aftermaths

- Catalyst: Agents of Change 6
- Out of the Vortex 10
