= Solus (comics) =

- Cover of Solus #1

Publication information
- Publisher: CrossGen
- Schedule: Monthly
- Format: Ongoing series
- Publication date: April – December 2003
- No. of issues: 8
- Main character(s): Solusandra aka Andra Radiant; Lindy Karsten formerly referred to as Radiant; Danik

Creative team
- Created by: Mark Alessi; Gina Villa
- Written by: Barbara Kesel
- Penciller: George Pérez
- Inker: Rick Magyar
- Colorist: Larry Molinar

Solus is an American comic book series written by Barbara Kesel and illustrated by George Pérez. It was published by CrossGen from April to December 2003. It ran for eight issues until it was cancelled when Crossgen went bankrupt in 2004. This series was a late comer to the Crossgen line-up, but was intended to serve as a pivotal title within the overall Sigilverse history.

== Plot synopsis ==
Solus told a story which was integral to the Sigilverse.

The main character, Solusandra, was the creator of the Sigil-Bearers. She was an Atlantean who had undergone transition. She was allowed to "play" in a part of the galaxy and she used her powers to create The First, demi-gods with great powers. The strongest of these demi-gods and her special friend was Altwaal. She gave Altwaal seven weapons, called Altwaal's Weapons, which seem to be the most powerful artifacts in the galaxy. Not long after she created the First, she left them (for reasons never explained) and so when she returned (in Solus #5) she was not recognized.

More recently, Solusandra was convinced by Danik to work with him in creating Sigil-Bearers. These modified humans were given great power (the ability to control and use the universal cosmic power). The purpose of the Sigil-Bearers was (eventually) to free Solusandra and defeat the other fully ascended Atlanteans. There were some disagreements between Danik and Solusandra in creating the Sigil-bearers. For example, Danik did not approve of Mordath as a Sigil-bearer, but Solusandra overruled him.

The other ascended Atlanteans figured out that Solusandra was doing something dangerous to them, so they attacked her. Their attack resulted in disaster. They all died, and Solusandra was nearly killed as well. She lost all of her memories and "died" on a dead planet, leaving Danik as the only "God", but after some years Solusandra revived and found her world filled with life and many glowing, floating bubbles containing her sign, the sigil. With her memory gone, she touched a sigil-bubble and was transported to the location of one of the sigil-bearers, a computer game designer named Lindy Karsten.

When Solusandra touches Lindy's sigil, suddenly Solusandra gains a portion of her memories back (and Lindy loses her Sigil and her powers). Lindy is very distressed to lose her sigil powers and so she follows Solusandra back through the portal onto Solusandra's world. The remaining episodes show Solusandra visiting other sigil-bearers (Brath Mac Garen, Mikos of Abyelos, Kellra Tuskin, and Giselle Villard). Each time, Solusandra gains more memories, except for Kellra Tuskin: she nearly drives Solusandra insane (#7). Solusandra also visits Elysia, home of The First to take back some of Atlwaal's weapons (the weapons also give Solusandra some memories back).

Early on, Solusandra destroyed Lindy Karsten's mentor (a fragment of Danik) called Infoe. This death told Danik that something powerful was awake but nothing more. Danik created a hound (looking like a huge skeleton of a dog made of flame). This hound chased Solusandra through several worlds, but Solusandra destroyed the hound and directly notified Danik of her location.

In the last episode (#8) Solusandra meets with Danik, her one-time ally, who seemingly restores all her memories. Solusandra then sends Lindy Karsten away and swears that she will fight the Negation.

== Collections ==
CrossGen announced two book titles for future trade paperback books that would collect the Solus series but these books were never published due to CrossGen's bankruptcy:

- Solus Volume 1: Genesis
- Solus Volume 2: Radiant
