= Imagemakers =

Imagemakers (IM) is a heritage interpretation and design consultancy based in Sticklepath, Devon. Established in 1989, Imagemakers work in the specialist field of strategic planning and design for heritage and tourism projects. Specific services include the production of interpretive strategies and funding packages, and the design of multi-faceted exhibitions, new media installations, outdoor displays, public art and websites.

== Recent projects ==
- Severn Valley Railway Engine House Museum, Shropshire – exhibitions, site branding and signage
- Heritage Lottery Fund ‘Thinking About Interpretation’ – HLF commission to write their new guidelines for those seeking funding for interpretive projects
- City of Chester Interpretation Master Plan – comprehensive plan for heritage-rich city
- Glen Affric Forest NNR Interpretation Strategy – strategy for Forestry Commission Scotland
- Foxton Locks, Leicestershire – outdoor 3D installations, seating, exhibition, site leaflet and MP3 audio trail for British Waterways and partners
- Carsington Water Visitor Centre, Derbyshire – exhibition interpreting sustainable water use for Severn Trent Water plc
