= Mike Richardson (publisher) =

American publisher, writer, and producer

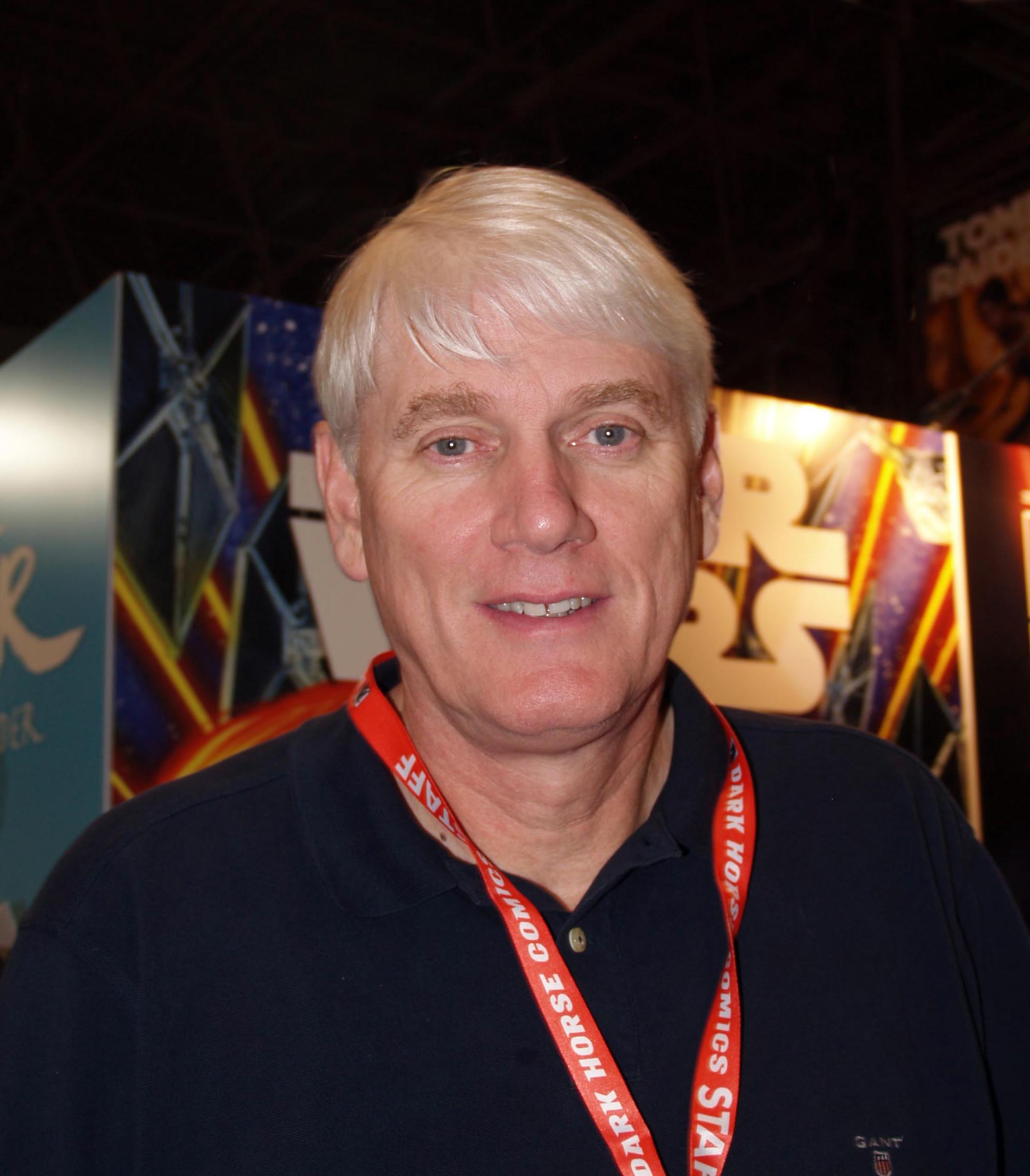
- Richardson at the 2013 New York Comic Con
- Born: June 29, 1950 (age 76) Portland, Oregon, U.S.
- Areas: Writer, Publisher
- Notable works: Dark Horse Comics; The Mask; Timecop; The Legend of Tarzan
- Awards: Emmy Award; Eisner Awards; Hugo Awards; Inkpot Award; Overstreet Comic Book Price Guide Hall of Fame

Mike Richardson (born June 29, 1950) is an American publisher, writer, and producer. In 1986, he founded Dark Horse Comics, an international publishing house located in Milwaukie, Oregon. Richardson is also the founder and President of the Things From Another World retail chain and president of Dark Horse Entertainment, which has developed and produced numerous projects for film and television based on Dark Horse properties or licensed properties.

In addition, he has written graphic novels and comics series, including: The Secret, Living with the Dead, and Cut as well as co-authoring two non-fiction books, Comics Between the Panels and Blast Off!.

== Early life ==
Richardson was born on June 29, 1950, in Portland, Oregon. His family moved to Milwaukie, a suburb of Portland, in 1955. He is a graduate of Portland State University, where he majored in art and played for the university basketball team.

== Career ==
While in college, Richardson built a freelance art client base and planned to start Dark Horse Graphics. In 1980, he left his job in Portland and moved to Bend, Oregon, with his wife and newborn daughter. Using a $2,500 credit card, he opened Pegasus Fantasy Books on January 1, 1980. Renamed Things From Another World in 1993, the store expanded into an 11-location chain across three states, including spots at Universal CityWalk and Sony's Metreon.

=== Dark Horse Comics ===
Richardson hosted signings at his stores, where creators voiced concerns over lacking control of their work. This inspired him to launch Dark Horse Comics, offering creators intellectual property rights. With Randy Stradley, Dark Horse debuted Dark Horse Presents #1 in July 1986, paying creators 100% of profits. Expecting 10,000 sales, it exceeded 50,000. Early successes included Concrete, Sin City, Hellboy, and The Goon.

Richardson also published manga including Lone Wolf and Cub, Akira, and Ghost in the Shell, later adding Blade of the Immortal and Oh My Goddess!.

In 1988, Dark Horse pioneered direct-sequel comics with Aliens, later applying this approach to Terminator, Predator, and Star Wars.

=== Dark Horse Entertainment ===
Hollywood took interest in Dark Horse Comics, prompting Richardson to ensure creator involvement in adaptations. To achieve this, he founded Dark Horse Productions (later Dark Horse Entertainment) in 1989. His first co-producer credit came with Dr. Giggles. His creations The Mask and Timecop (1994) became box office hits. In 2008, he won an Emmy for producing Mr. Warmth: The Don Rickles Project. Since 1992, Richardson and Dark Horse Entertainment have produced over 30 film and TV projects.

== Personal life ==
Richardson is married with children. He names Charles Dickens and James Ellroy as his favorite writers, and The Beatles' Sgt. Pepper's Lonely Hearts Club Band as his favorite album. He is also fond of basketball, guitars, and fine wine. He resides in Lake Oswego, Oregon.

== Nominations and awards ==
- 1997 Razzie Nomination for Barb Wire
- 1999 Eisner Awards Nominated Best Comics-Related Book – Comics Between the Panels – (author with Steve Duin)
- 2007 Emmy Nomination for Hellboy: Sword of Storms
- 2008 Emmy Award Won for Best Variety, Music, or Comedy Special – Mr. Warmth: The Don Rickles Project (producer)
- 2010 Overstreet Hall of Fame For contributions to comic book art.
- 2010 Governors' Gold Award – State of Oregon for Contribution to the Arts
- 2012 Eisner Awards: Won for Best Anthology – Dark Horse Presents (editor)
- 2012 Harvey Awards: Won for Best Anthology – Dark Horse Presents (editor)
- 2013 Eisner Awards: Won for Best Anthology – Dark Horse Presents (editor)
- 2013 Harvey Awards: Won for Best Anthology – Dark Horse Presents (editor)
- 2014 Eisner Awards: Won for Best Anthology – Dark Horse Presents (editor)
- 2012 Harvey Awards: Won for Best Anthology – Dark Horse Presents (editor)
- 2014 Eisner Awards: Nominated for Best Limited Series – 47 Ronin (writer)
- 2015 American Library Association named Richardson's 47 Ronin to its Great Graphic Novels for Teens list

== Bibliography ==
=== Comics ===
==== Editor ====
- Cheval Noir (#1–23 1989)
- Aqua Blue: The Blue Planet (1990)
- The Adventures of Luther (#1–9, 1990, ISBN 978-1-59307-725-9)
- Indiana Jones & The Fate (#1–4, 1991)
- Andrew Vachss’ Hard Looks (#1–10, 1992, 1-56971-209-2)
- Andrew Vachss' Hard Looks (1996)
- Dark Horse Presents (volume 2, #1–30, 2011)
- Dark Horse Presents (volume 3, #1–15, 2014)

==== Writer ====
- Boris the Bear (#1–12, 1986)
- Wacky Squirrel (#1–4, 1987)
- Wacky Squirrel Halloween Special (1987)
- Wacky Squirrel Summer Fun Special (#1, 1987)
- The Mark (1987)
- Godzilla (#1–6, 1988)
- Insane (#1–2, 1988)
- Indiana Jones and the Fate of Atlantis (#4, 1991, ISBN 978-1-87857-436-7)
- Aliens: Countdown (1991)
- Predator: The Bloody Sands (story, 1992)
- Aliens: Newt's Tale (1992)
- Comics Greatest World (#1–4, 1993)
- Will to Power (#1–12, 1994, ISBN 978-1-59307-364-0)
- The Mask: The Official Movie Adaptation (1994)
- Star Wars: Crimson Empire (1998, ISBN 978-1-56971-355-6)
- Terror of Godzilla (1999)
- Star Wars: Crimson Empire II: Council of Blood
- Star Wars: Crimson Empire: Council (1999, ISBN 978-1-56971-410-2)
- Aliens: Genocide (story, 2000)
- The Dark Horse Book of Hauntings: Gone (2003)
- Adventures of the Yellow Jacket (Monarch of the Moon DVD insert comic)
- Cravan: Mystery Man of the 20th Century (2005, ISBN 978-1-59307-291-9)
- Living With The Dead (2007, ISBN 978-1-59307-906-2)
- The Secret (#1–4, 2007, ISBN 978-1-59307-821-8)
- Cut (2008, ISBN 978-1-59307-845-4)
- Return of the Gremlins (2008, ISBN 978-1-61655-669-3)
- The Occultist (2012, ISBN 978-1-59582-745-6)
- Star Wars: Crimson Empire (2012, ISBN 978-1-56971-355-6)
- 47 Ronin (2013, ISBN 978-1-59582-954-2)
- The Atomic Legion (2014, ISBN 978-1-61655-312-8)
- Father's Day (2014, ISBN 978-1-61655-579-5)
- Underground (2014, ISBN 978-1-61655-416-3)
- Deep Gravity (2015, ISBN 978-1-61655-619-8)
- Echoes (2016)
- 51 Deep (2016)

=== Books ===
- Comics: Between the Panels (ISBN 1-56971-344-8)
- Blast Off: Rockets, Rayguns, Robots and Rarities (ISBN 978-1-61655-009-7)

== Filmography ==
=== Film ===
| Year | Film | Writer | Producer | Executive Producer | Director | Notes |
|---|---|---|---|---|---|---|
| 1992 | Dr. Giggles | | X mark | | Manny Coto | Co-producer |
| 1994 | The Mask | | | X mark | Chuck Russell | |
| 1994 | Timecop | X mark | | X mark | Peter Hyams | |
| 1995 | Enemy | | | X mark | Michael Katleman | Television film |
| 1996 | Barb Wire | | X mark | | David Hogan | Nominated — Razzie Award for Worst Picture |
| 1999 | Virus | | | X mark | John Bruno | |
| 1999 | Mystery Men | | X mark | | Kinka Usher | |
| 2003 | Timecop 2: The Berlin Decision | X mark | | | Steve Boyum | Direct-to-DVD |
| 2004 | Hellboy | | X mark | | Guillermo del Toro | |
| 2004 | Alien vs. Predator | | | X mark | Paul W. S. Anderson | |
| 2005 | Monarch Of The Moon | | | X mark | Richard Lowry | |
| 2005 | Splinter | | | X mark | Michael Olmos | |
| 2005 | Son of the Mask | | | X mark | Lawrence Guterman | |
| 2006 | Hellboy: Sword of Storms | | | X mark | Tad Stones; Phil Weinstein | Television film Nominated — Primetime Emmy Award for Outstanding Animated Program |
| 2006 | Driftwood | | X mark | | Tim Sullivan | |
| 2007 | Hellboy: Blood and Iron | | | X mark | Tad Stones; Phil Weinstein | Television film |
| 2007 | My Name Is Bruce | | | X mark | Bruce Campbell | |
| 2007 | 30 Days of Night | | | X mark | David Slade | |
| 2007 | Mr. Warmth: The Don Rickles Project | | X mark | | John Landis | Emmy Award winner |
| 2008 | Hellboy II: The Golden Army | | X mark | | Guillermo del Toro | |
| 2013 | R.I.P.D. | | X mark | | Robert Schwentke | |
| 2016 | The Legend of Tarzan | | | X mark | David Yates | |
| 2019 | Polar | | | X mark | Jonas Åkerlund | |
| 2019 | Hellboy | | X mark | | Neil Marshall | |
| 2024 | Hellboy: The Crooked Man | | X mark | | Brian Taylor | |
| 2026 | Kill Me | | X mark | | Peter Warren | |

=== Television ===
| Year | Series | Executive Producer | Notes |
|---|---|---|---|
| 1995–1997 | The Mask: Animated Series | X mark | |
| 1997–1998 | Timecop | X mark | |
| 1999–2001 | Big Guy and Rusty the Boy Robot | X mark | |
| 2012 | Dark Horse Motion Comics | X mark | Internet series |
| 2015–2017 | Dark Matter | X mark | |
| 2019–present | The Umbrella Academy | X mark | |
| 2021 | Coyote | X mark | |
| 2021–present | Resident Alien | X mark | |
| 2022 | Samurai Rabbit: The Usagi Chronicles | X mark | |
