= Hero Illustrated =

- Categories: Comics, criticism, interviews
- Frequency: monthly
- Publisher: Warrior Publications
- First issue: July 1993; 32 years ago
- Final issue Number: Spring 1996; 26
- Country: United States
- Based in: Lombard, Illinois
- Language: English

Hero Illustrated was a comic book-themed magazine published in the early to mid-1990s in the United States. Columnists included Andy Mangels, and Frank Kurtz was at one time a managing editor. The journal won the 1995 Eisner Award for Best Comics-Related Periodical/Publication.

== History ==
Hero Illustrated was published by Warrior Publications of Lombard, Illinois. Its premiere issue was dated July 1993 and it ceased publication in the spring of 1996.

== Specials ==
In addition to at least 26 regular issues, numerous specials were published, including Hero Premiere Editions (a series of ashcan copy printings of forthcoming comics), Hero Illustrated Specials, and Hero Special Editions.

- Hero Premiere Editions
  - Bone Holiday Special (1993)
  - Charlemagne (inside Hero Illustrated #9 (1993))
  - Extreme Hero (1994)
- Hero Illustrated Specials
  - Batman Special #1
  - Sci-Fi Special
  - Star Wars: Dark Empire #1
  - Top 100 Special
  - Villains Special #1
  - X Special: Will to Power
  - The X-Files (March 1995)
  - Year End Special 1993
  - Year End Special 1994
- Hero Special Editions
  - 1993: The Year in Comics ((vol. 1) 1994)
  - Comic Book Villains: The Baddest of the Bad - Anti-Hero Special Edition ((vol. 2) 1994)
  - The 100 Most Important Comics of All Time ((vol. 4) 1994)
  - Comic Book Who's Who: Complete Biographies on the Hottest Comic Book Characters! ((vol. 6) 1994)
  - Hero 1994 Yearbook: the ups and downs, the best and the worst, the people and the events that rocked the world in comics in 1994! ((vol. 8) 1994)
