= Alal =

One of the names of a Moon goddess

In Mesopotamian myths, the alal was a kind of demon that, to tempt men, came out of the Underworld and took various forms, temptations that the inhabitants of Babylonia were able to reject by means of amulets.

The Chaldean-Assyrian art represents these spirits in the form of horrible monsters, as in the bas-reliefs of the Palace of Ashurbanipal in Nineveh (now Iraq), today in the British Museum) and in small bronzes and clay tablets cooked in the shape of a cylinder, cone, or stamp.

Generally these demons are seen as theriocephalous, with a human body and the head of a lion with open jaws, the ears of a dog and mane of a horse. The feet are frequently replaced by bird claws of prey.

== See also ==
- Pazuzu
- Lamashtu
