= Steel Harbor =

Fictional comic book city

Steel Harbor is a fictional city, one of the settings in Dark Horse Comics' defunct Comics' Greatest World imprint. While the entire Team CGW was involved with the creation of each of the settings, Chris Warner was tasked with the majority of design for the Steel Harbor locale. The city was based on a combination of Detroit and Watts during the 1960s riots; however, in the comic, the violence is between powerful gangs fighting over territory.

One feature of the various Steel Harbor series was the commentary, supposedly on the radio, by a brassy talk-show host who bemoaned the plight of his city and called out the weak police and political powers in Steel Harbor for allowing the city to descend into such violence.

== Series set in Steel Harbor ==
Several series were set in Steel Harbor. Only Barb Wire was truly successful:

- Barb Wire
- The Machine
- Wolf Gang
- Motorhead

== Creative Staff ==
- Series 1-5: D.G.Chichester, writer; Karl Waller, pencils; Tim Bradstreet, inks; Simon Bisley, covers.
- Series 6: Chichester, writer; Waller, pencils; Eric Shanower, inks; Bisely, covers.
- Series 7-8: See 6. Note: Unofficially, the two issue King Tiger/Motorhead crossover consisted of the previously unpublished remaining issues of the series.
