= Chris Warner (comics) =

American comic book writer, artist, and editor

- Born: 1955 (age 70–71)
- Areas: Writer, Penciller, Inker, Editor
- Notable works: Aliens vs. Predator; Barb Wire; X

Chris Warner (born 1955) is an American comic book writer, artist, and editor for Dark Horse Comics. He worked extensively on their mid-1990s line of Comics' Greatest World and Dark Horse Heroes. Warner has also worked sporadically for other companies, such as DC Comics and Marvel Comics.

== Career ==
Warner illustrated several comics based on the Predator franchise and came up with the idea for an Aliens vs. Predator crossover. He is listed as the creator of Barb Wire and the developer of the setting of Steel Harbor for these lines. His work on this line includes writing and penciling the mini-series Barb Wire: Ace of Spades (#1–4), penciling issues #10–12 of X, being the image illustrator (i.e., the visual creator) of characters like Ghost and is given creator credit on Wolf Gang, Pit Bulls and Motorhead. He also worked on Will to Power (issues #4–6 as writer & #10–12 as penciler) and the second volume of Ghost, on which he acted as writer and later co-writer for the majority of that title's run. Warner later became a senior editor for Dark Horse.

== Bibliography ==
Comics work includes:

- Alien Legion (pencils #3–11/inker #3–5, 9–20, with Alan Zelenetz, 1984–1987, Epic Comics)
- Moon Knight vol. 2 (writer #5/pencils #1–5, with Alan Zelenetz and Jo Duffy, 1985, Marvel Comics)
- Doctor Strange vol. 2 #76–81 (pencils & cover art, with Peter B. Gillis 1986–1987, Marvel Comics)
- Strange Tales vol. 2 #1–4 (pencils, with Peter B. Gillis, 1987, Marvel Comics)
- Batman #408 (pencils & cover art, with Max Allan Collins, 1987, DC Comics)
- The American #1–6, 8 (pencils & cover art, with Mark Verheiden, 1987–1989, Dark Horse Comics)
- Predator:
  - Concrete Jungle #1–4 (pencils & cover art, with Mark Verheiden and Ron Randall, 1989–1990, Dark Horse Comics)
  - The Bloody Sands of Time #1–2 (inker, with Dan Barry, 1992, Dark Horse Comics)
  - Bad Blood #1–2 (inker, with Evan Dorkin and Derek Thompson, 1993, Dark Horse Comics)
  - Hunters #1–5 (writer, with Francisco Ruiz Velasco, 2017, Dark Horse Comics)
- Aliens Versus Predator:
  - Original #4 (with Randy Stradley and Phill Norwood, 1990, Dark Horse Comics)
  - Aliens vs. Predator II (artist, with Randy Stradley, in Dark Horse Insider vol. 2 #1–14, 1992–1993, Dark Horse Comics)
  - Aliens versus Predator: War #0 (artist, with Randy Stradley, 1995, Dark Horse Comics)
- Terminator:
  - Tempest #1–4 (pencils, with John Arcudi, 1990–1991, Dark Horse Comics)
  - Hunters and Killers #1–3 (writer, with Toren Smith, Adam Warren and Bill Jaaska, 1992, Dark Horse Comics)
- Batman Versus Predator #1–3 (cover art, with Dave Gibbons and Andy Kubert, 1991–1992, DC Comics and Dark Horse Comics)
- Ghost Rider/Blaze: Spirits of Vengeance #2–3 (inker, with Howard Mackie and Adam Kubert, 1992, Marvel Comics)
- Comics Greatest World: Arcadia #1 (pencils, with Mark Richardson, 1993, Dark Horse Comics)
- Comics Greatest World: Steel Harbor #1–4 (writer, with Paul Gulacy, 1993, Dark Horse Comics)
- Aliens:
  - Colonial Marines #1–3 (writer, with Tony Akins, 1993–1994, Dark Horse Comics)
- Will To Power (writer #4–6/pencils #10–12, 1994, Dark Horse Comics)
- X #10–12 (artist & cover art, with Steven Grant 1994–1995, Dark Horse Comics)
- Team 7: Operation Hell #1–3 (artist, with Chuck Dixon, 1995, Wildstorm/Image Comics)
- Barb Wire: Ace of Spades #1–4 (writer/pencils/cover art, 1998, Dark Horse Comics)
- Ghost vol. 1 #28–31 (cover art, 1997–1998, Dark Horse Comics)
- Ghost vol. 2 #1–16 (writer, 1998–2000, Dark Horse Comics)
- Star Wars Infinities: A New Hope #1–8 (writer, with Drew Johnson, 2001, Dark Horse Comics)
- Barb Wire #1–8 (writer, with Pat Olliffe, 2015–2016, Dark Horse Comics)
