= Dark Horse Presents =

Comic book published by Dark Horse Comics

- Cover of Dark Horse Presents (vol. 1) #1.

Publication information
- Publisher: Dark Horse Comics
- Schedule: Monthly
- Format: Ongoing series
- Publication date: Volume 1 July 1986 – September 2000 MDHP; July 2007 – August 2010 Volume 2 April 2011 – May 2014 Volume 3 August 2014 – April 2017
- No. of issues: 157 (Volume 1); 36 (MDHP); 36 (Volume 2); 33 (Volume 3)

Dark Horse Presents is a comics anthology published by American company Dark Horse Comics starting from 1986. Their first published series, it was their flagship title until its September 2000 cancellation. The second incarnation was published on MySpace, running from July 2007 until August 2010. A third incarnation began in April 2011, released in print form once again; it lasted until May 2014. Volume three of the print anthology debuted in August 2014, lasting until April 2017.

== Publishing history ==
=== Volume 1 ===
Dark Horse Presents was conceived as an anthology title and was the first comic to be released by the newly formed Dark Horse Comics in 1986. The first issue featured Black Cross on the cover and featured the first appearance of Paul Chadwick's Concrete. The title became successful thanks to the increasing popularity of Concrete which quickly became the regular cover feature for much of the first few years of the title.

Concrete eventually spun off into its own title, and this was something which would happen to several characters and stories appearing in Dark Horse Presents. These included John Byrne's "Next Men" comic book, as well as Frank Miller's Sin City stories, with the first "Sin City" story (later retitled "The Hard Goodbye") being serialized within the pages of the comic. The title also contained stories featuring Dark Horse's licensed comics, Aliens and Predator, as well as a Buffy the Vampire Slayer story.

Dark Horse Presents was Dark Horse's longest running title, and provided a mix of material from established and new creators. The title ended with issue #157 in September 2000.

Winner of the Eisner Award for "Best Anthology" - 1992, 1994

Winner of the Harvey Award for "Best Anthology" - 1992, 1993, 1995, 1997, 1998

=== MDHP ===
Dark Horse Presents was revived online through the social networking website MySpace. The first issue of MDHP featured new talents as well as well-known writers like Joss Whedon and Ron Marz. MDHP ran from August 2007 to July 2010, a total of thirty-six issues which were collected in six trade paperbacks.

=== Volume 2 ===
Dark Horse Presents returned as an eighty-page anthology comic on April 20, 2011 with all-new stories including a Concrete story by Paul Chadwick, a Mr. Monster story by Michael T. Gilbert, a Crimson Empire story from the Star Wars universe, a new strip called Marked Man by Howard Chaykin, a strip called Blood by Neal Adams (his first work for Dark Horse), and a sneak peek of Frank Miller’s prequel to 300, Xerxes. Two covers were available for the first issue, one featuring Concrete and the other featuring Xerxes. The new DHP has seen the revival of a number of older Dark Horse properties, including Ghost (leading to the launch of a new monthly title) and Ron Randall's Trekker.

Dark Horse's May 2014 solicitations for the 36th issue announced "...Living legends Mike Mignola, Stan Sakai, and Jaime Hernandez all contribute to this final issue of Dark Horse Presents", although the following day Bleeding Cool reported this was merely the end of the comic in the eighty-page format, and it would return with fewer pages at a later date.

Winner of the Eisner Award for "Best Anthology" – 2012, 2013, 2014

Winner of the Harvey Award for "Best Anthology" – 2012, 2013, 2014, 2015

=== Volume 3 ===
Beginning in August 2014, Dark Horse Presents returned as a forty-eight-page book. According to Dark Horse's Mike Richardson: "The main reason is that for three and a half years we've been producing eighty pages a month – that's about ten different features – and it's time to make it a little easier on ourselves". This volume ended in 2017 with issue 33.
