= Matt Haley =

American comic book artist

- Born: June 10, 1970 (age 56) Houston, Texas, U.S.
- Area: Artist

Matt Haley (born June 10, 1970) is an American film director, art director and book illustrator artist. He was the art director of Morgan Spurlock's Comic-Con Episode IV: A Fan's Hope feature documentary, which debuted at the 2010 Toronto International Film Festival. He was the artist and creative consultant for both seasons of Stan Lee's TV series Who Wants to Be a Superhero. Notable comic book works include Ghost (Dark Horse Comics), Elseworld's Finest: Supergirl and Batgirl, Batman: Batgirl, the Superman Returns movie adaptation (DC Comics), and The Order (Marvel Comics).

Haley was the artist behind FOX's motion comic Gotham Stories, as well as being published online to promote the new season of Gotham.
