= Team CGW =

Team CGW, short for Team Comics' Greatest World, is the group of five creators of the Comics' Greatest World line for Dark Horse Comics.

The members are:

- Mike Richardson, Dark Horse Comics' Publisher
- Randy Stradley, creative director
- Barbara Kesel, managing editor
- Jerry Prosser, editorial coordinator
- Chris Warner, explained editor/designer

With the exception of Richardson, who wrote the 1 page prologue at the beginning of each issue, each of the members wrote one of the four environment introductions: Stradley wrote The Vortex, Kesel wrote Golden City, Prosser wrote Arcadia, and Warner wrote Steel Harbor and penciled Arcadia Week 1 and Steel Harbor Week 3. Warner was also the Steel Harbor Week 3 cover artist.

== After Team CGW ==
The group stayed mostly in charge of the line until it was replaced by and absorbed into Dark Horse Heroes. That line was headed by group editor Michael Eury and line editors Marilee Hord and Greg Vest.
