= Comics' Greatest World =

Dark Horse Comics imprint

Comics' Greatest World was an imprint of Dark Horse Comics. It was created by Team CGW. Originally conceived in 1990, it took three years for the line to be released, which led to an industry-wide perception that it was created to capitalize on the speculator mania of the early 1990s. When the mania ended, most of the titles were canceled. Ghost, one of the imprint's more unorthodox titles, managed to survive the longest. It was canceled twice, first in early 1998, before being revived later that year and canceled again after a run of just less than two years.

All Comics' Greatest World titles took place in a shared universe. Most of the action centered on four cities in a slightly skewed version of America: Arcadia, Golden City, Steel Harbor, and the Cinnibar Flats area of Nevada, home of an interdimensional rift called the "Vortex".

The series started off with a story in Dark Horse Comics before kicking off in four weekly limited series, introducing the cities and characters. These were followed by several short-lived series, one-shots, and mini-series. Only a few titles lasted very long.

Around April 1995, the imprint was renamed "Dark Horse Heroes". With the name change, the use of the city logos was also dropped. April 1995 was also when the movie "Barb Wire" (1996), based on the Dark Horse Comics, started filming.

== Environs ==
=== Arcadia ===
First appearance: Dark Horse Comics #8 (intro of X)

It is a city of corrupt officials and organized crime. The policemen who are not on the take are criminals in their own right.

Major characters:

- X
- Ghost
- Focus (Ghost)
- Silhouette (Ghost)
- Carmine Tango (X)

Other characters:

- Monster (Comics' Greatest World, Will to Power, X)
- Pit Bulls (Comics' Greatest World, X)
- Scream (Hero Illustrated: X Special - Will to Power)
- Lt. Lewis
- Congressman DeMarco
- Commissioner Anderson
- Mayor Teal

=== Golden City ===
Major characters:

- Grace
- Titan
- Catalyst: Agents of Change (a group of heroes)
- Law (introduced in Division 13 #1)

Other characters:

- Madison
- Ruby
- Rebel
- Warmaker

=== Steel Harbor ===
Major characters:

- Barb Wire
- Motorhead
- The Machine

Other characters:

- Mace Blitzkrieg
- Wolf Hunter
- Ignition
- Charlie

=== The Vortex and surrounding areas ===
Major characters:

- Lt. Anderson
- Vortex
- Division 13
- Law
- Hero Zero (Comics' Greatest World, Will to Power, Out of the Vortex)
- King Tiger (Comics' Greatest World, Will to Power, Ghost)

== Storylines ==
=== The original mini-series ===
The original Comics' Greatest World mini-series comprised 16 weekly issues divided into four environments, each with four issues. The story followed a group of searchers from the Reaver Swarm coming to Earth to track down the Heretic. Each issue also featured a one-page prologue detailing the Heretic's experiments on Earth during the 1930s and 1940s, which ended in an accident that resulted in the metahuman activity on the planet.

==== Major characters ====
- X (weeks 1–4)
- Grace (weeks 5–8)
- Barb Wire (weeks 9–12)
- Motorhead (weeks 9–12)
- Lt. Anderson (weeks 13–16)
- Vortex

==== Issues ====
- Prelude: Dark Horse Comics #8-10: "Who is X?" (reprinted in X: One Shot to the Head)
- Comics' Greatest World: Sourcebook
- Arcadia Week 1: X (cover by Frank Miller)
- Arcadia Week 2: Pit Bulls
- Arcadia Week 3: Ghost (cover by Dave Dorman)
- Arcadia Week 4: Monster
- Golden City Week 1: Rebel (cover by Jerry Ordway)
- Golden City Week 2: Mecha
- Golden City Week 3: Titan
- Golden City Week 4: Catalyst: Agents of Change (cover by George Pérez)
- Steel Harbor Week 1: Barb Wire
- Steel Harbor Week 2: The Machine
- Steel Harbor Week 3: Wolf Gang (cover by Chris Warner)
- Steel Harbor Week 4: Motorhead
- Vortex Week 1: Division 13
- Vortex Week 2: Hero Zero
- Vortex Week 3: King Tiger (cover by Geoff Darrow)
- Vortex Week 4: Out of the Vortex (cover by Frank Miller)

=== Will to Power ===
Titan, following his exit from Golden City, goes to work for the United States government and comes into contact with all the major characters of the line.

==== Major characters ====
- Titan

==== Issues ====
- Titan Special #1 (lead-in)
- Will to Power #1-3 (Arcadia)
- Will to Power #4-6 (Steel Harbor)
- Will to Power #7-9 (Golden City)
- Will to Power #10-12 (Vortex)

=== Hunting the Heroes ===
Hunting the Heroes was a "theme" series. The individual stories were unrelated and could be read in any order. Released in 1995, this series pitted the Heroes against the Predator, a hunter from another universe. A group of Predators (the aliens from the Predator movies) arrives on Earth and begins hunting various CGW heroes.

==== Major characters ====
- X
- Ghost
- Motorhead
- Law

==== Issues ====
- X #18
- Ghost #5
- Motorhead #1
- Agents of Law #6

== Titles ==
=== Special cases ===
- 9 issues of Dark Horse Comics featured CGW stories, including the very first CGW story, the 3-part "Who is X?" (#8-10, later reprinted as X: One Shot to the Head); #19-20 (X); #21-22 (Mecha); and #23-24 (The Machine).
- At least 4 issues and 1 annual of Dark Horse Presents: #144 (Vortex), #145-147 (Ghost)
- A Ghost story was featured in A Decade of Dark Horse #2.
- Also, the Nexus story in A Decade of Dark Horse #3 featured theme park rides of Ghost and Barb Wire, and Hero Zero made a cameo appearance in a story in The Mask.

== Collected editions ==
During the initial publication period, a black-covered trade paperback was given to retailers as an ordering incentive during the fourth week of each month in the 16-week period. The covers featured the embossed foil logo of the city they represented.

Dark Horse has published a handful of Comics' Greatest World/Dark Horse Heroes titles in omnibus form.

- Dark Horse Heroes Omnibus, Vol. 1 – Collects the Comics' Greatest World and Will to Power maxi-series, plus a written summary of the events in between by Chris Warner (January 2008, ISBN 978-1-59307-734-1).
- X Omnibus, Vol. 1 – Collects X #1-11, X: One Shot to the Head, "Welcome to the Jungle" from Dark Horse Comics #19-20, X: Hero Illustrated Special #1-2 (May 2008, ISBN 978-1-59307-939-0).
- X Omnibus, Vol. 2 – Collects X #12-25, "Someone to Watch Over Me" from Dark Horse Extra #28-31 (August 2008, ISBN 978-1-59307-940-6).
- Barb Wire Omnibus, Vol. 1 – Collects all the original Dark Horse Barb Wire tales, including the Ace of Spades series (September 2008, ISBN 978-1-59307-993-2).
- Ghost Omnibus, Vol. 1 – Collects Ghost #1-12, Ghost Special #1, "Sweet Things" from Decade of Dark Horse #2 (October 2008, ISBN 978-1-59307-992-5).

== Crossovers ==
- Godzilla (with Hero Zero)
- Nexus (with Vortex; title canceled before release)
- Predator (with X, Ghost, Motorhead, Agents of Law)
- The Shadow (with Ghost)
- Hellboy (with Ghost)
- Batgirl (with Ghost)
- The Mask (with all characters and locations)
