= Dark Horse Comics =

American publisher

- Parent company: Dark Horse Media
- Status: Active
- Founded: February 4, 1986; 40 years ago
- Founder: Mike Richardson
- Country of origin: United States
- Headquarters location: Milwaukie, Oregon, U.S.
- Distribution: Penguin Random House Publisher Services
- Key people: Jay Komas, Interim-CEO; Neil Hankerson, Executive VP and COO
- Publication types: Comics, graphic novels, manga, art books, novels
- Fiction genres: Horror; Thriller; Terror; Crime; Superhero; Fantasy; Science fiction; Action; Adventure; Science fantasy; Mystery; Comedy; Dark fantasy
- Imprints: imprint labels
- Owner: Embracer Group
- Official website: darkhorse.com

Dark Horse Comics (stylized as DARK HORSE COMICS), is an American comic book, graphic novel, and art book publisher founded in Milwaukie, Oregon, by Mike Richardson in 1986. The company was created using funds earned from Richardson's chain of Portland, Oregon, comic book shops known as Pegasus Books and founded in 1980.

Dark Horse Comics is the fourth-largest comic publishing company in the United States. Dividing profits with artists and writers, as well as supporting artistic and creative rights in the comic book industry, Dark Horse Comics has become a proponent of publishing licensed material that may not fit into mainstream media. Several titles include: Sin City, Hellboy, Buffy the Vampire Slayer, 300, Ninja Gaiden, Masters of the Universe and Star Wars.

In December 2021, Swedish gaming company Embracer Group launched its acquisition of Dark Horse Media, Dark Horse Comics' parent company, and completed the buyout in March 2022.

Dark Horse Comics created Dark Horse Direct, a division for high-end collectible figures. Made primarily from resin, vinyl and PVC, their statues are available through a direct-to-consumer model.

== Overview ==
Dark Horse has published licensed comics, including comics based on Star Wars, Avatar: The Last Airbender, Ninja Gaiden, Buffy the Vampire Slayer, Aliens, Predator, and Terminator. Dark Horse Comics allows creators to retain ownership of their work. Mike Richardson founded the company to support creator rights, stating his frustration with artist treatment.

They have published creator-owned comics such as Frank Miller's Sin City and 300, Mike Mignola's Hellboy, Stan Sakai's Usagi Yojimbo, and Gerard Way's Umbrella Academy. Dark Horse Comics also publishes mini and limited series. This model allows the company to pull poorly performing series while also retaining the ability to reprint past works without intense scrutiny.

In 2006, The New York Times reported that "Dark Horse pays by the story or the page, and shares profit generated by comic books and related merchandise. That is different from the standard work-for-hire arrangement at DC and Marvel: creators are paid for a specific story and perhaps receive royalties from collected editions, but the bulk of the revenue, and all of the merchandising opportunities, remain with the companies".

== History ==
Dark Horse Comics headquarters, 2019

=== Origins ===
Mike Richardson was an active follower of the Amateur Press Association (APA), an organization focused on critiquing comics through conventions, fan projects, and newsletters. As a result of his involvement, Richardson became acquainted with Randy Stradley, an early Dark Horse Comics collaborator and editor. The two used their contacts from the APA to recruit artists and writers, many of whom were working for several top comic publishing groups.

=== 1986–2006 ===
Dark Horse was founded in 1986 by Mike Richardson with Dark Horse Presents No. 1 and featured the first appearance of Paul Chadwick's Concrete and Chris Warner's Black Cross, selling approximately 50,000 copies, which was far better than predictions. The series has become a platform for new creators to highlight their works. The success of Dark Horse Comics can be attributed to a change in comic book marketing that occurred in the 1980s when comics began to be sold in comic specific stores.

After his success, Richardson began buying the rights to several titles including: Godzilla in 1987, Aliens, Predator in 1989, and Star Wars in 1991 (owned by Marvel prior to the Dark Horse Comics acquisition). Dark Horse evolved further and began producing toys in 1991. In 1992, Richardson formed Dark Horse Entertainment, the company's film and television division.

With the release of the first Aliens comic in 1988 and Predator in 1988, Dark Horse Comics' popular characters appeared in their own line of work as well as Dark Horse Presents and Tarzan and numerous crossovers that included Superman and Batman of DC Comics, and WildC.A.T.s.

In a 1991 issue of Dark Horse Presents, Frank Miller introduced Sin City, one of Dark Horse Comics' most successful titles. In addition to this title, Miller introduced several other limited series set in dystopian societies including Give Me Liberty which ran from 1990 to 1991 and Hard Boiled.

The Mask, a miniseries from Mark Badger, debuted in Dark Horse Presents 10-20 in 1991 and had a successful film adaptation, starring Jim Carrey, in 1994. However comic sales were not strengthened by the success of the film.

In 1993, Dark Horse established their own limited series superhero realm with the creation of Comics' Greatest World. However, comic publishing changed in the 1990s and all Comics' Greatest World titles were canceled except for Ghost. As a result, Dark Horse Comics returned to their smaller-scale business model.

Dark Horse Comics created the imprint Legends and as part of their focus on creators, the publisher began working with Mike Mignola. In 1994, Mignola's character Hellboy first appeared in Hellboy: Seed of Destruction the beginning of several limited and miniseries with crossovers that included Batman of DC Comics.

1994 saw the release of the monthly manga miniseries, Oh My Goddess!

The licensing to the limited series, Tarzan, was purchased by Dark Horse Comics in 1995 and ended in 1998.

Ghost, from Comics' Greatest World, began running as a solo title in 1995, but ended in 1998 and was subsequently launched once more the same year.

Eisner Award winning Usagi Yojimbo, written and drawn by third-generation Japanese-American artist, Stan Sakai debuted in Dark Horse Comics in 1996 as a monthly issue and ran until 2019.

Dark Horse Comics began translating the manga series from Hiroaki Samura, Blade of the Immortal, in 1996 and ending in 2015.

For the first Free Comic Book Day on May 4, 2002, Dark Horse Comics published Star Wars: Tales – A Jedi's Weapon and has participated in the event every year since.

=== 2006–2021 ===
In 2006, Dark Horse was the third largest comics publisher. Per Diamond Comic Distributors, "Marvel had 36.9 percent of the market", DC "had 32.9 percent" and Dark Horse had "5.6 percent".

In 2007, Dark Horse began donating copies of all of its published works to the Portland State University Library. As of July 15, 2016, the library has cataloged over 10,000 titles as "the official repository of Dark Horse publications".

In 2011, Dark Horse Presents relaunched including the return of Paul Chadwick's Concrete and Steve Niles' Criminal Macabre, as well as new talent including Sanford Greene, Carla Speed McNeil, Nate Crosby and others. Starting in 2013, Dark Horse began to reprint EC Archives, picking up the project of reprinting classic EC Comics from the 1950s where Gladstone left off, using the same size and format as Gladstone, with all stories reprinted in order and in full color. In 2015, Dave Marshall was promoted to editor-in-chief and Scott Allie became Executive Senior Editor.

In early 2017, Dark Horse Comic entered partnership with Crypton Future Media to publish official English-language Hatsune Miku-related manga. In late summer of 2018, a set of comic books for Mysticons were released. In 2018, Vanguard Visionary Associates, a Chinese media production company, became a partner of Dark Horse's subsidiary Dark Horse Entertainment along with a "major investment stake" in the subsidiary. Both Forbes and Publishers Weekly reported that "the investment stake is rumored to be about $20 million and will give Vanguard a majority interest in Dark House".

In 2020, Dark Horse announced it was severing ties with writer and editor Scott Allie "after a former Dark Horse employee accused him of sexual harassment and sexual assault across a period lasting more than a decade." It was reported that in 2015, "after reports of multiple instances of sexual misconduct" by Allie:

Dark Horse Comics founder Mike Richardson released a statement to The Beat, which in part read, "In this particular case, action was taken immediately, though we did not, and cannot, perform a public flogging, as some might wish." Although Richardson said action had been taken, Allie continued as an editor for Dark Horse, transitioning from editor-in-chief to the role of executive senior editor in 2015, before departing Dark Horse as a full-time employee in 2017, continuing to work with them [until 2020] in a freelance capacity.

In June 2021, Dark Horse opened a video game and digital division, called Dark Horse Games. The division will be focused on development of AAA video games based on the company's IP. In September 2021, Freddye Miller became the Managing Editor.

In mid-November 2021, Dark Horse founder and CEO Mike Richardson announced that the company would be publishing a new line of all-ages Star Wars comics and graphic novels in collaboration with Lucasfilm and Disney Publishing Worldwide. Dark Horse had previously held the licensing rights for producing Star Wars comics between 1991 and 2015.

=== Acquisition by Embracer Group (2021–present) ===
In December 2021, Bloomberg reported that Dark Horse was for sale to a Hollywood studio. Companies rumored as potential buyers included Netflix, and The Walt Disney Company but a representative could not comment. Later in the month, Embracer Group, a video game holding company, announced that it launched its acquisition of Dark Horse Media, including Dark Horse Comics and Dark Horse Entertainment, and that the company would be the tenth operative division in the company.

The deal granted both companies access to each other's intellectual properties. Embracer finalized the acquisition of Dark Horse on March 14, 2022.

On March 4, 2026, Mike Richardson was dismissed from Dark Horse and replaced by Jay Komas as interim CEO. In May 2026, Dark Horse employees announced the formation of Dark Horse Workers United, "a union affiliated with the Communications Workers of America" (CWA). In June 2026, Komas announced that the company would give the union voluntary recognition which allows them move to collective bargaining. ICv2 reported that Dark Horse is "the third comics publisher with a union affiliated with the CWA".

In July 2026, Dark Horse announced a new leadership structure with three heads for the company: Tim Wiesch, head of publishing and business development; Vanessa Todd-Holmes, head of publishing operations; and Melissa Teeman, head of finance and administration. As of July 2026, Kormas "is still listed as interim CEO".

== Distribution ==
In June 2022, Dark Horse announced a business partnership with Penguin Random House Publishing as the company's new primary comic book distributor which was previously held by Diamond Comics Distributors for thirty years. In September 2022, Dark Horse Comics announced the expansion of their business relationship with Penguin Random House. This multi-year distribution deal began in June 2023.

== Imprints and studios ==
=== Comics' Greatest World/Dark Horse Heroes (1993–1996) ===
From 1993 to 1996, Dark Horse published a line of superhero comics under the Comics' Greatest World imprint, which was later renamed Dark Horse Heroes. After 1996, publication of this line came to a near halt, ceasing production of any books concerning the characters with the publication of the last crossover books involving Ghost, in the early 2000s.

=== Legend (1994–1998) ===
Legend was a comic book imprint at Dark Horse Comics created in 1994 by Frank Miller and John Byrne as an avenue for creator-owned projects. Its logo was a moai drawn by Mike Mignola. Later on, other creators were asked to join them. The imprint ended in 1998.

==== Members ====
- Art Adams
- Frank Miller
- John Byrne
- Mike Mignola
- Paul Chadwick, Dave Gibbons, and Geof Darrow were also on the initial Dark Horse Legend launch tour.
- Mike Allred
- Walter Simonson

=== Dark Horse Manga ===
Dark Horse Manga is an imprint for Japanese manga translated into English. The company's first ongoing title was Oh My Goddess! by Kōsuke Fujishima, starting in August 1994. Oh My Goddess! since became America's longest-running manga series. Other publications include Akira, Astro Boy, Berserk, Blade of the Immortal, Ghost in the Shell, Lone Wolf and Cub, Trigun and Blood Blockade Battlefront by Yasuhiro Nightow, Gantz, Hellsing and Drifters by Kouta Hirano, Blood+, Multiple Personality Detective Psycho, FLCL, Mob Psycho 100, and Oreimo.

Dark Horse formerly published a number of titles by the all-female Japanese manga artist group CLAMP, including Clover, Chobits, Cardcaptor Sakura, Magic Knight Rayearth. These titles are now published by Kodansha. Gate 7 and Okimono Kimono are still published by Dark Horse.

A manga magazine titled Super Manga Blast! was published by Dark Horse starting in the spring of 2000. It was discontinued in December 2005 after 59 issues.

Dark Horse also publishes a number of Korean manhwa titles, including Banya: The Explosive Delivery Man.

=== Maverick (1999–2002) ===
Maverick was an imprint for creator-owned material.

=== DH Press ===
The DH Press imprint publishes novelizations of Dark Horse's more popular comic book titles, including Aliens and Predator. DH Press has now been absorbed by DH Books.

=== M Press ===
Publications ranging from novels to film books by Leonard Maltin about John Landis, to comic related material such as a biography of Will Eisner, to health books. They have also published a series reprinting Playboy interviews. The M Press imprint was created to publish a diverse list of both literary fiction and non-fiction prose for authors with a unique voice. One such series is Orchid by Tom Morello, published from 2011 to 2013. The newest addition to M Press is an original graphic novel The Fifth Beatle by Vivek Tiwary, Andrew Robinson, and Kyle Baker, published in November 2013.

=== Dark Horse Digital ===
In 2011, Dark Horse launched their iOS app and online digital comics store Dark Horse Digital, followed by the release of the beta version of a native Android app in 2012. Any device with a modern web browser can be used to read Dark Horse comics at their web store. As of February 24, 2025, Dark Horse Digital has closed. No further sales will be offered on the DHD website but users can still log in and read the comics on their bookshelf.

=== DH Deluxe ===
Initiated in 1998, Dark Horse Deluxe rolled out a line of merchandise that included model kits, toys, apparel, and collectibles. Its original purpose was to draw on Dark Horse properties but expanded to include such collectibles as Tim Burton's Tragic Toys for Girls and Boys, Joss Whedon's Serenity, and merchandise for the popular video-game franchise Mass Effect. Dark Horse, working with Big Tent Entertainment and the NHK broadcasting corporation, brought Domo-kun to the United States with a series of products ranging from Qee figurines to journals and stationery sets. David Scroggy was Vice President of Product Development at Dark Horse for many years, starting in that department in 1993 and retiring in 2017.

=== Kitchen Sink Books ===
In 2013, Denis Kitchen and John Lind co-founded Kitchen Sink Books with Dark Horse as a joint venture and independent imprint. The imprint name is in reference to Kitchen's former publishing company Kitchen Sink Press which ran from 1970 until 1999. Kitchen said of the venture, "John and I have packaged books for a number of first-rank publishers, but we have long discussed the ideal house to enjoy maximum freedom and creativity," says Kitchen. "In longtime friend and publisher Mike Richardson and Dark Horse Comics, we found just that."

The imprint's output is infrequent, publishing two to three high-profile projects annually, with editorial focus on art books and deluxe format collections. Creators published under the Kitchen Sink line include Will Eisner, Frank Miller, Harvey Kurtzman, Tony DiTerlizzi and collections/anthology titles include work from Jack Davis, Will Elder, Art Spiegelman, S. Clay Wilson, Monte Beauchamp, Bob Powell, Justin Green, Trina Robbins, Harvey Pekar, Arnold Roth, and Al Jaffee.

=== Berger Books ===
Former executive editor of Vertigo Karen Berger established the Berger Books imprint at Dark Horse in 2017. Titles published under the imprint include Hungry Ghosts written by Joel Rose and Anthony Bourdain, Incognegro (previously published through Vertigo) and a prequel Incognegro: Renaissance both written by Mat Johnson, The Seeds written by Ann Nocenti, She Could Fly written by Christopher Cantwell, and LaGuardia written by Nnedi Okorafor.

=== Dark Horse Games ===
On June 2, 2021, Dark Horse Comics launched a Gaming and Digital Entertainment Division in partnership with AAA studios to bring many of its "older and lesser-established IPs" into the gaming market.

=== Secret Stash Press (2022–present) ===
In March 2022, it was announced that Dark Horse and filmmaker Kevin Smith would be teaming up to publish the books of Secret Stash Press, a new publishing line by Smith. The first two books of the line include Maskerade, written by Smith and Andy Mcelfresh and Quick Stops, written by Smith and set within the View Askewniverse.

=== Flux House ===
In April 2022, it was announced that Matt Kindt was launching his Flux House imprint through Dark Horse, starting with MIND MGMT: Bootleg and continuing with Hairball in April 2023.

=== Dogu Publishing (2022–present) ===
Stan Sakai moved his Usagi Yojimbo series to Dark Horse under his Dogu Publishing imprint in July 2022.

=== Albatross Funnybooks (2022–present) ===
It was announced in September 2022 that Eric Powell had brought his Albatross Funnybooks imprint to Dark Horse. This would include series such as The Goon, Hillbilly and Big Man Plans, as well as Brendon Small's Galaktikon and Rebecca Sugar's Pug Davis.

=== Tiny Onion Studios (2022–present) ===
In November 2022, it was announced that Dark Horse had partnered with James Tynion IV to release books of his Tiny Onion Studios. This will include original books and print versions of books previously available on Substack. The first of these books include Blue Book, written by Tynion and illustrated by Michael Avon Oeming, which began publication in February 2023, while The Oddly Pedestrian Life of Christopher Chaos began publication in June 2023, with Tynion creating the story, Tate Brombal writing, and art by Isaac Goodhart. Christopher Chaos was originally envisioned as a five-issue miniseries, but due to strong pre-order numbers it has now become an ongoing series.

=== Millarworld (2023–present) ===
In December 2023, it was revealed that Mark Millar had signed a deal with Dark Horse to become the new publisher of Millarworld titles. This includes reprints of previous titles and new series, with five brand-new series launching in 2024, one of them being Nemesis Rogues' Gallery with artist Valerio Giangiordano.

== Titles ==
Dark Horse Comics has acquired the rights to make comic book adaptations of many popular films, video games and series. Some of these include Aliens, Army of Darkness (before Dynamite Entertainment acquired the license), Indiana Jones, Predator, RoboCop, The Thing, Star Wars, The Terminator, Buffy the Vampire Slayer (and its spin-off, Angel), Planet of the Apes, Let Me In, Ninja Gaiden, Plants vs. Zombies, and Avatar: The Last Airbender.

In 2013 CCP Games announced that Dark Horse would be publishing a series of comic books based on stories collected from players of the MMORPG EVE Online. In 2014, Lucasfilm announced that, as of 2015, future Star Wars comics would be published by Lucasfilm's corporate sibling, Marvel Comics.

In 2017, Dark Horse Comics began publishing Critical Role: Vox Machina Origins based on the web series Critical Role. In 2019, Critical Role: Vox Machina Origins was Dark Horse's sixth-best-selling title with 19,000 copies sold. The eight volume prequel graphic novel series Critical Role: The Mighty Nein Origins was published by Dark Horse between 2021 and 2024. Brian Hibbs, in The Beat's analysis of 2022 comics sales, highlighted that The Mighty Nein Origins: Caleb Widogast was one of eight Dark Horse titles in the "Top 750" and that it was Dark Horse's 4th best selling title with 15,000 copies sold.

== Dark Horse Entertainment ==
Dark Horse's production studio arm, Dark Horse Entertainment, produces films and television shows based on Dark Horse Comics. Established by Richardson in 1992, Dark Horse Entertainment set up shop on the lot at Twentieth Century Fox through a first-look deal with Larry Gordon and Largo Entertainment. Dark Horse Entertainment has produced over two dozen films and television projects.

Dark Horse Entertainment's 2018 deal with Vanguard Visionary Associates was "intended to allow the company to fully finance development of properties already owned by the company, as well as acquire outside material for media adaptation. The partnership is intended to be a gateway for Dark Horse to bring its comic book library to new foreign markets, with a particular focus on China". In 2019, Dark Horse Entertainment set up a first-look deal with the streaming company Netflix. In August 2022, Netflix and Dark Horse renewed their first-look deal for film and TV.

=== Television ===
The following are TV projects based on Dark Horse comic books:

- Duckman (1994–1997, animated series)
- The Mask (1995–1997, animated series)
- Timecop (1997–1998)
- Fat Dog Mendoza (2000–2001, animated series)
- Big Guy and Rusty the Boy Robot (1999–2001, animated series)
- The B.P.R.D. Declassified (2004, special)
- The Amazing Screw-On Head (2006, animated pilot)
- Axe Cop (2013–2015, animated series)
- Dark Matter (2015–2017)
- The Umbrella Academy (2019–2024)
- The Rocketeer (2019–2020, animated series)
- Resident Alien (2021–2025)
- Samurai Rabbit: The Usagi Chronicles (2022–present, animated series)
- Iyanu: Child of Wonder (2025, animated series)
- Fear Agent (TBA)
- Grendel (TBA)
- Hungry Ghosts (TBA, animated series)
- Lady Danger (TBA, animated series)
- MIND MGMT (TBA)
- Minor Threats (TBA)
- She Could Fly (TBA)
- Sin City (TBA)
- Wyrd (TBA)

=== Television shows with graphic novels ===
- Avatar: The Last Airbender (2012–present)
- The Legend of Korra (2017–present)
- Mysticons (2018–2020)
- Trollhunters (2018)

=== Video games with graphic novels ===
- Ninja Gaiden (2014–present)
- Tomb Raider (2014–present)
- StarCraft (2018–2019)

=== Films ===
The following are feature films based on series from Dark Horse Comics:

Released projects

- Dr. Giggles (1992)
- The Mask (1994)
- Timecop (1994)
- Tank Girl (1995)
- Enemy (1996)
- Barb Wire (1996)
- Mystery Men (1999)
- Virus (1999)
- G-Men from Hell (2000)
- American Splendor (2003)
- Timecop 2: The Berlin Decision (2003, direct-to-video)
- Alien vs. Predator (2004)
- Hellboy (2004)
- Sin City (2005)
- Son of the Mask (2005)
- Hellboy: Sword of Storms (2006, animated, television)
- 300 (2007)
- Hellboy: Blood and Iron (2007, animated, television)
- Aliens vs. Predator: Requiem (2007)
- Hellboy II: The Golden Army (2008)
- R.I.P.D. (2013)
- Sin City: A Dame to Kill For (2014)
- 300: Rise of an Empire (2014)
- Polar (2019)
- Hellboy (2019)
- Chickenhare and the Hamster of Darkness (2022, animated)
- R.I.P.D. 2: Rise of the Damned (2022, direct-to-video)
- Hellboy: The Crooked Man (2024)
- Chickenhare and the Secret of the Groundhog (2025, animated)
- Bang! (TBA)
- Dept. H (TBA)
- Emily the Strange (TBA, animated)
- Lady Killer (TBA)
- Mystery Girl (TBA)
- Tank Girl reboot (TBA)
- The Black Kaiser (TBA)
- The Goon (TBA, animated)
