= Danger Unlimited =

Comic book series by John Byrne

- Cover to Danger Unlimited #1

Publication information
- Publisher: Dark Horse Comics
- Schedule: Monthly
- Format: Ongoing series
- Genre: Superhero
- Publication date: February – May 1994
- No. of issues: 4

Creative team
- Created by: John Byrne
- Written by: John Byrne
- Artist(s): John Byrne; Kieron Dwyer
- Letterer: John Byrne
- Colorist(s): Matt Webb; Kieron Dwyer
- Editor: Mike Richardson

Collected editions
- Limited Edition: ISBN 1-56971-111-9

Danger Unlimited is a comic book series written and drawn by John Byrne. It ran only four issues, with print publication dates of March to June 1994. The series was published by Dark Horse Comics.

== Publication history ==
From 1991 to 1994, John Byrne developed his own creator-owned titles at Dark Horse Comics under the Legend imprint, as did other artists and writers such as Mike Mignola, Arthur Adams and Frank Miller. In addition to Danger Unlimited, Byrne created Babe (1994), John Byrne's 2112 (1991), and John Byrne's Next Men (1992–1994) while with Dark Horse.

Danger Unlimited was intended as an ongoing series, but it ended abruptly after just four issues at Byrne's decision, due to less-than-anticipated sales brought on in part by the mid-1990s collapse of the American comic industry. Byrne himself provided insight into this collapse (or Wall Street-like "normalization") in the letter column to issue #4. Byrne had intended the series to capture a wider, younger audience with a lower cover price and no content that would require a "mature" warning. Low pre-sales and long lead times gave him less revenue, so he made the decision that it was unprofitable to continue work on the title.

Byrne says he has been misquoted about his intention for the title. He never said it was "the Fantastic Four done right." His self-described quote was, "Well, since nobody else is doing the Fantastic Four" — that is, an old-fashioned, adventure-based superhero series suitable for all ages — "I thought I would." That the book was not a copy of the earlier title is bolstered by the fact that while the "original" Danger Unlimited team had similar attributes to the Fantastic Four, the later team had different powers and backgrounds.

Each issue included an additional story featuring Torch of Liberty, an American superhero similar to Captain America. These stories were set during World War II in the European theater. Although no members of Danger Unlimited appeared, this had many connections within the same universe, including a cameo appearance by the Torch in one of the Danger Unlimited stories. The stories and characters were also created by Byrne.

== Plot ==
The only story arc of the series is called “Phoenix Agenda” and is set in 2060. The 20th century backstory is interwoven throughout the four books out of sequence via flashbacks.

In December 1959, the Carson family meets with famous explorer Mike Worley in South America to investigate an ancient, giant spaceship that had crashed in the Amazon jungle in the distant past. The ship's systems trap the four and expose them a mutagenic substance intended to give the ship's crew powers as warriors on whatever planet they visit. The substance would later be nicknamed, "Gunk." They escape after brief exposure to the Gunk, but it gives each of them superpowers which they use to fight for good as the original Danger Unlimited. The members include Miss Mirage (Connie Carson), who can project illusions. Her brother Thermal (Calvin Carson) can fly and project heat and cold. Their father, Doc Danger (Dr. Robert Carson), is a brilliant scientist who had his intellect augmented even more, continuing his mutation over the years with an increasingly enlarged cranium and atrophied limbs until he became nothing more than an enormous head by 1985, supported by a flying platform with robotic manipulator arms. And Hunk (Worley), who gains rough, stone-like, superhard skin and superstrength. Connie was immediately attracted to Mike and they would eventually marry. In 1985, the team engages in a final battle with Umbra, their nemesis. During Umbra's attack on the team's headquarters, Thermal is seriously injured and Doc Danger places him into a biological stasis chamber before turning to battle Umbra alone. Nobody knows what happened after that, but Doc Danger shuts down all systems and seals the headquarters in a force field with a time lock set to disengage in 75 years. The team was missing and presumed dead.

In 2060, the time lock releases the force field and the new Earth government moved in to demolish the headquarters. A sudden energy signature inside draws a military team to investigate. When they try to cut into the containment pod, Calvin's latent powers allow him to absorb the energy and burst free from the containment pod, after which he loses consciousness. A sample of Gunk was also stored inside the pod and explodes over Corporal Teresa LaFayette, a fan of Danger Unlimited. Both Calvin and Teresa are comatose for the next two weeks, Teresa as a giant, spiky, rocky humanoid. When they awake, Calvin has amnesia and no longer seems to have his powers after that first and only outburst. Teresa has reverted to human form. Professor Davis Palmenter, who was studying what happened to Teresa, realizes it was Gunk at work again and smashes the sample vial of it with his hand. He is split into three identical but independent clones who think in unison. Captain Brewster, Teresa's commanding officer and also a freedom sympathizer, explains to Calvin that an alien race called the Xlerii invaded Earth in 2010. All superhumans mysteriously vanished in 2011 during the ensuing Alien War. The ship that the Carsons investigated in 1959 was a Xlerii advance scout. After defeating the bulk of Earth's military forces, the Xlerii offered Earth a deal for peace and prosperity but in reality are taking over, altering the global environment to fit their needs. The Earth is now perpetually dark and shrouded by clouds, with almost constant rain. Discussion of the superhumans and their disappearance is forbidden under Xlerii rule.

Brewster gives Calvin a mnemonic stimulator to help him recall memories of his past life with Danger Unlimited.

As Teresa is introduced to Calvin, a Xlerii enforcer in battle armor attacks them in his hospital room. Teresa transforms and defeats the enforcer. The Xlerii try to excuse the attack as an automated response to Calvin's reappearance. They claim to have no role in the disappearance of Earth's superhumans and thus had never seen the need to remove them from their database as enemy combatants. Brewster is suspicious and arranges a police vehicle for Teresa and Calvin to leave the hospital. They're discovered and pursued but manage to escape.

Teresa and Calvin flee to her supercentenarian great-great-grandmother's house in Louisiana. The three Palmenter clones arrive, sent by Captain Brewster, and convinces them to become a new Danger Unlimited, with additional encouragement from Teresa's ancestor, who remembers the time before the Xlerii arrived and there was still sunlight in the sky. Teresa takes on the name "Belabet," based on her great-great-grandmother's Creole exclamation of "La belle et la bete" (Beauty and the Beast) upon seeing her transform. The Palmenters call themselves "Caucus." They plan to pursue two main missions: to drive the Xlerii from Earth and to find out what happened to all of the superheroes. Calvin would continue to try to regain his memories and discover the fate of his Danger Unlimited teammates.

== Additional background ==
Byrne eventually intended to reveal that the team's arch-enemy, Umbra, was actually Caroline Carson, the wife of Robert Carson (Doc Danger) who had perished in 1950 and been somehow resurrected and transformed afterward. This may explain why Doc Danger says as he readied himself to battle Umbra alone, "And, in the end, perhaps this was how it was always meant to be..." Umbra was never actually shown in any of the issues.

A previously unpublished page on John Byrne's website — finished, colored and lettered -- shows two unidentified characters sneaking through a top security Xlerii holding facility to find the corpse of Calvin Carson in a morgue-like drawer after finding out that Captain Brewster had previously inspected the drawer.

Four promotional pages published as the series premiered showed a battle between the original team (presumably circa 1970, as Doc Danger was still recognizably human but his cranium had visibly expanded in both height and girth) and aliens (not Xlerii, which is why Calvin did not know of Xlerii) aboard one of their spaceships.

Nazi supervillain Golgotha was a recurring adversary of the team, although he appeared only in one flashback. He appears to be a cyborg with a mechanical left arm and his head is a bare skull underneath a transparent dome. Golgotha was the arch-enemy of Torch of Liberty and Doc Danger mentions that he himself and Golgotha had come into conflict in 1944. He is mentioned in John Byrne's timeline of that universe as being fought and killed after World War II. He was resurrected in 1965, battled Danger Unlimited thereafter and later killed in battle by Calvin Carson after murdering Calvin's wife.

Ultroid is another villain mentioned in the timeline but not revealed within the series.

== Reception ==
Comic Book Resources felt that the comic "perfectly showcases the potential of The Fantastic Four", and noted that "a conquered future full of alien invaders (...) bring(s) the stars to the heroes instead of the opposite", which was "a good way to modernize the concept without getting caught in the milieu and iconography".

== Collected editions ==
The series has been collected into a single volume:

- Danger Unlimited (Dark Horse, softcover, April 1995, ISBN 1-56971-058-9; hardcover limited edition, August 2005, ISBN 1-56971-111-9, IDW Publishing, also includes Babe #1–4 and Babe 2 #1–2, 244 pages, softcover, March 2009, ISBN 1-60010-363-4)
