= Babe (comics) =

Comic book by artist/writer John Byrne

- Babe #1; Cover art by Gary Cody

Publication information
- Publisher: Dark Horse Comics
- Schedule: Monthly
- Format: Limited series
- Publication date: July – October 1994
- No. of issues: 4

Creative team
- Created by: John Byrne
- Written by: John Byrne
- Artist: John Byrne
- Colorist: Matt Webb
- Editor(s): Barbara Kesel; Bob Schreck

Collected editions
- Danger Unlimited: ISBN 1-60010-363-4

Babe was a four-issue comic book mini-series published by American company Dark Horse Comics under their Legend imprint, from July 1994 to October 1994. It was written by John Byrne, with pencils and inks by Byrne, and covers by Gary Cody.

Babe was set in the same universe as Hellboy, The Torch of Liberty, Monkeyman and O'Brien and Danger Unlimited.

== Plot ==
In the first issue, Babe, a super-strong woman, appears to Ralph Rowan, with no memory of where she came from, how she ended up on the beach, where her power comes from, or why nothing hurts her. In issues #2 and #3, she is snatched up by aliens, and teams up with guest The Blonde Bombshell (former partner of Torch of Liberty). After escaping the alien spacecraft in issue #3, Babe and company come back to Earth along with the survivors of a mysterious plane crash, who have some strange connection to Babe. Issue #3 also features the first appearance of John Byrne's creations the Prototykes. Babe's origin is finally revealed in issue #4, which features the Prototykes again, and Babe's final showdown with villain Gideon Longshadow.

A 2-issue mini-series titled Babe 2 followed in 1995. Babe 2 finds Babe battling the Shrewmanoid, and also features a guest appearance by Abe Sapien.

== Collected editions ==
The series has been collected into a trade paperback bringing together all the stories set in the Danger Unlimited universe:

- Danger Unlimited (collects Babe #1–4 and Babe 2 #1–2, also includes Danger Unlimited #1–4, IDW Publishing, 244 pages, softcover, March 2009, ISBN 1-60010-363-4)
