= Monkeyman and O'Brien =

American comic book series

- Monkeyman and O'Brien #1 (July 1996)

Publication information
- Publisher: Dark Horse Comics
- Main character(s): Axwell Tiberius; Ann O'Brien

Creative team
- Created by: Arthur Adams

Collected editions
- Monkeyman and O'Brien: ISBN 1569712328

Monkeyman and O'Brien is an American science fiction creator-owned comics series created by artist Arthur Adams in 1993, which follows the adventures of Ann O'Brien, the daughter of a missing scientist, and Axwell Tiberius (the titular "Monkeyman"), a 10-foot-tall (3.0 m) super-intelligent gorilla-like being from another dimension.

The series was published from 1993 to 1999 by Dark Horse Comics in various formats including short features in anthologies, backup stories in other series, a three issue limited series, a two-issue crossover series, and a comic strip in the promotional newspaper Dark Horse Extra.

In 1997, a trade paperback collection of four issues (a special collecting the four-part origin story and the three-issue limited series) was published.

== Development ==
Writer/artist Art Adams, who conceived of Monkeyman & O'Brien as series that would enable him to draw monsters similar to the classic movie monsters that he enjoyed in his youth, like Godzilla, King Kong and the Universal Monsters. The series stars Ann O'Brien, the daughter of a missing scientist whom Adams named in tribute to Fay Wray's character, Ann Darrow, from King Kong and that film's special effects creator Willis O'Brien; and Axwell Tiberius (dubbed "Monkeyman" by O'Brien), a 10-foot-tall (3.0 m) super-intelligent gorilla-like being that Adams conceived as "the Reed Richards of the gorilla world".

== Publication history ==
The series debuted in Dark Horse Presents #80 (December 1993) in a story titled "A Monkeyman & O'Brien Adventure: Tortorus". The characters' origins were shown in the four-part series "Who Are Monkeyman and O'Brien?", published as backups in Mike Mignola's 1994 series Hellboy: Seed of Destruction and later republished in a single issue. The series continued in several short stories in Dark Horse Presents (#100–5; #118–119), a three-issue limited series titled Monkeyman and O'Brien (1996), and a 1998 crossover miniseries Gen^{13}/Monkeyman and O'Brien (published by Image Comics). The characters' last published appearance was in 1999 in a comic strip in Dark Horse Extra, a newspaper-style comics fanzine.

== Plot ==
When the series opens, one of the experimental machines in O'Brien's lab is accidentally activated by Ann, teleporting Tiberius from another dimension. The same accident also bathes Ann in a mysterious radiation which caused her grow to seven feet tall and endowed her with superhuman strength, endurance and speed. Axwell quickly became Ann's friend and the two went on to face numerous Silver Age–style threats including the "Shrewmanoid" and the "Froglodytes". The duo also encountered the Image Comics super-team Gen^{13}. In the last Monkeyman and O'Brien stories published to date, humorous situations arise between the pair such as O'Brien growing to colossal size after being hit by one of Monkeyman's experimental devices. Monkeyman's brother Nonny O'Brien also features in the series.

=== Villains ===
- Akiko Oki, O'Brien's friend and assistant. She shares the vast O'Brien estate, sets up appointments, and takes on any non-science- or law-related task that O'Brien assigns. Before the arrival of Tiberius she was O'Brien's closest companion, regularly joining her for workouts or sharing new clothes.
- Shrewmanoid, a mysterious handyman and lumberjack who encountered alien technology that transformed him into a giant, anthropomorphic shrew. The transformation left the Shrewmanoid with all of his intelligence, albeit deranged, and he moved swiftly to become a supervillain. He can command subterranean monsters to do his bidding but has exhibited no other special powers. The Shrewmanoid is convinced that he is a supremely evolved being: Indeed, he believed this even before his transformation. After he saw news reports of a San Francisco scientist transforming into a seven-foot-tall superhero he led an army of monsters to San Francisco to capture her. He failed and was sucked into another dimension, "The Negative Zone," where he fended for himself until Monkeyman and O'Brien arrived there on an exploratory mission. They rescued him in order to imprison him on Earth, but after the Shrewmanoid professed his love for O'Brien and she rejected him, he bit her and escaped. In John Byrne's 1995 Babe 2, set after the events of Monkeyman and O'Brien, he reappeared in an unsuccessful attempt to capture the titular amazonian hero.
- Froglodytes (First appearance: Monkeyman and O'Brien #2 [1996]), a race of world-conquering, intelligent frogs. One of their ships was plotting an attack on Earth and scouring the planet for threats when they found Axwell Tiberius. They teleported him into their custody, but O'Brien arrived with him and the two of them sabotaged the Froglodytes' plan. As O'Brien distracted the creatures and mangled their control room, Tiberius sent a false alarm to the rest of the fleet, convincing them that the Earth was already under attack from giant insects. The Froglodytes fled after that message.

== Unproduced adaptation ==
On January 1, 2000, it was revealed that producer Jeff Kline was awaiting a pick-up order from the Fox Kids Network for a cel-animated Monkeyman and O'Brien series. While the production had gotten as far as scripting (with significant input from creator Art Adams), the show was ultimately never produced.
