= Spider-Man: Chapter One =

American comic book miniseries

- Cover to Spider-Man: Chapter One #1, art by John Byrne. This image is a homage to Jack Kirby and Steve Ditko's August 1962 cover for Amazing Fantasy #15, which was the first appearance of Spider-Man.

Publication information
- Publisher: Marvel Comics
- Schedule: Monthly
- Format: Miniseries
- Genre: Superhero
- Publication date: December 1998 – October 1999
- No. of issues: 13 (#1–6, #0, and #7–12)
- Main character: Spider-Man

Creative team
- Written by: John Byrne
- Artist(s): John Byrne; Al Milgrom (#10 and #12)
- Letterer: John Byrne
- Colorist(s): John Kalisz (#1–2); Joe Andreani (#3); Steve Buccellato (#4–5); Christie Scheele (#6–7); Mark McNabb (#8–10); Mark Bernardo (#9–10); Joe Rosas (#11–12)
- Editor: Ralph Macchio

Spider-Man: Chapter One is an American comic book miniseries starring Spider-Man published by Marvel Comics for 13 issues (#1–12, with a #0 issue (April 1999) added between issues #6 (April 1999) and 7 (May 1999) from December 1998 to October 1999. The entire miniseries was written and illustrated by John Byrne. This storyline is designated as taking place on Earth-98121 in the Marvel multiverse and is not part of the mainstream Marvel Universe of Earth-616.

== Issues involved ==
Spider-Man: Chapter One #1–6, 0 and 7–12 (December 1998–October 1999) was a modern-day adaptation of many, but not all, of these particular issues that chronicled the early days of Spider-Man's superhero career:

- Amazing Fantasy #15 (August 1962) and, years later {real time), #16–18 (December 1995–March 1996);
- The Amazing Spider-Man #1–15 (March, May, July and September–December 1963 and January–August 1964);
- The Amazing Spider-Man Annual #1 (1964);
- The Amazing Spider-Man #16–20 (September–December 1964 and January 1965).

== Reception ==
The miniseries was a modest success. Some comic book fans objected to Byrne's perceived tampering with the classic Spider-Man stories produced by his creators Stan Lee and Steve Ditko and complained that the original 1960s stories did not require any updating at all. The editorial intention of the miniseries, however, was to be a re-telling of the character's early stories that was designed to attract new readers. Byrne would soon be drawing the relaunch of The Amazing Spider-Man title with writer Howard Mackie.

Spider-Man: Chapter One, though not a sales record-breaker (possibly because it was sold only through the comic book direct market, which limited its exposure to potential new readers), finished out its run as planned, even adding a #0 issue (April 1999) between issues #6 (April 1999) and 7 (May 1999). On that basis, Byrne was later asked to do a second miniseries to be called Spider-Man: Chapter Two, but turned down the offer.

Since Byrne left the Spider-Man titles, his successors have shied away from making any references to the miniseries, and according to Official Index to the Marvel Universe #1–14 (January 2009–February 2010), it is now Marvel's stance that the original stories have regained their canonical status.

Spider-Man: Chapter One also brought controversy over the former ongoing series Untold Tales of Spider-Man (#1–25 (September 1995–October 1997); also including two Annuals (Annual '96 and Annual '97), a #–1 issue (July 1997) that occurred between issues #22 (June 1997) and 23 (August 1997), a one-shot issue called Untold Tales of Spider-Man: Strange Encounter (February 1999) and stories in Amazing Fantasy #16–18 (December 1995–March 1996 (which preceded the series)) and The Amazing Spider-Man Annual #37 (2010 (which ended it))), where all the stories presented therein were brand-new stories also set in the early days of Spider-Man's superhero career, but taking place in-between the original stories by Lee and Ditko. The non-canonical Spider-Man: Chapter One ignores the canonical continuity of Untold Tales of Spider-Man entirely.

== Similar versions ==
Spider-Man's early adventures would be retold, again with a modern twist, in Ultimate Spider-Man, an ongoing series that Marvel launched in October 2000 and that lasted until June 2011. This series sidestepped the canonical/non-canonical continuity question by setting its stories in an entirely new alternate universe Earth-1610.

Another modern re-telling of the early Spider-Man stories came in 2004 with the launch of Marvel Age Spider-Man #1–20 (May 2004–March 2005), later relaunched as Marvel Adventures Spider-Man #1–61 (May 2005–May 2010). These two series, which were each aimed at young readers, also retold many of Lee and Ditko's original stories in all 20 issues of the Marvel Age Spider-Man series and the first three of the 61 issues of the Marvel Adventures Spider-Man series (as Spider-Man: Chapter One did), although both of the contemporary-set series were clearly meant to take place outside of the mainstream Marvel Universe continuity.

== Collected editions ==
A trade paperback collecting the entire miniseries was published in January 2012 (ISBN 0-7851-5848-0). It was also included in Spider-Man by John Byrne, a Marvel Omnibus published in September 2019 (ISBN 1-302-91952-0).

== Legacy ==
A few of the supervillains' costumes from the miniseries were later briefly used for their mainstream Marvel Universe counterparts in a two-part story called "Another Return of the Sinister Six", which was chronicled in The Amazing Spider-Man (vol. 2) #12 (December 1999) and Peter Parker: Spider-Man (vol. 2) #12 (December 1999).

=== Hulk: Chapter One ===
In Hulk Annual 1999, Byrne revised the Hulk's origin, similar to what was done in Spider-Man: Chapter One. In this revised origin, the gamma bomb that was being tested was now a gamma laser, and a Skrull was responsible for Rick Jones' presence on the base during the test. The contemporary setting removed the Cold War context of the original story and served as a tie-in issue to the miniseries Marvel: The Lost Generation (March 2000–February 2001), created by Byrne and Roger Stern.

This storyline (which includes Hulk Annual 1999 and Marvel: The Lost Generation) is designated as being set in Earth-9992 in the Marvel multiverse.

== See also ==
- The Man of Steel, a 1986 comic book limited series featuring the DC Comics character Superman also written and drawn by John Byrne that told the story of Superman's modern origin.
