= Doomsday + 1 =

American comic book series

- Doomsday + 1 #5 (March 1976). Left to right: Kuno, Ellis, Yashida, Malden. Cover art by John Byrne.

Publication information
- Publisher: Charlton Comics
- Schedule: Bimonthly
- Format: Ongoing series
- Publication date: July 1975 – May 1977
- No. of issues: 12

Creative team
- Written by: Joe Gill
- Artist: John Byrne

Doomsday + 1 is an American post-apocalyptic comic-book series that was published by Charlton Comics in the 1970s.

It is best known as the first original, color-comics series by artist John Byrne, who would go on to become a major industry figure. Byrne had previously drawn three unrelated, anthological short stories for comics, as well as the first three issues of a Saturday-morning cartoon licensed comic book before co-creating this original series.

== Publication history ==
Doomsday + 1 originally ran six issues, cover-dated July 1975 – May 1976. Two years after its cancelation it was revived as an all-reprint series with issues #7–12 (June 1978 – May 1979), reprinting the contents of the first six issues.

The series was created by writer Joe Gill and penciler-inker John Byrne for the small, Derby, Connecticut-based publisher Charlton Comics, under editor George Wildman. Byrne, who also served as letterer, used the pseudonym "Byrne Robotics" for issue #4–6 (reprinted as #10–12). The credits for issue #5 credit the artwork as "Art: Byrne Robotics with technical assistance from Patterson-75", a pseudonym for Bruce Patterson, who provided some degree of inking.

Byrne drew the covers of issues #2–6, with the cover of issue #1 variously credited to Byrne and to Tom Sutton. Issues #7 and #11 featured re-colored reprints of Byrne covers, while issues #8–10 and #12 featured "new" covers created by blowing up panels of interior artwork from the stories.

Stories ran 22 to 23 pages, with most issues also containing a two-page text backup – either a story featuring the main characters or a non-fiction featurette. The backup in issue #5 consisted of two comics pages, drawn by Steve Ditko, of "real world" paranormal vignettes.

One additional 22-page story was produced by Gill and Byrne, but was not published in the original series. It appeared in two parts titled "There Will Be Time, Part One: Time-Slip" and "Part Two: The Man from Elsewhen" in publisher CPL/Gang Publications' Charlton-sponsored comic-book/fanzine hybrid Charlton Bullseye #4–5 (April & Sept. 1976).

Sales of the 1978–79 reprint issues began strong, and editor Wildman assigned Tom Sutton to write and draw a 15-page story scheduled to run as issue #13. As sales of the reprint series tapered off, the project was canceled. While the script became lost, Sutton's pencil-and-ink art for the story, "The Secret City", eventually surfaced, with the cover and the first page published in the magazine Charlton Spotlight #6 (Fall 2008). Although the script was lost and Sutton had passed, the dialogue was recreated by Nicola Cuti and saw publication in Charlton Spotlight #8

== Later reprints ==
All six original stories plus the two-part Charlton Bullseye story were reprinted as the Fantagraphics comic-book series The Doomsday Squad #1–7 (Aug. 1986 – June 1987), with new covers by Byrne (#1–2), Neal Adams (#4), and Gil Kane (the remainder). This series included a new backup feature each issue, including "Dalgoda" by writer Jan Strnad and artist Dennis Fujitake, "Keif Llama" by writer-artist Matt Howarth, and "Captain Jack" by writer Mike Kazaleh and artist Marc Schirmeister.

== Plot ==
The series takes place in a near future in which a South American despot named Rykos launches his sole two atomic missiles on New York City in the U.S. and Moscow in the U.S.S.R. The two superpowers, each believing the other has launched a first strike, retaliate. By the time American president Cole and a Russian premier with the first name Mikhail have realized their errors, their fully automated nuclear-missile systems can not be countermanded.

Only hours before the apocalypse begins, a Saturn VI rocket launches bearing three astronauts: Captain Boyd Ellis, United States Air Force; his fiancée, Jill Malden; and Japanese physicist Ikei Yashida. Weeks later, after the post-apocalyptic radiation has subsided to safe levels, their space capsule lands upon a melting Greenland ice field, where the three ally themselves with Kuno, a 3rd-century Goth revived from his ice-encased suspended animation.

The four encounter a Russian scientist/cyborg in Canada, where they commandeer a futuristic jet plane; undersea dwellers; and brutish U.S. military survivors, among others.
