= FX (comics) =

American limited series of superhero comic books

- Cover for issue #1

Publication information
- Publisher: IDW Publishing
- Schedule: Monthly
- Format: Limited series
- Genre: Superhero
- Publication date: March – August 2008
- No. of issues: 6

Creative team
- Written by: Wayne Osborne
- Artist: John Byrne
- Letterer: John Workman
- Colorist: Greg Cordier

Collected editions
- FX: ISBN 1-60010-274-3

FX is a six-issue comic book limited series written and created by Wayne Osborne and drawn by John Byrne. It was published by IDW Publishing in 2008. Osborne, a lifelong comics fan, realized his dream by hiring Byrne, a prominent professional comics artist, to help create his own comic book title.

== Publication history ==
FX was created by writer Wayne Osborne, who commissioned artist John Byrne to draw it. John Byrne made it known on his message board that he was open to full-comic commissions, at a cost of $20,000 an issue. Osborne hired Byrne; this was Osborne's first comic book. The production was done using the Marvel Method where the story is plotted, the art is drawn and then the script finalised because, as Byrne says, "that eliminated about 90% of the mistakes newbie writers make."

A follow-up series, FX: The Lost Land, was released as a graphic novel in December 2010 with art by Uko Smith.

== Premise ==
Tom Talbot, a teenage boy, gains superhuman powers after being struck down by a mysterious accident. However, his powers are mostly limited by his imagination (making special effects a reality) and he decides to become a superhero by the name of FX, while fighting his enemy Silverback.

== Issues ==
1. "Monkey Business" (March 2008)
2. "Things That Go... CRASH ...in the Night" (April 2008)
3. "We've Got Spirits... Yes, We Do!" (May 2008)
4. "Weird Science" (June 2008)
5. "Myth-Understandings" (July 2008)
6. "Full Circle" (August 2008)

== Other editions ==
The series has been collected as a trade paperback:

- FX (152 pages, November 2008, ISBN 1-60010-274-3)
