= Gen13/Monkeyman and O'Brien =

Comic book miniseries

Gen^{13}/Monkeyman and O'Brien
- Gen^{13}/Monkeyman and O'Brien #1

Publication information
- Publisher: Image Comics
- Format: Limited series
- Publication date: June – August 1998
- No. of issues: 2

Creative team
- Written by: Arthur Adams
- Penciller: Arthur Adams
- Inker: Sandra Hope
- Letterer: Amie Grenier
- Colorist(s): Laura Depuy (issue #1); Matt Milla & Wildstorm FX
- Editor: Scott Dunbier

Gen^{13}/Monkeyman and O'Brien is a two-issue comic book miniseries published by Image Comics in 1998. It serves as a crossover between Art Adams's creator-owned Monkeyman and O'Brien and WildStorm's Gen^{13}.

The story is an homage to the Star Trek episode "Mirror, Mirror", with a transporter incident swapping many of the titular cast members with their evil counterparts from an alternate universe.
