= Next Men =

American comic book series by John Byrne

- John Byrne's Next Men #1 (January 1992)

Publication information
- Publisher: Dark Horse Comics; IDW Publishing
- Publication date: Vol. 1: January 1992–December 1994; Vol. 2: December 2010–August 2011; Next Men: Aftermath: February 2012–June 2012
- No. of issues: Vol. 1: 31 (#0–30); Vol. 2: 9 Next Men: Aftermath: 5

Creative team
- Written by: John Byrne
- Artist: John Byrne

John Byrne's Next Men (also known as Next Men or JBNM) is an American comic book series written and drawn by John Byrne. The first volume of the series was published by Dark Horse Comics between 1991 and 1995. A nine-issue miniseries was published by IDW Publishing in 2010 and 2011, followed by another series titled Next Men: Aftermath in 2012.

== Publication history ==
The Next Men characters made a prototypical appearance as "Freaks" in a lithography plate that was published within the History of the DC Universe Portfolio in 1986. Byrne had originally pitched the series to DC Comics, but the series never surfaced there. With some changes, Byrne changed the concept to fit in with his work on the graphic novel 2112, to become the John Byrne's Next Men series. Two characters from the "Freaks" artwork somewhat retained their physical looks and became the lead characters of the Next Men series: heroine Jasmine (aka "Jazz") and villain Aldus Hilltop.

The Next Men officially debuted in a four–part storyline in Dark Horse Presents #54–57 (Sept.–Dec. 1991), later reprinted, in color, as John Byrne's Next Men #0 (Feb. 1992). The series ran until issue #30 (Dec. 1994) and ended with a cliffhanger. According to Byrne, he intended the series to be science-fiction that had a "sort of smell" of being a super-hero book. In addition to exploring mature topics such as sex, abortion, and child abuse, Byrne also set aside some of the more-traditional conventions of the medium, such as "thought-bubbles" and sound-effects.

Byrne had intended to conclude the story in a second series after a six-month hiatus, but the financial weakness of the American comic-book industry in the mid-1990s made it financially unfeasible for him to do so, and he returned to working for hire at DC Comics and Marvel Comics.

On October 12, 2007, Byrne announced on his website that comic publisher IDW would release black and white "phonebook"-sized reprints of the Next Men series sometime in 2008, with the first collection released in May 2008. He stated on his message board:

All the Next Men stuff will be coming from IDW in big, honkin' black and white 'phonebooks' in the New Year. Don't have a more precise schedule than that, but when I know, you'll know.”

In an interview with IDW appearing in the publisher's April 2008 comic books, when asked about the possibility of a new Next Men series, Byrne answered,

If it looks like Next Men can be done as something other than a vanity project, I will certainly do it. The series has a definite ending--I even know the last line!--and I would very much like to shake those 20 or so issues out of my head someday!"

At the 2010 San Diego Comic-Con, Byrne revealed that he was creating new issues of JBNM to be published by IDW Publishing. Byrne said that the new series would be both a continuation of the previous series as well as a place for new readers to discover the characters. He expected the entire story, previous series plus new series, to run about 50 issues. IDW's John Byrne's Next Men #1 was released on December 15, 2010.

It was announced in February 2011 that Byrne would finish the Next Men series with issue #9 of the 2010–2011 series, but a sequel titled Next Men: Aftermath immediately followed.

== Synopsis ==
=== First series (Dark Horse, 1991–1995) ===
In 1955, an explosion in Antarctica draws the attention of a group of scientists. There they discover dozens of charred bodies, some of which do not appear to be human. Among them is a creature in a mechanical exoskeleton, named Sathanas, who kills all but one of the scientists, whom Sathanas uses to meet Senator Aldus Hilltop. Together, with Sathanas' existence kept secret, the three construct "Project Next Men", whose goal is to create superhumans. The project used babies who were given up for adoption by single mothers. Due to Hilltop's racial concerns, all of the mothers were white. The children were experimented on and grew to maturity in a lab while in their minds they experienced an idyllic virtual-reality world.

Eventually five of these "Next Men" manage to escape from confinement, but once free, they find that their powers are very greatly enhanced from how they were in their virtual world. The Next Men are:

- Nathan, whose mutated eyes allow him to see a wide spectrum of light. Team leader.
- Jasmine, a young super-acrobat. Nathan nicknames her "Jazz".
- Jack, who is super-strong but cannot control his strength.
- Bethany, who is invulnerable to harm to the point of having razor-sharp hair, but who loses physical sensation and whose skin bleaches white.
- Danny, who can run at superhuman speeds.

After escaping from the Project, the Next Men have a number of interactions with outsiders, including a previous escapee who is deformed. Eventually, they are taken in by a US government agent, Tony Murcheson, who works for an individual known as Control. Murcheson works as their handler from that point in the series, intervening when she can and offering a reality check to her naive charges. During their first official mission in Russia, the Next Men are captured. Jasmine, afraid they will be killed, seeks solace in the arms of teammate Nathan, and the two unknowingly conceive a child. Meanwhile, Danny, the youngest member of the team who was not allowed to go on the mission, goes on a quest to find his birth mother. Reunited with her, she reveals the identity of his father: Aldus Hilltop. Afterward, his new half-sister convinces Danny to take her away from their abusive mother. The two run off to New York City, where Danny hopes to meet his hero, the fictional comic-book character, Action Maxx. He finds instead the character's publisher, who decides to exploit Danny and the other Next Men for a new comic-book series, once Danny convinces him that his claim of having superpowers is real. This brings the Next Men to the attention of law-enforcement authorities investigating the damage left in the wake of the Next Men's escape from the Project. After a publicity stunt for their upcoming comic book, the Next Men are arrested, tried and convicted on multiple counts of murder. Before they can be sent to prison, Murcheson helps the Next Men escape, and the team lives for a time in a subterranean community of the homeless and disenfranchised.

During his time at the comic-book publisher, Danny is befriended by a young woman named Sandy who is in charge of babysitting him. The two eventually have sex, and the woman goes on to develop reality-altering powers. These powers cause her to go crazy and attempt to remake the island of Manhattan. Once she is stopped by the Next Men, it is discovered that the powers which they have are sexually contagious; anyone who has sex with one of the Next Men will develop their own superhuman abilities.

As the series progresses, Sathanas continues to influence Senator Hilltop, who becomes Vice President and then President, and attempts to manipulate the Next Men for his own ends. As part of this effort, he brainwashes Jasmine into believing that she is his wife and that her time with the Next Men was merely an involved dream. Towards the end of the series, Hilltop has sex with Jasmine and develops powers similar to Sathanas, leading him to realize that Sathanas is in fact a future version of himself in an example of a predestination paradox.

In issue #7, a backup story, "M4" (Mark IV) started. It dealt with an android, Mark IV, or "Mark Ivey" as one character called him. Initially appearing as a separate storyline, eventually the series started to tie into the Next Men storyline, and finally merged with it in issue #23.

=== Second series (IDW, 2010–2011) ===
The 2011 miniseries (which Byrne labels with a "3" in superscript beside each issue number, to continue the numbering of the original series) expands on the time-travel and alternate-reality plots from the initial series, picking up from the cliffhanger ending by stranding each teammate and Agent Murcheson in divergent time periods. Nathan ends up stranded in Nazi Germany and is experimented on by a Nazi scientist. Jasmine is stranded in Elizabethan era England, and succumbs to the Plague. Murcheson is stranded in the South during the American Civil War and is forced into slavery; she later escapes and uses her knowledge of the past to prevent the assassination of Abraham Lincoln. Bethany is stranded in a futuristic setting by an unknown captor, who claims to be punishing her friends for having betrayed her.

It is later revealed that Bethany's captor is Bethany herself, who came from a future alternate timeline where an accident left her buried alive for over 200 years and drove her insane. Having been retrieved by scientists who mastered control over time, she ended up travelling to the past and kidnapped her former friends to scatter them throughout time. Soon, the scientists who retrieved Bethany arrive to stop her. They then retrieve Jasmine and Nathan, and one of the scientists, Gil, reveals to them his intention to send them back in time one last time to prevent Sathanas from arriving in 1955 (thereby undoing the events of the original Next Men series).

Jasmine, who has second thoughts about the mission, backs out, leaving Nathan and Bethany to go alone. Having successfully arrived in 1955, Bethany explodes a bomb which prevents the arrival of Sathanas and his mutates.

A sequel series, titled Next Men: Aftermath, by Byrne was published by IDW after the conclusion of the Next Men series proper. The sequel continued the numbering from the original series, starting with #40 and concluding with #44.

== Collections ==
JBNM was initially collected as a set of graphic novels published by Dark Horse Comics. These collections are in color, but do not include the early "M4" stories that were separate from the main storyline.

- 2112 (published in both prestige format and limited edition hardcover)
- Book One (reprints issues #0–6, published in both hardcover and trade paperback)
- Parallels (reprints issues #7–12)
- Fame (reprints issues #13–18)
- Faith (reprints issues #19–22)
- Power (reprints issues #23–26)
- Lies (reprints issues #27–30)

JBNM has also been collected three times by IDW Publishing. The "Compleat" volumes are black-and-white paperbacks, and include 2112 and the "M4" stories; the "Premiere" volumes are color hardbacks and include the "M4" stories but not 2112; the "Classic" volumes are color paperbacks, and include 2112 and the "M4" stories.

- John Byrne's Compleat Next Men, Volume 1, ISBN 1600101739 (May 2008) reprints 2112 and issues #0–12, including the first five "M4" stories.
- John Byrne's Compleat Next Men, Volume 2, ISBN 1600102727 (November 2008) reprints issues #13–30, including the "M4" backup stories.
- John Byrne's Next Men: The Premiere Collection, Vol. 1, ISBN 1600103650 (March 2009) reprints issues #0–10.
- John Byrne's Next Men: The Premiere Collection, Vol. 2, ISBN 1600105491 (December 2009) reprints issues #11–20.
- John Byrne's Next Men: The Premiere Collection, Vol. 3, ISBN 160010696X (July 2010) reprints issues #21–30.
- John Byrne's Classic Next Men, Vol. 1, ISBN 9781600109713 (July 2011) reprints 2112 and issues #0–6.
- John Byrne's Classic Next Men, Vol. 2, ISBN 9781613770832 (November 2011) reprints issues #7–18 and all of the "M4" backup stories.
- John Byrne's Classic Next Men, Vol. 3, ISBN 9781613771600 (March 2012) reprints issues #19–30 and all of the "M4" backup stories.

The IDW series has been collected in:

- John Byrne's Next Men Vol. 1: Scattered (reprints issues #1–4).
- John Byrne's Next Men Vol. 2: Scattered, Part 2 (reprints issues #5–9)
- John Byrne's Next Men Vol. 3: Aftermath (reprints issues #40–44, numbered to include the Dark Horse issues as well as the issues of "Scattered")
