= Arthur Adams (illustrator) =

American comic book artist

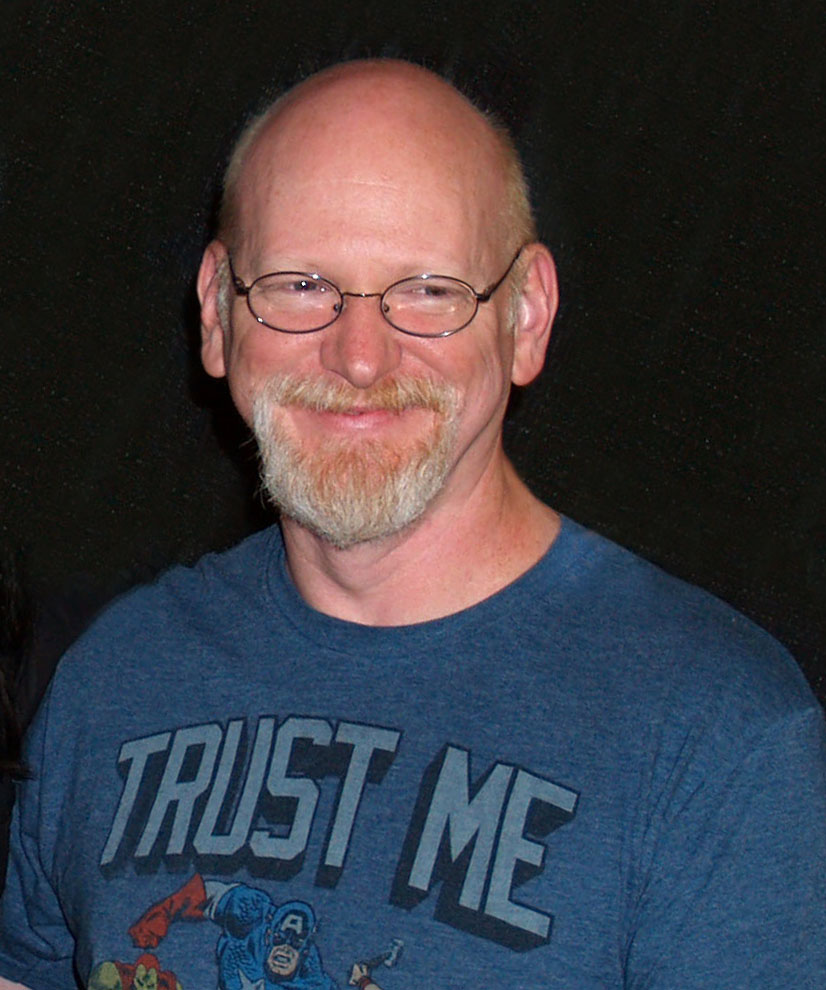
- Adams at the 2015 East Coast Comicon
- Born: April 5, 1963 (age 63) Holyoke, Massachusetts, U.S.
- Areas: Writer, Penciller, Inker
- Notable works: Longshot, The Uncanny X-Men, Monkeyman and O'Brien
- Awards: Russ Manning Award; 1986 Longshot; Eisner Award for Best Single Issue/One-Shot; 1988 Gumby Summer Fun Special

Arthur Adams (born April 5, 1963) is an American comic book artist and writer. He first broke into the American comic book industry with the 1985 Marvel Comics miniseries Longshot. His subsequent interior comics work includes a number of Marvel's major books, including The Uncanny X-Men, Excalibur, X-Factor, Fantastic Four, Hulk, and Ultimate Comics: X, as well as books by various other publishers, such as Action Comics, Vampirella, The Rocketeer, and The Authority. Adams has also illustrated books featuring characters for which he has a personal love, such as Godzilla, the Creature from the Black Lagoon, and Gumby, the latter of which garnered him a 1988 Eisner Award for Best Single Issue.

In 1994, Adams joined a group of creators that included Frank Miller, John Byrne, and Mike Mignola to form Legend, an imprint of creator-owned comics published by Dark Horse Comics, through which Adams published Monkeyman and O'Brien, a science fiction adventure series featuring archetypal sci-fi monsters that Adams wrote and illustrated. Although the Legend imprint ceased in 1998, Monkeyman and O'Brien continued to appear in print, sometimes in crossover stories with other comics characters, such as Gen^{13}/Monkeyman and O'Brien (1998), and Savage Dragon #41 (September 1997).

Because of his reputedly tight, labor-intensive penciling style, which was initially influenced by Michael Golden and Walter Simonson, and his admittedly slow pace, Adams mostly does cover work. When he does do interior art, it is usually for short storylines, one-shots, miniseries or contributions to anthologies, such as his 2002–2004 work on "Jonni Future", a pulp science fiction series he co-created with Steve Moore for the Wildstorm Productions anthology Tom Strong's Terrific Tales, and his 2008 work on Hulk (Vol 2) #7 - 9. His other cover work includes books such as Avengers Classic, Wonder Woman, and JLA, as well as pinups and other spot illustrations for books such as Sin City, The Official Handbook of the Marvel Universe and his own published sketchbook series, Arthur Adams Sketchbook. He has done design work for toys and video games, and miniature busts have been produced based on his renditions of notable characters. In the early 2000s he was commissioned to create artwork for the drum kit used by System of a Down drummer John Dolmayan.

He is one of the most popular and widely imitated artists in the comics industry, whose drawing style has been credited as an influence upon artists such as Joe Madureira and Ed McGuinness, as well as the artists associated with the founding and early days of Image Comics, such as J. Scott Campbell.

In October 2024, Adams was inducted into the Harvey Awards Hall of Fame.

== Early life ==
Arthur Adams was born on April 5, 1963 in Holyoke, Massachusetts, though his family moved from there when he was a year old, and thus he has no memory of that town. His father was a loadmaster in the United States Air Force, and as a result, Adams frequently moved with his parents and four younger brothers to places that included West Virginia. When Adams was five years old, the family settled in Vacaville, California, near Travis Air Force Base. Adams' first exposure to superhero and monster comics came through the ones his mother would buy for him once a month at a thrift store. His enthusiasm for superhero stories by particular creators began when his father returned from an overseas trip with the first Marvel Treasury Grab-Bag, which included stories by Ross Andru, Wally Wood, and Gene Colan. He particularly enjoyed Marvel Comics for their stories with monster-like characters such as the Thing, the Hulk, and the Man-Thing. He became interested in dinosaurs and monsters like King Kong after watching Creature Features on TV every Saturday, and Universal Monster movies such as Frankenstein and Creature from the Black Lagoon. He also enjoyed superhero and science fiction programming, such as Super Friends, the 1967 Spider-Man cartoon, and Star Trek. Adams enjoyed drawing frequently in his youth, as far back as he could remember. He discovered the work of Frank Frazetta when he was 13 or 14, and attempted to mimic his style using watercolor. Adams did not consider illustration as a profession, however, as he aspired to be a paleontologist. His interest in professional paleontology waned, however, when he realized that the extreme climates of the environments in which he would be required to work were not appealing to him.

Adams' desire to draw comics professionally was cemented in high school, when he bought Marvel Comics' Micronauts #1, which was illustrated by Michael Golden, the first artist Adams noticed significantly. He relates:

I was collecting comic books from the mid-70s, and then I discovered Michael Golden working on Micronauts. And I don't know exactly what it is about the very first issue of Micronauts. Something about it just blew me away. That was the book that made me say, 'Yeah, this is what I'm going to do for my career, for the rest of my life. I'm going to find a way to draw comic books, man!'

Adams would subsequently seek out work by other artists, such as Barry Windsor-Smith, whom he has called a "huge" influence upon his work, and Mike Kaluta, Bernie Wrightson and Terry Austin. Adams also cites Bill Sienkiewicz's "Moon Knight" work in The Hulk! magazine and in particular Walter Simonson's work on The Uncanny X-Men and The New Teen Titans, which Adams saw as "the bible of how to draw comics", and "the perfect example of how to do a team book." Adams names Simonson and Golden as his two largest artistic influences. Simonson and his wife, writer/editor Louise Simonson, would later become close friends and collaborators with Adams, with Louise editing Adams' breakthrough project, Longshot. Adams also says he was influenced by Jack Kirby after he became a professional artist. Because he tends to consult source material when illustrating a book, he studied much of Kirby's work in particular during his 1990 run on Fantastic Four, learning much about focusing on clarity and dynamism over attention to detail. In a 1997 interview, Adams responded to the observation that fans had noticed a manga influence in his work by stating that he had likely been influenced by Masamune Shirow. Aside from books on drawing human anatomy, Adams' only formal education in illustration was learning newspaper strip-type drawing in his freshman year of high school from Mr. Vandenberg, a teacher who stressed the importance of clear storytelling and perspective. After a female classmate Adams was attracted to talked him into joining the acting club, Adams also considered becoming an actor, eventually doing community theater for two years. He quit acting when he turned 19, in order to concentrate on drawing.

== Career ==
=== Early work ===
Cover to Marvel Comics' Longshot #1 (September 1985) by Adams

Adams initially created a portfolio of pinups and monster splash pages, and added story sequences when he began attending comics conventions at age 17. At one of them, Adams met someone who, after seeing Adams' artwork, asked Adams for a submission for a comic book fanzine he was putting together called High-Energy. Adams submitted the horror story "One-Eyed Jack", which saw print High-Energy #1 (cover dated Spring 1982). Though it was an unpaid work, it was Adams' first published work, though he has lightheartedly decried its quality, saying, "It was pretty bad."

Adams' first paid work was a Farrah Foxette pinup that he copied from Farrah Fawcett's iconic 1976 swimsuit poster, which he submitted to the letters page of the DC Comics series Captain Carrot and His Amazing Zoo Crew! That series' editor, Roy Thomas, paid Adams $10 to publish the piece as a fan pinup.

At a Creation Convention in San Francisco, Adams received career advice from Steve Leialoha and Chris Claremont, and also met another aspiring illustrator, Mike Mignola, with whom Adams became friends, and later, business partners. Because of the popularity of the X-Men, Adams included a Wolverine story in his portfolio, although he was only a casual fan of the X-Men himself. He would later become closely associated with the X-Men in his early career. After showing his portfolio to editor Bob Schreck at a Creation Convention, he gained permission to set up a table, doing drawings for fans for $5 – $10. He began submitting samples to Marvel Comics when he was 18, taking a job at a pizzeria after graduating high school.

Adams' first professional job came about after he met Joe Rubinstein at a Creation Convention. Rubinstein took Adams' samples to Marvel editors Dennis O'Neil and Linda Grant, who in 1983 offered Adams the chance to write and draw "The Return of Richard Buzznick", a short story for the black and white anthology Bizarre Adventures. Though Adams completed the story, the series was canceled before his story was published, and Adams returned to submitting samples while working at the pizzeria. Adams later dismissed the story as poorly drawn. He also drew "Away Off There Amid The Softly Winking Lights", a story in the 1984 Pacific Comics anthology Three Dimensional Alien Worlds.

=== Longshot and X-Men ===
Al Milgrom, who was ending his career as a Marvel editor to go freelance, found Adams' samples as he was cleaning out his office for its future occupant, editor Carl Potts. Potts and his assistant editor, Ann Nocenti, sent Adams a Defenders script, from which Adams did layouts of 10 to 15 pages. Adams stated that while his action scenes were not rendered very well, the editors praised his casual, character-based scenes. Nocenti described to Adams the concept for a miniseries she was writing, Longshot, which had been turned down by every other artist she offered it to. Adams, now a couple of months before his twentieth birthday, did a series of preliminary design drawings, basing the main character's appearance and hairstyle on that of singer Limahl, and the female lead, Ricochet Rita, on Nocenti herself. The series was freelance-edited by Louise Simonson, and without a firm schedule, which provided Adams the time he needed to complete it. This was due in part to his problems with perspective and other things he was not accustomed to drawing, such as windmills, babies and people smiling, and in part because he had to redraw the first half of it, as Ann Nocenti's story was so dense that the pages featured up to 20 panels. As a result, Adams took eight months to draw the first issue. This problem was addressed by editor Elliot Brown, who showed Adams how to compose panels depicting multiple actions. Simonson would later introduce Adams to Marvel editor-in-chief Jim Shooter, who furthered Adams' understanding of storytelling clarity by sitting down with him and showing him the panel-to-panel structure in an old Marvel book. He would take two years to draw all six issues of the miniseries. Prior to the release of Longshot, Adams drew the cover of Marvel Fanfare #13, which was released March 10, 1984, marking his first published work for Marvel. He also penciled Page 30 of Secret Wars, which was inked by Mike Mignola, and released April 10, 1985, though Adams was not credited in the book. Longshot #1 was published on September 1, 1985, with a cover date of September 1985. Reviewing the first issue for Amazing Heroes, R.A. Jones, who criticized the writing, stating:

Longshot does have one major saving grace, and that is the penciling of Arthur Adams. I'm going to once again go out on my prophetic limb and predict that Art will soon become a fan favorite. He has a dynamic style that grabs your attention and won't let go. To be sure, he exhibits some of the weaknesses of any young artist, the occasional awkward pose or crude drawing--but as a first effort this is incredibly impressive. In fact, this limited series should be worth buying simply to watch the progress Adams makes from issue to issue.

Adams' association with the X-Men franchise early in his career included a number of posters, including this iconic 1986 image of Wolverine, inked by Terry Austin, which also became a bestselling retailer standee.

Nocenti's position as editor on the X-Men books led to Uncanny X-Men writer Chris Claremont's discovery of Adams' work, and in turn to Adams' frequent association with that franchise during the 1980s. This began with New Mutants Special Edition #1 and Uncanny X-Men Annual #9, which were part of the "Asgardian Wars" storyline, and which Adams began drawing before Longshot #1 was published. Nocenti also asked Adams to produce a cover for Heroes for Hope, a 1985 book intended to benefit famine relief in Africa, which was written and illustrated by dozens of creators, including writers Harlan Ellison and Stephen King, and artists John Byrne, Charles Vess and Bernie Wrightson. Nocenti asked Adams to pattern the cover after Paul Smith's 1983 cover of Uncanny X-Men #173, whose focus was Wolverine charging the viewer. This in turn led to Bob Budiansky, who was in charge of producing Marvel's posters, asking Adams to produce a Wolverine poster with the same type of pose. The image, inked by Terry Austin, became not only a bestselling poster, but an iconic life-size standee for comics shops, and led to two other posters by Adams, a 1987 X-Men poster featuring most of the characters that had ever been a member of that team, and "Mutants", a modification of Adams' 1988 Marvel Age Annual #4 cover that featured most of the characters appearing in all the X-Men-related books at the time, also with a charging Wolverine in the center. By 1986, Adams' professional career had been cemented, and he moved out of his parents' home and into the same Oakland, California apartment building where fellow artists Mike Mignola and Steve Purcell lived. Adams and Nocenti reunited for a story in Web of Spider-Man Annual #2 (1986) in which Warlock of the New Mutants encounters Spider-Man.

His work on the X-Men franchise would continue with a number of covers for The New Mutants and The Uncanny X-Men in 1986 and 1987, respectively. He also drew all but three of the first 23 covers and interior frontispieces to Classic X-Men from 1986 to 1988. His interior X-Men-related work included a two-issue run on X-Factor and the one-shot Excalibur: Mojo Mayhem, both in 1989, and three Uncanny X-Men Annuals, in 1986, 1988, and 1990. It was in drawing the 1988 annual that Adams says he felt like a professional comic book artist for the first time, as he first felt confident that he knew what he was doing.

=== Diversification and experimentation ===
Adams did work for publishers other than Marvel during the 1980s, as when he drew several pages of Batman #400 in 1986 and Action Comics Annual #1 in 1987. The latter is viewed as a turning point in Adam's drawing style, characterized by bulkier figures of Batman and Superman, though Adams explains that this was in part due to the influence of The Dark Knight Returns. Adams also explained that the overall change in art was style partly due to deliberate experimentation on his part, and partly to Dick Giordano's inking, which exhibited a different line weight. That same year, he illustrated Gumby Summer Fun Special #1 by Comico Comics, a job he obtained through Comico editor Diana Schutz, an old friend who noticed the incidental images of Gumby that Adams had included in the pages of Longshot. Adams, who did not harbor fond memories of that cartoon as a child, and who feared he would be typecast as a Gumby artist if he took the job, told Schultz he would only do it if she could get Bob Burden to write it, on the assumption that Schultz would decline this condition. Schultz, who initially wanted Mark Evanier for the job, considered this, and eventually agreed to it after contacting Burden, who was enthusiastic about the idea. That book, which demonstrated Adams' versatility in handling comedy as well as superheroics, garnered him and Burden a 1988 Eisner Award for Best Single Issue. Adams would later illustrate a second Gumby book, Gumby's Winter Fun Special, which was written by Steve Purcell.

Adams was one of 54 artists profiled in Ron Goulart's 1989 book, The Great Comic Book Artists, Volume 2, whose front and back covers Adams illustrated.

=== 1990s monster and creator-owned work ===
Adams' 1990s Marvel work included a 1990 three-issue run on Fantastic Four, in which the Hulk, Spider-Man, Wolverine and Ghost Rider formed a replacement Fantastic Four after being falsely informed that three of the original Fantastic Four had been murdered. Series writer Walter Simonson, who also was the regular artist on the title, decided to write a story for Adams to draw in order to catch up on his deadlines. Simonson asked Marvel's Marketing Department who the four top-selling characters were, and was told they were Wolverine, Ghost Rider, Spider-Man, and the Punisher. Adams disliked the Punisher, and especially disliked drawing guns, because he felt he was not good at it, and suggested the Hulk. When Simonson asked him what he liked to draw, Adams indicated that he was a fan of the classic elements of the book, such as the Mole Man and the Skrulls, which Simonson incorporated into the story. The three-issue arc, which is cited by Adams as one of his favorite works, was later referenced by late night talk show host Conan O'Brien in the "Fan Corrections" segment of a 2012 episode of Conan. Adams did more work for the X-Men franchise, such as the 1997 intercompany crossover one-shot Gen^{13}/Generation X. His 1990s Marvel work also included providing designs for a line of Hulk action figures.

Adams became acquainted with Randy Stradley and other staff members of Dark Horse Comics, after which he illustrated a number of their books featuring the classic Universal Monsters he loved in his youth. His first Godzilla work was Godzilla Color Special #1 in 1992. For that story Adams created an organization called G-Force, which he designed to be a Japanese version of the Fantastic Four, and in the story, had that group mention that they had fought the Shrewmanoid, a villain Adams later created for Monkeyman & O'Brien. Toho, the production company that produces the Godzilla films, would later introduce a version of that team in the 1993 film Godzilla vs. Mechagodzilla II. A book on the making of that film features a cover illustration of Godzilla that was copied from the Color Special, which amused Adams. Adams would follow these with other Godzilla works, such as "King Kong vs. Godzilla", a story that appeared in the anthology Urban Legends #1 that is notable for being the only work of his to date that he wrote, penciled, inked and lettered, and "Tramplin' Tokyo", an Alan Moore story he drew for Negative Burn #18 (December 1994). In 1995 he drew Godzilla vs. Hero Zero, and wrote issues 5–8 of Target: Godzilla! When Adams learned that Dark Horse would acquire the rights to the Universal Monsters, Adams lobbied to them to illustrate a comics sequel to the 1954 film Creature from the Black Lagoon, but Dark Horse wanted to produce an adaptation of the film first, and told Adams that if he illustrated that, that he would be able to illustrate a future sequel. The 50-page adaptation was published in 1993, but the line's low sales cost Dark Horse money, and it was canceled after four books, precluding the sequel that Adams wanted to draw.

Cover art to Monkeyman and O'Brien #1 (July 1996), Adams' creator-owned work, which was published by Dark Horse Comics as part of the Legend imprint

In the early 1990s, Adams and Mignola were contacted by Erik Larsen, who invited them to produce books of their own creation for Image Comics, which Larsen and a group of other artists formed to publish creator-owned books. Adams had never before considered producing his own original material, as he preferred to illustrate the properties he enjoyed as a child. However, his talks with Larsen convinced him to create Monkeyman and O'Brien, a duo similar in concept to Angel and the Ape. The stories star San Francisco native Ann Darrow O'Brien, whose name is a tribute to Fay Wray's character from King Kong and that film's special effects creator Willis O'Brien, and Axewell Tiberius, a super-intelligent gorilla man from another dimension. The duo finds itself embroiled in a variety of adventures typical of classic B-movies, often featuring the type of movie monsters Adams is fond of, such as the subterranean Shrewmanoid and the extraterrestrial Froglodytes. Despite the offer from Image, Adams and Mignola (the latter of whom created Hellboy, which had been rejected by DC Comics), took their ideas to Dark Horse, for whom Adams had already done work, as it would allow them to collaborate with creators they admired, such as Frank Miller and John Byrne. Together with Paul Chadwick, Mike Allred, Dave Gibbons, and Geof Darrow, the creators formed Legend, a creator-owned imprint of Dark Horse. After an initial 1993 appearance in San Diego Comic Con Comics #2, Monkeyman and O'Brien appeared in installments in Dark Horse Presents #80 in 1993 and Dark Horse Insider #27 in 1994. The duo's first appearance under the Legend imprint was an ongoing backup story in Mike Mignola's 1994 Hellboy: Seed of Destruction miniseries. They would eventually graduate to their own self-titled miniseries in 1996. When first producing the series, Adams had on hand the Marvel Monsterworks reprint of the Atlas Comics monster stories "Where Monsters Dwell" and "Creatures on the Loose" for inspiration. Although the Legend imprint ceased in 1998, Monkeyman and O'Brien continued to appear in print, sometimes in crossover stories with other comics characters, as in Savage Dragon #41 (September 1997) by Erik Larsen, and Gen^{13}/MonkeyMan and O'Brien (1998), both published by Image Comics, the latter of which Adams wrote and drew for Wildstorm Productions.

In 1996 Dark Horse Comics published Art Adams' Creature Features, a collection of Adams' previously published stories that paid tribute to various B-movie monsters, some of which had originally been published in black and white, but which were colored for the collection. They included Adams' Creature from the Black Lagoon, two of his Godzilla stories, "The Shocking Case of the Brief Journey" from San Diego Comic Con Comics #2, and the "Trapped In The Lair of the Shrewmanoid" story from Dark Horse Insider #27. The collection featured an introduction by Geoff Darrow.

=== 1999–2010s ===
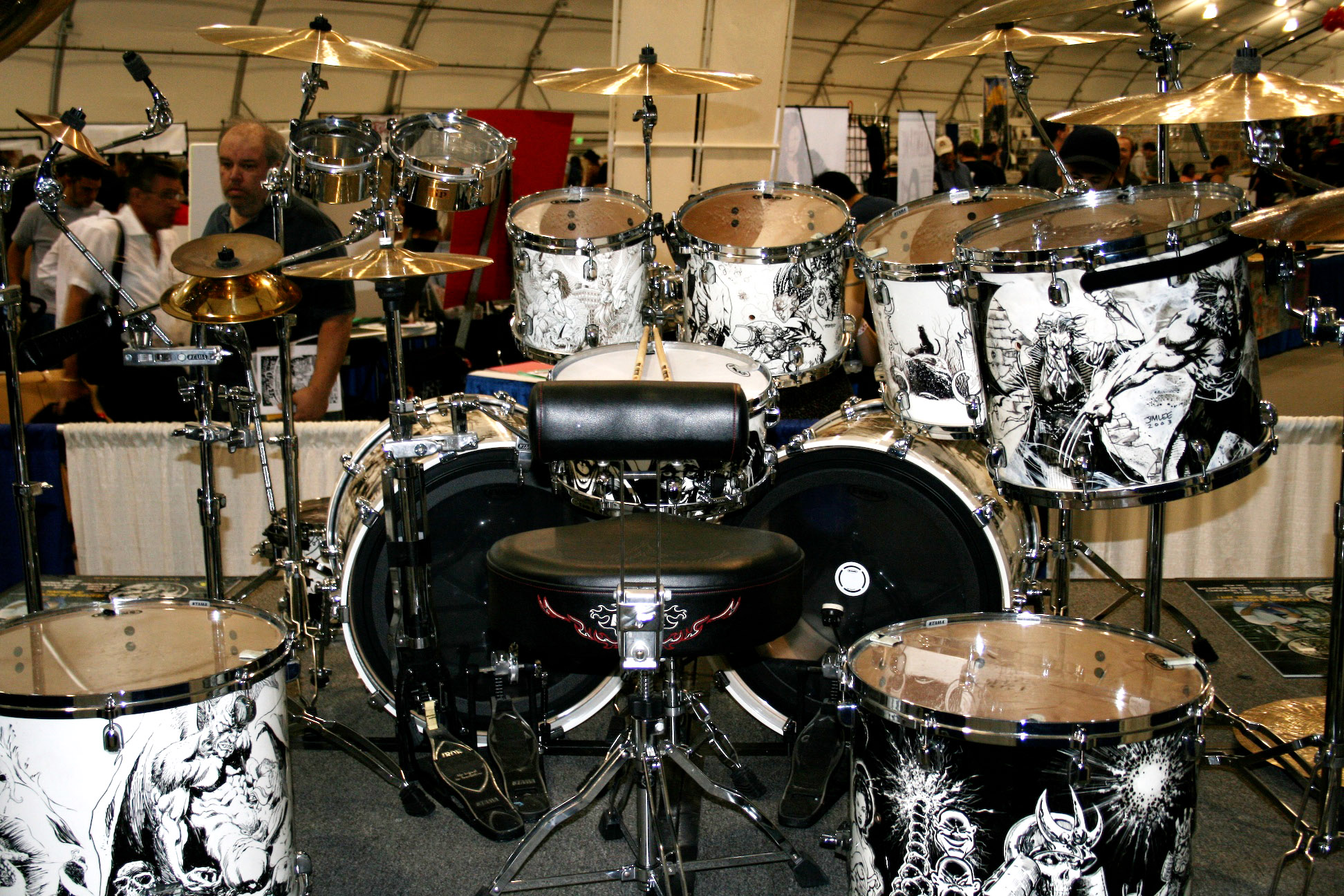
Drum kit used by System of a Down drummer John Dolmayan, featuring artwork by Adams and other commissioned artists. Adams' art is on the drum just above and to the left of center.

In 1999, Adams returned to Wildstorm to draw an eight-page flashback sequence in issue #4 of Alan Moore's series, Tom Strong, which was published under Moore's brand for Wildstorm, America's Best Comics. His subsequent Wildstorm work would include Danger Girl Special #1 (2000) and two issues of The Authority in 2002, significant portions of which Adams was asked by DC Comics to redraw in order to de-emphasize the violence, in light of the September 11 attacks, much to Adams' frustration. That same year, Adams and writer Steve Moore co-created "Jonni Future", a pastiche of a pulp science fiction series such as Adam Strange and Barbarella, which was published in eight-page installments in the America's Best Comics anthology Tom Strong's Terrific Tales, the first ten issues of which Adams penciled from 2002 to 2004. Adams work on "Jonni Future" has been characterized as exhibiting a romantic influence, with greater amounts realism and fine hatching, which Adams refers to as "noodling". Adams says he was inspired by sources such as Paolo Eleuteri Serpieri, Warren Publishing's Vampirella, and the character designs in Capcom video game character books when he drew "Jonni Future", and refrained from using straight edges or templates in order to achieve a more elegant, hand-drawn appearance. He regards "Jonni Future" as his best work.

In the early 2000s Adams was commissioned to create artwork for the drum kit used by System of a Down drummer John Dolmayan, an avid comic book collector and vendor. Dolmayan commissioned Adams to illustrate a scene of giant women fighting robots and Godzilla for one drum, while the art for other drums in the kit, which depicted other characters and scenes, were produced by Simon Bisley, Kevin Eastman, and Tim Vigil.

Throughout the 2000s, Adams provided cover images for various DC Comics, such as Superman, Batman, and JLA: Scary Monsters, as well as for books by various other publishers, such as Vampirella, Red Sonja, Jurassic Park, Madman Adventures, Thundercats, Xena: Warrior Princess, and Buffy the Vampire Slayer. Adams' 2000s Marvel cover work include Generation X #67 - 72 in 2000 and 2001, and Incredible Hercules #113 - 115 in 2008, as well for three of its collected editions. His 2000s interior comics work includes Superman/Batman #26 (2006), an issue dedicated to writer Jeph Loeb's late son, Sam, to which dozens of writers and artists contributed. In 2008 he illustrated a Red Hulk story in King-Size Hulk #1, and later illustrated a Hulk/Wendigo story that appeared in 11-page installments Hulk #7 - 9, as well as those issues' covers. In 2010 he illustrated Ultimate X #1-5, his first work for the Ultimate Marvel line of comic books.

=== 2010s–present ===
In 2014, Adams illustrated variant covers for each of the eight issues of Marvel Comics miniseries Original Sin, composing them as eight pieces of a single, interlocked image, which depicts all of the major characters of the Marvel Universe. It was the single piece that took the longest for Adams to complete, at 10 weeks.

Outside the field of comics, Adams has provided illustrations for various magazines, such as PlayStation Magazine, as well as toy designs, video games, and X-Men-themed cans of Chef Boyardee pasta. A recreation of Barry Windsor-Smith's classic cover to Avengers #100 that Adams drew on a whim was later used by Marvel Comics as a variant cover to an actual issue, and in July 2019, as the image of a 500-piece jigsaw puzzle licensed by Aquarius.

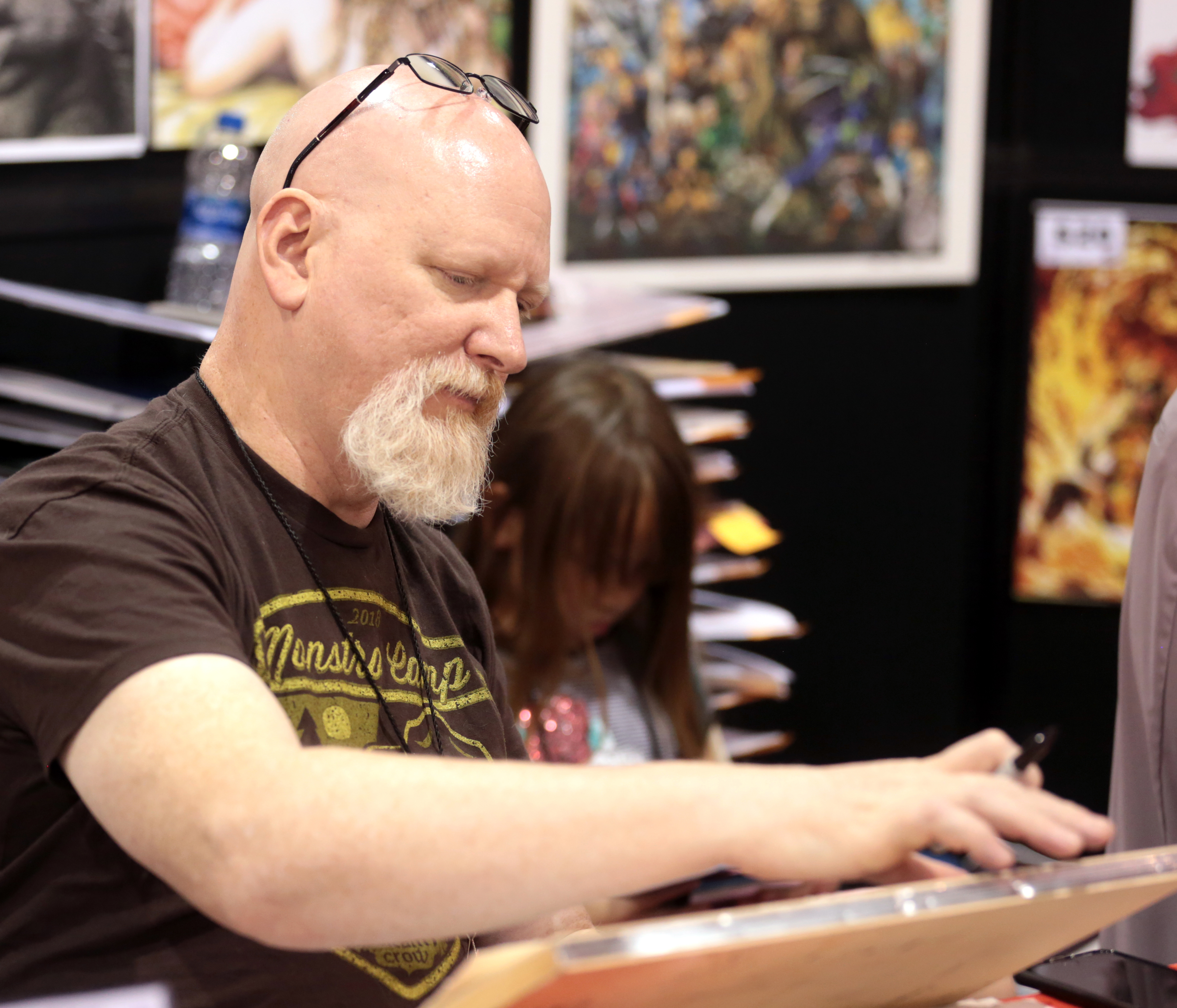
Adams at the 2018 Phoenix Comic Fest

On November 30, 2011, Gumby Comics/Wildcard Ink published a single volume collecting Adams' previous two specials featuring Gumby. The book was initially called Gumby's Arthur Adams Specials, but was eventually published with a sticker covering Adams' name on the cover, effectively renaming the book Gumby's Spring Specials. According to Rich Johnston of Bleeding Cool, this was done on Adams' request, who wanted nothing to do with the publisher, and took action to keep his name off the book's cover. The book is nonetheless sold by merchants such as Mile High Comics under its originally intended name.

In 2016 Adams provided the illustrations for a satirical piece in GQ magazine that imagined a number of controversial public figures as comic book supervillains, including Donald Trump, Vladimir Putin, Sepp Blatter, Martin Shkreli, and Kris Jenner. Later that year, Dynamite Entertainment announced it that would be producing limited edition poly-resin busts of female characters for its Women of Dynamite line, based on Adams' renditions of those characters and sculpted by Jason Smith. The first bust was a Red Sonja bust debuting in November, followed by a Vampirella bust in February 2017. In the late 2010s, Adams illustrated cover runs on Guardians of the Galaxy (Vol 4) and X-Men Blue.

In February 2020, Marvel released Marvel Monograph: The Art Of Arthur Adams, a 120-page omnibus collection of Adams' art.

In April 2022, Adams was reported among the more than three dozen comics creators who contributed to Operation USA's benefit anthology book, Comics for Ukraine: Sunflower Seeds, a project spearheaded by IDW Publishing Special Projects Editor Scott Dunbier, whose profits would be donated to relief efforts for Ukrainian refugees resulting from the February 2022 Russian invasion of Ukraine. Adams would provide one of the covers to the softcover edition of the book.

Though his work for Marvel takes priority for him, he also makes a significant amount of his income from private commissions, which he produces when time permits. In a 2017 interview he stated that if he did interior work again, it would more likely be on a creator-owned project, like Monkeyman And O'Brien.

On October 11, 2024, the Harvey Awards announced that Adams was one of five comics creators to be inducted into the Harvey Awards Hall of Fame at the 36th annual Harvey Awards ceremony on October 18 at the New York Comic Con. The other four inductees were Akira Toriyama, Larry Hama, Sergio Aragonés, and John Buscema. Upon learning of the honor, Adams reacted by commenting, "Wow! What an unexpected honor! And to be inducted with these four giants of the comics industry! Amazing! Thank you so much Harvey Awards! I'm shocked!"

== Technique and materials ==
Adams was heavily influenced by the work of Paolo Eleuteri Serpieri, among other sources, in illustrating "Jonni Future", which he considers his best work.

Adams' art style is noted for its high level of detail, and he has a reputation of being a "tight" penciller. He states that he works at a slow pace, which limits the amount of work he does. When he penciled Fantastic Four #347–349 in 1990 for regular writer/illustrator Walter Simonson, who needed a break in order to catch up on his own work on that title, Adams managed to pencil the first two issues in five weeks and four weeks, respectively, but was considerably late on the third. In 1997 Adams stated that he could produce a page of either pencils or inks in a day. In a 2007 interview, he stated he tends to produce 2/3 to 3/4 of a page a day, and can also ink at that rate, but can do up to two pages in a day if he is under pressure, as when he produced Cloak and Dagger #9 (1986) in 22 days, for example. Another example is the 1989 one-shot Excalibur: Mojo Mayhem, which due to changing deadlines, he completed at a quicker pace. In a 2002 interview, Adams singled out one page of that book that he drew in a half-hour as his personal record for speed, but decried its poor quality, saying that the book was his least favorite work of his, despite the fact that it earned him among the highest amount of royalties. Adams is also noted for the humor in his work, as with, for example, the extraneous characters he places in cameo appearances in the backgrounds of his comics, as when he drew Gumby in the panels of Longshot, or the forms in which he depicted the shapeshifting alien Warlock in his The New Mutants work.

Adams prefers to work from a plot rather than from a full script, a result of Ann Nocenti's dense Longshot scripts, though he has worked from a full script, as with his work on Three Dimensional Alien Worlds for Pacific Comics and The Authority. Though he says he prefers group books because they more easily allow him to hide his "bad layout skills", he is nonetheless comfortable with solo character books. He begins drawing thumbnail layouts from the story he is given, either at home or in a public place. The thumbnails range in size from 2 inches x 3 inches to half the size of the printed comic book. He or an assistant will then enlarge the thumbnails and trace them onto illustration board with a non-photo blue pencil, sometimes using a Prismacolor light blue pencil, because it is not too waxy, and erases easily. When working on the final illustration board, he does so on a large drawing board when in his basement studio, and a lapboard when sitting on his living room couch. After tracing the thumbnails, he will then clarify details with another light blue pencil, and finalize the details with a Number 2 pencil. He drew the first three chapters of "Jonni Future" at twice the printed comic size, and also drew the fifth chapter, "The Garden of the Sklin", at a size larger than standard, in order to render more detail than usual in those stories. For a large poster image with a multitude of characters, he will go over the figure outlines with a marker in order to emphasize them. He will use photographic reference when appropriate, as when he draws things that he is not accustomed to.

In the early part of his career, Adams' pencils were embellished by inkers such as Whilce Portacio, Dick Giordano and Terry Austin. When Adams attempted to ink his own work before becoming a professional, he initially used a Croquille pen, but after meeting Mike Mignola, he was spurred to switch to a brush, which he used for approximately a year before returning to a Croquille. He eventually began to ink his own work, which he prefers to do. Beginning in the late 1990s, he began using the Staedtler Pigment Liner, a felt-tip pen. He prefers pens to brushes because pens feel "looser", and cited this as his reason for using felt-tip pens when he inked "Jonni Future".

Although Adams has experimented with painting with watercolor and oil paints (his 1989 covers for Appleseed were rendered with a combination of ink, watercolor and color pencil), his color work is so sporadic that he says he has to relearn what he has forgotten in the interim each time, and is usually dissatisfied with the results. Because a significant portion of his income is derived from selling his original artwork, he is reluctant to learn how to produce his work digitally.

Adams has explained his view on illustrating covers by saying, "My job is to make the characters look as good as I can in the context of what they’re asking for. So I always just try to represent the characters to the best of my ability and sell the book." When asked for his favorite cover work, he named X-Men Blue #9 (October 2017), featuring Polaris, which was a homage to Jim Steranko's cover of X-Men #50 (November 1968).

Adams does not have a favorite character to draw, having remarked in a 2015 interview, "I'm just happy that they pay me to draw." Nonetheless, he stated in a 2019 interview that while he had not harbored any strong emotional attachment to the X-Men as a child, he had been drawn to that franchise because "I just like the characters and I've worked on them enough that they trust me," and has gone on to name his favorite X-Men characters to draw. He said he loves Domino as a character, despite not having had many opportunities to draw her; he enjoyed depicting Wolverine out of costume in a storyline that paired him with Jubilee; has called Kitty Pryde a good character; and enjoys drawing Colossus, X-23, and Jean Grey. He dislikes drawing the Punisher, because he believes that he is not adept at drawing guns.

== Influence ==
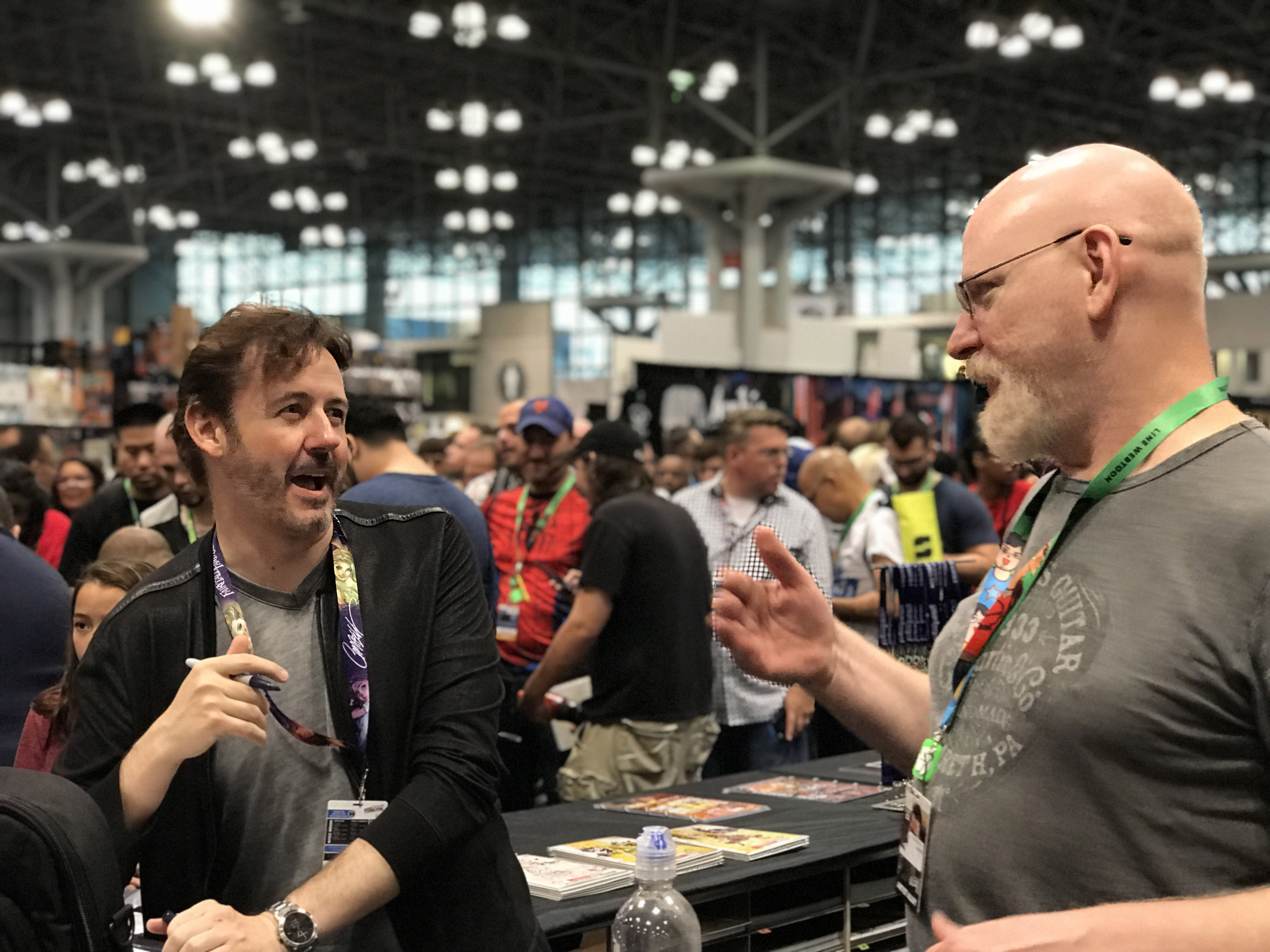
J. Scott Campbell (left) is one of the artists who was influenced by Adams (right), seen here during an appearance at Campbell's booth at the 2017 New York Comic Con.

Adams is one of the most popular and widely imitated artists in the American comics industry. His style is attributed as a direct influence on the artists who would found Image Comics, and the other popular artists of the 1990s associated with that era, such as Jim Lee and Rob Liefeld. Timothy Callahan of Comic Book Resources points to the use of dynamic action poses, idealized figures, costume designs featuring numerous accessories, a preference for copious crosshatching over brushwork in rendering, and the depiction of cybernetic limbs and other reflective surfaces seen in those artists' styles as being derived from Adams' work, in particular his run on Longshot. Callahan also points out that the detailed webbing for which Todd McFarlane became known during his run on Spider-Man had previously been used by Adams on the cover of Longshot #4, although Callahan notes that Adams did not necessarily originate these elements, but was influenced himself by Michael Golden and Micronauts, he states that Adams popularized them. Adams' conception of Spider-Man with a large-eyed mask, detailed "spaghetti"-style webbing, and more contorted poses while web-swinging can be seen in Web of Spider-Man Annual #2, published in June 1986 (approximately 1½ years before Todd McFarlane's first published Spider-Man work, The Amazing Spider-Man #298). Noting also that Adams' Longshot pencils were inked by Whilce Portacio and an uncredited Scott Williams, Callahan refers to that book as "early Image, in primal form". Artists whose work has been viewed as imitative of Adams' style, or who have named Adams as an influence include Joe Madureira, J. Scott Campbell, Ed McGuinness, Aaron Kuder, Shelby Robertson, Olivier Coipel, and Nick Bradshaw.

== Personal life ==
Adams is married to fellow comics artist Joyce Chin, whom he met at the 1996 San Diego Comic-Con. Chin has inked Adams' pencils, and Adams has inked Chin's, as on Xena: Warrior Princess #4 (January 2000). As of 1997 they lived in Portland, Oregon. They later moved to San Francisco, California, before settling in Walnut Creek.

When asked to name a favorite comic, Adams has named Ultimate X-Men #41 by writer Brian Michael Bendis and artist David Finch, which depicts Wolverine as he befriends a teenaged boy hiding in cave after his out-of-control emerging powers have killed hundreds of people, including those closest to him. Adams said of the story, "It's a standalone story, it's Bendis, it's one of my favorite comics of all time."

His favorite Godzilla film is Godzilla vs. The Thing, and his other favorites include Ghidorah, the Three-Headed Monster and Monster Zero. His favorite color is green.

Regarding religion, Adams has stated that he does not believe in "any particular god". He does not drive.

== Awards and accolades ==
- 1986: Russ Manning Most Promising Newcomer Award
- 1988: Eisner Award for Best Single Issue (with Bob Burden for Gumby Summer Fun Special #1)
- 2017: Inkpot Award
- 2024: Inducted into the Harvey Awards Hall of Fame

== Bibliography ==
=== Interior work ===
- Three Dimensional Alien Worlds: "Away Off There Amid the Softly Winking Lights" (with Bruce Jones, one-shot, Pacific Comics, 1984)
- Longshot #1–6 (with Ann Nocenti, Marvel, 1985)
- New Mutants Special Edition #1: "Home is Where the Heart is" (with Chris Claremont, Marvel, 1985)
- Uncanny X-Men Annual #9–10, 12, 14 (with Chris Claremont, Marvel, 1985–1990)
- Batman #400: "Resurrection Night!" (with Doug Moench, among other artists, DC Comics, 1986)
- Cloak and Dagger #9: "The Lady and the Unicorn" (with Bill Mantlo, Marvel, 1986)
- Web of Spider-Man Annual #2: "Wake Me Up I Gotta Be Dreaming" (with Ann Nocenti, Marvel, 1986)
- Action Comics Annual #1: "Skeeter" (with John Byrne, DC Comics, 1987)
- Gumby's Summer Fun Special: "Summer Fun Adventure" (with Bob Burden, one-shot, Comico, 1987)
- Gumby's Winter Fun Special: "Winter Fun Adventure" (with Steve Purcell, one-shot, Comico, 1988)
- Wonder Woman Annual #1: "Chapter 1: The Diving Bird" (with George Pérez, DC Comics, 1988)
- X-Factor #41–42 (with Louise Simonson, Marvel, 1989)
- Excalibur: Mojo Mayhem (with Chris Claremont, one-shot, Marvel, 1989)
- Fantastic Four #347–349 (with Walter Simonson, Marvel, 1990–1991)
- Marvel Holiday Special #1 (with Walter Simonson, Marvel, 1991)
- Armageddon: Inferno #1, 3–4 (with John Ostrander, DC Comics, 1992)
- Godzilla Color Special: "Godzilla: King of the Monsters" (with Randy Stradley, one-shot, Dark Horse, 1992)
- Creepy 1993 Fearbook: "Bugs" (with Kurt Busiek, Harris Comics, 1993)
- Urban Legends: "King Kong vs. Godzilla" (one-shot, Dark Horse, 1993)
- Universal Monsters: Creature from the Black Lagoon (with Steve Moncuse, one-shot, Dark Horse, 1993)
- Monkeyman and O'Brien (Dark Horse, 1993–1999):
  - Dark Horse Presents #80, 100, 118–119 (1993–1997)
  - Hellboy: Seed of Destruction (co-feature, 1994)
  - Monkeyman and O'Brien #1–3 (1996)
  - Dark Horse Extra #1–7 (1998–1999)
- The Big Book of Urban Legends: "The Spider in the Hairdo" (with Robert Boyd, Jan Harold Brunvald and Robert Loren Fleming, Paradox Press, 1994)
- Negative Burn #18: "Alan Moore's Songbook: Trampling Tokyo" (with Alan Moore, Caliber Press, 1994)
- Asylum #1: "Warchild" (with Eric Stephenson, Extreme Comics, 1995)
- Aliens: Havoc #1 (with Mark Schultz, among other artists, Dark Horse, 1997)
- Gen^{13} (Wildstorm, 1997–1998):
  - Gen^{13}/Generation X: "Generation Gap" (with Brandon Choi, one-shot, 1997)
  - Gen^{13} 3D Special: "Mauling" (one-shot, 1997)
  - Gen^{13}/Monkeyman and O'Brien #1–2 (1998)
  - Gen^{13} #34: "I Want My Mommaaaaa!!" (with John Arcudi, 1998)
- Starship Troopers #1–2 (with Bruce Jones and Mitch Byrd, Dark Horse, 1997)
- Legends of the DC Universe 80-Page Giant #2: "The Great Unknown!" (with Karl Kesel, DC Comics, 1998)
- Danger Girl Special: "Delusions of Grandeur" (with J. Scott Campbell and Andy Hartnell, Cliffhanger, 2000)
- Superman vol. 2 #165: "Help!" (with Jeph Loeb, DC Comics, 2001)
- Orion #10, 12: "Legends of Apokolips" (with Walter Simonson, DC Comics, 2001)
- The Authority #27–28: "Brave New World, Parts Two and Three" (with Mark Millar and Grant Morrison (uncredited), Wildstorm, 2002)
- Tom Strong's Terrific Tales #1–4, 6–10: "Jonni Future" (with Steve Moore, America's Best Comics, 2002–2004)
- The Many Worlds of Tesla Strong (with Alan Moore and Peter K. Hogan, among other artists, one-shot, Wildstorm, 2003)
- Action Comics Annual #10 : "The Many Deaths of Superman" (DC Comics, 2007)
- Countdown to Final Crisis #14: "The Origin of Gorilla Grodd" (with Scott Beatty, co-feature, DC Comics, 2008)
- King-Size Hulk: "Where Monsters Dwell" (with Jeph Loeb, Marvel, 2008)
- Hulk #7–9 (with Jeph Loeb, Marvel, 2008)
- Ultimate Comics: X (with Jeph Loeb, Marvel, 2010–2011)
- AvX: VS #6 (with Jeph Loeb, Marvel, 2012, pg 18)
- All-New X-Men #25 (Marvel, 2014)

=== Cover work ===
- Marvel Fanfare #13 (Marvel Comics, 1984)
- Marvel Team-Up #141 (Marvel, 1984)
- Micronauts: The New Voyages #2 (Marvel, 1984)
- The Defenders #142 (Marvel, 1985)
- The New Mutants Special Edition (Marvel, 1985)
- X-Men Annual #9 (Marvel, 1985)
- The New Mutants #38–39 (Marvel, 1986)
- Firestar #3 (Marvel, 1986)
- Classic X-Men #1–23 (Marvel, 1986–1988)
- Daredevil #238–239 (Marvel, 1987)
- Uncanny X-Men #214, 218 (Marvel, 1987)
- The Spectre Annual #1 (DC Comics, 1988)
- Marvel Age Annual #4 (Marvel, 1988)
- The Last of the Viking Heroes #7 (Genesis West Comics, 1989)
- Tommy and the Monsters #1 (New Comics Group, 1989)
- Appleseed Book Two #1–5 (Eclipse Comics, 1989)
- The Impossible Man Summer Vacation Spectacular (Marvel, 1990)
- Marvel Super-Heroes #6 (1991)
- Conan the Barbarian #247–249 (Marvel, 1991)
- Animal Confidential (Dark Horse Comics, 1992)
- Vampirella: Summer Nights #1 (Harris Comics, 1992)
- Marvel Holiday Special '92 (Marvel, 1993)
- Showcase '93 #1 (DC Comics, 1993)
- Superman: Legacy of Superman #1 (DC Comics, 1993)
- Dark Horse Comics #11 (Dark Horse, 1993)
- Comics' Greatest World: Vortex #2 (Comics' Greatest World, 1993)
- Out of the Vortex #7 (Dark Horse, 1994)
- Classic Star Wars: A New Hope #1 (Dark Horse, 1994)
- Division 13 #1 (Comics' Greatest World, 1994)
- Medal of Honor #2 (Dark Horse, 1994)
- Gen^{13} #1 (Wildstorm, 1995)
- New Men #12 (Extreme Studios, 1995)
- Godzilla #1-7 (Dark Horse, 1995)
- Avengelyne #3 (Maximum Press, 1995)
- Badrock Annual #1 (Image, 1995)
- Godzilla vs. Hero Zero #1 (Dark Horse, 1995)
- Leonard Nimoy's Primortals: Origins #1-2 (Tekno Comix, 1995)
- Oblivion #1 (Comico, 1995)
- Leonard Nimoy's Primortals #13-14 (Tekno Comix, 1996)
- Untold Tales of Spider-Man #17 (Marvel, 1996)
- The Real Adventures of Jonny Quest #9 (Dark Horse, 1997)
- Star Kid #1 (Dark Horse, 1998)
- Crimson #2 (Cliffhanger, 1998)
- Buffy the Vampire Slayer #1, 6 (Dark Horse, 1998–1999)
- Daring Escapes #1 (Image, 1998)
- Clerks: Holiday Special #1 (Oni Press, 1998)
- Darkchylde: The Legacy #2-3 (Image, 1998)
- Nathan Never #1-4 (Dark Horse, 1999)
- Wildcats #1 (Wildstorm, 1999)
- Lady Death: The Rapture #1 (Chaos!, 1999)
- Purgatori: Goddess Rising #1 (Chaos!, 1999)
- JLA Annual #3 (DC Comics, 1999)
- Batman Annual #23 (DC Comics, 1999)
- Aquaman Annual #5 (DC Comics, 1999)
- Wonder Woman Annual #8 (DC Comics, 1999)
- The Flash Annual #12 (DC Comics, 1999)
- Superman Annual #11 (DC Comics, 1999)
- Green Lantern Annual #8 (DC Comics, 1999)
- Martian Manhunter Annual #2 (DC Comics, 1999)
- Tellos #4 (Image, 1999)
- Tom Strong #4 (America's Best Comics, 1999)
- Lionheart #2 (Awesome, 1999)
- X-Men #100 (Marvel, 2000)
- X-Men: The Movie Special Edition #1 (Marvel, 2000)
- Generation X #67-72 (Marvel, 2000–2001)
- Kin #6 (Top Cow, 2000)
- Gatecrasher #5 (Black Bull, 2000)
- X-Men Annual '00 (Marvel, 2000)
- Deadpool #50 (Marvel, 2001)
- Defenders #2 (Marvel, 2001)
- Cavewoman: Pangaean Sea #0 (Basement, 2001)
- Angel and the Ape #1-4 (Vertigo, 2001–2002)
- The Authority #29 (Wildstorm, 2002)
- Thundercats #1 (Wildstorm, 2002)
- Tom Strong's Terrific Tales #5, 12 (America's Best Comics, 2003–2005)
- JLA: Scary Monsters #1-6 (DC Comics, 2003)
- Magdalena/ Vampirella #1 (Top Cow, 2003)
- Wildguard: Casting Call #3 (Image, 2003)
- Witchblade /Magdalena/ Vampirella #1 (Top Cow, 2004)
- Alter Nation #1 (Image, 2004)
- Action Comics #814-821 (DC Comics, 2004–2005)
- Red Sonja #1-2, 25, 50 (Dynamite, 2005–2010)
- Worldstorm #1 (Wildstorm, 2006)
- The Authority #1 (Wildstorm, 2006)
- Justice League of America #5 (DC Comics, 2007)
- Manhunter #26 (DC Comics, 2007)
- Midnighter #2 (Wildstorm, 2007)
- Tales of the Unexpected #7 (DC Comics, 2007)
- Avengers Classic #1-12 (Marvel, 2007–2008)
- Booster Gold #1-2 (DC Comics, 2007)
- Countdown Presents: The Search for Ray Palmer — Wildstorm #1 (DC Comics, 2007)
- Fantastic Four #551, 583–584, 600 (Marvel, 2008–2011)
- The Incredible Hulk #112 (Marvel, 2008)
- The Incredible Hercules #113-115 (Marvel, 2008)
- Thor vol. 3 #6 (Marvel, 2008)
- The Perhapanauts #1 (Image, 2008)
- Invincible #50 (Image, 2008)
- Brit #7 (Image, 2008)
- Marvel Apes #0, 4 (2008–2009)
- Agents of Atlas #1 (Marvel, 2009)
- Hulk #10-12 (Marvel, 2009)
- Jurassic Park #2 (IDW Publishing, 2010)
- New Mutants #15, 25 (Marvel, 2010–2011)
- New Mutants Forever #2, 4 (Marvel, 2010–2011)
- Wolverine #2 (Marvel, 2010)
- Carnage #1-2 (Marvel, 2010–2011)
- Warlord of Mars: Dejah Thoris #1-5 (Dynamite, 2011)
- Avengers: The Children's Crusade #3 (Marvel, 2011)
- Captain America: Man Out of Time #1 (Marvel, 2011)
- Young Allies #6 (Marvel, 2011)
- Avengers Prime #5 (Marvel, 2011)
- Thunderbolts #154 (Marvel, 2011)
- Journey into Mystery #622 (Marvel, 2011)
- Astonishing X-Men #43 (Marvel, 2011)
- Godzilla: Legends #1-5 (IDW Publishing, 2011)
- The Fearless #1-12 (Marvel, 2011–2012)
- Godzilla #1 (IDW Publishing, 2012)
- Secret Avengers #22-25, 29-37 (Marvel, 2012–2013)
- Battle of the Atom #1-5 (Marvel, 2013)
- Uncanny Avengers Annual #1 (Marvel, 2014)
- Immortal X-Men #9 (Marvel, 2023)

Preceded by Scott McCloud	"Russ Manning Most Promising Newcomer"; Eisner Award recipient 1986	Succeeded by Eric Shanower
