= John Byrne (cartoonist) =

American comic book writer and artist (born 1950)

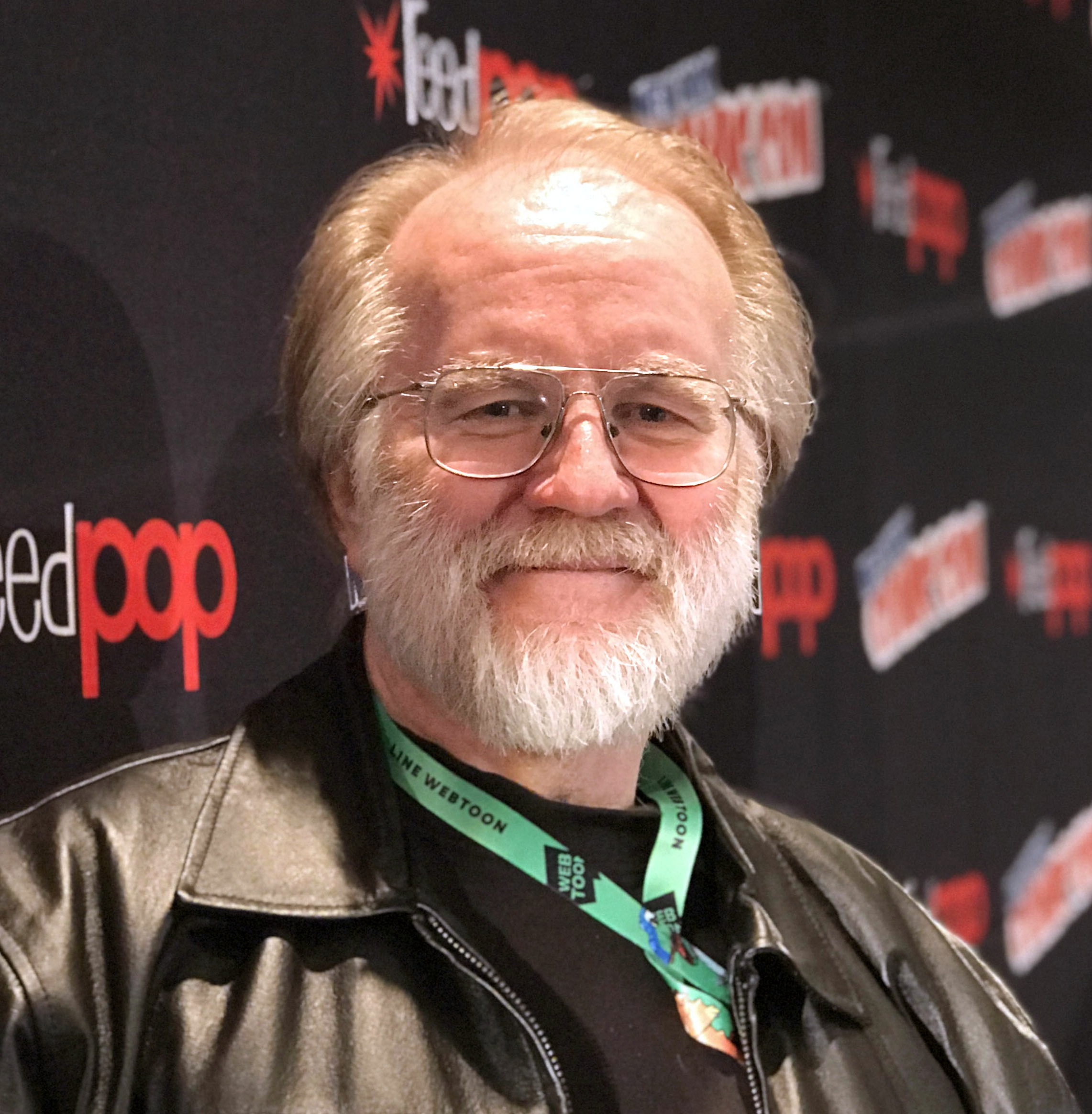
- Byrne in 2017
- Born: John Lindley Byrne; July 6, 1950 (age 76) Walsall, Staffordshire, England
- Areas: Writer, Penciller, Inker, Letterer
- Notable works: Uncanny X-Men; Fantastic Four; Superman; She-Hulk
- Awards: Eagle Awards – Favourite Comicbook Artist; (1978, 1979); Inkpot Award (1980); Will Eisner Award Hall of Fame (2015)

John Lindley Byrne (/bɜːrn/; born July 6, 1950) is an English-born American comic book writer and artist of superhero comics. Since the mid-1970s, Byrne has worked on many major superheroes; with noted work on Marvel Comics's X-Men and Fantastic Four. Byrne also facilitated the 1986 relaunch of DC Comics's Superman franchise with the limited series The Man of Steel, the first issue of which featured the first variant cover in comics.

Coming into the comics profession as a penciller, inker, letterer, and writer on his earliest work, Byrne began co-plotting the X-Men comics during his tenure on them, for story arcs including "Dark Phoenix Saga" and "Days of Future Past", and co-creating characters such as Kitty Pryde, Emma Frost, Sabretooth, Shadow King, and Rachel Summers. Byrne launched his writing career in earnest with Fantastic Four, also serving as penciler and inker, and added She-Hulk onto the team while writing a solo series for The Thing. While working on X-Men, he created the Canadian superhero team Alpha Flight, and later wrote and drew their own series.

Moving to DC, Byrne established the modern origin for Superman in The Man of Steel before writing and drawing two monthly titles and various miniseries for the character. Byrne then returned to Marvel, introducing the Great Lakes Avengers, and wrote and drew the humorous fourth wall-breaking series The Sensational She-Hulk. Revisiting X-Men as a writer, Byrne co-created Bishop and Omega Red. Byrne was the writer and artist of the Wonder Woman series for three years, during which he created the second Wonder Girl, Cassie Sandsmark.

During the 1990s he produced a number of creator-owned works, including Next Men and Danger Unlimited, and was one of the founders of the Legend imprint at Dark Horse Comics. He scripted the first issues of Mike Mignola's Hellboy series and produced several Star Trek comics for IDW Publishing. In 2010, Byrne revived Next Men to conclude the series. Hailed as one of the most prolific and influential comic book artists ever, Byrne and his X-Men collaborator Chris Claremont were entered into the Will Eisner Award Hall of Fame in 2015.

== Early life and career ==
Byrne was born on July 6, 1950 in Walsall, Staffordshire and grew up in West Bromwich, also in Staffordshire, where he lived with his parents, Frank and Nelsie, and his maternal grandmother. He was an only child. His father was a town planner and his mother was a homemaker. While living in England, prior to his family emigrating to Canada when John was 8, he was first exposed to American comics, saying in 2005,

[M]y 'journey into comics' began with [star] George Reeves' [Adventures of] Superman series being shown on the BBC in England when I was about 6 years old. Not long after I started watching that series I saw one of the hardcover, black and white 'Annuals' that were being published over there at the time, and soon after found a copy of an Australian reprint called Super Comics that featured a story each of Superboy, Johnny Quick and Batman. The Batman story hooked me for life. A couple of years later my family emigrated to Canada (for the second time, no less!) and I discovered the vast array of American comics available at the time.

John Byrne's first encounter with Marvel Comics was in 1962 with Stan Lee and Jack Kirby's Fantastic Four #5. He later commented that "the book had an 'edge' like nothing DC was putting out at the time". Jack Kirby's work, in particular, had a strong influence on Byrne and he has worked with many of the characters Kirby created or co-created. Besides Kirby, Byrne was influenced by the naturalistic style of Neal Adams. Byrne has named comic books, The Lord of the Rings, and Star Trek: The Original Series as his greatest influences.

Despite drawing comics as a youth, Byrne intended to have a career as a commercial artist. In 1970, he enrolled at the Alberta College of Art and Design in Calgary. He created the superhero parody Gay Guy for the college newspaper, which poked fun at the campus stereotype of homosexuality among art students. Gay Guy is notable for featuring the first gay superhero. While there, he published his first comic book, ACA Comix #1, featuring "The Death's Head Knight".

Byrne left the college in 1973 without graduating. Before finding success with comic books, Byrne spent three years designing billboards for an advertisement company. He broke into comics with a "Fan Art Gallery" piece in Marvel's promotional publication FOOM in early 1974 and by illustrating a two-page story by writer Al Hewetson in Skywald Publications' black-and-white horror magazine Nightmare #20 (Aug. 1974). He then began freelancing for Charlton Comics, making his color-comics debut with the E-Man backup feature "Rog-2000", starring a robot character he'd created in the mid-1970s that colleagues Roger Stern and Bob Layton named and began using for spot illustrations in their fanzine CPL (Contemporary Pictorial Literature). A Rog-2000 story written by Stern, with art by Byrne and Layton, had gotten the attention of Charlton Comics editor Nicola Cuti, who extended Byrne an invitation. Written by Cuti, "Rog-2000" became one of several alternating backup features in the Charlton Comics superhero series E-Man, starting with the eight-page "That Was No Lady" in issue #6 (Jan. 1975). While that was Byrne's first published color-comics work, "My first professional comic book sale was to Marvel, a short story called Dark Asylum' ... which languished in a flat file somewhere until it was used as filler in Giant-Size Dracula #5 [(June 1975)], long after the first Rog story." The story was plotted by Tony Isabella and written by David Anthony Kraft.

After the Rog-2000 story, Byrne went on to work on the Charlton books Wheelie and the Chopper Bunch, Space: 1999, and Emergency!, and co-created with writer Joe Gill the post-apocalyptic science-fiction series Doomsday + 1. Byrne additionally drew a cover for the supernatural anthology The Many Ghosts of Doctor Graves #54 (Dec. 1975).

== Marvel Comics ==
Byrne said he broke into Marvel comics after writer Chris Claremont

...saw [his Charlton] work and began agitating for [him] to draw something he had written. When [artist] Pat Broderick missed a deadline on the 'Iron Fist' series in Marvel Premiere, [production manager] John Verpoorten fired him and offered the book to [Byrne]. ... [Byrne] turned around the first script in time to meet the deadline, and so started getting more work from Marvel, until [he] was able to leave Charlton and focus entirely on the Marvel stuff."

Byrne soon went on to draw series including The Champions (#12–15, 17 1977–78) and Marvel Team-Up (#53–55, 59–70, 75, 79, 100). Byrne first drew the X-Men in Marvel Team-Up #53. For many issues, he was paired with Claremont, with whom he teamed for issue #11 of the black-and-white Marvel magazine Marvel Preview featuring Star-Lord. The Star-Lord story was inked by Terry Austin and lettered by Tom Orzechowski, both of whom soon afterward teamed with Claremont and Byrne on Uncanny X-Men.

=== The Uncanny X-Men ===
The Uncanny X-Men #135 (July 1980); cover art by Byrne and Terry Austin

Byrne joined Claremont beginning with X-Men #108 (Dec. 1977), which was later renamed The Uncanny X-Men with issue #114. Their work together, along with inker Terry Austin, on such classic story arcs as "Proteus", "Dark Phoenix Saga", and "Days of Future Past" would make them both fan favorites. Byrne insisted that the title keep its Canadian character, Wolverine, and contributed a series of story elements to justify Wolverine's presence which eventually made the character among the most popular in Marvel's publishing history. With issue #114, Byrne began co-plotting the series as well as penciling. Claremont recounted that "at that point in time John and I were, in a very real sense, true collaborators on the book. It was with very few exceptions, difficult, for me, anyway, to tell in the actual gestation of the book where one of us left off and the other began – because it involved one of us coming up with an idea and bouncing it off the other ..." The "Dark Phoenix Saga" in 1980 is one of the most notable stories in the title's history. Comics writers and historians Roy Thomas and Peter Sanderson observed that "'The Dark Phoenix Saga' is to Claremont and Byrne what the 'Galactus Trilogy' is to Stan Lee and Jack Kirby. It is a landmark in Marvel history, showcasing its creators' work at the height of their abilities." Byrne has repeatedly compared his working relationship with Claremont to Gilbert and Sullivan, and has said that they were "almost constantly at war over who the characters were." Byrne created the characters Alpha Flight, Proteus, and Kitty Pryde/Shadowcat during his run on The X-Men. A new Brotherhood of Evil Mutants, led by Mystique, was introduced in the "Days of Future Past" storyline (#141–142, Jan.-Feb. 1981) in which a time-travelling Kitty Pryde tried to avert a dystopian future caused by the Brotherhood assassinating Presidential candidate Senator Robert Kelly. Byrne plotted the story because he wanted to depict the Sentinels as a genuine threat to the existence of the mutant race. Byrne left The X-Men with #143 (March 1981). During his tenure on the series, The X-Men was promoted from a bimonthly to a monthly publication schedule as sales steadily increased—a trend that continued long after Byrne left.

In the late 1970s, while serving as the regular penciller of X-Men, Byrne began penciling another superhero team title, The Avengers. Working for the most part with writer David Michelinie, he drew issues #164–166 and 181–191. Byrne and Michelinie co-created Scott Lang in Avengers #181 (March 1979). Byrne's nine-issue run of Captain America, issues #247–255 (July 1980 – March 1981), with writer Roger Stern, included issue #250, in which the character mulled running for the office of President of the United States.

=== Fantastic Four ===
Fantastic Four #232 (July 1981), Byrne's debut as writer-artist; cover art by Byrne and inker Terry Austin

Byrne's post-X-Men body of work at Marvel includes his five-year run on Fantastic Four (#232–295, July 1981 – October 1986), which is generally considered a "second golden age" for the title. Byrne said his goal was to "turn the clock back ... get back and see fresh what it was that made the book great at its inception". He made a number of changes during his tenure: The Thing was temporarily replaced as a member of the quartet by the She-Hulk, while the Thing had adventures in his own comic (#1–22 also written by Byrne), and the Thing's longtime girlfriend Alicia Masters left him for his teammate the Human Torch; the Invisible Girl was developed into the most powerful member with the heightened control of her refined powers and the self-confident assertiveness to use it epitomized by her name change to the Invisible Woman; and headquarters the Baxter Building was destroyed and replaced with Four Freedoms Plaza. Byrne has cited multiple reasons for leaving the series, including "internal office politics" and that "it simply started to get old".

=== Alpha Flight ===
In 1983, while still at the helm of Fantastic Four, Byrne began to write and draw Alpha Flight, starring a Canadian superhero team that had been introduced "merely to survive a fight with the X-Men." The series proved initially very popular, with its first issue selling over half a million copies, and subsequent issues selling between 400,000 and 500,000 issues each month. However, Byrne has said the title "was never much fun" and that he considered the characters two-dimensional. One of Alpha Flight's characters, Northstar, eventually became Marvel's first openly gay superhero. Though Byrne from the beginning intended the character to be gay, Northstar's homosexuality was only hinted at during Byrne's tenure on the series.

=== Indiana Jones ===
In 1983 Byrne co-wrote and penciled issues 1 and 2 of The Further Adventures of Indiana Jones, a two-part story arc titled "The Ikons of Ikammanen". The story involves archaeologist Edith Dunne, a former student-turned-enemy of Jones. Byrne wrote the first issue and Dennis O'Neil wrote the second, while Byrne penciled both issues with Terry Austin as the inker.

=== Incredible Hulk ===
In 1985, after issue #28 of Alpha Flight, Byrne swapped the series with Bill Mantlo, writer of The Incredible Hulk. According to Byrne, he discussed his ideas with editor-in-chief Jim Shooter ahead of time, but once Byrne was on the title, Shooter objected to them. Byrne wrote and drew issues #314–319. The final issue of Byrne's run featured the wedding of Bruce Banner and Betty Ross.

== DC Comics ==
=== The Untold Legend of the Batman ===
In early 1980, Byrne did his first work for DC Comics, penciling the first issue of The Untold Legend of the Batman miniseries. Byrne had always wanted to draw Batman, and had a three-month window of time during which he was not under contract to Marvel. Hearing about the Untold Legend series, Byrne contacted editor Paul Levitz to express interest. DC took him up on his offer, but it was not until the second month of his three-month window that Byrne received the plot for the first issue. Byrne told Levitz that he would not be able to finish the project due to time constraints despite DC then allegedly offering Byrne double his Marvel pay rate, after initially saying they could not match his Marvel rate. Byrne penciled the first issue, which was inked by Jim Aparo after being intended for Terry Austin. This experience soured Byrne on DC for quite some time.

=== Superman ===
Near the end of his time at Marvel, Byrne was hired by DC Comics to revamp its flagship character Superman. This was part of a company-wide restructuring of the history of the DC Universe and all of its characters following the limited series Crisis on Infinite Earths. Byrne's reworking of Superman in particular gained widespread media coverage outside the comic book industry, including articles in Time and The New York Times. At the time, Byrne said, "I'm taking Superman back to the basics ... It's basically Siegel and Shuster's Superman meets the Fleischer Superman in 1986."

The Man of Steel #1 (Oct. 1986); cover art by Byrne

Byrne significantly reduced Superman's powers (though he was still one of the most powerful beings on Earth), eliminated the Fortress of Solitude and super-dog Krypto, and kept Jonathan and Martha Kent alive into Clark's adulthood to enjoy their adopted son's triumphs, as well as to provide him with support, grounding, and advice whenever he needed it. Byrne also used Marv Wolfman's idea of making Lex Luthor a wealthy business owner in addition to a scientific genius with a deadly vendetta against the superhero. Byrne did away with the childhood/teenage career as Superboy; in his revamped history, Clark Kent does not put on a costume and become a super-hero until adulthood. This approach to Kent's path to becoming Superman was later used in the TV series Lois & Clark and Smallville, and in the 2005 novel It's Superman! by Tom De Haven.

In the Superman mythos, Byrne wrote Clark Kent as having a more aggressive and extroverted personality than previously depicted, comparing him to Jimmy Breslin, and even making him a top high-school football player. Byrne came up with explanations for how Superman's disguise works, such as the public simply does not realize that he has a secret identity since he is unmasked, that Superman would vibrate his face via his super speed in order to blur his image to photographers, and having Kent keep a weight training set around to explain how the human and presumably weaker Kent could have a frame as massive as Superman's. Byrne described Superman as becoming a "Super Republican", seeking to incorporate renewed interest in American patriotism during the presidency of Ronald Reagan. Byrne's Superman felt that his deepest roots were on Earth and that his home planet of "Krypton is anathema to him".

The origin and early career of Byrne's version of Superman debuted in the six-issue miniseries The Man of Steel (July–Sept. 1986), the first issue of which was marketed with two different covers illustrated by Byrne, the first use of variant covers by the American comics industry. DC Executive Editor Dick Giordano had been looking for a writer to restart the Superman continuity from scratch, and began talking with Byrne in May 1985 to discuss what Byrne would do with Superman if offered the job. With DC agreeing with 99% of the revision, Byrne was given the go-ahead for what became The Man of Steel.

When DC approached me to submit my proposal for a renovated Superman, the first thing I did was prepare what I called my list of "unreasonable demands". I marked down all the things I felt needed to be pared away, chipped off, and otherwise discarded. All the barnacles which had accumulated on the Legend. I listed all the things I felt needed to be redefined, realigned. The things that needed emphasis. The things best left forgotten. And as my bottom-most unreasonable demand, I asked for the pure ego boost of a new first issue.

— John Byrne, Superman #1, January 1987, Letters Page

Comics historian Timothy Callahan argued that Superman in modern media has more in common with Byrne's portrayal of the character than those of Cary Bates, Elliot S. Maggin, Dennis O'Neil, Jerry Siegel, and Edmond Hamilton. Brian Cronin of Comic Book Resources suggested that, although Byrne made several changes, Byrne's Superman was still more similar to previous depictions of the character than he was not.

Byrne penciled the six-issue DC Universe crossover miniseries Legends (Nov. 1986 – May 1987) during this time. He wrote and drew two monthly Superman titles with the hero's present-day adventures: a new Superman title beginning with issue #1 (January 1987) and Action Comics, in which, beginning with issue #584, Superman teamed up with other DC characters. The original Superman book was renamed The Adventures of Superman starting with issue #424 and was initially written by Marv Wolfman and drawn by Jerry Ordway, but the writing chores were taken over by Byrne after a year from issues #436–442 and 444. As 1988 marked the 50th anniversary year of Superman's creation, Byrne did more Superman-related projects while working on the core Superman monthly titles at the same time: he wrote the prestige format graphic novel, Superman: The Earth Stealers and three separate four-issue miniseries: The World of Krypton, The World of Metropolis, and The World of Smallville. He supplied the cover art for the March 14, 1988, issue of Time magazine and an interior spread featuring Superman, where his pencils were inked by Ordway.

After his initial run on the Superman titles from 1986 to 1988, Byrne would make a return as a guest inker on Adventures of Superman Annual #2 (cover) and Superman #50 in 1990. He would return doing a Superman Elseworlds story as a writer and artist in Action Comics Annual #6 in 1994. In 2004 Superman: True Brit, an Elseworlds story, was a collaboration with former Monty Python member John Cleese and Kim Johnson, with art by Byrne and inker Mark Farmer. Byrne returned to draw Superman in Action Comics #827–835, working with writer Gail Simone, from 2005 to 2006.

Byrne spent about two years on the Superman titles before leaving. His dissatisfaction stemmed from his perception that there was a lack of "conscious support" for him at DC. Furthering the rift between the company and the artist was the fact that the version of Superman which DC licensed for merchandising was contrary to Byrne's representation in the comic books.

== Return to Marvel ==
=== Star Brand ===
In 1986, Marvel began publication of a new line of superhero titles created by then-Editor-in-Chief Jim Shooter, which took place in a continuum removed from the Marvel Universe proper, called the New Universe. In 1987, the New Universe line saw a revamp under new Editor-in-Chief Tom DeFalco, and Byrne took over writing and art breakdowns on the line's flagship title, Star Brand (renamed The Star Brand during Byrne's term on the book). Byrne's run started with issue #11 and continued until the series' cancellation eight issues later upon Marvel's discontinuation of the New Universe line.

=== Avengers West Coast ===
In 1989, after leaving Superman, Byrne returned to work on a number of titles for Marvel Comics. His work on West Coast Avengers (issues #42–57, soon renamed Avengers West Coast) was contingent on his being allowed to do what he called "my Vision story". The Vision was a long-standing Marvel superhero and member of The Avengers, an android originally created by the villain Ultron and constructed with the body of the original Human Torch. The Vision went on to join the team, marry his teammate the Scarlet Witch, and father two children by her. Byrne radically changed this, revealing that Immortus – who previously had revealed to the Avengers the synthezoid's origin – lied about the Vision's creation. The android Human Torch was found and joined the WCA. The Vision was disassembled and stripped of his emotions. The couple's twins were revealed to be pieces of the soul of the demon Mephisto. In addition to these changes, Byrne's run is remembered for the introduction of the Great Lakes Avengers, an eclectic group of new superheroes.

=== The Sensational She-Hulk ===
During She-Hulk's tenure with the Fantastic Four, she appeared in Marvel Graphic Novel #18 (Nov. 1985) in a story titled The Sensational She-Hulk, which Byrne wrote and illustrated.

The Sensational She-Hulk #31 (Sept. 1991), Byrne with She-Hulk and editor Renée Witterstaetter; cover art by Byrne

On the request of editor Mark Gruenwald, Byrne wrote and drew a new series in 1989, The Sensational She-Hulk (maintaining the 1985 graphic novel's title). Gruenwald directed that it be significantly different from the character's previous series, The Savage She-Hulk. Byrne's take was comedic and the She-Hulk, who was aware she was in a comic book, regularly broke the fourth wall, developing a love-hate relationship with her artist/writer by criticizing his storylines, drawing style, character development, etc. Byrne left the book after writing and drawing the first eight issues. Byrne was asked for input on writer Dwayne McDuffie's She-Hulk: Ceremony limited series, and according to Byrne, most of his objections to the story and notations of errors were ignored, and his editor, Bobbie Chase, "was rewriting my stuff to bring it into line with" the story in Ceremony. Upon complaining to DeFalco, Byrne says he was fired from his series. He later returned to write and draw issues #31–50 under new editor Renée Witterstaetter.

In 2020, Marvel Comics announced a collected omnibus edition of Byrne's Sensational She-Hulk run featuring a digitally-recolored cover. Following negative fan feedback highlighted during a livestream by comics commentator Omar Valdivieso on his channel Near Mint Condition, Byrne personally contacted Marvel to request that the original coloring be restored for the final publication.

=== Namor, the Sub-Mariner ===
Byrne started a new series, Namor, the Sub-Mariner in April 1990. Byrne's take on the undersea antihero Namor cast him as the head of a surface company, Oracle, Inc., in order to help keep the ocean unpolluted, and had Namor involved in corporate intrigue. After writing and drawing the book for 25 issues, Byrne told editor Terry Kavanagh that he was starting to feel constrained on the book and thought having a different artist might inspire him to a fresh approach. Kavanagh suggested newcomer Jae Lee, and Byrne continued strictly as the writer of the book up through issue #32. Byrne later said he has great fondness for the title character and was unhappy that circumstances forced him to leave the series.

=== Iron Man ===
Byrne took over writing Iron Man for issues #258–277 (July 1990-Feb. 1992), drawn by John Romita Jr. and later by Paul Ryan. Byrne launched a second "Armor Wars" story arc, restored the Mandarin as a major Iron Man nemesis, and featured the 1950s "pre-superhero Marvel" monster Fin Fang Foom. During the course of his run, Byrne became the first writer to retcon Iron Man's origin, removing explicit ties to the Vietnam War (while maintaining a Southeast Asia setting), and linking Wong-Chu, the man who captured Tony Stark, to the Mandarin.

== Creator-owned works ==
In the early 1990s, Byrne began creating a series of original, creator-owned works for publisher Dark Horse Comics. This was during a general trend in the industry for established creators working for Marvel and DC to bring their original works to other publishers or create their own companies to publish the works themselves (one prominent example is Image Comics). A number of these creators, including Byrne, Frank Miller, Mike Mignola, and Art Adams, banded together to form the Legend imprint at Dark Horse.

Byrne's first title for Dark Horse was Next Men, a work he considered darker and more realistic than his previous work. The Next Men were five young people who were the product of a secret government experiment. Byrne said, "I thought I would see what I could do with superheroes in the 'real world' " and "[e]xplore the impact their existence would have." Byrne's other Dark Horse titles were Babe, and Danger Unlimited, an all-age readers book about a team of heroes in the future fighting an alien occupation of Earth.

The Next Men lasted until issue 30 in 1994, when Byrne ended the series, intending to return "in no more than six months." Byrne says he "did not count on...the virtual collapse of the whole comic book industry, which seemed to occur at just the time I put Next Men on the shelf... In the present, very depressed marketplace, I don't feel Next Men would have much chance, so I leave the book hibernating until such time as the market improves." IDW Publishing revived John Byrne's Next Men in 2010 after a series of trade paperbacks which collected the first series together. The original storyline that had a cliffhanger ending in 1995 was continued.

== Later career ==
In later years, Byrne has worked on titles for Marvel, DC, and other publishers, including the 1992 prestige format graphic novel Green Lantern: Ganthet's Tale with science fiction author Larry Niven at DC. In 1989, Byrne wrote Batman #433–435 (May–July 1989) and in 1990, produced a 3-D graphic novel with 3-D effects by Ray Zone. He returned to the X-Men franchise at Marvel from 1991 to 1992, succeeding longtime writer Chris Claremont, who left after 17 years working on the various X-Men related titles. Byrne's return as the new writer was brief, as he only scripted Uncanny X-Men issues #281–285 and 288 with artist Whilce Portacio, and X-Men issues #4–5 with artist Jim Lee. In 1995, Byrne wrote and drew the Marvel/DC intercompany crossover Darkseid vs. Galactus: The Hunger, which also featured the Jack Kirby creations the Silver Surfer and the New Gods. In 1996, another Marvel/DC intercompany crossover - Batman/Captain America, one shot homage to Golden Age versions of both heroes.

He wrote and drew another of DC's signature series, the long-running Wonder Woman, from 1995 to 1998. During that time, he elevated the super-heroine to the status of a goddess who then ascended to Mount Olympus as the Goddess of Truth, and created Cassie Sandsmark, the new Wonder Girl. Byrne then spotlighted supporting characters such as Queen Hippolyta in their own adventures but restored the series' status quo in his last issue. He additionally took over New Gods vol. 4 at the end of 1996, as writer-artist of issues #12–15, continuing with it as the series was rebooted with a new #1 as Jack Kirby's Fourth World. That ran 20 issues from 1997 to 1998. During his tenure on the New Gods, Byrne was writer of the four-issue miniseries crossover Genesis, a storyline published weekly by DC Comics in August 1997. The series was drawn by Ron Wagner and Joe Rubinstein. Byrne wrote a Wonder Woman prose novel, Wonder Woman: Gods and Goddesses (1997).

Spider-Man: Chapter One #1 (Dec. 1998); cover art by Byrne, a homage to the cover for Amazing Fantasy #15 (Aug. 1962), which was the first appearance of Spider-Man

In the series Spider-Man: Chapter One, Byrne retold some of Spider-Man's earliest adventures, changing some key aspects. In late 1998, Byrne became writer of the flagship series The Amazing Spider-Man at the end of the series with issue #440, by which time Marvel had decided to relaunch the book. The "last" issue of The Amazing Spider-Man was #441 (November 1998), with Marvel re-initiating the series with a new volume 2, issue #1 (Jan. 1999) with Howard Mackie as writer and Byrne on pencils. Byrne penciled issues #1–18 (from 1999 to 2000) and wrote #13–14. In 1999, Byrne, working with artist Ron Garney, wrote the first seven issues of a new Hulk series, as well as the summer annual.

From 1999 to 2001, Byrne returned to the X-Men to write and draw X-Men: The Hidden Years which ran for 22 issues. Byrne explained the title's cancellation by saying, "I was officially informed yesterday that, despite the fact that they are still profitable, several 'redundant' X-Titles are being axed." This disagreement factored in his decision to no longer work for Marvel Comics.

Like X-Men: The Hidden Years, some other works of this period involved characters and events in time periods other than the present and, in some cases, considered "skipped over" (Marvel: The Lost Generation), or alternate timelines (DC's Superman & Batman: Generations); a feature some of these have in common is to have characters who actually age during the course of the series, which is uncommon for characters in ongoing comics. In early 2003, Byrne spent ten weeks as a guest penciler on the syndicated newspaper strip Funky Winkerbean. Byrne did this as a favor for Winkerbean's creator, Tom Batiuk, who was recovering from foot surgery. He would later become the final person to draw Funky Winkerbean, taking over illustration duties from artist Chuck Ayers for the strip's concluding week, ending on December 31, 2022.

Most of his work in the first decade of the new millennium was for DC Comics: JLA (issues #94–99 in 2004, co-writing and illustrating the "Tenth Circle" story arc, reuniting with his Uncanny X-Men writer Chris Claremont and with Jerry Ordway as inker), Doom Patrol, Blood of the Demon, a five-issue arc of JLA Classified. He penciled an issue of Hawkman (vol. 4) #26 in May 2004. Superman: True Brit was a collaboration with former Monty Python member John Cleese and Kim Johnson, with art by Byrne and inker Mark Farmer. Byrne returned to draw Superman in Action Comics #827–835, working with writer Gail Simone, from 2005 to 2006. Afterward, Simone and Byrne reteamed to launch The All-New Atom series in 2006, with Byrne pencilling the first three issues.

For publisher IDW, Byrne worked on the superhero series FX #1–6, written by Wayne Osborne, starting with the March 2008 issue. His other projects for the publisher include stories for the Star Trek and Angel franchises. Byrne's Star Trek work included the final issue of the miniseries Star Trek: Alien Spotlight (February 2008); Star Trek: Assignment: Earth #1–5; Star Trek: Romulans #1–2, Star Trek: Crew (a Christopher Pike-era comic book focusing on the character of "Number One") started in March 2009; the final chapter of his Romulans story, a four-issue miniseries, Star Trek: Leonard McCoy, Frontier Doctor, set before Star Trek: The Motion Picture, and the second Assignment: Earth series. His work on Angel included Angel: Blood and Trenches (set during World War I); an Angel vs Frankenstein one-shot; and an Andy Hallett tribute, Angel: Music of the Spheres and Angel vs Frankenstein II in 2008, 2009 and 2010 respectively.

In 2011, he worked on Jurassic Park: The Devils in the Desert, and Cold War (The Michael Swann Dossier). He revived his Next Men series in 2010–2011, with the sequel series Aftermath. Other work for IDW includes the 2012 miniseries Trio and the 2013 miniseries The High Ways and Doomsday.1. In 2018, Byrne began X-Men Elsewhen, a fan-fiction comic book exploring how he would've continued the story of the X-Men after "The Dark Phoenix Saga". The series, written and pencilled by Byrne and published on his website, has 32 issues as of December 2022. During San Diego Comic-Con 2025, it was announced that Abrams ComicArts' Marvel line would publish X-Men Elsewhen as a series of hardcovers beginning in June 2026.

== Controversies ==
Over the years, Byrne has gained a reputation as a controversial figure within the community of comic book pros and fans. He has himself noted that "as the people who have figured me out have said, I just don't suffer fools gladly." Gail Simone, who worked with Byrne on The All New Atom in 2006, described Byrne as "very opinionated; a lot of artists are opinionated, and I'm okay with that. Actually, I think John Byrne is brilliant and his forceful personality is part of that."

=== Creator ownership ===
In 1981, Jack Kirby began speaking publicly about his belief that he had been deprived of fair credit and money while creating the majority of Marvel's top characters. Byrne wrote an editorial declaring himself "proud" to be a "company man", and arguing that all creators should "live within the rules while they're around." Steve Gerber and Kirby lampooned Byrne's position in Destroyer Duck, drawing him as a character called Booster Cogburn, possessing no genitals, a removable spine, and existing only to serve as a cog in the mammoth corporation that owned him. Byrne later made a story in Action Comics #592–593 where Big Barda (who is based on Kirby's wife Roz) is brainwashed and almost forced to make a pornographic video with Superman. Erik Larsen created a villain in the 1990s for his Savage Dragon and the Freak Force series, Johnny Redbeard / the Creator, who is a parody of Byrne; a massive cranium with atrophied appendages, he can bestow superpowers indiscriminately.

Regarding the ownership rights for Superman, Byrne has stated: "And I've always been terribly pragmatic about that kind of stuff. This is where my low BS threshold touched on in the sense that I looked at the story of Siegel and Shuster, for example, and I said, well, that's kind of sad that they created this huge, iconic character and didn't make a hundred bajillion dollars for it. But that's also what the situation was; that was the deal. And everybody understood that was the deal. They weren't cheated. They knew what it was going in." In a 2006 interview, Byrne further elaborated on his creator's rights views:

I feel myself to be a company man. When the company is worth supporting, I'll support the company. If the company's honest with me up front, I support the company. I see no reason not to. And I was always campaigning for creator's rights. I was always out there saying, yeah, it would be a good idea if things changed. But too many of my contemporaries—I'm not going to name names here—but too many of my contemporaries sort of had the attitude of, "Well, I know that this is the way the industry has always been run, but surely that doesn't apply to me." And I would say, "Well, yes, it does. It applies to everybody. So we're going to have to change the rules for everybody, not just say 'Well, this shouldn't apply to me because I'm so special.'"

=== Other comments ===
In 1982, during a panel discussion at the Dallas Fantasy Fair, Byrne made disparaging comments about longtime comics writer and one-time Marvel Comics editor-in-chief Roy Thomas that were published in The Comics Journal #75 (Sept. 1982). Thomas threatened a slander suit if Byrne did not apologize. In a letter printed in The Comics Journal #82 (July 1983), Byrne retracted his statements, saying he was only repeating information from others, writing, "I acted only in the office of a parrot."

In 2005, while criticizing portrayals of Superman emphasizing his connection to his home planet, Byrne described immigrants with excessive attachment to their nations of origin as "ungrateful little shits." Similar views were earlier expressed in Byrne's The Man of Steel (1986), in which Superman was not considered born until after his Kryptonian artificial matrix opened after landing in Kansas, thus making him an American citizen by birth. The miniseries ends with Superman declaring, "Krypton bred me, but it was Earth that gave me all I am. All that matters."

In 2015, Byrne received criticism for stating that transgender people are mentally ill and comparing them to pedophiles while discussing Caitlyn Jenner. Byrne stated: "How will we feel about all those people who, instead of actually helping them, we encouraged in a program of self-mutilation?"

== Art style ==
Byrne has himself called his style a "collection of influences". He cites Neal Adams, Jack Kirby, John Buscema, and Steve Ditko as primary influences on his style, but continues to pick up on ideas that he sees and likes while constantly changing his tools and methods. Byrne is color blind for a narrow range of green and brown tones. During the first year that Byrne illustrated Iron Fist, he believed that the protagonist's costume was brown. While he experimented with his own hand-drawn lettering in the early 1980s, he developed computer fonts for his work in the 1990s, one in particular based on the handwriting of the letterer Jack Morelli.

== Personal life ==
Byrne became a naturalized American citizen in 1988. He was previously a citizen of the UK and Canada, but no longer holds citizenship for those countries, though remaining proud of his English heritage. He was married to photographer and actress Andrea Braun Byrne until divorcing. They met at a convention in Chicago. Braun's son from a previous marriage is fellow professional comic book artist Kieron Dwyer, and Byrne became Dwyer's stepfather when the boy was 13 until Byrne divorced his mother. They only lived together for a short time as the young Dwyer soon moved to Los Angeles to live with his father. Byrne encouraged Dwyer's aspirations to be a cartoonist and assisted in landing Dwyer's first professional job drawing Batman #413 (Nov. 1987).

Byrne says that his political views are center-right, "There's a political party—or used to be—up in Canada called the Progressive Conservatives. And I always liked the sound of that name. I liked what that imparted, that sort of 'let us go forward carefully' notion. So that's sort of how I've always thought of myself, as a progressive conservative." Byrne has never done drugs other than alcohol.

Since 2015, Byrne no longer attends any conventions regularly and makes rare public appearances. He made an appearance at the 2018 Fan Expo Boston, where he spoke at two events, both titled "Spotlight on John Byrne" on August 11 and 12, and an autograph signing with William Shatner.

== Awards ==
Byrne received the Favourite Comic Book Artist Eagle Awards in 1978 and 1979, and a 1980 Inkpot Award. In 2008, he was inducted into the Canadian Comic Book Creator Hall of Fame. In 2015, Byrne was inducted into the Will Eisner Hall of Fame, alongside judges' choices Marge (Marjorie Henderson Buell) and Bill Woggon and elected inductees Chris Claremont, Denis Kitchen, and Frank Miller.

== Selected bibliography ==
=== Comic books ===
==== Charlton Comics ====
- Beetle Bailey #112–113 (artist, text story two pages, 1975)
- Doomsday + 1 #1–6 (artist, 1975–1976)
- E-Man #6–7, 9–10 (artist, Rog-2000 backup stories, 1975)
- Emergency! #1–2 (artist, 1976)
- The Flintstones #37, 42 (artist, text story two pages, 1975)
- Korg: 70,000 B.C. #2 (artist, text story two pages, 1975)
- Space: 1999 #3–6 (artist, 1976)
- Valley of the Dinosaurs #3 (artist, text story two pages, 1975)
- Wheelie and the Chopper Bunch #1–3 (artist, 1975)

==== Dark Horse Comics ====
- John Byrne's 2112 (1991)
- Danger Unlimited (1994)
- John Byrne's Next Men #0, #1–30 (1992–1994)
- Babe (1994)
- Hellboy: Seed of Destruction #1–4 (1994)
- Babe 2 (1995)

==== DC Comics ====
- Action Comics #584–600 (writer/artist, 1987–1988), #827–835 (artist, 2005–2006); Annual #1 (writer, 1987), Annual #6 (writer/artist, 1994)
- Adventures of Superman #426 (with Marv Wolfman and Jerry Ordway), 436–442 (436–437 with Jerry Ordway), 444 (writer, 1987–1988); Annual #2 (inker, 1990)
- All New Atom #1–3 (artist, 2006)
- Batman #400 (artist, one page, 1986), #433–435 (writer and cover artist, 1989)
- Batman 3D graphic novel (writer-artist, 1990)
- Batman/Captain America (one shot intercompany crossover, published by DC, writer/artist, 1997)
- Darkseid/Galactus (one shot intercompany crossover, published by DC, writer/artist, 1995)
- Blood of the Demon #1–17 (writer/artist, 2005–2006)
- Doom Patrol vol. 4 #1–18 (writer/artist, 2004–2006)
- Genesis #1–4 (miniseries, writer, 1997)
- Green Lantern Annual #3 (writer/penciler, 1987)
- Green Lantern: Ganthet's Tale (one-shot; scripter/artist, from a story by Larry Niven, 1992)
- Hawkman vol. 4 #26 (artist, 2004)
- Jack Kirby's Fourth World #1–20 (writer/artist, 1997–1998)
- JLA #94–99 (writer with Chris Claremont/artist, 2004)
- JLA: Classified #50–54 (artist, 2008)
- Judge Dredd: Legends of the Law #8–10 (writer, 1995)
- Lab Rats #1–8 (writer/artist, 2002–2003)
- Legends #1–6 (miniseries, artist, 1986–1987)
- The Man of Steel #1–6 (miniseries, writer/artist, 1986)
- New Gods vol. 4 #12–15 (writer/artist, 1996–1997)
- New Teen Titans Annual vol. 2 #2 (penciler, 1986)
- OMAC vol. 2 #1–4 (miniseries, 1991–1992)
- Secret Origins Annual vol. 2 #1 (artist, Doom Patrol, 1987)
- Superman #400 (artist, one page, 1984)
- Superman vol. 2 #1–22 (writer/artist, writer only #18, 1987–1988); #50 (artist, 1990), Annual #1 (writer, 1987), Annual #2 (writer/artist of the second story, 1988)
- Superman: The Earth Stealers #1 (writer, 1988)
- Superman & Batman: Generations #1–4 (miniseries, writer/artist, 1999)
- Superman & Batman: Generations 2 #1–4 (miniseries, writer/artist, 2001)
- Superman & Batman: Generations 3 #1–12 (miniseries, writer/artist, 2003–2004)
- Superman: True Brit graphic novel (artist, 2004)
- Superman Forever #1 (artist, 1998)
- Untold Legend of The Batman #1 (miniseries, artist, 1980)
- World of Krypton #1–4 (miniseries, writer and cover artist, 1987–1988)
- World of Metropolis #1–4 (miniseries, writer and cover artist, 1988)
- World of Smallville #1–4 (miniseries, writer and cover artist, 1988)
- Wonder Woman vol. 2 #101–136, Annual #5–6 (writer/artist, 1995–1998)

==== Fleetway Publications ====
- 2000 AD Si-Fi Special 1983 (artist, 1983)

==== IDW Publishing ====
- Angel: After the Fall #6 (artist)
- Angel: Blood & Trenches #1–4 (writer/artist, 2009)
- Cold War #1–4 (writer/artist, 2011–2012)
- Doomsday.1 #1–4 (writer/artist, 2013)
- FX #1–6 (artist, 2008)
- The High Ways #1–4 (writer/artist, 2012–2013)
- John Byrne's Next Men vol. 2 #1–9, 40–44 (writer/artist, 1992–2012)
- Jurassic Park: The Devils in the Desert #1–4 (writer/artist, 2011)
- Star Trek Romulans: Hollow Crown #1–2 (writer/artist, 2008)
- Star Trek Romulans: Schism #1–3 (writer/artist, 2009)
- Star Trek: Alien Spotlight: Romulans #1–3 (writer/artist, 2008)
- Star Trek: Assignment: Earth #1–2 (writer/artist, 2008)
- Star Trek: Crew #1–5 (writer/artist, 2009)
- Star Trek: Leonard McCoy, Frontier Doctor #1–4 (writer/artist, 2010)
- Star Trek: "Strange New Worlds" (photonovel, 2013)
- Star Trek: New Visions #1–19 (photonovels, 2014–2018)
- Star Trek: New Visions vol. #1–4 (photonovels collected with some new material)
- Trio #1–4 (writer/artist, 2012)
- Triple Helix #1–4 (writer/artist, 2013–2014)

==== Marvel Comics ====
- Alpha Flight #1–28 (writer/penciller, 1983–1985)
- The Amazing Spider-Man #189, 190, 206 Annual #13 (penciller, 1979–1980); 440–441 (writer, 1998)
- The Amazing Spider-Man vol. 2 #1–18 (penciller, 1999–2000); #13–14 (writer, 2000)
- The Avengers #164–166, 181–191, 233 (penciller, 1977–1983); #305–317 (writer, 1989–1990); Annual #13 (inker, 1984), #14 (penciler, 1985), #18 (writer, 1989)
- Avengers West Coast #42–57, Annual #4 (writer/penciller, 1989–1990)
- Captain America #247–255 (penciller, 1980–1981)
- The Champions #12–15 (penciller, 1977), #17 (inker, 1978)
- Daredevil #138 (penciller, 1976)
- Epic Illustrated (Galactus) #26–34 (writer/artist, 1984–1986)
- Fantastic Four #209–218 (artist, 1979–1980); #220-221, 232–293 (writer/artist, 1980–1986); #294, Annual #17–19 (writer, 1983–1985)
- The Further Adventures of Indiana Jones #1 (writer/penciller, 1983), #2 (penciller, 1983)
- Giant-Size Dracula #5 (penciller, 1975)
- Hulk #1–7, Annual #1 (writer, 1999)
- Iron Fist #1–15 (penciller, 1975–1977)
- Iron Man #118 (penciler, 1979); #258–277 (writer, 1990–1992); Annual #10 (artist, 1989)
- The Incredible Hulk #314–319 (writer/artist, 1985–1986); Annual #7 (penciller, 1978); Annual #8, 14 (writer, 1979–1985)
- Marvel Comics Presents #18 (She-Hulk story), #79 (Sunspot story) (writer/artist, 1989–1991)
- Marvel Fanfare #29 (writer/artist, 1986)
- Marvel Graphic Novel #8 (writer, 1983), #18 (writer/artist, 1985)
- Marvel Premiere #25, #47–48 (artist, 1975–1979)
- Marvel Preview #11 (artist, 1977)
- Marvel Team-Up #53–55, 59–70, 75, 79, 100 (second half of issue) (artist, 1977–1980)
- Marvel: The Lost Generation #1–12 (artist, 2000–2001)
- Marvel Two-in-One #43, 53–55 (artist, 1978–1979); #50 (writer/artist, 1979); #100 (writer, 1983)
- Namor the Sub-Mariner #1–25 (writer/artist, 1990–1992); #26–32 (writer, 1992)
- The New Mutants #75 (penciller, 1989)
- Peter Parker The Spectacular Spider-Man #58 (penciller, 1981)
- Power Man #48–49 (penciller, 1977–1978)
- Power Man and Iron Fist #50 (penciller, 1978)
- Rom #74 (inker, 1986)
- Sensational She-Hulk #1–8, 31–46, 48–50 (writer/artist, 1989–1993)
- Spider-Man: Chapter One #1–6, 0, 7–12 (writer/artist, 1998–1999)
- Thing #1–13, 19–22 (writer, 1983–1985)
- Uncanny X-Men #108, 109, 111–143 (co-plotter and penciller, 1977–1981); #273, 281–285, 288 (scripter, 1991–1992)
- What If #36 (writer/artist, 1982)
- Wolverine vol. 2 #17–23 (artist, 1989–1990)
- X-Factor Annual #4 (writer/penciller, 1989)
- X-Men vol. 2 #4–5 (writer, 1992)
- X-Men: The Hidden Years #1–22 (writer/artist, 1999–2001)

=== Novels ===
- John L. Byrne's Fear Book (1988; ISBN 0-446-34814-7)
- Whipping Boy (1992; ISBN 0-440-21171-9)
- Wonder Woman: Gods and Goddesses (1997, ISBN 0-7615-0483-4)

=== Newspaper strips ===
- Funky Winkerbean (fill-in penciler for ten weeks, 2003; guest artist, December 26–31, 2022)

=== Portfolios ===
- History of the DC Universe (1986, includes one plate by Byrne).
- Superman #400 (1984, includes one plate by Byrne)

=== Webcomics ===
- You Go, Ghoul! (2004)
- X-Men Elsewhen #1–32 (2019–2022)

== Sources ==
- Cooke, Jon B.; Nolen-Weathington, Eric (2006). Modern Masters Volume 7: John Byrne. Raleigh, North Carolina: TwoMorrows Publishing. ISBN 1-893905-56-X.

Preceded by Sal Buscema	Marvel Team-Up artist 1977–1978	Succeeded by David Wenzel
Preceded by Dave Cockrum	Uncanny X-Men artist 1977–1981	Succeeded by Dave Cockrum
Preceded by Jim Mooney	The Avengers artist 1979–1980	Succeeded by Arvell Jones
Preceded by Sal Buscema	Fantastic Four artist 1979–1980	Succeeded by Bill Sienkiewicz
Preceded by Roger McKenzie	Captain America writer 1980 (with Roger Stern)	Succeeded by Bill Mantlo
Preceded by Doug Moench (writer); Bill Sienkiewicz(artist)	Fantastic Four writer and artist 1981–1986	Succeeded by Roger Stern (writer); Jerry Ordway(artist)
Preceded by n/a	Alpha Flight writer and artist 1983–1985	Succeeded by Bill Mantlo (writer); Mike Mignola (artist)
Preceded by Bill Mantlo (writer), Mike Mignola (artist)	The Incredible Hulk writer and artist 1985–1986	Succeeded by Al Milgrom
Preceded by Alan Moore (writer), Curt Swan (penciller)	Action Comics writer and artist 1987–1988	Succeeded by multiple
Preceded by n/a	Superman vol. 2 writer and artist 1987–1988	Succeeded by Roger Stern (writer), Mike Mignola (artist)
Preceded by Marv Wolfman	The Adventures of Superman co-writer (with Jerry Ordway); 1988	Succeeded by Jerry Ordway
Preceded by Tom DeFalco and Ralph Macchio (writers); Tom Morgan (artist)	West Coast Avengers/ Avengers West Coast writer and artist 1989–1990	Succeeded by Fabian Nicieza (writer); Tom Morgan (artist)
Preceded by Ralph Macchio	The Avengers writer 1989–1990	Succeeded by Fabian Nicieza
Preceded by n/a	Namor the Sub-Mariner writer and artist 1990–1992 as writer; 1990–1991 as artist	Succeeded by Bob Harras (writer); Jae Lee (artist)
Preceded by Dwayne McDuffie	Iron Man writer 1990–1992	Succeeded by Len Kaminski
Preceded by Chris Claremont	Uncanny X-Men writer 1991–1992	Succeeded by Scott Lobdell
Preceded by Louise Simonson (writer), Tom Morgan (penciller)	The Sensational She-Hulk writer and artist 1991–1993	Succeeded by Scott Benson (writer), Tom Morgan (penciller)
Preceded by Chris Claremont	X-Men (vol. 2) writer 1992	Succeeded by Jim Lee
Preceded by William Messner-Loebs	Wonder Woman writer 1995–1998	Succeeded by Eric Luke
Preceded by n/a	The Amazing Spider-Man vol. 2 artist 1999–2000	Succeeded by John Romita, Jr.
Preceded by Joe Casey	The Incredible Hulk writer 1999	Succeeded by Paul Jenkins
Preceded by Roy Thomas; Dann Thomas	Spider-Woman writer 1999–2000	Succeeded by Brian Michael Bendis
