= Hellboy: The Storm and the Fury =

Twelfth collected edition of Hellboy comic series

Publication information
- Publisher: Dark Horse Comics
- Format: Limited series
- Genre: Horror

Creative team
- Created by: Mike Mignola
- Written by: Mike Mignola
- Artist: Duncan Fegredo
- Letterer: Clem Robins
- Colorist: Dave Stewart
- Editor: Scott Allie

Collected editions
- Hellboy: The Storm and the Fury: ISBN 978-1-59582-827-9

Hellboy: The Storm and the Fury is the twelfth collected edition in Mike Mignola's Hellboy comic book series, the third of three connected story arcs written by Mignola and illustrated by Duncan Fegredo. It collects Hellboy: The Storm #1-3 and Hellboy: The Fury #1-3, with the partition into two limited series (series whose actions are set minutes apart from each other) intended to accommodate an anticipated production gap of several months that eventually saw the story's first three issues published between July through September 2010 and its last three between May through August 2011. This is the concluding story arc of a trilogy beginning with Darkness Calls and continuing with The Wild Hunt, all of them written by Mignola and illustrated by Fegredo. The six issues were numbered on their inside front covers as issues 47-49 and 55-57 of the continuing Hellboy series. Two prelude pages from The Fury #3 are absent in this trade paperback.

As with Hellboy stories generally and these issues in particular, the collected edition was published by Dark Horse Comics. Parts of the story arc were adapted for the 2019 Hellboy reboot directed by Neil Marshall.

== Summary ==
Hellboy and Alice Monaghan visit the church of an English parish priest named Bill, confirming that Hellboy's promised army of "the noble dead of Britain" are raising from their graves. They watch Bill showing three empty stone caskets to a puzzled police officer; Hellboy hears the occupant of a fourth, undisturbed, tomb (reputed that of a traitor) begging Hellboy's pardon as England's king. Bill had seen the other three knights leaving. Hellboy thanks Bill but decides not to tell him of the upcoming war ("Bad enough you and I have to know that"). Hellboy has quit drinking and rejects Bill's invitation to join him at the pub, complaining to Alice of the role alcohol has played in his trials since departing from the BPRD. Hellboy and Alice leave the town in a "crappy rental car" with Excalibur in the back seat wrapped in a towel. As they drive they comment on the ill omen of a tall bell-ringing homeless man standing by the road with a "The End is Nigh" placard, and they discuss the problem of where Hellboy is to meet the army of reanimated British knights that according to Morgan le Fay he must lead against Nimue's army. They are surprised by a giant beast warrior elaborately helmeted and armored in some copper-colored metal, wielding a large spear and running at them down the road. The warrior punches their car off the road and down a wooded slope. After frantically checking that she is unhurt, Hellboy leaves Alice in the upended car to fight the warrior who while fighting announces himself as Nimue's champion, the Blood Queen having recently murdered Queen Mab and Dagda's elf retainer.

Meanwhile, Gruagach flees the growing storm elsewhere in the countryside and trips over the grave of Merlin, whose image he begs for mercy, eliciting the reply, "No mercy for you, pig." Merlin recounts his seduction and entombment by Nimue, and denounces Gruagach for helping her to end the world. He reveals that Nimue killed Mab in order to create the champion who is now fighting Hellboy and is revealed to be her hedgehog servant from The Wild Hunt transformed by a daubing in Mab's golden blood. Merlin shows Gruagach a post-apocalyptic future vision of the Ogdru Hem treading ruined cities, and curses him with eternal life "until the world ceases to turn" that he may see the world he helped create come to pass.

Back in the darkened church the undisturbed fourth tomb still begs forgiveness as a crowned knight, resembling King Arthur as portrayed in The Wild Hunt, appears to Bill who falls to his knees in prayer. Alice throws Excalibur to Hellboy who, distracted, is impaled on the spear of Nimue's champion but merely walks up the spear to deliver a sweeping death blow with the sword. Dying, the champion warns Hellboy of a secret (which he has learned from Mab through her blood) that Nimue is becoming "a thing not seen since the beginning of the world." Once he reverts, dead, to his hedgehog form, Hellboy follows the sword which has flown some yards away in its final swing, and is led to discover an unusually picturesque and isolated pub with an image of the Holy Grail on its sign. Hellboy and Alice are forced to enter the pub, the woman tending bar seemingly unfazed by Hellboy's appearance but only claims to find him familiar. Hellboy nurses his tea watching a TV news report with BPRD's Kate Corrigan giving a statement on the towering California Urgo Hem from BPRD: King of Fear (and subsequent issues), as he sorrowfully relives a conversation from his childhood on the New Mexico military base in 1947, when his adoptive father Trevor Bruttenholm assured him that he was not, as he feared even in youth, a monster. The barkeep turns off her TV as Alice calls Hellboy to the window, to witness, dismayed, his undead army of knights who have arrived and silently ring the pub awaiting him.

Sitting with Alice by the window, Hellboy explains he cannot lead the undead army out of distrust towards Morgan despite trusting Mab's intentions. He also refuses to take Excalibur and asks Alice to get rid of it for him, intending to rejoin the BPRD in America once he defeated Nimue before leaving to face her. Along was way, Hellboy shortly finds Gruagach attempting to hang himself and obliges the remorseful changeling's plea to be killed. Hellboy immediately comes upon the bell-ringing homeless man, who he seems to recognize and greets with a disgusted "Oh, it's you." Unperturbed, the man shows Hellboy a vision of the vast army surrounding and defending Nimue's tower and urges Hellboy to defeat it at the head of an army led out of Hell - at which Hellboy breaks the man's walking stick over his head so that he reveals himself as Astaroth, Hellboy's tempter from the Box Full of Evil and The Wild Hunt storylines, who departs (the two broken pieces of his staff-like snake companion having rejoined). As Hellboy relights his cigar, Baba Yaga appears leaning on the giant wooden pestle of her flying mortar, and offers to fly Hellboy over the vast army so he may confront Nimue alone in her tower, begging him humbly in return for what she had previously always demanded: one of his eyes. Hellboy plucks it out and she brandishes it, rejoicing. Elsewhere, Morgan reviews her chessboard, the red piece of which is now bleeding, and in the top chamber of Nimue's tower, Nimue prays to the Ogdru Jahad until Ganeida, her mangled witch courtier from The Wild Hunt, interrupts her to announce that the Ogdru Jahad are using Nimue's body as vessel to incarnate themselves. As a horrified Nimue tosses Ganeida's body around the room with a suddenly mutating and gigantic arm, and as her army outside chants for war, we see the stones of the Ogdru Jahad's prison superimposed in the sky around the tower.

The three witches from Darkness Calls, having fled the unfolding scene in Nimue's chamber, stand outside her tower and debate their responsibility for the cataclysm that is underway. They witness Hellboy approaching their position at base of the tower and mistake him for Odin and then for Thor because of his hammer-like stone hand and his missing eye. They direct him up to the top chamber from whose window (onto the spears of her soldiers) Nimue tosses Ganeida in an enraged denial of her ongoing transformation.

As Hellboy fights his way up the tower, Alice grieves back in the pub when the barkeep reminds her of what King Arthur told her in Morgan's castle - that Alice's life is bound to Excalibur and that she would be the first to see the new king with his crown. The barkeep tells Alice that the pub belongs to George Washbook (grand-nephew of two traitorous Victorian witches repeatedly referenced in Sir Edward Grey: Witchfinder whose search for redemption nearly got him in a World War I trench when he was saved by a robed and ghostly woman with a gold chalice. A year after return to England, Washbook purchased the pub where he had grown impossibly old with the sense that he was "waiting for something ... that was coming to him." As Hellboy battles his last few soldier opponents, George Washbrook, skeletally aged and decrepit, is guided down the stairs of the pub by a ghostly robed woman. Alice falls to her knees and offers Excalibur to Washbrook, crowned by the robed woman as he transforms into a stern and regally armored youth as he accepts the holy grail and uses the chalice to restoring the undead army to life. Entering Nimue's chamber, Hellboy knocks her helmet up with an axe he picked up along the way. As Nimue's helmet hits the floor and splits back into three ravens with two flying out to call her army to commence humanity's extermination, the being possessing Nimue's mutating body introduces itself is the Ogdru Jahad. Ogdru Jahad explain that Rasputin's ritual allowed them to slowly escape their prison as the world gradually descended in chaos. As the lightning storm builds outside Nimue's tower, Nimue's body gradually mutates from the Ogdru Jahad's possession into a dragon while telling Hellboy he is too late to stop the army's advance.

At the pub, Alice hears the chant of Nimue's approaching army and the barkeep tells her it is spearheaded by the four horsemen of the apocalypse and that the human who survive the war and the pestilence and famine to follow will fed on by the Ogdru Hem and their creatures. On the field outside Nimue's tower War and the army he leads clash with Washbrook and his own, as Washbrook swears they'll never set foot in England. As Alice rushes out to find Hellboy over the barkeep's pursuing protests, the Dragon offers Hellboy a quick death but is cheered when Hellboy attacks it: "Given the way you have lived, I feared you would choose an easy death." The Dragon blasts Hellboy out the tower's window with a gust of flame but Hellboy grabs the window-frame and attacks again. The Dragon reminds Hellboy that It had been there from the world's beginning and enigmatically announces "I am time, the destroyer: We are bound together in that." As Hellboy begins to repeatedly batter the dragon, innumerable lightning bolts descend on England demolishing landmarks, landscapes and cities. Alice and the barkeep come upon the last of Nimue's witches at the edge of a lake, apologizing before she, too, drowns herself. King Vold with his Wild Hunt rides through the woods crying "Doom!" and Alice flees into the battlefield, now a sea of blood littered with small islands of corpses and fire. Wandering the field she sees three crowned women reclaiming Excalibur and comforting the dying Washbrook, victorious and once again an old man. Ganeida addresses Alice from the same spear (presumably borne in the battle) on which she had been impaled when flung from Nimue's tower window, saying that Washbrook and his soldiers were fated to die in glory winning this battle, leaving lesser men behind to face "Ragna Rok," the apocalypse. She asks why Queen Mab hasn't yet told Alice that the battlefield is that of Vigrid, where Ragna Rok is prophesied to occur, with a battle between a dragon and the champion of man signaling "the end."

As Hellboy battles the dragon in the ruins atop the tower, the lightning storm demolishes and depopulates England. It continues as Hellboy is thrown down and pinned beneath the Dragon's monstrous claw. As the Dragon exults silently in its power, Alice confronts the barkeep, who she now realizes (from Ganeida's question) is dead Queen Mab. Mab confirms that she is dead and the Dragon is that same one whose battle signals the world's end and the storm now ravaging Britain will eventually spread over the whole world, leaving it ruled by monsters until (as seen in BPRD: King of Fear), "it all burns." Then, she insists gratefully, a new world will rise. Hellboy cannot win trying to save the world: "This world's run its course, but it's not that it goes -- it's how it goes." The Dragon having escaped its prison early, "Hellboy fights to buy this world a little more time... time enough for his friends [pictured as BPRD's Abe Sapien, Liz Sherman, and Roger the Homunculus] to do what they must ... so when the new world comes, at least the spirit of man will survive." As a protesting Alice reaches the foot of the tower, she passes Sir Edward Grey, who tells her to hurry. At the tower top, still pinned by the exulting dragon's claw, Hellboy sees Vasilisa, the girl from Russian folklore who had helped him in Darkness Calls and advised him in The Wild Hunt. She is holding the last of the live ravens from Nimue's helmet. She asks Hellboy how he feels and he confirms that as she had told him, dying doesn't hurt. Crying, she asks him if he's ready and he says "I guess so." She turns the raven back into an iron sword with a bird's head ornament similar to that adorning Ohlomi's staff from Hellboy: The Third Wish. Hellboy takes the sword and as his blood runs down it, it turns to gold. Then he slices half through the Dragon's leg. Alice cowers on the stairs outside the room as the Dragon convulses and Hellboy clings to it using his stone right hand while he releases streams of muddy golden blood from the Dragon's belly with the other. When Hellboy climbs a bit higher and stabs the Dragon's chest, he releases a gout of flame, and sends the Dragon's body collapsing lifelessly onto the tower.

As Alice rushes into the room and Hellboy quips about the day he's had, Nimue's spirit emerges from Dragon's chest and uses her final moments to kill Hellboy by ripping out his heart before being dragged in Hell by the ghosts of England's drowned witches. Hellboy's gun-belt sits in a pile of dust (his stone hand is not in frame) and the red piece on Morgan's disordered chess board (over which Death stands watching) is rubble. Alice opens her eyes from weeping and finds herself back in the pub which has clearly not been inhabited for years - Washbrook's World War I photo has been replaced with that of the pub's real former owners (one of whom resembles Queen Mab as the barkeep). Mab's crown sits on the counter. Alice collapses on the stairs and weeps. In the woods outside, a smiling Morgan frees Gruagach from Merlin's curse to take him with her to the next life as neither wants to live to see what becomes world next. As England's survivors wander out into the smoke and rubble, lilies (resembling those grown from Hellboy's blood after his battle with Saint Leonard's worm) grow in the shadow of a ruined London column. Despite the Dragon's defeat, the Ogdru Jahad have yet to fully manifest themselves.

The inside back cover of the final issue is an advertisement for the series' continuation: it shows what seems to be the statue of a half-robed skeleton gripping Hellboy's red and still-flaming heart in one hand, with the caption: "Coming in 2012: - Hellboy in Hell - by Mike Mignola."
