= B.P.R.D.: The Black Flame =

- Trade Paperback Cover

Publication information
- Publisher: Dark Horse Comics
- Format: Trade Paperback
- Genre: Action/adventure, horror
- Publication date: July 12, 2006
- Main character(s): Kate Corrigan; Ben Daimio; Johann Kraus; Roger; Abe Sapien; Liz Sherman

Creative team
- Created by: Mike Mignola
- Written by: Mike Mignola; John Arcudi
- Artist(s): Guy Davis
- Letterer(s): Clem Robins
- Colorist(s): Dave Stewart
- Editor(s): Scott Allie

Collected editions
- B.P.R.D.: The Black Flame: ISBN 978-1-59307-550-7

B.P.R.D.: The Black Flame is the fifth trade paperback collection in the B.P.R.D. series.

== Publication history ==
B.P.R.D.: The Black Flame was originally published from August 2005 through to January 2006 as a six-issue B.P.R.D. comic book miniseries, written by Mike Mignola and John Arcudi with art by Guy Davis and published by Dark Horse Comics. Each issue featured a cover by Mike Mignola.

Later, when this story would be collected in B.P.R.D. Plague of Frogs - Volume 2, the first issue would become chapter one of War on Frogs, and the third issue of War on Frogs would become the epilogue for The Black Flame. This was to make for a better reading order.

== Story ==
=== Chapter 1 ===
Daimio, Liz, Johann, Roger, and a host of B.P.R.D. soldiers battle hordes of frogs underground. Roger has become quite adept in battle, mimicking Daimio. When they find a nest, Liz burns it. Further underground, a figure from the Zinco Corporation collects the few tadpoles that escaped.

=== Chapter 2 ===
At the Zinco Corporation, Mr. Pope, the head of the company, is pouring money into research and development to learn about the frogs. The frogs show a great deal of intelligence, and have learnt to talk and write.

Meanwhile, Abe has still not returned to the field since the Crab Point incident in Plague of Frogs. In British Columbia, Roger shows his skills as a leader by successfully avoiding a frog ambush.

Using the frogs he has raised and trained, Mr. Pope dons the outfit of a Nazi war criminal, The Black Flame, and goes out among the frogs in the wild.

In Montana, Liz is approached by an elderly woman who gives her a flower. Shortly afterwards, Liz passes out.

=== Chapter 3 ===
Liz has a vision of a shadowy figure, warning her that the situation with the frogs is much worse than she can imagine. Liz awakens in a hospital bed, coughing up a balled-up piece of parchment. Professor O'Donnell sees the parchment which mentions Katha-Hem, a creature that will dwarf Sadu-Hem (the creature unleashed in Seed of Destruction and Plague of Frogs). Liz goes to speak to Daimio, interrupting some kind of therapy he's undertaking. After they both leave the room, unnoticed by Liz the "therapist" has mysteriously disappeared as if he was never there.

At the Zinco Corporation, Mr. Pope begins a ceremony that ignites true black flame on him.

In Ontario Roger is leading another attack against the frogs in a factory. After the battle, he sees The Black Flame watching him, then the factory explodes. All the B.P.R.D. soldiers are killed and among the ruins lies the remaining fragments of Roger's body.

=== Chapter 4 ===
Liz is devastated by the news of Roger's death and moves into his room. Johann is alarmed by the manner in which Roger's remains are treated by the B.P.R.D.

Liz's visions of the shadowy figure continue, trying to shake her from her grief and into action.

In Lincoln, Nebraska, The Black Flame leads the frogs into battle. Abe finally decides to return to the field. The Black Flame learns that the frogs were only using him to summon Katha-Hem. In the battle that ensues, Abe is knocked unconscious.

=== Chapter 5 ===
Abe awakens to find The Black Flame crouching over him, confessing to have made a mistake. The enormous creature, Katha-Hem, attacks the city of Lincoln. Realising the figure in her visions seems to know about Katha-Hem, Liz allows Johann to put her into a trance so that she can talk to him. This time Liz sees the figure clearly, a robed man covered in snakes. He shows her a tablet in hope that Liz will "see". Liz awakens from the trance in realisation. In Roger's room she finds the Shaman's device Roger recovered in Born Again.

=== Chapter 6 ===
Johann, Abe, Liz and Daimio prepare themselves to attack Katha-Hem. Katha-Hem has been spewing masses of mist into Lincoln, transforming the city's population into monsters. When the B.P.R.D. attacks, Liz has a vision of a Hyperborean shaman holding the same device Roger found in Born Again. As the shaman chants, Liz copies his words, and the device becomes alive with energy. Liz releases the energy into Katha-Hem, destroying it.

The Black Flame, grateful to be free of the frogs, approaches Liz and asks her for help to get out of his suit, but he is taken by the frogs and dragged away.

In B.P.R.D. Headquarters, a crew begin dissecting Roger's body. When Johann learns of this, he is outraged and scares the scientists away. He then sits alone with the remains of his friend.

== Collected Editions ==
=== Trade Paperback ===
The trade paperback includes a sketchbook with art by Guy Davis:

- B.P.R.D.: The Black Flame
  (168 pages, July 12, 2006, ISBN 978-1-59307-550-7)

=== B.P.R.D Omnibus Edition ===
The trade was later collected as a part of the Plague of Frogs cycle in the B.P.R.D. Omnibus format, along with B.P.R.D.: The Dead and B.P.R.D.: War on Frogs. This format is available in both hardcover and paperback editions.

- B.P.R.D. Plague of Frogs - Volume 2
  (480 pages, August 17, 2011, ISBN 978-1-59582-672-5)
