= B.P.R.D.: Hollow Earth and Other Stories =

B.P.R.D.: Hollow Earth & Other Stories
- Trade Paperback Cover

Publication information
- Publisher: Dark Horse Comics
- Format: Trade Paperback
- Genre: Action/adventure, horror
- Publication date: January 29, 2003
- Main character(s): Kate Corrigan; Lobster Johnson; Johann Kraus; Roger; Abe Sapien; Liz Sherman

Creative team
- Created by: Mike Mignola
- Written by: Mike Mignola; Christopher Golden; Tom Sniegoski; Brian McDonald
- Artist(s): Mike Mignola; Ryan Sook; Matthew Dow Smith; Derek Thompson
- Inker(s): Curtis Arnold
- Letterer(s): Clem Robins; Dan Jackson; Pat Brosseau
- Colorist(s): Dave Stewart; James Sinclair
- Editor(s): Scott Allie

Collected editions
- B.P.R.D.: Hollow Earth & Other Stories: ISBN 978-1-56971-862-9

B.P.R.D.: Hollow Earth & Other Stories is the first trade paperback collection in the Bureau for Paranormal Research and Defense (B.P.R.D.) series.

== Collected stories ==
=== Hollow Earth ===
This was the first B.P.R.D. mini-series. Three issues long, it was written by Mike Mignola, Christopher Golden and Tom Sniegoski with art by Ryan Sook and Curtis Arnold. It was published from January to June 2002.

Hellboy novelist Golden and his long-time writing partner Sniegoski wrote the story with regular input from Mignola. Sook was chosen to draw the book following a meeting with Mignola at a convention in Oakland, CA in 1995 and saw it as a chance to have a book all to himself although Arnold joined as inker when schedules started running tight halfway through production.

The story features Dr. Kate Corrigan, Abe Sapien, Roger the Homunculus, and newcomer Johann Kraus on a mission to rescue Liz Sherman. Hellboy also makes appearances via flashbacks.

=== B.P.R.D. Promo ===
A newspaper-format promotional teaser for the series titled B.P.R.D.. It was published as three single-page installments in Dark Horse Extra from December 2001 to February 2002, featuring the first appearance of Johann Kraus.

=== The Killer in My Skull ===
Originally published as a back-up feature in Hellboy: Box Full of Evil #1 (September 1999). Lobster Johnson made his first appearance in this written by Mike Mignola, with pencils by Matthew Dow Smith and inks by Ryan Sook (in his first contribution to the series).

In the story, Johnson and his sidekick investigate a series of bizarre deaths which appear to have been committed using telekinesis.

=== Abe Sapien versus Science ===
Originally published in 1999 as a back-up feature in Hellboy: Box Full of Evil #2 (September 1999). Abe Sapien made a solo appearance in this written and inked by Mike Mignola and with pencils by Matthew Dow Smith.

In the story, Sapien rescues and reanimates Roger the homunculus when B.P.R.D. scientist Dr. Roddel threatens to dissect him just as Abe recalls he threatened to do with him when he was first discovered.

Cover by Mignola for Abe Sapien: Drums of the Dead.

=== Drums of the Dead ===
Originally published as the main feature in the one-shot Abe Sapien: Drums of the Dead (March 4, 1998) with the Hellboy short story Heads by Mike Mignola as the back up feature.

Abe Sapien made his first solo appearance in this story written by Brian McDonald with art by Derek Thompson.

Series editor Scott Allie had been in discussions with Brian McDonald about his next project after the success of Harry the Cop and Hellboy creator Mike Mignola had been considering using Derek Thompson on a Hellboy and so it naturally evolved that the two friends should end up working together on this project.

In the story, weird deaths in the South Seas expose an ancient tragedy linked to the transatlantic slave trade.

== Collected editions ==
=== Trade paperback ===
All the stories have been collected into one trade paperback:

- B.P.R.D.: Hollow Earth & Other Stories
  (120 pages, January 29, 2003, ISBN 978-1-56971-862-9)

=== B.P.R.D Omnibus Edition ===
The trade was later collected as a part of the Plague of Frogs cycle in the B.P.R.D. Omnibus format, along with The Soul of Venice & Other Stories and Plague of Frogs. This format is available in both hardcover and paperback editions.

- B.P.R.D. Plague of Frogs - Volume 1
  (408 pages, January 19, 2011, ISBN 978-1-59582-609-1)
