= B.P.R.D. Hell on Earth: Gods and Monsters =

- Trade Paperback Cover

Publication information
- Publisher: Dark Horse Comics
- Format: Trade Paperback
- Genre: Action/adventure, horror
- Publication date: January 11, 2012
- Main characters: Kate Corrigan; Andrew Devon; Fenix; Johann Kraus; Panya; Abe Sapien; Liz Sherman

Creative team
- Created by: Mike Mignola
- Written by: Mike Mignola; John Arcudi
- Artists: Guy Davis; Tyler Crook
- Letterer: Clem Robins
- Colorist: Dave Stewart
- Editor: Scott Allie

Collected editions
- B.P.R.D. Hell on Earth: Gods and Monsters: ISBN 978-1-59582-822-4

B.P.R.D. Hell on Earth: Gods and Monsters is the second trade paperback collection in the Hell on Earth cycle of the B.P.R.D. series.
