= B.P.R.D.: Garden of Souls =

- Trade Paperback Cover

Publication information
- Publisher: Dark Horse Comics
- Format: Trade Paperback
- Genre: Action/adventure, horror
- Publication date: January 30, 2008
- Main characters: Kate Corrigan; Ben Daimio; Johann Kraus; Panya; Abe Sapien; Liz Sherman

Creative team
- Created by: Mike Mignola
- Written by: Mike Mignola; John Arcudi
- Artist: Guy Davis
- Letterer: Clem Robins
- Colorist: Dave Stewart
- Editor: Scott Allie

Collected editions
- B.P.R.D.: Garden of Souls: ISBN 978-1-59307-882-9

B.P.R.D.: Garden of Souls is the seventh trade paperback collection in the B.P.R.D. series.

== Publication history ==
B.P.R.D.: Garden of Souls was originally published as a five-issue B.P.R.D. comic book mini-series, written by Mike Mignola and John Arcudi with art by Guy Davis and published by Dark Horse Comics. Each issue featured a cover by Guy Davis.

== Story ==
=== Chapter 1 ===
The ageless mummy, Panya, is introduced, the team continues to mourn the loss of Roger, and Abe Sapien receives a strange map that may hold clues to his past life as Dr. Langdon Everett Caul.

=== Chapter 2 ===
Abe and Ben Daimio travel to Balikpapan, Indonesia to search for the mysterious sender of Abe's cigar case. Liz Sherman continues to have apocalyptic visions, and begins to question whether or not she can trust her teammates. Johann Kraus discovers a startling secret about a Nazi war criminal known as The Crimson Lotus.

=== Chapter 3 ===
Abe is drawn to a small island where he discovers the members of Langdon Caul's Oannes Society are still alive. They have been maintaining their bodies in modified Victorian diving suits, but plan to transfer their consciousnesses to newly grown bodies in the near future. Johann confides in Liz and Kate his suspicions regarding a familial connection between Ben and The Crimson Lotus.

=== Chapter 4 ===
Abe discovers the living mummy, Panya, is being held by Caul's former friends. She relates her experience of living in Victorian England and being kidnapped by the Oannes Society (who believe her to be the sea goddess Naunet). The Oannes society reveal their plan to create a massive tsunami by triggering several explosives across the East Pacific. By killing millions of people, they will harvest the power of their departed souls.

=== Chapter 5 ===
Abe is able to foil the plans of the Oannes Society by destroying the artificial bodies they have grown to contain the souls of their intended victims. Ben manages to locate and disarm the bombs planted by the society. Panya is freed from her captors and relocated to the B.P.R.D.

== Collected Editions ==
=== Trade Paperback ===
The trade paperback features extensive original sketches from Davis:

- B.P.R.D.: Garden of Souls (146 pages, January 2008, ISBN 978-1-59307-882-9)

=== B.P.R.D Omnibus Edition ===
The trade was later collected as a part of the Plague of Frogs cycle in the B.P.R.D. Omnibus format, along with B.P.R.D.: The Universal Machine and B.P.R.D.: Killing Ground. This format is available in both hardcover and paperback editions.

- B.P.R.D. Plague of Frogs - Volume 3
  (448 pages, April 4, 2012, ISBN 978-1-59582-860-6)
