= B.P.R.D.: The Soul of Venice and Other Stories =

B.P.R.D.: The Soul of Venice & Other Stories
- Trade Paperback Cover

Publication information
- Publisher: Dark Horse Comics
- Format: Trade paperback
- Genre: Action/adventure, horror
- Publication date: August 25, 2004
- Main characters: Kate Corrigan; Johann Kraus; Lobster Johnson; Roger; Abe Sapien; Liz Sherman

Creative team
- Created by: Mike Mignola
- Written by: Miles Gunter; Michael Avon Oeming; Brian Augustyn; Geoff Johns; Scott Kolins; Joe Harris; Mike Mignola
- Artists: Michael Avon Oeming; Guy Davis; Scott Kolins; Dave Stewart; Cameron Stewart
- Penciller: Adam Pollina
- Inker: Guillermo Zubiaga
- Letterers: Ken Bruzenak; Michelle Madsen; Pat Brosseau; Michael Heisler
- Colorists: Dave Stewart; Lee Loughridge; Michelle Madsen
- Editor: Scott Allie

Collected editions
- 'B.P.R.D.: The Soul of Venice & Other Stories': ISBN 978-1-59307-132-5

B.P.R.D.: The Soul of Venice & Other Stories is the second trade paperback collection in the B.P.R.D. series.

== Publication history ==
The series of four one-shot comic books written by a variety of guest writers and artists were published bi-monthly to alternate with sister title Hellboy: Weird Tales in 2003 whilst Mignola was in Prague working on the first Hellboy movie.

== Collected stories ==
=== The Soul of Venice ===
This story written by Miles Gunter and Michael Avon Oeming with Mike Mignola and drawn by Michael Avon Oeming was published in B.P.R.D.: The Soul of Venice (May 14, 2003).

In the story, Sapien returns to Venice with Sherman, Kraus and Roger to investigate an environmental disaster in the canals that leads them to the haunted home of the debauched 13th century vampire lord Romulus Diovanni. Diovanni defeats the B.P.R.D. and uses the Tetragrammaton to summon the demonic Lord Shax to whom he offers the spirit of the Roman goddess Cloacina. Shax dismisses Diovanni and Roger is then able to destroy the vampire and release the goddess to restore the city.

=== Dark Waters ===
This story written by Brian Augustyn with art by Guy Davis was published in B.P.R.D.: Dark Waters (July 23, 2003).

In the story, when the draining of the town pond in Shiloh, Massachusetts reveals the perfectly preserved corpses of three sisters killed during a witch-hunt in 1693 Sapien and Roger are sent to investigate. Pastor Blackwood a descendant of the town’s original Witchfinder General becomes possessed by the cursed water and attempts to destroy the bodies but Sapien is able to initiate a proper Christian funeral service for the sisters that sends them to their eternal rest taking Blackwood with them.

=== Night Train ===
This story written by Geoff Johns and Scott Kolins with art by Scott Kolins and Dave Stewart was published in B.P.R.D.: Night Train (September 17, 2003).

In the story, Lobster Johnson fails to stop a Nazi saboteur killing his assistant and destroying a train carrying scientists and equipment for the Manhattan Project in Colorado 1939. Sherman and Roger investigate a vengeful ghost train in present-day Alabama that leads them to the now aged saboteur who imposes his aura on Sherman so the ghosts take her instead. Roger has a vision of the ghost of Johnson who helps him to prove himself by rescuing Sherman and apprehending the real saboteur.

=== There's Something Under My Bed ===
This written story by Joe Harris with art by Adam Pollina and Guillermo Zubiaga was published in B.P.R.D.: There's Something Under My Bed (November 19, 2003).

In the story, when young Bobby McKenna becomes the latest child to be kidnapped by a demon called Charlie who lives under the beds in Masonville, Pennsylvania, Corrigan sends Sapien, Sherman, Kraus, and Roger to look over the rest of the town’s children. Sapien hides in a closet to confront Charlie and is teleported to where the children are being held. Charlie turns on his boss Oogie when he threatens to eat the children and Sherman arrives in time to rescue Sapien and the kids.

=== Another Day at the Office ===
This short story, written by Mike Mignola with art by Cameron Stewart, premiered in this collection.

In the story, Sapien, Krauss, and Agent Turner from the London Office arrive in Bolgrad, Moldavia in the aftermath of a zombie attack that leads them to a 15th-century chapel where latent psychic Robert Huntley has been possessed by the spirit of bloodthirsty tyrant and national hero Count Yegor Kurya who they quickly dispatch.

== Collected Editions ==
=== Trade Paperback ===
The stories were collected into a trade paperback:

- B.P.R.D.: The Soul of Venice & Other Stories
  (128 pages, August 25, 2004, ISBN 978-1-59307-132-5)

=== B.P.R.D. Omnibus Edition ===
The trade was later collected as a part of the Plague of Frogs cycle in the B.P.R.D. Omnibus format, along with Hollow Earth & Other Stories and B.P.R.D.: Plague of Frogs. This format is available in both hardcover and paperback editions.

- B.P.R.D. Plague of Frogs - Volume 1
  (408 pages, January 19, 2011, ISBN 978-1-59582-609-1)
