= Hellboy: Darkness Calls =

Comic book series

- Trade Paperback Cover

Publication information
- Publisher: Dark Horse Comics
- Format: Limited series
- Genre: Horror
- Publication date: April – November 2007

Creative team
- Created by: Mike Mignola
- Written by: Mike Mignola
- Artist: Duncan Fegredo
- Letterer: Clem Robins
- Colorist: Dave Stewart
- Editor: Scott Allie

Collected editions
- Hellboy: Darkness Calls: ISBN 978-1-59307-896-6

Hellboy: Darkness Calls is a comic book limited series created by Mike Mignola and published by American company Dark Horse Comics. Parts of the story arc were adapted for the 2019 Hellboy reboot directed by Neil Marshall.

== Plot ==
In Darkness Calls, several plotlines and characters from earlier stories converge.

=== Chapter One ===
In a tomb near Lucca, Italy, Igor Bromhead (last seen in Hellboy: Box Full of Evil) summons the witch-goddess Hecate to a catacomb using runes written in blood. She demands to see the lizard body with which the devil Astaroth had cursed him and he obliges. Before she can destroy him he surprises her by invoking her secret name: Ilsa Haupstein, since her resurrection in Hellboy: Wake the Devil. Bromhead reveals the bones of Haupstein's lover and Hecate's son, the vampire Vladimir Giurescu, from which Bromhead has magically wrung the information which gives him full power over the horrified goddess.

Back in England, three witches meet among standing stones; they have recovered the horns Hellboy broke from his skull during Hellboy: Wake the Devil and carved a bust of him from one of them. Hellboy wakes in the house of Harry Middleton, an old friend of his and of his adoptive father Trevor Bruttenholm. Under the witches' (and the carved horn's) influence, Hellboy decides to go for a walk, but not before accepting a vintage pistol and holster from Middleton as a gift. On his walk into the woods he is followed by a troop of cats and spied upon from the trees by a haggard specter with copper coins for eyes. Hellboy encounters two odd men and a woman who see him and cut short their rendition of the evocative "Mister Stormalong" sea shanty, whose monster-hunting folk hero they identify with Hellboy, and whose verses we have been hearing over several pages of captions. They inform Hellboy that they have reached the spot where corrupt 17th-century witchfinder Henry Hood hung three witches, "their ladies", who cursed him with torture and undeath (he is the coin-eyed specter we have seen). After hearing the hanging scene reenacted, the trio rush off to find the burial site of the three hanged witches, whose doting animal familiars they reveal themselves to be: while Hellboy finds himself immobilized (by the spell being cast on his horn) they begin to assume the shapes of a frog, a raven and a cat, resurrecting their former mistresses with a potion poured on their gravesite, and promising Hellboy a gathering of witches (both alive and dead) "like none before in the history of the world" telling Hellboy: "They gather for you!!"

=== Chapter Two ===
The three witches with the carved horn thank the night and its associated powers for binding Hellboy and for resurrecting their three dead sister witches, executed by Henry Hood but now flying about a shocked Hellboy. The three greet their dead mistresses happily but Henry Hood bursts upon them transfixing two of them with the blue unearthly fire of his cutlass. It also wounds the half-demon Hellboy, who he attacks for his hellish parentage, leaving Hellboy reluctantly to be rescued by the third witch and her raven familiar who carry Hellboy off amid a flock of undead witches "to the sabbath at Leeds" until he shoots her with Harry Middleton's pistol and, dropped, plummets from the sky. He has not escaped, however, as he crashes through the roof of a disused, cobwebbed church and finds it filled with live witches who await him, having summoned him there using his carved horn.

For a cautious, inquisitive Hellboy, they recount the scene between Bromhead and Hecate, filling in relevant history from Hellboy: Wake the Devil and showing a triumphant Bromhead removing Ilsa Haupstein's wailing corpse from the Iron Maiden in which she had become Hecate, and bricking it into an alcove with Giurescu's still-amorous skeleton, there to wait "till Doomsday." Bromhead had then tried futilely and disastrously to become King of the Witches by drawing down lunar powers beyond his strength. They tell Hellboy that as the son of a human witch and of the demon ruling the witches of Lancashire and Abbotsbury (and East Bromwich, Faversham and Berkswell), they have selected him as their king. Hellboy angrily refuses them, declares himself at war with them, and begins to make his way out of the church. The carved horn shatters. Panic-stricken, the witches cast about for a plan, when Koku, a diminutive servant of Hellboy's old enemy Baba Yaga, appears and conveys his mistress' offer to take Hellboy off their hands if they (who unlike the Baba Yaga still live in the real world) "offer" him to her. The witches agree, and Hellboy steps out of the church into the middle of a vast and empty wintry expanse through which an army of armed and fur-clad skeletons approach. Amidst the thicket of impaled lantern skulls in which she keeps her power, we see the Baba Yaga promising to take Hellboy's eye (in return for the one of hers he'd shot out decades before in "The Baba Yaga") and (as the arriving army reports to Hellboy) also his life.

=== Chapter Three ===
As the witches debate who will rule them if not Hecate or Hellboy, Gruagach makes his presence known and offers the position of leadership to a witch the others fear greatly enough even after they poisoned and dismembered her long ago. Meanwhile, in the snowy plain "beyond the thrice-nine lands in the thrice-tenth kingdom" the Baba Yaga's army attacks Hellboy, who fights for a while and then runs into a wood. Giant wolves rush from the wood to attack the Baba Yaga's soldiers, and a giant white wolf guides Hellboy into the woods to the campfire of his master, the Leshii. Hellboy bores the Leshii, who is nonetheless happy to save Hellboy in order to spite the Baba Yaga. Before departing in the form of a giant horned bear, the Leshii warns Hellboy to stay in the woods only for one night. He asks Perun, the Russian storm-god, to destroy the army, which is buried in snow, as Hellboy finds them when, just before daybreak, he is chased from the woods by the Leshii's wolves. Thwarted, the Baba Yaga flies in her mortar and pestle to the castle of Koschei the Deathless, who broods, cobwebbed on his throne, demanding that if he helps her, she must give him the gift of death. She promises to set him free from life in return for Hellboy's head. Meanwhile, Hellboy finds his way through a winter storm to a small house where he resists a brief attack from, and then makes friends with, the house's guardian spirit or Domovoi. The Domovoi tells him that Perun is hiding him from the Baba Yaga and from Koschei using the storm weather, but that Koschei cannot be killed as his soul is inside an egg inside a duck inside a rabbit inside a goat which the Baba Yaga has hidden. Meanwhile, the Baba Yaga finds Perun (whom we have just seen as a spear-armed horseman riding above stormclouds) drawing lightning branches with a stick in the mud of a riverbank, a mud-caked and naked old man. Her soldiers dispatch him with arrows as she tells him she will tolerate no other Russian gods than herself.

=== Chapter Four ===
A bird grieves over Perun's body, meanwhile somewhere in England, blood wells over the lintel of a hilltop church, flowing from two murdered monks. A hole in the floor before the altar leads to an ancient cavern where the Gruagach and two elfin servants approach a well with a giant iron lid. When Gruagach rings on the lid with his hammer, a giant appears who puts on spectacles to read the letter Gruagach hands him - from the giant's masters, the witches of Britain - and then begins to weep at what he must do. He raises the lid and climbs down to get his prisoner for the Gruagach. With Perun dead, meanwhile, the storm outside Hellboy's cottage has failed, and Koschei kicks in the door. The two fight as Koschei explains his intentions and motives, and the Domovoi wails over his broken furniture. Hellboy impales Koschei and beheads him but Koschei merely reattaches his head. At that moment Vasilisa, appearing at the cottage's door, subdues Koschei with light from the skull she received from Baba Yaga in her legend. Hellboy pins Koschei to the floor with his own sword and they run. Kosschei ignores the Domovoi's goading, extricates himself, and takes out an arrow from his pack. Vasilisa explains to Hellboy the story of her magic doll and her time with the Baba Yaga, and shows Hellboy the tunnel back to the real world, before falling to the first of Koschei's arrows, which also pepper Hellboy as Koschei rides on them. Dying, Vasilisa gives Hellboy the wooden comb and blue handkerchief her doll had given her ("When I was old and grey and dying in my bed," she says) and then becomes her doll, still pierced by Koschei's arrow. Hellboy confronts the now-arrived Koschei.

=== Chapter Five ===
At Yggdrasil, the world tree, a squirrel, (never identified specifically as Ratatosk) worries aloud that Ragnarok has come with the death of Vasilisa, but one of the Baba Yaga's soldiers shoots him and he dies. The Baba Yaga, Koku, and a figure that seems to be Death watch from their place at the tree's roots. In the distance, Hellboy tosses Vasilisa's comb at Koschei, who tosses it over his shoulder. Where it hits the earth a small forest springs up, its branches lifting Koschei into the sky and growing agonizingly through his chest and limbs. The Baba Yaga insists that there is no longer a place even in the real world to which Hellboy can run, and back in the hilltop church, the giant climbs out of his well carrying a small wooden box containing the dismembered and segmented body of his prisoner. He then climbs tearfully back into the hole, pulling the lid down over him, in order to escape the new and bloody world coming into being. Tugging the box out of the church, Gruagach and his companions tell a small bird (who will next appear in the opening scene of Hellboy: The Wild Hunt) that it had best tell its mistress to choose sides "for our new queen is here." Elsewhere, the lead fairy from Hellboy: The Corpse asks the Dagda, fairy king, how bad it will be and the Dagda answers "We will not survive it." In the Thrice-Tenth Kingdom, Hellboy begins to climb toward the tunnel back to reality; but the Baba Yaga calls for Koschei's soul and begins to breathe her power into its mouth. Up in the branches, Koschei screams as his body bursts with light and fire burning free of the branches. He descends blazing upon Hellboy as the Baba Yaga anticipates using Hellboy's eye to look into Hell and into secret places to learn "the secret workings of all things." As Hellboy crushes Koschei beneath a boulder, the Baba Yaga repeats that Hellboy has no home left in the real world, and through the tunnel we see England's witches flying about their cobwebbed church celebrating the approach of their new queen. She breathes more power into the goat and Koschei bursts up through the stone as a blazing giant, screaming "DEATH!"

=== Chapter Six ===
Baba Yaga's ten thousand skull lanterns are going out, all their power breathed into Koschei. Meanwhile, two of Baba Yaga's undead soldiers reminisce about serving under Koschei when alive, and pity his servitude to the witch. Koschei begs Hellboy to accept death, and regrets that he is cursed to keep killing Vasilisa. The Baba Yaga breathes her last spark of life into Koschei who still cannot defeat Hellboy. She considers using the spirit of Rasputin which she had stored in an acorn since the epilogue of Hellboy: Conqueror Worm, but Koku knocks it from her hand so it falls through the roots of the World Tree into Hell. Defeated, Koschei hurls his sword at and into a departing Hellboy's back, so that he drops Vasilisa's blue handkerchief which becomes a flood to carry Koshchei's body away. Death explains to the Baba Yaga that "Hellboy is as deathless as Koschei" and his eye must be given freely, for which Hellboy is not yet ready. Hellboy wanders through the tunnel into the cobwebbed church (now empty), where he silently passes the ghostly figure of Vasilisa, lighting a cigar and reaching back to pull out Koschei's sword. Henry Hood greets him in the churchyard repeating "Finish it" before dissolving into dust and two copper coins. Scratched in the rust of Hood's cutlass is the name: IGOR BROMHEAD. Forty-two hours later in Italy, near Lucca, two villagers show Hellboy where Bromhead has been hiding - he has been eating their sheep. Having swallowed the moon, he has bloated into a monstrous giant human worm. He begs Hellboy to kill him, while two witches, flying as birds, urge that he be left to his fate. Hellboy asks if he's ready and then stabs him with Hood's cutlass. Dying, and once again with a fully human body, Bromhead tells Hellboy that he will see him in Hell, and that he sees him there already, seated on a dragon at the head of his army. Meanwhile, the Dagda confronts Gruagach and his friends have dragged the Blood Queen's box to the top of a hill before being killed by one of Gruagach's friends who takes his own life soon after. Gruagach announces the arrival of the watching fairies' new queen, who says from her box (one corner washed by the golden stream of Dagda's blood) "My day's come at last... and woe unto man."

=== Epilogues ===
At the Colorado headquarters of the B.P.R.D., Kate Corrigan is reading to Liz Sherman and Abe Sapien from a letter that has arrived from their former teammate Hellboy. Kate is alarmed when Abe points out that Harry Middleton has been dead for over twenty years.

Meanwhile, back at the Italian catacombs, the imprisoned Hecate receives a visit from the spirit of Sir Edward Grey. She tells Grey that she is his queen and that he has walked in her shadow for a long time. At his request she tells him of her fatal seduction of Thoth, king of the Hyperborean city of Gorinium, who kept the knowledge of three captive Watchers mostly to himself. After Thoth fell asleep, Hecate entered the garden where she killed the Watchers, drinking up their blood so she can write all of their knowledge on the walls of Gorinium's temple so everyone would read it. This event caused the downfall of the Hyperborean civilization as Hecate, revered by some as a goddess, is cursed into her lamia-like form by Thoth. Regardless, Hecate tells Grey she is still unrepentant at her mission to enlighten and free mankind: insisting that she is beyond human knowledge. Before entering a deep sleep until the last day when Hellboy calls her, Hecate foretells her own death in an upcoming war and that Grey will find and assist Helboy. Hecate concludes her prophecy before entering her rest by telling Grey: "Before you are finally allowed to die, you will suffer as few men have ever suffered. You will learn to do evil to accomplish good."

== Collected editions ==
It was collected as the eighth Hellboy trade paperback with two new epilogues:

- Darkness Calls (6-issue mini-series, Dark Horse Comics, tpb, 192 pages, 2008, ISBN 978-1-59307-896-6)

== See also ==
- List of Hellboy comics
