= Hellboy: The Wild Hunt =

Ninth collected edition of the Dark Horse Comics series Hellboy

- Trade Paperback Cover

Publication information
- Publisher: Dark Horse Comics
- Format: Limited series
- Genre: Horror

Creative team
- Created by: Mike Mignola
- Written by: Mike Mignola
- Artist: Duncan Fegredo
- Letterer: Clem Robins
- Colorist: Dave Stewart
- Editor: Scott Allie

Collected editions
- Hellboy: The Wild Hunt: ISBN 978-1-59582-431-8

Hellboy: The Wild Hunt is the ninth collected edition in Mike Mignola's Hellboy comic book series, the second of three connected story arcs written by Mignola and illustrated by Duncan Fegredo. Its eight chapters, collected in March 2010, were originally released from December 2008 through November 2009 as issues 1-8 of the Hellboy: The Wild Hunt limited series, also numbered (on the inside front cover) as issues 37 through 44 of the continuing Hellboy series. The storyline delves into Irish and Arthurian legend, reprising several characters first introduced in Hellboy short story "The Corpse". As with Hellboy stories generally, it was published by Dark Horse Comics.

Parts of the story arc were adapted for the 2019 Hellboy reboot directed by Neil Marshall.

== Summary ==
Asleep in the home of deceased friends in Italy, a dreaming Hellboy visits the funeral of the Irish fairy king Dagda, attended by several Tuatha de Danaan. The funeral is also attended by a fully grown Alice Monaghan, whom Hellboy saved as an infant when she was switched with the changeling Gruagach. Hellboy receives an invitation from British noblemen gathered to hunt giants, who call themselves "The Wild Hunt" after the legend of Herne the Hunter. Meanwhile, at the site of the Dagda's murder, a restless fairy army awaits the resurrection of the "Queen of Blood" who, the vengeful Gruagach argues, will soon rise to lead them in a war against Hellboy and humankind. Having joined the Wild Hunt, Hellboy and companions ride to a bridge where they will ambush a party of giants, but his fellow huntsmen betray and attack him, declaring that "the devil shall never sit on the throne of England."

While unconscious, Hellboy finds himself in the tomb of King Arthur, before awaking to find the hunting party slaughtered by the giants they had been hoping to ambush. The little bird from Hellboy's dream makes Hellboy invisible but Hellboy seeks out the giants, and shedding his invisibility, attacks them. Meanwhile, the arch-devil Astaroth (last seen in Box Full of Evil) appears before Gruagach and gives him a small chalice filled with the blood of an entire English village Astaroth has just killed. Gruagach pours it into the crate containing the remains of the Queen of Blood to resurrect her.

Having concluded his fight with the giants, which he remembers ruefully, Hellboy visits Alice's cottage in Ireland. A lifelong friend of the fairies, she has been expecting him since the Dagda's funeral and takes him to a hillside to meet Fairy Queen Mab. Meanwhile, the Queen of Blood accepts a delegation from the witches, punishing several who were responsible for betraying and killing her centuries previously out of fear. She then begins to assemble her full army. Back in Ireland, Alice and Hellboy wait for Queen Mab, discussing their responsibility for the brewing war. Mab, arriving, not only agrees, predicting that Hellboy's good deeds only doomed the world and his demonic savagery has begun consuming, as evidenced by his ruthlessness in fighting the giants. Before vanishing, she tells him his one hope is to inherit his mother's crown and lead an army against the army of the Queen of Blood. Once she is gone they find an odd little fairy waiting to guide them.

Hellboy flashes back to his brutal combat with the giants and then confronts his new guide, who he assumes is working for Queen Mab, and who repeatedly insists Hellboy is an Englishman despite Hellboy's protests to the contrary, as Hellboy and Alice follow him through a suddenly unearthly landscape. The two discuss Hellboy's recent death and resurrection (in short story "The Island") until their guide announces that, in revenge for all the faerie creatures Hellboy has killed in his career, he has led them into an ambush. Hellboy and Alice are besieged by a horde of pygmy fairy savages wielding poison-tipped weapons. Alice is struck and fatally poisoned, when three bird-women arrive, killing or scaring off Hellboy's attackers. They tell Hellboy that "their mistress" has medicine for Alice's poisoning and then transport him to a hill overlooking their castle, which is wreathed in flame.

Awaiting her own army, the Queen of Blood comforts Gruagach and promises to restore him to his prime to have his revenge on Hellboy. Meanwhile, Hellboy, outside the flame-ringed castle, is told that he's been brought to it in order to defeat Eligos, a duke of Hell commanding a troop of demons who besiege it. The demon batters Hellboy unstoppably until, in return for a promise of favor should he claim his throne, Hellboy learns from a nearby imp the secret of Eligos' one weakness, an insignia worn as a ring. Hellboy destroys the ring and kills the weakened demon, ignoring his pleas for mercy, before racing Alice into the castle to be immediately and successfully cured with the antidote. The mistress of the castle appears and is revealed to be Morgan le Fay. Meanwhile, the Queen of Blood receives a deputation from the dwarf-like King of Jutland. She rejects the king's gift of a crown and orders the king's tearful craftsman-ambassador to return home and murder the king, and to feed his heart to the forge to make her a helmet suitable of her new incarnation as Badbh, Macha, and Mor-rioghain, the triple goddess of war.

As Alice recovers from her poisoning, Morgan le Fay tells Hellboy that his witch mother (whose name she reveals to have been Sarah Hughes, his demon father's having been Azzael), was the last in a line of female descendants, all witches, of Mordred, her son by King Arthur. This means that Hellboy is Mordred's first male descendant, and "rightful king of Britain". While conveying Alice to a sickbed, she identifies Hellboy with the Red Dragon of Britain that Merlin identified under Vortigern's Tower. She then takes Hellboy to a garden pool where the sword Excalibur floats embedded in a stone. She reveals that the Queen of Blood is the witch Nimue, who seduced and stole Merlin's powers, using them to commune with the Ogdru Jahad. Nimue's coven feared her growing madness and killed her. Morgan insists that to defeat Nimue, Hellboy must draw Excalibur and thereby summon an undead army of British noblemen (many of whom seemingly hang in full armor from the branches of a great tree growing through her castle). As Morgan describes Nimue's bloodlust, Hellboy relives the conclusion of his fight with the giants, in which his own bloodlust (using a makeshift sword), had apparently caused him, in panels accompanied by quotes from the Book of Revelation, to briefly settle into his destined role as Beast of the Apocalypse. He awakens from his memories and Morgan leaves him, dejected and shaken, alone with the sword.

Walking through the castle Hellboy broods on the situation. In Alice's room he briefly sees a ghostly Vasilisa (last seen in Darkness Calls) who warns caution before disappearing. Alice awakens and urges him to take the sword, telling him of a dream she has just had in which King Arthur in his tomb explained her life is bound to the sword and that she will be "first to see the new king with his crown." Later, Hellboy hears a howling and leaves the now-sleeping Alice to investigate. Astaroth appears to him and tells him he hears the dogs of the mythical Wild Hunt who smell the war that's coming. Astaroth will not say who leads the Hunt but tells Hellboy that Satan has been asleep under his city of Pandemonium for "almost two thousand years now," fated to be killed in his sleep by Hellboy himself when Hellboy goes down to Pandemonium throwing down Satan's princes and generals, and claiming his waiting crown and his father's sword. Astaroth insists that Hellboy will then use his stone right hand to enliven a waiting inanimate army which alone can break the bonds of Hell freeing its denizens to overrun and annihilate the world. As Hellboy battles a reflection of himself, bearing sword and crown, which attacks him from a nearby mirror, Astaroth tells him that if he takes Excalibur (as he must to save the world from Nimue) the act will inevitably lead to him claiming his demon father's sword, and himself destroying the world. His battle with his mirror image concludes with the castle being briefly engulfed in flame, leaving him alone and worrying aloud what has happened to Alice.

Hellboy finds Alice's charred remains in her sickroom, where Vasilisa appears to Hellboy to ask him why he didn't take Excalibur. Hellboy explains that he does not trust Morgan le Fay and that, in light of the bloodlust he showed wielding a sword against the giants, he fears what he would do if he took Excalibur. She argues that rather than trusting what he's been told of his world-destroying destiny, he should trust Alice's faith in him and her desire for him to take the sword. He goes back to the sword, and - watched by Vasilisa and Astaroth, and from afar also by Queen Mab and Dagda's old servant, Sir Edward Grey and the witch doctor Mohlomi, the Baba Yaga and her servant Koku, and three witches watching scrying in their cauldron - he pulls the sword easily from the stone, saying "Son of a ..." and suddenly finds himself beside a still-living Alice out on the hillside where they had met Mab, dressed as if nothing had transpired since, save that Hellboy is holding the sword. They embrace, and in her castle Morgan notes the event while reviewing a chessboard populated by white and black skeletons and one red king. The Gruagach begs Nimue to empower him as promised, but when he ventures that she lacks the power to do so she becomes enraged at his lack of faith and banishes him from her service to wander off in tears. Hellboy and Alice wander down the hill musing over Hellboy's newfound kingship, as Lady Hatton of the Osiris club observes them in her scrying glass. When the club's newer members begin to panic over Hellboy's accession to kingship, they are killed by the club's original seven members who explain that they have been waiting for Hellboy's kingship since 1866 when the spirit Larzod, also inspiration of long-time Hellboy adversaries the Heliopic Brotherhood of Ra, had appeared to them and granted them immortality with which to await Hellboy's death in final battle, cutting off and seizing his world-controlling stone right hand. The craftsman-ambassador from Jutland, having murdered his king for the heart he has extracted to burn as fuel, tearfully holds up the helmet he has forged for Nimue, in the form of a trio of ravens.
