= Hellboy: The Crooked Man =

2024 film by Brian Taylor

- UK theatrical release poster
- Directed by: Brian Taylor
- Screenplay by: Christopher Golden; Mike Mignola; Brian Taylor
- Based on: Hellboy by Mike Mignola
- Produced by: Mike Richardson; Jeff Greenstein; Yariv Lerner; Jonathan Yuger; Les Weldon; Robert Van Norden; Sam Schulte
- Starring: Jack Kesy; Jefferson White; Adeline Rudolph
- Cinematography: Ivan Vatsov
- Edited by: Ryan Denmark
- Music by: Sven Faulconer
- Production companies: Millennium Media; Dark Horse Entertainment; Nu Boyana Film Studios; Campbell Grobman Films
- Distributed by: Ketchup Entertainment
- Release dates: June 20, 2024 (Belgium); October 8, 2024 (United States)
- Running time: 99 minutes
- Country: United States
- Language: English
- Budget: $20 million
- Box office: $2.7 million

Hellboy: The Crooked Man is a 2024 American superhero horror film, based on the Dark Horse Comics character Hellboy created by Mike Mignola. Produced by Millennium Media, Dark Horse Entertainment, Nu Boyana Film Studios, and Campbell Grobman Films, it is the second reboot of the Hellboy film series and is the fourth live-action entry in the franchise. It is directed by Brian Taylor from a script he wrote with Mignola and Christopher Golden, adapting The Crooked Man limited series written by Mignola. The film stars Jack Kesy as Hellboy, alongside Jefferson White and Adeline Rudolph in her film debut.

Filming began in March 2023, in Bulgaria, and was completed in May. Hellboy: The Crooked Man was released in Belgium on June 20, 2024, and was released direct-to-VOD in the United States by Ketchup Entertainment on October 8, 2024. The film received mixed reviews from critics and has grossed $2.7 million in international markets.

== Plot ==
In 1959, B.P.R.D. senior agent Hellboy and rookie Bobbie Jo Song are escorting a train carrying a mystical spider entity back to Bureau headquarters. However, when they cross the Appalachian Mountains, the spider suddenly enlarges to monstrous proportions, forcing their train car to overturn and allowing it to escape. Hellboy surmises that the spider grew due to something evil haunting the area, admitting that he heard it calling to him. Left stranded, Hellboy and Bobbie Jo run into Tom Ferrell, a war veteran who's recently returned to atone for past sins. The agents accompany Tom to speak with Cora Fisher, a witch and Tom's ex-girlfriend, only to find Cora's "empty" body.

As they wait for the demonic familiar to return with Cora's "full" body, Tom informs the agents that he once met Effie Kolb, who told him the story of "The Crooked Man". At Effie's suggestion, Tom used a black cat carcass to make a pact with the Crooked Man, that whatever bone he held once the entity arrived would become his lucky bone. However, the sight of the Crooked Man terrified Tom enough to have a change of heart and discard the lucky bone, but it would always return and kept him safe from harm. Realizing that his actions enabled the Crooked Man to cross over to Earth, Tom has vowed to confront and destroy him. When the familiar reunites Cora's body, she reveals to Tom that the local witches want her soul.

To Tom's shock, Effie arrives on a white horse to collect Cora's soul. After Hellboy threatens Effie, Tom removes the horse’s bridle, and it suddenly transforms into Tom's estranged father as Effie escapes. Tom and his father reconcile briefly before he dies. The following morning, Tom, Cora, and the agents walk to a nearby church, owned by the blind Reverend Watts, to bury Tom's father, but Cora is attacked and killed by a demonic snake. Hellboy kills it, but its bites show him visions of his mother Sara, a witch who conceived him after willingly mating with an archdemon.

The survivors retreat inside the church, where they are confronted by the Crooked Man and his servants. Tom is tempted to return his lucky bone, but Hellboy stops him. As Hellboy battles the demonic horde, the Crooked Man attempts to entice the Reverend with eternal youth and sight in exchange for giving up Tom. Watts refuses to give in to temptation and blesses a shovel with the bone so Hellboy can use it to destroy the Crooked Man's servants and weaken him.

Hellboy and Tom chase the Crooked Man to an abandoned mansion but are assaulted with traumatic visions. Bobbie Jo, believing the Crooked Man draws power from the town's mines, enters a tunnel system through a hatch in the church floor, accompanied by Reverend Watts. A flock of demonic birds kill the old man, but Bobbie Jo is able to dispel the captive souls feeding the Crooked Man with magic, which frees Hellboy and Tom from the visions and enables them to vanquish the demon.

In the aftermath, Effie ages rapidly from losing her own eternal youth; to save her, Tom fits her with his father's enchanted bridle. Hellboy and Bobbie Jo are rescued, Tom feels a weight has been lifted from his soul, and a white horse wanders with a warning painted on its hide: "Beware! I am a Witch!".

== Cast ==
- Jack Kesy as Hellboy, a powerful, gentle-natured and heroic demon raised by humans, who works for the government organization B.P.R.D. He is frequently dispatched to handle missions or assignments involving paranormal entities and phenomena.
- Martin Bassindale as The Crooked Man, a supernatural entity haunting the Appalachian Mountains.
- Jefferson White as Tom Ferrell, an ex-soldier who encountered The Crooked Man during his childhood.
- Adeline Rudolph as Bobbie Jo Song, a rookie B.P.R.D. agent and Hellboy's partner. Song is an original character not seen in the comics.
- Leah McNamara as Effie Kolb, an acolyte of The Crooked Man.
- Joseph Marcell as Reverend Nathaniel Armstrong Watts, a religious pastor.
- Hannah Margetson as Cora Fisher, a witch and Tom's ex-girlfriend

== Production ==
In February 2023, Millennium Media announced plans for a new live-action reboot titled Hellboy: The Crooked Man, the first in a potential series of films. Brian Taylor directed the film from a script by comics creator Mike Mignola and frequent collaborator Christopher Golden, based on the 2008 comic miniseries of the same name. The film was co-produced by Nu Boyana Film Studios and Campbell Grobman Films and is presented by Millennium Media in association with Dark Horse Entertainment.

Taylor expressed his intentions to "reset" the film series and depict a younger and wandering version of Hellboy with a folk horror influence similar to the comics; Taylor also confirmed that the film would be R-rated in order to embrace the "dark and scary and violent and adult" elements of the comics. The following month, Jack Kesy was announced to portray Hellboy, and Jefferson White and Adeline Rudolph were cast as Tom Ferrell and Bobbie Jo Song. In September, Ketchup Entertainment announced that it would distribute the film, as well as Joseph Marcell, Leah McNamara, Hannah Margetson, and Martin Bassindale were cast in undisclosed roles.

Principal photography began in March 2023, in Bulgaria, and wrapped on May 15. In February 2024, Millennium Media president Jonathan Yunger stated that, after a practical special effect for a film's demon character proved disappointing, he used generative artificial intelligence to make numerous replacement creature designs, which were passed on to visual effects. A Motion Picture Association article reported that this occurred on the film Hellboy: The Crooked Man; however, in May 2024, the film's director Brian Taylor said that Yunger had been misquoted, and had been referring to the earlier film The Offering.

Taylor said that for Hellboy: The Crooked Man, no AI tools were used in pre-production or elsewhere, and that the characters of both Hellboy and the Crooked Man were created and shot practically, with no CGI enhancements.

== Music ==
Hellboy: The Crooked Man (Original Motion Picture Soundtrack)

Soundtrack album by Sven Faulconer
- Released: November 8, 2024
- Genre: Horror
- Length: 76:52
- Label: BMG

Hellboy: The Crooked Man (Original Motion Picture Soundtrack) is the soundtrack album for the film. Sven Faulconer composed the film's score. The soundtrack was released on November 8, 2024, by BMG.

All music is composed by Sven Faulconer.

No.	Title	Length
1.	"I Am the Heebie Jeebies"	3:33
2.	"The Stink"	2:18
3.	"What Happened to Him?"	1:31
4.	"He Weren't Never Much Good"	1:55
5.	"Witchballs"	1:56
6.	"Cora's House"	3:15
7.	"My Mother Was a Witch"	4:35
8.	"Cora's Skin"	2:50
9.	"Effie Kolb"	4:36
10.	"It Needs to Touch Your Heart"	1:22
11.	"Ouroboros"	2:58
12.	"Am I Dead?"	4:06
13.	"I Used the Lucky Bone"	1:04
14.	"The Reverend"	2:21
15.	"A Deal's a Deal"	0:46
16.	"We're On His Time"	0:59
17.	"The Church Part 1 – Locked and Loaded"	5:20
18.	"The Church Part 2 – Negotiations"	2:20
19.	"The Church Part 3 – They All Gonna Die"	5:10
20.	"Sinners"	2:07
21.	"Holy Shovel"	2:12
22.	"These Hills"	0:56
23.	"Mr. Onselm's House"	6:34
24.	"Effie and Tom"	1:04
25.	"All Us Witches"	3:28
26.	"That’s All for You"	3:11
27.	"The Power Was with You"	2:10
28.	"I Know Something You're Afraid Of"	0:46
29.	"Trouble in Mind – Cowboy Roy Brown"	1:29
Total length:		76:52

== Release ==
Hellboy: The Crooked Man had a limited theatrical release in international markets, beginning in Belgium on June 20, 2024, and the United Kingdom on September 27. It was released direct-to-VOD in the United States by Ketchup Entertainment on October 8, 2024.

In the United Kingdom, the film received a special 4K UHD Blu-ray release via Icon Film Distribution on December 9, 2024. In the United States, the film was released on Blu-ray and DVD via Ketchup Entertainment on December 17, 2024. The film also made its streaming debut on Hulu on March 7, 2025.

== Reception ==
=== Box office ===
Hellboy: The Crooked Man has grossed $2.7 million from international markets.

=== Critical response ===
The film received mixed reviews from critics. On the review aggregator website Rotten Tomatoes, 40% of 42 critics' reviews are positive, with an average rating of 4.9/10. The website's consensus reads: "Hellboy: The Crooked Man buckles under its constraints resulting in an uneven, third-rate bag of all tricks and no treats." Metacritic, which uses a weighted average, assigned the film a score of 44 out of 100, based on eight critics, indicating "mixed or average" reviews.

Sandra Hall of The Sydney Morning Herald gave the film 2/5 stars, writing, "It's all too much. The horrors are piled on in such quantities that any possibility of being scared or even slightly repulsed soon evaporates." The Guardian's Leslie Felperin also gave it 2/5 stars, writing, "No amount of budget could make up for the sputtering mess of a script, or the dead-on-the-inside expressions of the cast – apart from Rudolph who is consistently watchable." Variety's Siddhant Adlakha said the film "has the look of YouTube fan film — not to mention the excess fidelity, aping the story beats of Mike Mignola's eponymous comic to a tee."

Joel Harley of Starburst gave the film a positive review, stating "what The Crooked Man lacks in blockbuster bombast, this ambitious comic book adaptation makes up for with gothic chills and bloody action straight out of an Evil Dead film." Jamie Graham of GamesRadar+ gave the film 3 stars out of 5, writing "The Crooked Man is at its best in a flavoursome first half that serves up crepuscular, shallow-focus photography and backwoods dialect as tangy and prickly as wild gooseberries. But as it wears on, the film descends into a couple of extended set-piece battles. Some sore-thumb CGI amid largely practical effects, and the odd gimmicky edit, are further impediments."
