= Hellboy: The Crooked Man and Others =

2008 comic book trade paperback

- Trade Paperback Cover

Publication information
- Publisher: Dark Horse Comics
- Format: Limited series
- Genre: Horror

Creative team
- Created by: Mike Mignola
- Written by: Mike Mignola, Joshua Dysart
- Artist(s): Richard Corben, Jason Shawn Alexander, Duncan Fegredo
- Letterer: Clem Robins
- Colorist: Dave Stewart
- Editor: Scott Allie

Collected editions
- Hellboy: The Crooked Man and Others: ISBN 978-1-59582-477-6

Hellboy: The Crooked Man and Others is the tenth collected edition of Mike Mignola's comic book series Hellboy, collecting Hellboy: The Crooked Man #1–3, Hellboy: In the Chapel of Moloch, Hellboy: They That Go Down to the Sea in Ships and the story "The Mole" from "Free Comic Book Day 2008: Hellboy". The collected edition features an introduction by Gahan Wilson. As with Hellboy stories generally, it was published by Dark Horse Comics.

== The Crooked Man ==
The Crooked Man, scripted by Mignola with art by Richard Corben, was first published from July 2008 through September 2008 as issues 1–3 of an eponymous limited series. The issues were numbered 33 through 35 of the overarching Hellboy series.

Wandering in the Appalachian Mountains in 1958 (after "finishing up some stuff down South"), Hellboy encounters Tom Ferrell, a native of the region returning for the first time in decades to atone for his youthful initiation as a witch. Ferrell has never practiced magic but carries a "witch-bone" which has gotten him safely through his travels and his service in World War II. They befriend Cora Fisher, a witch driven to magic by personal tragedy, and encounter Effie Kolb, the youthful-appearing witch who first initiated Tom, who brought Tom his dying father whom she turned into a horse that she rode to death. Tom resolves to take his father's corpse to a church up in "The Hurricane", a part of the mountain dominated by "The Crooked Man", an eighteenth-century miser and war profiteer named Jeremiah Witkins who was hanged for his crimes yet returned from Hell as the region's resident Devil. Tom invites Hellboy to accompany him and Cora, helping to save the girl's soul while knowing he can never escape the Crooked Man.

Tom and Hellboy discuss the latter's burden as being many times worse than Tom's but which he hasn't started to feel yet. They try to take Cora through a region of coal mines, but it was infested with deformed cannibal witches descended from the Roanoke colony since the mines' collapse in 1902. Cora can hear the witches calling her, Tom assuring her that they are safe during the day despite the Hurricane being "on the devil's time" and night falls immediately. Cora explodes into a shower of small demonic animals from whom Tom and Hellboy are only saved by Tom's first use of his witch-bone. They arrive at the church to find Cora's ghost waiting for them, and the church's pastor, blind Reverend Watts, who tries to persuade Tom that his soul can still be saved. Effie and the region's witches surround the church grounds which they cannot enter, calling to Ferrell to join them as the Crooked Man arrives and demand Tom to pay his debt.

The Crooked Man attempted to tempt Watt's assistance with gold, youth and sight and then appeal to Hellboy's demonic nature, revealing he is after the bone in Tom's possession. After Watts infuses the holy spirit into the bone, he and Tom burn a cross onto a shovel's spade for Hellboy to use to dispatch the Crooked Man with the witches fleeing. The morning after Tom's father is given a proper burial, Tom and Hellboy go up to Witkins' mansion to finish him off. Witkins – appearing in his true form as a monstrous, demonic crab creature – sits clutching the souls of his victims which appear as gold coins in jars. Tom tosses him his witchbone which sends him back to Hell, later finding Effie reduced to a feeble old woman from losing her power. Tom ignores her pleas for mercy and puts the magic bridle on her, turning her into a nag with "BEWARE! I AM A WITCH!" painted on her side.

== "They That Go Down to the Sea in Ships" ==
They That Go Down to the Sea in Ships, written by Mignola and Josh Dysart with art by Jason Shawn Alexander, was published by Dark Horse in 2007 for limited free distribution to promote Konami's Hellboy: The Science of Evil video game. The story pits Hellboy and Abe Sapien against the ghost of the pirate Blackbeard. The title is from Psalm 107: "They that go down to the sea in ships, that do business in great waters/These see the works of the LORD, and his wonders in the deep."

Newburyport, Massachusetts, 1986 – Marc Arrow, a waterfront fortune teller, finds a truncated skull in an antique shop when the cabinet containing it spontaneously topples over – touching it brings him his first legitimate psychic vision and so he kills the proprietor with a handy sextant and steals it. A month later the BPRD are staking out North Carolina's Ocracoke Island, the antique dealer's ghost (communicating via medium) having tipped them off to the theft of what they realize is the skull of the legendary pirate. A walkie-talkie carrying Abe Sapien encounters a robed figure sitting on the beach which legend has haunted by Blackbeard's headless body, while in a motorboat approaching the beach a local historian fills Hellboy in on the known history of Blackbeard's death and of his skull, passed down from owner to owner as a macabre drinking goblet. Marc has partnered with criminal Whitey Pacelli to bring him to the island – the ghost appears, and when Marc insists on negotiating with it himself, Whitey shoots him. His partner dead, Whitey attempts to hold the head for ransom but Blackbeard's body bisects him with a cutlass. Hellboy confronts the re-formed Blackbeard and is shot in the shoulder. Meanwhile, Abe finds he is talking to the undead body of one of Blackbeard's victims, as more gather in the surf. They swim off after Blackbeard and Abe follows. Hellboy punches off Blackbeard's head and the body nearly kills the historian when he reaches for it. Hellboy and Blackbeard fight in the water and Blackbeard invites Hellboy to join him as a pirate, to which Hellboy replies with a deadpan "Let me think about it." Blackbeard's dead victims rise around Blackbeard and drag him into the water – Abe, who had swum to the location, sees Blackbeard's body pulled into the depths, its head dragged behind it in one hand and screaming a stream of bubbles. Abe greets Hellboy who comments "Everybody loves a pirate", and they head back to the mainland.

== In the Chapel of Moloch ==
In The Chapel of Moloch, story and art by Mignola, was first published in October 2008 as a one-shot issue of Hellboy (numbered Hellboy issue #36 on the inside front cover).

Tavira, Portugal, 1992. Hellboy and a New York art promoter visit the home which the latter has rented for his friend and protégé Jerry, an American painter meant to be preparing work for an important gallery show. Jerry has been working in the old chapel attached to the premises, but has stopped painting and turned to sculpting a gigantic bull-headed humanoid in clay which (based on his now-incoherent mumblings) depicts the deity Moloch. At night when the sculpts, the non-lockable chapel doors will nevertheless not open. Jerry is asleep in the house as they investigate the chapel, full of Jerry's paintings, and Hellboy notes that Jerry is "ripping off Goya", prompting the promoter's retort that Jerry, in reappropriating Goya for relevant modern work, is "saving Goya's ass!" which Hellboy seems to find unconvincing.

Hellboy investigates the sculpture whose clay bleeds when poked with a trowel. Elsewhere in the chapel he finds a mark of the Knights of St. Hagan (a fictional analogue to the Knights Templar) of the sort left by their investigators at sites where they've stamped out serious occult practice. The two wait inside the chapel for Jerry to arrive. When he does, a minuscule hunched corpse climbs up onto his shoulders from out of a hole in the floor. As it whispers to Jerry (who begins to decorate the sculpture's base with a motif of corpses in fire), Hellboy produces a relic from his pockets, "a silver button from the coat Bishop Zrinyi was wearing when he fought the Carpathian goat" and tosses it into the corpse's eye, lighting up the inside of its skull and making it run about in agony.

As the corpse topples senseless back into its hole, the Moloch statue comes to life and Hellboy readies to destroy it while a re-awakened Jerry shouts "No! Don't do it! The paintings aren't working! I'm just ripping off Goya!" When Hellboy shatters the sculpture a giant beating heart is revealed whose aortas and ventricles start to extend into tentacles as (over Jerry's protesting screams) Hellboy shoots it. Jerry laments that he'll never paint again, to Hellboy's immediate and expressed approval. "Also stay away from sculpture." He tells Jerry's friend to have their landlord do something about the hole in the floor.

== "The Mole" ==
"The Mole", written by Mignola with art by Duncan Fegredo, was first published as a story in the 2008 Free Comic Book Day free Hellboy comic. It takes place shortly before Hellboy: Darkness Calls.

England, the home of Darkness Calls' Harry Middleton. A drunken Hellboy is playing cards with Middleton and two other ghosts, who notice a mole on his hand. He wakes up alone at the table to find that the mole has gotten bigger. It rapidly swells to his own size and bursts to reveal another demon, who emerges from the boil leaving nothing of Hellboy but his empty skin and his apocalyptically powerful stone right hand. Hellboy's skin tears away from the hand and blows out the window, finally coming to rest on a weathervane across town. Left alone in the room, the demon takes the stone hand and begins to use it to end the world. At that moment Hellboy awakens, for real this time, back at the table. He empties his shotglass, and, reassuring himself that it was "just a dream", refills it.

== Addenda ==
The collected edition featured a section of Dysart's, Mignola's and Corben's preparatory sketches for the collected stories, and an essay by John Pelan entitled "Manly Wade Wellman: American Mythmaker", introducing readers to the pulp writer to whom The Crooked Man was written in tribute.

== Film adaptation ==
Following the underperformance and negative reception of the 2019 reboot film Hellboy, in February 2023, Millennium Media announced plans for a new live-action reboot titled Hellboy: The Crooked Man, the first in a potential series of films. Brian Taylor directed from a script by Mignola and Christopher Golden, based on the 2008 comic of the same name. The film was co-produced between Nu Boyana and Campbell Grobman Film and was presented by Millennium Media in association with Dark Horse Entertainment. Taylor expressed his intentions to "reset" the film series and depict a younger and wandering version of Hellboy with a folk horror influence similar to the comics; Taylor also confirmed that the film would be R-rated in order to embrace the "dark and scary and violent and adult" elements of the comics. The following month, Jack Kesy was announced to portray Hellboy, and Jefferson White and Adeline Rudolph were cast as Tom Ferrell and Bobbie Jo Song. The film was released direct-to-VOD in the United States on October 8, 2024.
