= B.P.R.D.: Plague of Frogs =

Comic book

- Trade Paperback Cover by Mike Mignola

Publication information
- Publisher: Dark Horse Comics
- Format: Trade paperback
- Genre: Action/adventure, horror
- Publication date: February 23, 2005
- Main characters: Kate Corrigan; Johann Kraus; Roger; Abe Sapien; Liz Sherman

Creative team
- Created by: Mike Mignola
- Written by: Mike Mignola
- Artist: Guy Davis
- Letterer: Clem Robins
- Colorist: Dave Stewart
- Editor: Scott Allie

Collected editions
- 'B.P.R.D.: Plague of Frogs': ISBN 978-1-59307-288-9

B.P.R.D.: Plague of Frogs is the third trade paperback collection in the B.P.R.D. series.

== Publication history ==
B.P.R.D.: Plague of Frogs was originally published from March 2004 through to July 2004 as a five-issue B.P.R.D. comic book miniseries, written by Mike Mignola with art by Guy Davis and published by Dark Horse comics. Each issue featured a cover by Guy Davis.

Editor Scott Allie stated that this series goes back to the roots of the Hellboy series concept, which Mignola originally conceived of as a team book until the character of Hellboy took over and dominated the book, and although previous B.P.R.D. stories had been told this was the first to be written solely by Mignola himself.

Allie also added that whilst this story and subsequent mini-series would see the title develop more along the lines of a standard ongoing series, albeit one with regular breaks, it would go against the conventions of the comic book industry to profoundly change the fictionalised world in which it is set forever.

== Plot synopsis ==
=== Chapter 1 ===
The B.P.R.D.'s enhanced talents taskforce are called in to investigate when Professor Derby infiltrates a classified research facility in New Jersey and shoots dead Dr. Platt who has been working on scientific research into fungi and has grown a giant specimen in the lab.

=== Chapter 2 ===
Abe, Kate, Liz, Roger, and Johann have returned to B.P.R.D. headquarters with a captured frog monster and Director Manning reveals that the spore Dr. Platt had based his experiments on had recently been recovered from the ruins of Cavendish Hall and belong to the monstrous Sadu-Hem.

=== Chapter 3 ===
The team crash at Crab Point, Michigan. Roger is strung up by a frog monster and Johann is dispersed leaving Kate to search for help whilst Abe and Liz face the demonic priest of Sadu-Hem who has summoned forth the frog monsters.

=== Chapter 4 ===
The entire town of Crab Point, Michigan has been converted into frog monsters and it is left to Liz to rescue Kate from a graveyard of revenants whilst Sapien faces execution at the behest of Rasputin who seeks revenge for Abe Sapien's involvement in his own death at Cavendish Hall years before.

=== Chapter 5 ===
Kate, Liz, and Johann (temporarily inhabiting the rotting corpse of a dead dog) rush to save Abe whilst he hovers between life and death experiencing a mystical vision in which he witnesses his own origins as an undersea explorer called Caul caught up in the assassination of Abe Lincoln.

== Collected Editions ==
=== Trade Paperback ===
The trade paperback includes an eight-page sketchbook with art from Davis and one page of thumbnails and scripts by Mignola:

- B.P.R.D.: Plague of Frogs
  (144 pages, February 23, 2005, ISBN 978-1-59307-288-9)

=== B.P.R.D Omnibus Edition ===
The trade was later collected as a part of the Plague of Frogs cycle in the B.P.R.D. Omnibus format, along with Hollow Earth & Other Stories and The Soul of Venice & Other Stories. This format is available in both hardcover and paperback editions.

- B.P.R.D. Plague of Frogs - Volume 1
  (408 pages, January 19, 2011, ISBN 978-1-59582-609-1)
