= Hellboy: Strange Places =

2006 Hellboy comic collection

- Trade Paperback Cover

Publication information
- Publisher: Dark Horse Comics
- Format: Trade Paperback
- Genre: Action/adventure, horror
- Publication date: April 26, 2006
- Main character: Hellboy

Creative team
- Created by: Mike Mignola
- Written by: Mike Mignola
- Artist: Mike Mignola
- Letterer: Clem Robins
- Colorist: Dave Stewart
- Editor: Scott Allie

Collected editions
- Hellboy: Strange Places: ISBN 978-1-59307-475-3

Hellboy: Strange Places is the sixth trade paperback collection in the Hellboy series created by Mike Mignola published by Dark Horse Comics on April 26, 2006 which collects the mini-series The Third Wish and The Island featuring fictional paranormal detective Hellboy.

== Contents ==
=== The Third Wish ===
This story by Mike Mignola was originally published in a two-issue mini-series, Hellboy: The Third Wish (July–August 2002). Due to Mignola's involvement in the first Hellboy film and other projects, this would be the last comic-book mini-series featuring Hellboy by the character's creator until Hellboy: The Island in 2005.

Hellboy's apparent destiny as the harbinger of the Apocalypse continues to attract supernatural attention. After seeking advice from a fabled African witch doctor, Hellboy dives to the treacherous ocean bottom. The Bog Roosh, a sinister sea hag, manages to capture him using an enchanted nail and a trio of flighty mermaids. The Bog Roosh then reveals her plan to prevent the end of the world by dismembering Hellboy and sending his Right Hand to the deepest depths, robbing the Ogdru Jahad of their key into this world. With the help of the third mermaid, Hellboy manages to defeat the hag, but is lost beneath the sea for two years.

=== The Island ===
This story by Mike Mignola was originally published in a two-issue mini-series, Hellboy: The Island (June–July 2005) was the first by the character's creator since The Third Wish in 2002.

After washing up on the shores of an unknown island, Hellboy inadvertently resurrects an ancient mystic who alone holds the knowledge of the secret history of the universe. The origins of God, angels, the Earth, the Ogdru Jahad, and their spawn are revealed, as well as the exact source of the Right Hand of Doom. Unfortunately for the mystic, he has been brought back to life by Hellboy's blood and is driven insane by its demonic nature. Hellboy manages to defeat the increasingly malevolent being, as well as destroy the gargantuan Urgo-Hem, an Ogdru Jahad spawn that prowls the island. These struggles are watched with great interest by the Daoine Sidh, especially a certain changeling with an old grudge against Hellboy. The denizens of this faerie kingdom realize that Hellboy has left whatever destined path was meant for him, but none seem to doubt that the Ogdru Jahad will make use of his Hand in one way or another. The goddess Hecate seems content to simply wait for the end of the world to which she will bear witness, but Gruagach the changeling will not bow out of existence peacefully.

== Awards and nominations ==
- The character Hellboy in The Third Wish was runner-up for the 2002 "Favourite Hero" Wizard Fan Award.
- Dave Stewart won the 2003 "Best Colorist/Coloring" Eisner Award in part for his work on The Third Wish.
- The trade paperback collection was nominated for the 2007 "Favourite Foreign Comic Book or Graphic Novel of the Year" Ledger Award.
