= Matthew Dow Smith =

American comic book artist

- Areas: Writer, Penciller, Inker
- Pseudonyms: Matt Smith, Matthew Smith, Teg Smith

Matthew Dow Smith (sometimes credited as Matthew Smith) is an American comic book artist.

== Bibliography ==
- Astronauts in Trouble: Live From the Moon #1 and #2
- Bad Luck Chuck #1-5 (Dark Horse)
- The Book of Fate #11
- Day of Judgment #1-5
- Dead Kings #1-4 (Aftershock)
- Deathlok #6
- Doctor Who (ongoing series) #3-6 (2009)
- Generation X #62
- Hellboy: Box Full of Evil
- The Keep #1-5
- Mirror's Edge #1
- Negative Burn #1
- Nightcrawler (Vol 2, 2002) #1-4
- The October Girl (2012, writer and artist)
- The Path #9-10,13-17,19-20
- Randy Bowen's Decapitator #3
- Sandman Mystery Theatre #45-48
- Sentinels of Magic
- Shock the Monkey #2
- Showcase '96 #4-5
- Starman #11 (vol 2, 1995) & #42 (vol 2, 1998)
- Stormwatch: Post Human Division #5 (with Christos Gage, 2007, Wildstorm, collected in Stormwatch: Post Human Division Volume 2, 144 pages, April 2008, ISBN 1-4012-1678-1)
- Supernatural: Origins
- Supreme: The Return #3-4
- Timeslip: The Coming of the Avengers #1
- Uncanny X-Men #400

== See also ==
- List of American comics creators
