= Hellboy: Seed of Destruction =

Comic book mini-series

- Cover of Hellboy: Seed of Destruction TPB.

Publication information
- Publisher: Legend (Dark Horse Comics)
- Schedule: Monthly
- Format: Mini-series
- Genre: Superhero
- Publication date: March – June 1994
- No. of issues: 4

Creative team
- Created by: Mike Mignola
- Written by: John Byrne; Mike Mignola
- Artist: Mike Mignola
- Letterer: Mike Mignola
- Colorist(s): Mark Chiarello; Matt Hollingsworth
- Editor: Barbara Kesel

Collected editions
- Seed of Destruction: ISBN 1-56971-316-2

Hellboy: Seed of Destruction is the first Hellboy comic book mini-series, published by Dark Horse Comics. It was conceived and illustrated by Mike Mignola and scripted by John Byrne. The comic served as the basis for the 2004 film Hellboy, directed by Guillermo del Toro.

The original print run also featured the origin story of Art Adams' Monkeyman and O'Brien as a series of backup shorts, but these have never been included in any of this title's reprints.

== Plot ==
In 1944, agents of Nazi Germany perform an occult ritual on an island off the coast of Scotland, led by a mysterious man in Satanic robes. At the same time, a group of U.S. Army commandos arrives at a ruined church in the English countryside on the guidance of the "British Paranormal Society". The Nazi ritual yields no apparent result, but a red-skinned boy-like demon suddenly appears at the church in a ball of fire. Trevor Bruttenholm, a member of the Society, inadvertently dubs the creature "Hellboy", and eventually decides to take Hellboy in and raise him like a son.

50 years later, Hellboy meets with Bruttenholm at the headquarters of the Bureau for Paranormal Research and Defense. Bruttenholm has been missing for two years after embarking on an expedition to the Arctic Circle with the three Cavendish brothers, descendants from a long line of expeditioners, and Sven Olafssen, a renowned Arctic explorer. Before he can fully recall what happened, Bruttenholm is attacked and killed by a huge amphibious frog-like monster. The creature then attacks Hellboy, but Hellboy shoots and kills it.

Following Bruttenholm's research, Hellboy journeys to Cavendish Hall, joined by two of his BPRD colleagues: Liz Sherman, a woman with volatile pyrokinetic powers, and Abe Sapien, an amphibious fish-like humanoid. They are greeted by Lady Emma Cavendish, the mother of the presumed-dead Cavendish brothers. Lady Emma explains that every male Cavendish for nine generations has died exploring the Arctic, beginning with Elihu Cavendish, a prosperous whaler who heard of a temple deep in the Arctic and vanished during a subsequent attempt to find it. After Lady Cavendish's butler escorts the group to their rooms, Abe dives into the lake surrounding the estate to investigate its flooded foundations. Over cell phone, Hellboy and Liz discuss the butler's identical appearance to Olafssen, who is also assumed dead.

Liz suddenly vanishes, and Hellboy confronts Olafssen in the hall, who instantly transforms into another frog-monster. The two fight through the house until Hellboy incapacitates Olafssen and finds Lady Cavendish dead. A shadowy figure emerges and identifies himself as Grigori Rasputin, who performed the Nazi ritual in 1944 and claims to be Hellboy's "master". Large tentacles then erupt from the floor and drag Hellboy beneath the manor. Beneath Cavendish Hall, Rasputin extolls to Hellboy the power of the Ogdru Jahad, seven primordial gods of chaos which empower him and render him immortal. Olafssen reappears at Rasputin's summoning and attacks Hellboy again. Meanwhile, Abe explores the caverns under Cavendish Hall that connect to the lake and discovers a hidden passage containing the well-preserved remains of Elihu Cavendish, sitting with a harpoon in his hand.

Rasputin explains that after he was murdered in 1916, the Ogdru Jahad resurrected him. He was eventually employed by the Third Reich to oversee one of Hitler's "Doomsday Projects", and he used the opportunity to attempt summoning the Ogdru Jahad to Earth. The resultant ritual failed and, without his knowledge, summoned Hellboy instead. After the project failed, Rasputin received a vision from Sadu Hem, a many-tentacled creature connected to the Ogdru Jahad and imprisoned in the Arctic. After journeying to find it encased in stone, Rasputin communed with it mentally while in an extended trance. Many years later, the Cavendish expedition discovered and accidentally awakened them both. Rasputin learned of Hellboy's existence by reading their minds and realized he could be used to complete the ritual. Rasputin then turned Olafssen and the Cavendishes into frog-monsters to serve him, and hypnotically instructed Bruttenholm to take Sadu Hem back to Cavendish Hall before killing him to lure in Hellboy. In the present, Rasputin reveals that he had Liz captured after discovering that the power within her exceeds Hellboy's. He begins siphoning off her power to use his own body as a conduit for Sadu Hem, who will in turn use the energy to shatter the Ogdru Jahad's extradimensional prisons and summon them to Earth.

Hellboy is overpowered by Olafssen, but barely manages to kill him. Rasputin is suddenly speared through the chest by Abe, who is being possessed by the vengeful ghost of Elihu Cavendish. With Rasputin's concentration broken, Liz's power flares out of control and lights the entire cavern on fire, immolating Sadu Hem and destroying the estate's foundations. Elihu's ghost relinquishes control of Abe and passes on, allowing Abe to carry Liz out of the crumbling cavern. Rasputin, furious, swears to kill Hellboy, but with his connection to the Ogdru Jahad severed, his body begins to disintegrate. He attempts to bargain for his life with Hellboy, leveraging his knowledge of Hellboy's true origins and promising repercussions, but Hellboy refuses and crushes Rasputin's skull, escaping the cavern as Cavendish Hall sinks into the lake. Back on the surface, Hellboy declines to tell Liz and Abe what Rasputin told him.

Meanwhile, in the ruins of a Nazi laboratory within an abandoned Norwegian castle, the bodies of Rasputin's three most devoted Nazi followers are frozen in ice. A machine activates, and the ice begins to thaw.

== Post-release ==
=== Collected editions ===
It was collected as the first Hellboy trade paperback, which has been reissued and published as a limited edition hardcover. The collection also includes the first two Hellboy short stories from San Diego Comic Con Comics #2 and Comics Buyer's Guide #1070 and a gallery of pinups from Simon Bisley, Mike Allred, Art Adams, Frank Miller, Fred Blanchard, and Gary Gianni.

- Seed of Destruction (Dark Horse Comics, TPB, 128 pages, 1994, ISBN 1-56971-316-2, 2004, ISBN 1-59307-094-2, hardcover, 1995, ISBN 1-56971-051-1)

=== Awards ===
- 1995:
  - Won "Best Graphic Album: Reprint" Eisner Award
  - Won "Best Writer/Artist" Eisner Award, for Mike Mignola

=== Film adaptation ===
Elements of the comic were adapted into the 2004 film Hellboy, directed by Guillermo del Toro.
