= Mike Mignola =

American comic artist and writer (born 1960)

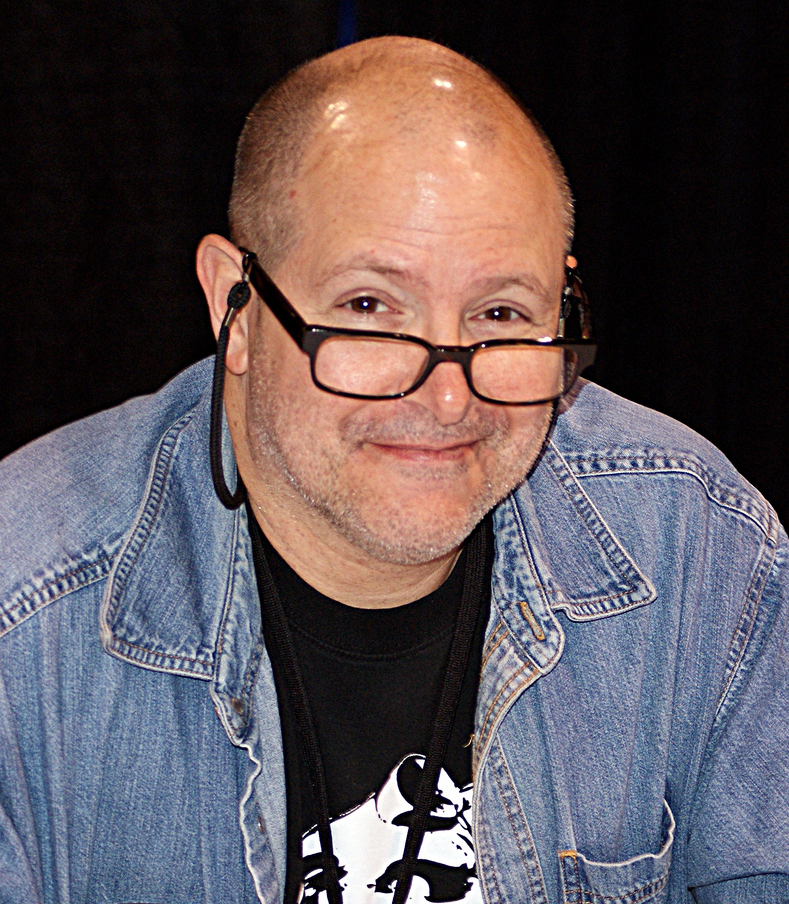
- Mignola in 2011
- Born: Michael Mignola; September 16, 1960 (age 66) Berkeley, California, U.S.
- Areas: Writer, Penciller, Inker
- Notable works: Hellboy; B.P.R.D. Cosmic Odyssey; Gotham by Gaslight
- Awards: Full list

Michael Mignola (/mɪnˈjoʊlə/; born September 16, 1960) is an American comic book writer and artist best known for creating Hellboy for Dark Horse Comics, part of a shared universe of titles including B.P.R.D., Abe Sapien, Lobster Johnson, and various spin-offs. He has also created other supernatural and paranormal themed titles for Dark Horse including Baltimore, Joe Golem, and The Amazing Screw-On Head.

== Early life ==
Mike Mignola was born September 16, 1960, in Berkeley, California. He was raised Catholic.

== Career ==
=== Marvel and DC ===
Mignola began his career in 1981 by illustrating spots in The Comic Reader. His first published piece was in The Comic Reader #183, a spot illustration of Red Sonja (pg. 9). His first published front cover was The Comic Reader #196 in November 1981. In 1982 he graduated from the California College of the Arts with a BFA in Illustration.

In 1983 he worked as an inker at Marvel Comics on Daredevil and Power Man and Iron Fist and later became the penciler on titles such as The Incredible Hulk, Alpha Flight, and the Rocket Raccoon limited series.

In 1987, he began working for DC Comics as well. He drew the Phantom Stranger and World of Krypton limited series. With writer Jim Starlin, Mignola produced the Cosmic Odyssey miniseries in 1988. Mignola drew covers for several Batman stories, including "Batman: A Death in the Family" and "Dark Knight, Dark City". Writer Brian Augustyn and Mignola crafted the Gotham by Gaslight one-shot in 1989.

Batman #429 cover by Mike Mignola

In an early 2000s interview, Mignola was asked if his 1988 cover art and cover text for Batman #428 anticipated the telephone vote for the death of the second Robin (Jason Todd). Mignola responded:

"It's so amazing to me that people are still talking about that damn thing. I didn't know if he was going to live or die, because I did the cover ahead of time. So the idea was: I'll draw him dead, and if he lives, then it's just a cover of him being badly hurt. I've gotta say---I don't think I was giving it a lot of thought. I never imagined I'd be talking about it all these years later."

When asked if fans continued to question him about that cover, Mignola replied, "You know, it does crop up. When people talk about my career, that is one of the covers that a lot of people kind of go back to. I wish I had something profound to say about it. But at the time, it was just another job." In contrast, Mignola did not address his cover illustration of the Joker, and the accompanying cover text, for Batman #429. His visual depiction of the Joker anticipated prospective advertisements for his work in Gotham by Gaslight, yet the cover text still adhered to the "Death in the Family" storyline. This Elseworlds Joker is only briefly discussed in Gotham by Gaslight as a man who married ten wealthy widows, poisoned all ten with strychnine, and then ingested the poison himself when police attempted an arrest, resulting in partial facial paralysis. Mignola included a black-and-white police sketch in Gotham by Gaslight that did not replicate his Batman #429 cover art, choosing instead to root that Elseworlds incarnation of the Joker in Conrad Veidt's 1928 portrayal of Gwynplaine for The Man Who Laughs. A scene from Tim Burton's Batman, released in June 1989 (United States), additionally featured Jack Nicholson's Joker in a top hat, but without a monocle.

Through the early 1990s, Mignola worked on covers and backup features for various DC and Marvel Comics. He collaborated twice with writer Howard Chaykin. In 1990–1991, they produced the Fafhrd and the Gray Mouser limited series for Epic Comics, with inker Al Williamson. This was followed with the Ironwolf: Fires of the Revolution graphic novel in 1992.

=== Hellboy and related spinoffs ===
==== Hellboy ====
Prior to 1994, Mignola's career had been spent doing work-for-hire illustration for corporate publishers. That year, Dark Horse Comics released Hellboy: Seed of Destruction, Mignola's creator-owned project. Though he wrote the story himself, it was scripted by John Byrne. The next Hellboy story, The Wolves of Saint August, was completely written and drawn by Mignola. Since then all Hellboy stories have been written solely by Mignola with the exception of They That Go Down to the Sea in Ships, which was co-written by Joshua Dysart.

Makoma (2006) was the first Hellboy story not drawn by Mignola, featuring the art of Richard Corben. Corben would return to draw many flashback stories for the series. Other artists have also had a hand in drawing flashback stories including Jason Shawn Alexander, Kevin Nowlan and Scott Hampton. In 2007, following after 2005's The Island, British artist Duncan Fegredo took over art duties on the ongoing story arc of Hellboy from Darkness Calls onwards.

Mignola returned as the full-time artist for Hellboy in 2012 for the series' conclusion, Hellboy in Hell.

==== Abe Sapien ====
In 1998 the first Hellboy spinoff, Abe Sapien, was launched. It was not written by Mike Mignola, but it did feature his Hellboy short story "Heads" as a back-up. Abe Sapien did not take off properly until a decade later in 2008's The Drowning. Since then, the series has had several short stories. Beginning in 2013, it became an ongoing series with Scott Allie as the lead writer alongside Mignola.

==== Lobster Johnson ====
Lobster Johnson was the next spinoff, debuting as a back-up feature in 1999's Box Full of Evil. The series got its own title later in 2007's Lobster Johnson: The Iron Prometheus. It returned again with the miniseries The Burning Hand in 2012, followed by various short stories.

==== B.P.R.D. ====
B.P.R.D. was the third spinoff, but it was the first one which was conceived to be more than just a one-off side story, but rather a series of stories. It began with 2002's Hollow Earth, which continued on from Hellboy: Conqueror Worm. Beyond that followed a series of short stories designed to explore what the B.P.R.D. series could be. 2004's Plague of Frogs was the story that solidified what the series was, and would set the direction for future books to come, so much so that the first major story cycle is collected in omnibus editions titled B.P.R.D.: Plague of Frogs. A vast majority of the stories in this era were co-written with John Arcudi and drawn by Guy Davis.

B.P.R.D.: Hell on Earth is the main series continuing after the catastrophic events at the conclusion of the Plague of Frogs cycle. Guy Davis left the series in 2011 with the conclusion of Hell on Earth: Gods. Tyler Crook became the new ongoing artist beginning with Hell on Earth: Monsters, but he is joined by several regular artists, most notably James Harren and Laurence Campbell.

Continuing where Hell on Earth left off, The Devil You Know is written by Mike Mignola and Scott Allie with Laurence Campbell serving as the regular artist.

==== Sir Edward Grey, Witchfinder ====
Sir Edward Grey, Witchfinder (more commonly known simply as "Witchfinder") began with a teaser story in 2008's MySpace Dark Horse Presents #16, followed by a full miniseries in 2009. It follows the stories of the occult investigator, Sir Edward, agent of Queen Victoria.

==== Frankenstein ====
The Frankenstein began with Frankenstein Underground in 2015. Set in 1956, this miniseries follows Frankenstein (in the Hellboy Universe, the Frankenstein monster takes his father's name) as he ventures into the Pellucidar-like Hollow Earth. This also canonized Mary Shelley's novel Frankenstein; or, The Modern Prometheus. The series was further expanded in 2020 with Frankenstein Undone, a direct sequel to Shelley's novel.

==== Spinoff miniseries ====
Numerous spinoffs have been published that are set in the Hellboy universe:

- Sledgehammer 44: Set in World War II, this series is about the Epimetheus Vril Energy Suit created by Doctor Helena Gallargas.
- Frankenstein Underground: Set in 1956, this series follows the Frankenstein monster as he ventures into the Pellucidar-like Hollow Earth.
- Rise of the Black Flame: Set in 1923, this series explores how Raimund Diestel became the Black Flame.
- The Visitor: How & Why He Stayed: This series follows the life of an alien visitor set to kill the infant Hellboy in 1944.
- Rasputin: The Voice of the Dragon: Set in 1941, this series follows Trevor Bruttenholm as he becomes an agent for the allied forces in World war II.
- Koshchei the Deathless: Hellboy and Koshchei sit in a pub in Hell and chat.

=== The Outerverse ===
Baltimore began with a 2007 illustrated novel, and continued as a comic book series. It was created by Mike Mignola and Christopher Golden.

Like Baltimore, Joe Golem: Occult Detective began as an illustrated prose novel (2012's Joe Golem and the Drowning City) and later continued as a comic book series. It was created by Mike Mignola and Christopher Golden and exists in a shared universe with Baltimore called "The Outerverse".

== Style ==
Alan Moore has described Mignola's style as "German expressionism meets Jack Kirby". His style has also been likened to an amalgamation of Hal Foster and Alex Toth.

== Film and television ==
Mignola worked as an illustrator for Francis Ford Coppola's 1992 film Bram Stoker's Dracula. He was also the production designer for the Disney feature film Atlantis: The Lost Empire in 2001 and a concept artist for 2002's Blade II and Pixar's Brave.

Mignola was hired by Bruce Timm to provide character designs for Batman: The Animated Series in 1991. His redesign of Mr. Freeze was used for the series.

Mignola's design of the 1880s Batman costume from the comic Batman: Gotham by Gaslight appeared in Batman: The Brave and the Bold.

Hellboy was made into a feature film in 2004 by director Guillermo del Toro. Mignola was closely involved with the movie's production, and a sequel was released in 2008. Hellboy has been made into two direct-to-video animated films, Sword of Storms in 2006 and Blood and Iron in 2007.

Mignola's The Amazing Screw-On Head debuted in 2006 on the Sci-Fi Channel, starring the voices of Paul Giamatti and David Hyde Pierce.

Mignola worked on the script for the R-rated Hellboy reboot film (2019), that was directed by Neil Marshall, and starred David Harbour as Hellboy. Mignola also co-wrote the screenplay for a 2024 reboot film titled Hellboy: The Crooked Man alongside Chris Golden.

In 2022, Mignola's career was highlighted in the documentary Mike Mignola: Drawing Monsters. Directed by Kevin Konrad Hanna and Jim Demonakos, this documentary film explores Mignola's journey in creating the Hellboy series and features interviews with industry figures like Guillermo del Toro and Neil Gaiman. The documentary has been noted for its comprehensive portrayal of Mignola's impact on the worlds of comics and film.

== Personal life ==
As of 2014, Mignola resides in New York City with his wife and daughter.

Regarding the influence of his religious upbringing on his artwork, Mignola explained in a 2014 interview, "No, I don't believe in anything, really. Not on a conscious level. That is the beauty of it. I was raised Catholic. I was taught a bunch of stuff. I find religion fascinating, but at no time does any of that tie my hands. I get to play with stuff without getting too reverential. There's some Miltonian stuff to the geography of my Hell, the Hell I'm doing is much closer to the world I created in The Amazing Screw-On Head. It's this pile, this jumble of old buildings for the most part. It's entirely made out of everything I want to draw."

== Awards ==
- 1995:
  - Won "Best Writer/Artist" Eisner Award, for Hellboy: Seed of Destruction
  - Won "Best Graphic Album: Reprint" Eisner Award, for Hellboy: Seed of Destruction
  - Won "Best Artist" Harvey Awards
  - Won "Best Achievement by an Inker" Don Thompson Award
- 1996:
  - Won "Best Artist" Harvey Awards
  - Won "Best Graphic Album of Previously Released Material" Harvey Awards, for Hellboy: The Wolves of Saint August
- 1997:
  - Won "Best Writer/Artist" Eisner Award, for Hellboy: Wake the Devil
- 1998:
  - Won "Best Writer/Artist" Eisner Award, for Hellboy: Almost Colossus, Hellboy Christmas Special and Hellboy Jr. Halloween Special
- 2000:
  - Won "Best Artist" Harvey Award, for Hellboy: Box Full of Evil
- 2002:
  - Won "Best Finite Series/Limited Series" Eisner Award, for Hellboy: Conqueror Worm
- 2003:
  - Won "Best Humor Publication" Eisner Award, for The Amazing Screw-On Head
  - Won "Best Short Story" Eisner Award, for "The Magician and the Snake"
- 2004:
  - Won "Favourite Comics Writer/Artist" Eagle Award
  - Won "Best Comics-Related Book" Eisner Award, for The Art of Hellboy
  - Received "Inkpot Award"
- 2006:
  - Won "Favourite Comics Writer/Artist" Eagle Award
- 2007:
  - Won "Roll of Honour" Eagle Award
  - Won "Favourite Colour Comicbook – American" Eagle Award, for Hellboy: Darkness Calls
- 2008
  - Won "Best Cover Artist" Harvey Awards
  - Won "Award for Favourite Colour Comicbook – American" Eagle Award
  - Won "Roll of Honor" Eagle Awards
  - Won "Best Horror Comic Book" Rondo Hatton Classic Horror Awards, for Hellboy: In the Chapel of Moloch
- 2009
  - Won "Best Finite Series/Limited Series" Eisner Award, for Hellboy: The Crooked Man
  - Won "Best Graphic Album: Reprint" Eisner Award, for Hellboy Library Edition, vols. 1 and 2
  - Won "Best Publication Design" Eisner Award, for Hellboy Library Edition, vols. 1 and 2
  - Won "All-in-One Award" Inkwell Awards
- 2010
  - Won "Best Cover Artist" Harvey Awards, for Hellboy: Bride of Hell
- 2011
  - Won "Favorite Writer/Artist" Eagle Award
  - Won "Favorite Artist:Inks" Eagle Award
  - Won "Best Single Issue (or One-Shot)" Eisner Award, for Hellboy: Double Feature of Evil
- 2019
  - Harvey Awards Hall of Fame inductee.
- 2025
  - Won Bram Stoker Award for Superior Achievement in a Graphic Novel for Bowling With Corpses and Other Tales from Lands Unknown.

== Bibliography ==
=== Comics ===
- Rocket Raccoon (artist, script by Bill Mantlo, inks by Al Gordon four-issue limited-series, Marvel Comics, 1985)
- Amazing High Adventure #3 - Short Story "Monkey See, Monkey Die" (script by Steve Englehart, anthology series, Marvel Comics, October 1986)
- The Chronicles of Corum #1–6, 9, 11-12 (artist, with Mike Baron and Mark Shainblum, First Comics, 1987)
- Phantom Stranger (artist, script by Paul Kupperberg, inks by P. Craig Russell four-issue limited series, DC Comics, 1987–1988)
- World of Krypton (artist, script by John Byrne, inks by Rick Bryant, four-issue limited series, DC Comics, 1987–1988)
- Cosmic Odyssey (artist, with writer Jim Starlin and inker Carlos Garzon, 1988, DC Comics, TPB, 226 pages, Titan Books, ISBN 1-84023-715-5, DC Comics ISBN 1-56389-051-8)
- Doctor Strange/Doctor Doom: Triumph and Torment (writer Roger Stern, art also by Mark Badger, 1989, Marvel Comics)
- Batman:
  - Gotham by Gaslight (pencils, with writer Brian Augustyn, and with inks by P. Craig Russell, DC Comics Elseworlds, TPB, 48 pages, 1989, Titan, ISBN 1-85286-265-3, DC, ISBN 0-930289-67-6)
  - Batman: Legends of the Dark Knight #54: "Sanctum" (pencils and story, with writer Dan Raspler, with letterer Willie Schubert, and with coloring by Mark Chiarello, single issue, DC, 1993)
  - Batman: The Doom That Came to Gotham (writer, three-issue mini-series, DC Comics Elseworlds, 2000)
- Wolverine: The Jungle Adventure (artist, with writer Walt Simonson and inker Bob Wiacek, single issue prestige format paperback, Marvel Comics, 1990)
- Fafhrd and the Gray Mouser (artist, with writer Howard Chaykin and inker Al Williamson, four-issue limited series, Epic Comics, 1990–1991) (re-issued in 2024)
- Ted McKeever's Metropol #9-11 (artist, with Ted McKeever "The Resurrection of Eddy Current", three-part mini-series, Epic Comics, 1991)
- Bram Stoker's Dracula: official movie adaptation (artist, with writer Roy Thomas and inker John Nyberg, four-issue mini-series Topps Comics 1992)
- Ironwolf: Fires of the Revolution (art, with writers Howard Chaykin and John Francis Moore, and artist P. Craig Russell, 104 pages, 1992, Titan Books, ISBN 1-56389-065-8, DC Comics, ISBN 1-56389-065-8)
- Ray Bradbury Comics #4 - Short Story "The City" (with letterer Willie Schubert, anthology series, Topps Comics, 1993)
- ZombieWorld: Champion of the Worms (writer, with art by Pat McEown, three-issue mini-series, 1997, Dark Horse, TPB, 80 pages, 1998, ISBN 1-56971-334-0, 2005, ISBN 1-59307-407-7)
- Jenny Finn: Doom Messiah (script, with art by Troy Nixey and Farel Dalrymple, TPB includes Jenny Finn #1–2, Oni Press, 1999, 128 pages, Boom! Studios, June 2008, ISBN 1-934506-14-1)
- The Amazing Screw-on Head and Other Curious Objects (Dark Horse, 2010) collecting:
  - The Amazing Screw-On Head (one shot comic book, 2002)
  - The Magician and the Snake (with Katie Mignola, published in Happy Endings anthology, 2002)
  - Abu Gung and the Beanstalk (originally drawn 1998, redrawn and expanded for this collection)
  - The Witch and Her Soul (drawn for this collection)
  - The Prisoner of Mars (drawn for this collection)
  - In the Chapel of Curious Objects (drawn for this collection)
- Baltimore (Dark Horse):
  - The Plague Ships (with Christopher Golden and Ben Stenbeck, 2010)
  - A Passing Stranger (with Christopher Golden and Ben Stenbeck for Free Comic Book Day, 2011)
  - The Curse Bells (with Christopher Golden and Ben Stenbeck, 2011)
  - Dr. Leskovar's Remedy (with Christopher Golden and Ben Stenbeck, 2012)
  - The Play (with Christopher Golden and Ben Stenbeck, 2012)
  - The Widow and the Tank (with Christopher Golden and Ben Stenbeck, 2013)
  - The Inquisitor (with Christopher Golden and Ben Stenbeck, 2013)
  - The Infernal Train (with Christopher Golden and Ben Stenbeck, 2013)
  - Chapel of Bones (with Christopher Golden and Ben Stenbeck, 2014)
  - The Witch of Harju (with Christopher Golden and Peter Bergting, 2014)
  - The Wolf and the Apostle (with Christopher Golden and Ben Stenbeck, 2014)
  - The Cult of the Red King (with Christopher Golden and Peter Bergting, 2015)
  - Empty Graves (with Christopher Golden and Peter Bergting, 2016)
  - The Red Kingdom (with Christopher Golden and Peter Bergting, 2017)
- Joe Golem: Occult Detective (Dark Horse):
  - The Rat Catcher (with Christopher Golden and Patric Reynolds, 2015)
  - The Sunken Dead (with Christopher Golden and Patric Reynolds, 2016)
  - The Outer Dark (with Christopher Golden and Patric Reynolds, 2017)
  - Flesh and Blood (with Christopher Golden and Patric Reynolds, 2017)
  - The Drowning City (with Christopher Golden and Peter Bergting, 2018)

==== Leonide the Vampyr (Dark Horse) ====
- Miracle at the Crow's Head (with Rachele Aragno, 2022)
- A Christmas for Crows (with Rachele Aragno, 2022)
- The House of Yonda #1 (with Rachele Aragno, 2026)
- The House of Yonda #2 (with Rachele Aragno, 2026)

==== Meinhardt and Knox (Dark Horse) ====
- Mr. Higgins Comes Home (with Warwick Johnson-Cadwell, Dark Horse, 2017)
- Our Encounters with Evil & Other Stories Library Edition (with Warwick Johnson-Cadwell, Dark Horse, 2023)
- Falconspeare (with Warwick Johnson-Cadwell, Dark Horse, 2022)

==== Lands Unknown (Dark Horse) ====
- Bowling with Corpses & Other Strange Tales from Lands Unknown (2025)
- Uri Tupka and the Gods (2026)
- Lands Unknown: The Skinless Man (with Ben Stenbeck, 2026)
- Uri Tupka and the Devils (upcoming, 2026)

==== Hellboy Universe (Dark Horse) ====
- Hellboy
  - Seed of Destruction (with John Byrne, 1994)
  - The Wolves of Saint August (1994)
  - The Corpse (1995)
  - The Chained Coffin (1995)
  - The Iron Shoes (1996)
  - Wake the Devil (1996)
  - Almost Colossus (1997)
  - A Christmas Underground (1997)
  - Heads (1998)
  - The Baba Yaga (1998)
  - The Right Hand of Doom (1998)
  - The Vârcolac (1999)
  - Goodbye Mr. Tod (1999)
  - Pancakes (1999)
  - Box Full of Evil (1999)
  - The Nature of the Beast (2000)
  - King Vold (2000)
  - Conqueror Worm (2001)
  - The Third Wish (2002)
  - Dr. Carp's Experiment (2003)
  - The Penanggalan (2004)
  - The Troll-Witch (2004)
  - The Ghoul (2005)
  - The Island (2005)
  - Makoma (with Richard Corben, 2006)
  - The Hydra and the Lion (2006)
  - They That Go Down to the Sea in Ships (with Joshua Dysart and Jason Shawn Alexander, 2007)
  - Darkness Calls (with Duncan Fegredo, 2007)
  - The Vampire of Prague (with P. Craig Russell, 2007)
  - The Mole (with Duncan Fegredo, 2008)
  - The Crooked Man (with Richard Corben, 2008)
  - In the Chapel of Moloch (2008)
  - The Wild Hunt (with Duncan Fegredo, 2008)
  - The Bride of Hell (with Richard Corben, 2009)
  - Hellboy in Mexico (with Richard Corben, 2010)
  - The Storm (with Duncan Fegredo, 2010)
  - The Whittier Legacy (2010)
  - Double Feature of Evil (with Richard Corben, 2010)
  - The Sleeping and the Dead (with Scott Hampton, 2010)
  - Buster Oakley Gets His Wish (with Kevin Nowlan, 2011)
  - Being Human (with Richard Corben, 2011, collected in B.P.R.D.: Being Human)
  - The Fury (with Duncan Fegredo, 2011)
  - House of the Living Dead (with Richard Corben, 2011)
  - Hellboy versus the Aztec Mummy (2011)
  - The Midnight Circus (with Duncan Fegredo, 2013)
  - Hellboy Gets Married (with Mick McMahon, 2013)
  - The Coffin Man (with Fábio Moon, 2014)
  - The Coffin Man 2: The Rematch (with Gabriel Bá, 2015)
  - Into the Silent Sea (with Gary Gianni, 2017)
  - Krampusnacht (with Adam Hughes, 2018)
- Hellboy in Hell:
  - The Descent (2012)
  - The Three Gold Whips (2013)
  - The Death Card (2014)
  - The Hounds of Pluto (2015)
  - The Exorcist of Vorsk (with Todd Mignola, 2015)
  - The Spanish Bride (2016)
  - For Whom the Bell Tolls (2016)
- Hellboy and B.P.R.D.:
  - 1952 (with John Arcudi and Alex Maleev, 2014)
  - 1953:
    - The Phantom Hand (with Ben Stenbeck, 2015)
    - The Kelpie (with Ben Stenbeck, 2015)
    - The Witch Tree (with Ben Stenbeck, 2015)
    - Rawhead and Bloody Bones (with Ben Stenbeck, 2015)
    - Wandering Souls (with Chris Roberson and Michael Walsh, 2016)
    - Beyond the Fences (with Chris Roberson, and Paolo and Joe Rivera, 2016)
  - 1954:
    - The Mirror (with Richard Corben, 2016)
    - Black Sun (with Chris Roberson and Stephen Green, 2016)
    - Unreasoning Beast (with Chris Roberson and Patric Reynolds, 2016)
    - Ghost Moon (with Chris Roberson and Brian Churilla, 2017)
  - 1955:
    - Secret Nature (with Chris Roberson and Shawn Martinbrough, 2017)
    - Occult Intelligence (with Chris Roberson and Brian Churilla, 2017)
    - Burning Season (with Chris Roberson, and Paolo and Joe Rivera, 2018)
- B.P.R.D.:
  - Hollow Earth (with Christopher Golden, Tom Sniegoski, Ryan Sook and Curtis Arnold, 2002)
  - The Soul of Venice (with Miles Gunther and Michael Avon Oeming, 2003)
  - Born Again (with John Arcudi and Guy Davis, 2004)
  - Plague of Frogs (with Guy Davis, 2004)
  - Another Day at the Office (with Cameron Stewart, 2004)
  - The Dead (with John Arcudi and Guy Davis, 2004)
  - The Black Flame (with John Arcudi and Guy Davis, 2005)
  - The Universal Machine (with John Arcudi and Guy Davis, 2006)
  - Garden of Souls (with John Arcudi and Guy Davis, 2007)
  - Killing Ground (with John Arcudi and Guy Davis, 2007)
  - 1946 (with Joshua Dysart and Paul Azaceta, 2008)
  - Revival (with John Arcudi and Guy Davis, 2008)
  - Bishop Olek’s Devil (with Joshua Dysart and Paul Azaceta, 2008)
  - Out of Reach (with John Arcudi and Guy Davis, 2008)
  - War on Frogs #1 (with John Arcudi, Herb Trimpe and Guy Davis, 2008)
  - The Ectoplasmic Man (with John Arcudi and Ben Stenbeck, 2008)
  - The Warning (with John Arcudi and Guy Davis, 2008)
  - War on Frogs #2 (with John Arcudi and John Severin, 2008)
  - The Black Goddess (with John Arcudi and Guy Davis, 2009)
  - And What Shall I Find There? (with Joshua Dysart and Patric Reynolds, 2009)
  - War on Frogs #3 (with John Arcudi and Karl Moline, 2009)
  - 1947 (with Joshua Dysart, Gabriel Bá and Fábio Moon, 2009)
  - War on Frogs #4 (with John Arcudi and Peter Snejbjerg, 2009)
  - King of Fear (with John Arcudi and Guy Davis, 2010)
  - The Dead Remembered (with Scott Allie, Karl Moline and Andy Owens, 2011)
  - Casualties (with John Arcudi and Guy Davis, 2011)
  - 1948 (with John Arcudi and Max Fiumara, 2012)
  - Vampire (with Gabriel Bá and Fábio Moon, 2013)
- B.P.R.D.: Hell on Earth:
  - New World (with John Arcudi and Guy Davis, 2010)
  - Gods (with John Arcudi and Guy Davis, 2011)
  - Seattle (with John Arcudi and Guy Davis, 2011)
  - Monsters (with John Arcudi and Tyler Crook, 2011)
  - Russia (with John Arcudi and Tyler Crook, 2011)
  - An Unmarked Grave (with John Arcudi and Duncan Fegredo, 2012)
  - The Long Death (with John Arcudi and James Harren, 2012)
  - The Pickens County Horror (with Scott Allie and Jason Latour, 2012)
  - The Devil’s Engine (with John Arcudi and Tyler Crook, 2012)
  - The Transformation of J.H. O'Donnell (with Scott Allie and Max Fiumara, 2012)
  - Exorcism (with Cameron Stewart, 2012)
  - The Return of the Master (with John Arcudi and Tyler Crook, 2012)
  - The Abyss of Time (with Scott Allie and James Harren, 2013)
  - A Cold Day in Hell (with John Arcudi and Peter Snejbjerg, 2013)
  - Wasteland (with John Arcudi and Laurence Campbell, 2013)
  - Lake of Fire (with John Arcudi and Tyler Crook, 2013)
  - Reign of the Black Flame (with John Arcudi and James Harren, 2014)
  - The Devil's Wings (with John Arcudi and Laurence Campbell, 2014)
  - The Broken Equation (with John Arcudi and Joe Querio, 2014)
  - Grind (with John Arcudi and Tyler Crook, 2014)
  - Flesh and Stone (with John Arcudi and James Harren, 2014)
  - Nowhere, Nothing, Never (with John Arcudi and Peter Snejbjerg, 2015)
  - Modern Prometheus (with John Arcudi and Julián Totino Tedesco, 2015)
  - End of Days (with John Arcudi and Laurence Campbell, 2015)
  - The Exorcist (with Camerson Stewart, Chris Roberson, and Mike Norton, 2016)
  - Cometh the Hour (with John Arcudi and Laurence Campbell, 2016)
- B.P.R.D.: The Devil You Know:
  - Messiah (with Scott Allie and Laurence Campbell, 2017)
  - Pandemonium (with Scott Allie, Sebastián Fiumara, and Laurence Campbell, 2018)
  - Ragna Rok (with Scott Allie, Laurence Campbell, and Christopher Mitten, 2018)
- Lobster Johnson:
  - The Iron Prometheus (with Jason Armstrong, 2007)
  - The Burning Hand (with John Arcudi and Tonči Zonjić, 2012)
  - Tony Masso’s Finest Hour (with John Arcudi and Joe Querio, 2012)
  - The Prayer of Neferu (with John Arcudi and Wilfredo Torres, 2012)
  - Caput Mortuum (with John Arcudi and Tonči Zonjić, 2012)
  - Satan Smells a Rat (with John Arcudi and Kevin Nowlan, 2013)
  - A Scent of a Lotus (with John Arcudi and Sebastián Fiumara, 2013)
  - Get the Lobster (with John Arcudi and Tonči Zonjić, 2014)
  - A Chain Forged in Life (with John Arcudi, Troy Nixey, and Kevin Nowlan, 2015)
  - The Glass Mantis (with John Arcudi and Toni Fejzula, 2015)
  - The Forgotten Man (with John Arcudi and Peter Snejbjerg, 2016)
  - Metal Monsters of Midtown (with John Arcudi and Tonči Zonjić, 2016)
  - Garden of Bones (with John Arcudi and Stephen Green, 2017)
  - The Pirate's Ghost (with John Arcudi and Tonči Zonjić, 2017)
  - Mangekyō (with John Arcudi and Ben Stenbeck, 2017)
- Abe Sapien:
  - The Drowning (with Jason Shawn Alexander, 2008)
  - The Haunted Boy (with John Arcudi and Patric Reynolds, 2009)
  - The Abyssal Plain (with John Arcudi and Peter Snejbjerg, 2010)
  - The Devil Does Not Jest (with John Arcudi and James Harren, 2011)
  - Dark and Terrible (with Scott Allie and Sebastián Fiumara, 2013)
  - The New Race of Man (with John Arcudi and Max Fiumara, 2013)
  - The Shape of Things to Come (with Scott Allie and Sebastián Fiumara, 2013)
  - The Land of the Dead (with Scott Allie and Michael Avon Oeming, 2013)
  - To the Last Man (with Scott Allie and Max Fiumara, 2014)
  - The Garden (I) (with Scott Allie and Max Fiumara, 2014)
  - The Healer (with Scott Allie and Sebastián Fiumara, 2014)
  - Visions, Dreams, and Fishin’ (with Scott Allie and Max Fiumara, 2014)
  - Lost Lives (with Scott Allie and Juan Ferreyra, 2014)
  - Sacred Places (with Scott Allie and Sebastián Fiumara, 2014)
  - A Darkness so Great (with Scott Allie, and Max and Sebastián Fiumara, 2014)
  - Subconscious (with John Arcdui and Mark Nelson, 2015)
  - The Ogopogo (with Scott Allie and Kevin Nowlan, 2015)
  - The Shadow Over Suwanee (with Scott Allie, Sebastián and Max Fiumara, and Tyler Crook 2015)
  - Icthyo Sapien (with Scott Allie and Alise Gluškova, 2015)
  - The Garden (II) (with Scott Allie and Max Fiumara, 2015)
  - Witchcraft & Demonology (with Scott Allie and Santiago Caruso, 2016)
  - The Black School (with Scott Allie and Sebastián Fiumara, 2016)
  - Regressions (with Scott Allie and Max Fiumara, 2016)
  - Dark and Terrible Deep (with Scott Allie and Sebastián Fiumara, 2016)
  - The Garden (III) (with Scott Allie and Max Fiumara, 2016)
  - The Desolate Shore (with Scott Allie and Sebastián Fiumara, 2016)
- Sir Edward Grey, Witchfinder:
  - Murderous Intent (with Ben Stenbeck in Dark Horse Presents #16, November 2008)
  - In the Service of Angels (with Ben Stenbeck, 2009)
  - Lost and Gone Forever (with John Arcudi and John Severin, 2011)
  - Beware the Ape (with Ben Stenbeck, 2014)
  - City of the Dead (with Chris Roberson and Ben Stenbeck, 2016)
  - The Gates of Heaven (with Chris Roberson and D'Israeli, 2018)
  - The Serpent in the Garden: Ed Grey and the Last Battle for England (with Ben Stenbeck, Dark Horse, 2024)
- How Koshchei Became Deathless (with Guy Davis, 2009)
- Baba Yaga's Feast (with Guy Davis, 2009)
- Sledgehammer 44:
  - Sledgehammer 44 (with John Arcudi and Jason Latour, 2013)
  - Lightning War (with John Arcudi and Laurence Campbell, 2013)
- Frankenstein Underground (with Ben Stenbeck, 2015)
- Broken Vessels (with Scott Allie and Tim Sale, 2016)
- Rise of the Black Flame (with Chris Roberson and Christopher Mitten, 2016)
- The Great Blizzard (with Chris Roberson and Christopher Mitten, 2017)
- God Rest Ye Merry (with Chris Roberson and Paul Grist, 2017)
- The Last Witch of Fairfield (with Scott Allie and Sebastián Fiumara, 2017)
- The Visitor: How & Why He Stayed (with Chris Roberson and Paul Grist, 2017)
- Rasputin: The Voice of the Dragon (with Chris Roberson and Christopher Mitten, 2017)
- Koshchei the Deathless (with Ben Stenbeck, 2018)
- Frankenstein: New World (with Christopher Golden, Tom Sniegoski, and Peter Bergting, Dark Horse, 2022)
- Miss Truesdale and the Fall of Hyperborea (with Jesse Lonergan and Clem Robins, 2024)
- Frankenstein: New World--The Sea of Forever (with Christopher Golden, Tom Sniegoski, and Peter Bergting, Dark Horse, 2025)

=== Novels ===
- Baltimore, or, The Steadfast Tin Soldier and the Vampire, with Christopher Golden, 2007, (ISBN 0553804715)
- Nesting, with Christopher Golden, 2010
- Joe Golem and the Drowning City, with Christopher Golden, 2012, (ISBN 0312644736)
- Father Gaetano's Puppet Catechism, with Christopher Golden, 2012, (ISBN 0312644744)
- Grim Death and Bill the Electrocuted Criminal, with Thomas E. Sniegoski, 2017, (ISBN 1250077680)

=== Covers ===
- Action Comics No. 614 (DC)
- Action Comics Annual No. 6 (DC)
- Adventures of Superman Annual No. 6 (DC)
- Aliens versus Predator No. 0 (Dark Horse)
- Aliens versus Predator: Fire and Stone No. 1 (Dark Horse)
- Alpha Flight No. 29–34, 36, 39 (Marvel)
- The American: Lost In America No. 3 (Dark Horse)
- Amazing Heroes No. 76 (Fantagraphics)
- Angel No. 12 (Dark Horse)
- Aquaman vol. 3 No. 6 (DC)
- Batgirl Special No. 1 (DC)
- Batman No. 426-429(DC)
- Batman Annual No. 18 (DC)
- Batman: Legends of the Dark Knight No. 62, Annual 1(DC)
- Batman/Judge Dredd: Vendetta In Gotham No. 1 (DC)
- Bitter Root No. 1 (Image)
- Blue Beetle No. 19 (DC)
- Captain America Annual No. 10 (Marvel)
- Cheval Noir No. 12 (Dark Horse)
- Conan No. 29–31 (Dark Horse)
- Conan the Barbarian No. 236–237 (Marvel)
- The Creep No. 1 (Dark Horse)
- Critical Mass No. 1 (Epic)
- Daredevil Annual 1991 (Marvel)
- Dark Horse Presents No. 88–91, 107, 142, 151 (Dark Horse)
- Dark Horse Comics No. 2 (Dark Horse)
- Dark Horse 20 Years (Dark Horse)
- Deadman No. 3–5 (DC)
- Death Jr. (Image)
- Death of Lady Vampire No. 1 (Black Out)
- Detective Comics No. 583 (February 1988)(DC)
- Disney's Atlantis: The Lost Empire (Dark Horse)
- Disney Pixar The Incredibles No. 1 (Boom)
- Doctor Strange vol. 2 No. 75 (Marvel)
- Doctor Tomorrow No. 1 (Valiant)
- Doom Force No. 1 (inks) (DC)
- Drawing On Your Nightmares Halloween Special RRP Variant Edition (Dark Horse)
- Dylan Dog No. 1-6 and special number "Zed" (Dark Horse)
- Fallen Angels No. 6 (Marvel)
- Fantastic Four Ashcan (Marvel)
- Frankenstein Dracula War No. 1–3 (Topps)
- Freaks' Amour No. 3 (Dark Horse)
- Gutt Ghost No. 1 (Scout)
- The Incredible Hulk No. 302, 304–309 (covers), 311–313 (covers and interiors) (Marvel)
- Justice League Quarterly No. 14 (DC)
- Kabuki: The Alcemy No. 6 (Icon)
- Kickers, Inc. No. 9, 12 (Marvel)
- Lobo: Unamerican Gladiators No. 1–4 (DC)
- The Machine No. 2 (Dark Horse)
- The Man with the Screaming Brain No. 4 (Dark Horse)
- The Marquis: Danse Macabre No. 2 (Oni)
- Marvel Comics Presents No. 20 (Marvel)
- Marvel Fanfare No. 43 (Marvel)
- Marvel Team-Up No. 141 (inks) (Marvel)
- Michael Chabon Presents The Amazing Adventures of the Escapist No. 3 (Dark Horse)
- Michael Moorcock's Corum: The Bull and the Spear No. 1 (First)
- The Mighty Thor vol. 2 No. 26 (Marvel)
- The New Defenders No. 139, 141, 142(inks) (Marvel)
- New Mutants No. 54, Annual No. 7 (Marvel)
- New Warriors Annual No. 1 (inks) (Marvel)
- Nexus No. 28, (First)
- Out of the Vortex No. 2 (Dark Horse)
- Paper Museum No. 1 (Jungle Boy)
- Power Pack No. 20 (Marvel)
- Punisher vol. 2 No. 6 (Marvel)
- Quasar No. 15 (Marvel)
- Ragmop No. 4 (Planet Lucy)
- Ragnarok No. 8 (IDW)
- Randy Bowen's Decapitator No. 4 (Dark Horse)
- Rook No. 1-2 (Harris)
- Rumble Vol. 2 No. 1 (Dark Horse)
- The Sandman: The Dream Hunters No. 2 (DC)
- Sea of Stars No. 1 (Image)
- Secret Origins No. 41 (DC)
- The Shadow Strikes! No. 31 (DC)
- Shaolin Cowboy No. 2 (Burlyman)
- Sherlock Frankenstein and the Legion of Evil No. 1 (Dark Horse)
- Ship of Fools No. 1 (Caliber)
- Showcase '94 No. 3 (DC)
- Silver Surfer Vol. 3 No. 14 (Marvel)
- Snake Moon A Novel (Night Shade Books)
- Solar Man Of The Atom No. 24 (Valiant)
- Solomon Kane: Castle of the Devil
- Spawn No. 100 (Image)
- Spectre No. 7–9 (DC)
- Starman No. 42–45 (DC)
- Star Wars: Hyperspace Stories Annual—Jaxxon 2023
- Strange Tales vol. 2 No. 19 (Marvel)
- Strikeforce: Morituri No. 21 (Marvel)
- Superman Annual No. 6 (DC)
- Superman: The Man of Steel Annual No. 3 (DC)
- Tales of the Unexpected No. 1 (DC)
- Trickster (Global & Trickster)
- Uncanny X-Men Annual No. 15 (Marvel)
- Whiteout No. 2 (Oni)
- Will to Power No. 10-12 (Dark Horse)
- Wolverine No. 28 (inks) (Marvel)
- X-Factor No. 55, 70, Annual 6 (Marvel)
- X-Men Classic No. 57–70 (Marvel)
- Xena: Warrior Princess No. 1 (Dark Horse)
- Zorro No. 6 (Topps)

=== Media covers ===
- Cronos Criterion Collection Cover
