= Johann Kraus =

Hellboy character

Publication information
- Publisher: Dark Horse Comics
- First appearance: Dark Horse Extra #42 (December 2001)
- Created by: Mike Mignola

In-story information
- Team affiliations: B.P.R.D.
- Partnerships: Abe Sapien; Liz Sherman; Kate Corrigan
- Abilities: Physical medium Ectoplasmic abilities Teleplasty (film version)

Johann Kraus is a fictional character in the comic book series Hellboy, created by Mike Mignola. He is featured in the comic book B.P.R.D., published by Dark Horse Comics. Kraus is a disembodied ectoplasmic spirit with psychic abilities, who inhabits a containment suit, without which his form would eventually dissipate and be lost forever.

A live action version of Kraus, named Johann Krauss, appeared in the 2008 sequel film Hellboy II: The Golden Army, with his voice provided by Seth MacFarlane.

== Fictional character biography ==
Born in Stuttgart, West Germany, in 1946, Johann Kraus became aware of his psychic abilities when he was ten years old. Frustrated with his inability to help the spirits that appeared to him, he sought out spiritualists in attempts to better understand his powers. Disappointed with occultism, Kraus turned to the church, which allowed him to focus on the spirits themselves rather than the occultist's focus on study and academia. In 1971, he opened an office in Munich, where he became a well-respected medium before relocating to Heidelberg.

In early 2002, Kraus was the only survivor of a seance affected by a mystical disaster. His ectoplasmic form survived when his body was incinerated, and knowing he would dissipate without a physical body, he sought out the best paranormal minds on the planet for help: the B.P.R.D. At first, he was sustained inside a transparent tank apparatus developed by the B.P.R.D. for other purposes; eventually the technology was sized down into his distinctive containment suit. Kate Corrigan has said of him that, "He's not dead. He just doesn't have a body anymore."

After the loss of Hellboy, Kraus was hired to replenish the Bureau's pool of "enhanced talents". Kraus soon proved an invaluable member of the team. His psychic abilities are better than ever due to his condition (similar to a musician who has lost his eyesight). Where once he could speak with the dead, now he can give them temporary physical form. Johann is also an accomplished scholar in occult lore and, since he no longer requires sleep, works constantly. It was largely he who researched and organized the mountains of files culled from the sub-basement of the Bureau's new base in the Colorado mountains, resulting in the revelation that Ben Daimio's grandmother had been a Nazi occult war criminal. There was tension between the two for some time after this. Their sometimes difficult relationship was perhaps not helped by the death of Roger the homunculus, who Johann had been closer to than perhaps anyone else, owing at least partly to Daimio's actions.

When the Bureau came into possession of two giant vat-grown bodies awaiting a soul in the aftermath of the Garden of Souls storyline, Johann took possession of one of these. Overcome by giddy euphoria at finally having regained life, at being able to taste and touch once more, Johann let himself be seduced by the pleasures of the flesh. He all but abandoned his work and commitments to the Bureau to indulge his vices. This proved to be the worst possible time for such a lapse, as the halls of the Bureau came under attack by two separate monsters, one of them the were-jaguar form of Captain Ben Daimio. Johann returned in the nick of time, saving the lives of Kate and Abe, but was himself savagely killed.

Condemned to his ectoplasmic half-life once more, Johann began pursuing a private obsession with Ben Daimio, trying to track down his living relatives and hiding the ceremonial dagger that is supposedly the only weapon that can destroy him in his were-jaguar form. In 2009, Johann returned to his beloved Munich for the first time since his 2002 accident during The Warning, only to see it destroyed and its inhabitants killed by a subterranean robot army, a blow from which he has found it hard to recover.

Johann has developed a brotherly relationship with zombie Iosif Nichayko, the director of Russia's "Special Sciences Service" who also lives confined to a containment suit. After a successful mission, Iosif gifted Johann an altered form of his own more advanced containment suit to Johann's delight. By Johann's own admission, his new suit has changed his life as it feels like a body – so much so that he once even fell asleep and dreamed for the first time since his "accident".

Johann dies when he sacrifices himself to destroy the Ogdru Jahad that landed on Earth.

== Powers and abilities ==
Kraus possesses the ability to both communicate with spirits and grant them temporary physical forms to allow them to talk with non-mediums.

Kraus has limited body possession powers, which enable him to take possession of any form lacking a soul. He has temporarily inhabited the corpses of humans, a dog, and a moose, using them as last-minute containers for his vulnerable form.

It was once believed that Johann was vulnerable to psychic attack and his ectoplasm could be taken over by stronger spirits, but it was discovered that he is immune to possession and can take dominance over malevolent spirits - even an Ogdru Hem.

The only protection Johann has from dissipation is his B.P.R.D.-built containment suit; once the suit is breached, he must find a new container for his essence or he will cease to exist.

== In other media ==
Johann Kraus appeared in the 2008 film Hellboy II: The Golden Army. In the film his name is spelled "Johann Krauss". His character's movements were supplied by British actors John Alexander and James Dodd, and his voice was performed by Seth MacFarlane. Thomas Kretschmann was previously cast for the voice, but was replaced.

Krauss is head of the B.P.R.D.'s Ectoplasmic Research division in Washington, D.C., and is sent to the Bureau's headquarters to take command of the team, after Hellboy embarrasses the Bureau and the government by revealing himself to the public.

The cause of his condition is not explained, but he hints that it was connected with the loss of the woman he loved - a fiancée or a wife, whose ring he still carries around with him. He said that his containment suit was designed by the B.P.R.D.'s former head, Trevor Bruttenholm. According to the film commentary, Guillermo del Toro stated that, in the planned story for the third Hellboy film, Krauss would also have some history with the character of Nazi scientist Karl Ruprecht Kroenen.

Krauss immediately strikes Abe Sapien and Tom Manning as knowledgeable and efficient, while Hellboy dislikes him, possibly because he feels overshadowed, and as Hellboy himself says, Johann's name "sounds German... I don't like Germans", due to his hatred of Nazis.

Krauss is punctilious, strait-laced, and scrupulously "by-the-book". In the commentary, Guillermo del Toro said that he used the character to express his idea of the perfect bureaucrat: lacking a face, body, or any individual identity. This is a departure from the comics version, where Krauss is portrayed as quite compassionate and feeling, often playing an avuncular role towards the rest of the team.

Both the comic and film version of Johann can leave their containment suit at will, though it is uncertain how long he can do so without dissipating; once freed from his suit, his ectoplasmic form can physically manipulate objects (as demonstrated when he gives Hellboy a sound thrashing in the B.P.R.D. locker room with a set of locker doors), or can be used for teleplasty (from the Greek τηλε "far" + πλαστειν "to mold or form"; the word ectoplasm derives from the same root), enabling him to temporarily reanimate dead creatures and possess mechanical objects or living things. He uses this talent to great effect near the film's climax, when he takes over one of the Golden Army's soldiers and uses it to fight the others.

Outside his containment suit, he appears as a roughly humanoid shape in whispy, ghostly form.

When Liz Sherman and Abe decide to disobey orders and take the dying Hellboy to Prince Nuada, Krauss initially forbids them to, but reconsiders, remembering his own lost love. Deciding to support the renegades, he helps Liz and Abe steal the Bureau's plane to find the Prince, participates in the battle against the Golden Army, and quits the B.P.R.D. along with his new comrades.

On a commentary on the Hellboy II DVD, director Guillermo del Toro states that Johann's helmet design was an unused idea for Master Chief in the unreleased Halo movie.
