= Liz Sherman =

Fictional character from the Hellboy comic books

Elizabeth Sherman

Publication information
- Publisher: Dark Horse Comics
- First appearance: Hellboy: Seed of Destruction (1994)
- Created by: Mike Mignola

In-story information
- Full name: Elizabeth Anne Sherman
- Species: Human
- Team affiliations: B.P.R.D.
- Partnerships: Hellboy; Abe Sapien
- Notable aliases: Liz, Sparky, Fire Starter
- Abilities: Blue pyrokinesis (Live action); Flame projection

Elizabeth Anne Sherman is a fictional character appearing in the Hellboy comic book series created by Mike Mignola. A firestarter, she becomes a ward of the B.P.R.D. at age 11 after burning her family to death in a traumatic accident. Sherman later hones her abilities and becomes a longtime field agent for the Bureau alongside Hellboy and Abe Sapien.

In the live-action films by Guillermo del Toro, Sherman is played by Selma Blair and is portrayed as a love interest for Hellboy. Blair reprised the role for the Hellboy Animated films.

== Fictional character history ==
Born in Kansas City, Kansas, on April 15, 1962, Liz has a normal childhood until her pyrokinetic abilities begin to manifest at age ten. Raised Catholic, Liz feels that the fires are a result of her sins, and for a short time manages to keep them under control by a combination of prayer and force of will. However, in July 1973, at age eleven, she loses control. The resulting eruption destroys a city block and takes the lives of her parents, brother, and pet dog. Liz's last uncontrolled manifestation takes place on July 4, 1984.

After being juggled between extended family members following the death of her parents, Liz is taken in by the Bureau for Paranormal Research and Defense in May 1974, where she learns to control her power to some degree. In 1980, she becomes a full agent. She is often teamed with Hellboy and Abe Sapien. Her childhood trauma leaves her bitter and she comes and goes from the Bureau. During the events of the story arc Wake the Devil, while searching for Giurescu's body, Liz leads a group composed of herself, Bud Waller, and Leach to the Ruins of Czege Castle. By accident, Liz's group comes across a chamber containing the homunculus that is later named "Roger". Upon inspecting Roger, Liz inadvertently transfers her pyrokinesis into the homunculus. He comes to life and kills Bud before running off. Liz enters a coma as she is taken to Wauer Institute in Tirgoviste. The loss of her powers is causing her body to fail. She is saved when Hellboy finds Roger, who, plagued by guilt concerning the accident, returns her powers.

To learn how to better control her pyrokinesis, Liz lives with a society of monks in the Agartha Temple in the Ural Mountains before resuming active duty in the Bureau after Hellboy quits. As a result of her time amongst the monks, Liz now has complete control over fire: she can produce small flames to light her way, erupt in a furious explosion of fire to destroy anything around her, and manipulate fire into shapes and designs. Her powers are magnified by an ancient object revealed to her in a dream by the mysterious Memnan Saa. This dramatic increase in her powers allows her to burn the towering Katha-Hem entity to dust.

Even after defeating Katha-Hem, Liz continues to be plagued by horrible visions and mysterious dreams featuring Memnan Saa; as a result, Liz loses sleep and becomes more irritable and less reliable. The dreams come to a height during the Killing Ground story arc, where Saa takes advantage of Ben Daimio's transformation to fully possess Liz and drive her into a coma until the ghost of Lobster Johnson appears and freed her.

Liz is kidnapped by Memnan Saa and the rest of her team tracks her down. Saa is killed but claims that using Liz's pyrokinetic power, he'd be able to prevent the upcoming apocalypse. Following this, in a mission to the underworld, Saa's ghost intercepts Liz and shows her a vision of the future: the apocalypse successful. Under the guidance of a mysterious aged man, she unleashes her full pyrokinetic powers, incinerating the Hollow Earth - and wipes out a combined frog/Hyperborean army gathered by the Black Flame. This ends the threat of these menaces for good but causes devastation across Earth. At first, it seemed as if her powers were completely gone, and she leaves the Bureau as Ogdru Hem awakens across the world and ushers in the apocalypse.

Eventually, her powers returned, more powerful than ever. She soon returned to active duty with the B.P.R.D. and was sent along with a number of other specialized agents into the "dead zone" surrounding the mutant-infested ruins of New York City. The mission ended when Liz managed to engage the Black Flame, now resurrected as a veritable demigod and revealed to be the ruler of the ruins. After a period of furious fighting, Liz was ultimately defeated but managed to escape and her actions enabled the Bureau's agents to also escape the various mutants and armed mercenaries in service to the Black Flame and his human followers.

The apocalyptic events plaguing the world came to a climax when the Black Flame, embittered and empowered by personal loss, managed to reach into the void and release one of the Ogdru Jahad, summoning it to Earth and binding it into his service. Liz and Johann Kraus, recently empowered by a connection to an ancient source of cosmic power, were sent to deal with the Ogdru Jahad, with no tangible results. In response, the two were sent back to New York City with the help of a Naval deployment to kill the Black Flame in the hopes of weakening the creature, only to find that the Black Flame's influence was the only thing keeping the titanic beast's power in check. Ultimately, it was only an act of self-sacrifice from Johann that led to its defeat.

Following the destruction of the Ogdru Jahad, Liz played an active role in the cleanup of the remaining threats wreaking havoc on the world and entered a romantic relationship with agent Ted Howards of the Bureau. The apocalypse resumed however after the destruction of a powerful demon when Rasputin was brought back to the physical world, revealed to have become host to the power of the destroyed Ogdru Jahad's power. He was confronted by Liz and the recently resurrected Hellboy in the streets of New York and only defeated at the cost of Hellboy's own life. Liz wandered the ruined Earth for some time until called upon by the spirits of Hellboy and Hecate to cleanse the damaged Earth of the Ogdru Jahad's corruption. She released her full power, reducing the surface of the Earth to a smoking cinder so that it might begin anew. She was shown to have survived, however, encasing herself in a Hyperborean crystal prison and eventually being found by the descendants of Abraham Sapien that had come to inhabit the restored Earth in humankind's absence.

== Relationship with Hellboy ==
In the Hellboy film series Liz has a romantic relationship with Hellboy. She was taken in as a child so she grows up knowing Hellboy, they eventually become more and both films touch on them working out feeling for each other as well as how their relationship would work with who they both are. The second film has Liz dealing with being pregnant with Hellboy's twin children and how that will change their relationship going forward as their lives change due to other plot points. However, in the comic books, Liz and Hellboy are only friends.

== In other media ==
- Liz Sherman was played by Selma Blair in the film adaptation of the Hellboy comics. Blair reprised her role in the film's sequel and both straight-to-DVD animated Hellboy films. In the second live-action film, she is revealed to be pregnant with Hellboy's child after being touched by Abe Sapien by mistake while he shields her from harm. At the end of the film, it is revealed she is actually pregnant with twins, much to Hellboy's shock.
- Liz was one of the first four Hellboy Comic action figures produced in 2005 by Mezco Toyz. She appeared with Hellboy, Lobster Johnson, and Herman von Klempt and Kriegaffe #10.
- Liz is mentioned by Hellboy in the fighting game, Injustice 2, with Hellboy claiming Starfire and Swamp Thing would like to meet her for being a "fire starter", referencing her pyrokinetic abilities.
