= Dave Stewart (artist) =

American comic book colorist

- Area: Colourist
- Awards: Eisner Award: 2003, 2005, 2007, 2008, 2009, 2010, 2011, 2013, 2015, 2020

Dave Stewart is a colorist working in the comics industry.

== Work and recognition ==
Stewart is known for his work at Dark Horse Comics, DC Comics, and Marvel Comics, as well as coloring Tim Sale's art in Heroes.

He has been recognized for his work with the Eisner Award for Coloring in 2003, 2005, 2007–2011, 2013, 2015, and 2020.

== Bibliography ==
Comics work (colours unless specified) includes:

=== Dark Horse Comics ===
- Mike Mignola's Hellboy, B.P.R.D., Abe Sapien, Lobster Johnson, Witchfinder, Sledgehammer 44, Baltimore, and The Amazing Screw-On Head
- Gerard Way's The Umbrella Academy
- Conan
- Michael Chabon's The Amazing Adventures of The Escapist
- Joss Whedon's Fray
- Numerous Star Wars comics
- Eric Powell's The Goon
- Let Me In: Crossroads
- Brian Wood's The Massive (#1–9,#14–present)
- Geof Darrow's Shaolin Cowboy

=== DC Comics ===
- Darwyn Cooke's DC: The New Frontier
- Jeph Loeb and Tim Sale's Catwoman: When in Rome
- Brian Azzarello and Lee Bermejo's Lex Luthor: Man of Steel
- Detective Comics written by Greg Rucka #854-860
- Superman written by Kurt Busiek and pencilled by Carlos Pacheco
- Fábio Moon and Gabriel Bá's Daytripper
- Sean Murphy's Batman: Beyond the White Knight

=== Image Comics ===
- The Walking Dead covers #115–present

=== Marvel Comics ===
- Captain America #1–9, 17–20 (2002–2004)
- Daredevil Vol. 2 #66–81 (2004–2006)
- Ultimate Fantastic Four #1–18 (2004–2005)
- Ultimate X-Men – various issues, 2001–2004
- Union Jack (1998–99)
- Iron Man: Enter the Mandarin (2007–2008)

=== Television ===
- Isaac Mendez' precognitive art on NBC's Heroes (which itself is drawn by Tim Sale)

=== Wildstorm ===
- Silent Dragon (2005)
