= Hellboy (franchise) =

Media franchise based on Dark Horse Comics series

- Official franchise logo
- Original work: Hellboy (2004)
- Owner: Dark Horse Comics
- Years: 2004–present
- Based on: Hellboy by Mike Mignola

The Hellboy media franchise consists of four live-action theatrical films, a live-action television pilot, two animated television feature films and short films, and various games and novels, based on the Dark Horse Comics character of the same name, created by Mike Mignola. The franchise has grossed a total of $325.9 million, on a combined budget of $212.5–$221 million.

== Comics ==
The character of Hellboy was originally created by Mike Mignola as a comic book character in 1993, and has featured in numerous comic books, miniseries, one-shots, backup features, crossovers, and guest appearances. The first film adaptation was made in 2004.

== Films ==
Title	U.S. release date	Director	Screenwriter	Story by	Producers
Hellboy	April 2, 2004	Guillermo del Toro		Guillermo del Toro and Peter Briggs	Lawrence Gordon, Mike Richardson, and Lloyd Levin
Hellboy II: The Golden Army	July 11, 2008	Guillermo del Toro		Guillermo del Toro and Mike Mignola	Lawrence Gordon, Mike Richardson, and Lloyd Levin
Hellboy	April 12, 2019	Neil Marshall	Andrew Cosby	—N/a	Lawrence Gordon, Lloyd Levin, Mike Richardson, Philip Westgren, Carl Hampe, Matt O'Toole, Les Weldon, and Yariv Lerner
Hellboy: The Crooked Man	October 8, 2024	Brian Taylor	Mike Mignola, Christopher Golden, and Brian Taylor	—N/a	Mike Richardson, Jeff Greenstein, Yariv Lerner, Jonathan Yunger, Les Weldon, Robert Van Norden, and Sam Shulte

=== Original series ===
==== Hellboy (2004) ====
Ron Perlman, David Harbour, and Jack Kesy as Hellboy

The film was directed and co-written by Guillermo del Toro and stars Ron Perlman as Hellboy (the favorite of both del Toro and Mignola for the role), Selma Blair as Liz Sherman, Rupert Evans as FBI Special Agent John Myers (a character created for the film), John Hurt as Professor Trevor Bruttenholm, Doug Jones as Abe Sapien (voiced by an uncredited David Hyde Pierce), Karel Roden as Grigori Rasputin, and Jeffrey Tambor as FBI Senior Special Agent Tom Manning. The film depicts Hellboy as living at the B.P.R.D. with a dozen cats and limited access to the outside world, and considered an urban legend by the general populace.

==== Hellboy II: The Golden Army (2008) ====
A sequel, Hellboy II: The Golden Army, was shot in Budapest by Guillermo del Toro and released in 2008, with Perlman and Blair returning. Jones also returned as Abe Sapien (undubbed this time), and also in two other roles, The Angel of Death and The Chamberlain. Revolution Studios had planned on making the film (which Columbia Pictures was to distribute), but the studio went out of business before filming. Universal Studios then picked it up. The plot is a shift to more folklore rather than action, with heavy European overtones. The character of Johann Kraus was added to the team, voiced by Seth MacFarlane. The character Roger the Homunculus was not, but he was written into the plot as a very prominent character in early drafts of the script. The character of Agent Myers from the first film does not return, his absence being explained by Liz remarking that Hellboy had him transferred to Antarctica out of jealousy. Hellboy also reveals himself to the outside world in this film, and Liz is revealed to be pregnant with his twin children. On November 11, 2008, the film was released on DVD.

=== First reboot ===
==== Hellboy (2019) ====
In May 2017, Mignola announced Millennium Media's plans for an R-rated reboot, at the time titled Hellboy: Rise of the Blood Queen, with David Harbour as the titular character and Neil Marshall directing from a script by Andrew Cosby, Christopher Golden and Mignola. The film draws inspiration from Darkness Calls, The Wild Hunt, The Storm and the Fury, and Hellboy in Mexico. The film, later retitled as Hellboy, was released on April 12, 2019, to negative reviews. It grossed $55.1 million against a $50 million production budget, with several media outlets declaring it a box office bomb. In 2022, Marshall decried the film, calling it the "worst professional experience" of his life due to creative control being taken from him by the producers and that the script was not salvageable, concluding that "there's nothing of me in that movie."

=== Second reboot ===
==== Hellboy: The Crooked Man (2024) ====
In February 2023, Millennium Media announced plans for another reboot titled Hellboy: The Crooked Man, the first in a potential series of films. Brian Taylor directed from a script by Mignola and Golden, based on the 2008 comic of the same name, with Jack Kesy as Hellboy. The film was released direct-to-VOD in the United States on October 8, 2024.

=== Cancelled projects ===
==== Hellboy III ====
During prerelease promotion for The Golden Army, Guillermo del Toro indicated interest in a third movie: "I think we would all come back to do a third Hellboy [...] I certainly know where we're going with the movie on the third one." Over the years, del Toro would opine that the project was unlikely to happen, citing many difficulties including securing funding for the increased scope he envisioned. In 2017, the rights holders opted for a reboot and relaunch of Hellboy on film rather than continuing with del Toro's involvement. Though Perlman continued to express a desire to finish the trilogy with del Toro well into the 2020s, by 2024 he had "let go of the fight" to make the film.

==== Hellboy: Silverlance ====
In 2010, Hellboy screenwriter Peter Briggs was asked by Universal to script a spin-off centring on Prince Nuada, and provisionally agreed that Briggs could direct the film in New Zealand. Briggs began work on an outline with co-writer Aaron Mason. Titled Hellboy: Silverlance, the script was a B.P.R.D. story featuring Abe Sapien as the main character with Hellboy in a supporting role. Moving into the new B.P.R.D. headquarters in Colorado, Abe is troubled by his psychic connection with Princess Nuala, and begins researching the elves' history. The film would have shown Nuada's adventures throughout history, including his rivalry with a fairy courtier who orchestrates Nuada's exile in hopes of marrying Nuala and seizing control of the fairy kingdom; Nuada first meeting Mister Wink by saving him from a troupe of soldiers during the Spanish Inquisition; and Nuada in Nazi Germany, engineering a pact to keep various supernatural entities safe during World War II (with Nuada and Kroenen fighting in a "friendly" match for Project Ragnarok men). Doug Jones would have played both Abe and the Angel of Death, who strikes a bargain with Nuada. Rupert Evans's Agent Myers would also have returned. The story climaxed at the new B.P.R.D. headquarters, with the return of Rasputin's summoning gauntlet. Universal wanted to proceed with the project, but it emerged that del Toro's Hellboy 3 was still a possibility, so Silverlance was shelved.

In 2015, Briggs received another call from Universal, saying that Hellboy 3 had been cancelled and asking him and Mason to return for a reworked Silverlance, with producer Lawrence Gordon involved. The caveat was that Hellboy could not appear, but the writers managed to get the character a cameo appearance at the climax. If successful, the film would have launched a From the Files of the B.P.R.D. spin-off series.

In May 2017, Briggs affirmed that, with the announcement of the Hellboy reboot, the Silverlance project was dead.

== Television ==
Title	U.S. release date	Director	Screenwriter	Story by	Producers
The B.P.R.D. Declassified	March 22, 2004	Ben Rock			Ben Rock and Matt Compton
Hellboy: Sword of Storms	October 28, 2006	Phil Weinstein	Matt Wayne and Tad Stones	Mike Mignola and Tad Stones	Scott D. Greenberg, Scott Hemming, and Sidney Clifton
Hellboy: Blood and Iron	March 10, 2007	Victor Cook	Kevin Hopps	Mike Mignola and Tad Stones	Scott D. Greenberg, Scott Hemming, and Sidney Clifton

=== Live-action pilot ===
The B.P.R.D. Declassified, a 22-minute television pilot centering on the B.P.R.D, was written and directed by Ben Rock and aired on FX on March 22, 2004.

=== Animated films ===
On November 9, 2005, IDT Entertainment issued a press release announcing that the company had licensed the rights to develop "animated content for television and home entertainment" based on the Hellboy comic. Ron Perlman (Hellboy), Selma Blair (Liz Sherman), Doug Jones (Abe Sapien) and John Hurt (Professor Trevor "Broom" Bruttenholm) have all voiced their respective characters. Actress Peri Gilpin joined the cast as Professor Kate Corrigan.

The first two 75-minute animated films, Sword of Storms and Blood and Iron, aired on Cartoon Network before being released on DVD. The first one aired on October 28, 2006, and the second aired on March 10, 2007. A "Hellboy 2 Pack" limited edition DVD set was released on July 1, 2008, that contained both films.

Both stories have much more in common with the comic book Hellboy rather than the film — Abe Sapien is not psychic, for example, and the artwork and color palette is derived more from Mignola's original artwork. The DVD of Sword of Storms was released on February 6, 2007; it contains documentary material, commentary, and a Hellboy comic, "Phantom Limbs". Blood and Iron similarly contains a comic called "The Yearning".

==== Animated short films ====
Hellboy: Iron Shoes (2007) was included as a bonus feature on the Hellboy: Blood and Iron DVD, with the cast reprising their roles. The Dark Below (2010) was released on various streaming services, with Hellboy voiced by Zebulon Pike.

==== Cancelled third film ====
A third animated Hellboy film, The Phantom Claw, has been put on hold. Tad Stones, director and writer of the direct-to-video films, says the film would have starred Lobster Johnson and had some familiar characters, but Abe and Liz would not be in the film (at least not as main characters).

== Main cast and characters ==
List indicators

This section includes characters who will appear or have appeared in more than two films in the series.

- An empty grey cell indicates the character was not in the film, or that the character's official presence has not yet been confirmed.
- ^{C} indicates a cameo role.
- ^{U} indicates an uncredited appearance.
- ^{V} indicates a voice-only role.
- ^{Y} indicates a younger version of the character.

Character	Films					
Character	Hellboy	Hellboy: Sword of Storms	Hellboy: Blood and Iron	Hellboy II: The Golden Army	Hellboy	Hellboy: The Crooked Man
Character	2004	2006	2007	2008	2019	2024
Introduced in Hellboy (2004)
Hellboy Anung Un Rama	Ron Perlman	Ron Perlman	Ron Perlman	Ron Perlman	David Harbour	Jack Kesy
Elizabeth "Liz" Sherman	Selma Blair	Selma Blair	Selma Blair	Selma Blair		
John Myers	Rupert Evans					
Trevor "Prof. Trevor Broom" Bruttenholm	John Hurt		John Hurt James Arnold Taylor^{Y}	John Hurt	Ian McShane	
Abraham "Abe" Sapien Langdon Everett Caul	Doug Jones David Hyde Pierce^{V}	Doug Jones	Doug Jones	Doug Jones	Uncredited actor^{C}	
Tom Manning	Jeffrey Tambor		Jim Cummings	Jeffrey Tambor		
Grigori Rasputin	Karel Roden				Markos Rounthwaite ^{C}	
Prof.Karl Ruprect Kroenen	Ladislav Beran				Ilko Iliev ^{C}	
Ilsa Haupstein	Bridget Hodson				Vanessa Eicholz ^{C}	
Klaus Werner von Krupt	William Hoyland				Joel Harlow ^{C}	
Introduced in Hellboy: Sword of Storms (2006)
Professor Kate Corrigan		Peri Gilpin	Peri Gilpin			
Russell Thorn		Mitchell Whitfield				
Kitsune		Gwendoline Yeo				
Introduced in Hellboy: Blood and Iron (2007)
Lobster Johnson the Lobster			Uncredited actor^{C}		Thomas Haden Church	
Sydney Leach			Rob Paulsen			
Father Lupescu			James Arnold Taylor			
Oliver Trumbolt			J. Grant Albrecht			
Hecate			Cree Summer			
Erzebet Ondrushko			Kath Soucie			
Introduced in Hellboy II: The Golden Army (2008)
Johann Kraus				John Alexander and James Dodd Seth MacFarlane^{V}		
Prince Nuada Silverlance				Luke Goss		
Princess Nuala				Anna Walton		
Introduced in Hellboy (2019)
Vivienne Nimue the Blood Queen					Milla Jovovich	
Alice Monaghan					Sasha Lane	
Ben Daimio					Daniel Dae Kim	
Gruagach					Douglas Tait^{U} Stephen Graham^{V}	
Lady Hatton					Sophie Okonedo	
Lord Adam Glaren					Alistair Petrie	
Merlin					Brian Gleeson	
Ganeida					Penelope Mitchell	
King Arthur					Mark Stanley	
Baba Yaga					Troy James Emma Tate^{V}	
Introduced in Hellboy: The Crooked Man (2024)
Jeremiah Witkins the Crooked Man						Martin Bassindale
Tom Ferrell						Jefferson White
Bobbie Jo Song						Adeline Rudolph
Reverend Nathaniel Armstrong Watts						Joseph Marcell
Effie Kolb						Leah McNamara
Cora Fisher						Hannah Margetson

== Additional crew and production details ==
Title	Crew/Detail					
Title	Composer	Cinematographer	Editor	Production companies	Distributing companies	Running time
Hellboy (2004)	Marco Beltrami	Guillermo Navarro	Peter Amundson	Revolution Studios, Lawrence Gordon/Lloyd Levin Productions, and Dark Horse Entertainment	Columbia Pictures and Revolution Studios	122 min
Hellboy: Sword of Storms (2006)	Christopher Drake	—N/a	John Hoyos and Jeffrey Perlmutter	Starz Media, Film Roman, Revolution Studios, and Madhouse	Anchor Bay Entertainment	77 min
Hellboy: Blood and Iron (2007)	Christopher Drake	—N/a	Matt Steinauer	Starz Media, Film Roman, Revolution Studios, and Madhouse	Anchor Bay Entertainment	75 min
Hellboy II: The Golden Army (2008)	Danny Elfman	Guillermo Navarro	Bernat Vilaplana	Universal Pictures, Relativity Media, Lawrence Gordon/Lloyd Levin Productions, and Dark Horse Entertainment	Universal Pictures	120 min
Hellboy (2019)	Benjamin Wallfisch	Lorenzo Senatore	Martin Bernfeld	Summit Entertainment, Millennium Media, Lawrence Gordon/Lloyd Levin Productions, Dark Horse Entertainment, Nu Boyana, and Campbell Grobman Films	Lionsgate	121 min
Hellboy: The Crooked Man (2024)	Sven Faulconer	Ivan Vatsov	Ryan Denmark	Millennium Media, Dark Horse Entertainment, Nu Boyana Film Studios, and Campbell Grobman Films	Ketchup Entertainment	99 min

== Reception ==
=== Box office and financial performance ===
Film	Box office gross			Box office ranking		Budget	Ref.
Film	North America	Other territories	Worldwide	All time North America	All time worldwide	Budget	Ref.
Hellboy (2004)	$59,623,958	$40,200,000	$99,823,958	1,562	1,871	$60–66 million	
Hellboy: Sword of Storms (2006)	—N/a	—N/a	—N/a	—N/a	—N/a	—N/a	
Hellboy: Blood and Iron (2007)	—N/a	—N/a	—N/a	—N/a	—N/a	—N/a	
Hellboy II: The Golden Army (2008)	$75,986,503	$92,332,740	$168,319,243	1,162	1,227	$82.5–85 million	
Hellboy (2019)	$21,903,748	$33,161,541	$55,065,289	3,669	3,001	$50 million	
Hellboy: The Crooked Man (2024)	—N/a	$2,661,545	$2,661,545	10,289	14,763	$20 million	
Total	$157,514,209	$168,355,826	$325,870,035	–	–	$212.5– $221 million	–

=== Critical and public response ===
Film	Critical		Public
Film	Rotten Tomatoes	Metacritic	CinemaScore
Hellboy (2004)	81% (204 reviews)	72 (37 reviews)	B−
Hellboy: Sword of Storms (2006)	—N/a (4 reviews)	—N/a	—N/a
Hellboy: Blood and Iron (2007)	—N/a (3 reviews)	—N/a	—N/a
Hellboy II: The Golden Army (2008)	86% (247 reviews)	78 (36 reviews)	B
Hellboy (2019)	17% (222 reviews)	31 (44 reviews)	C
Hellboy: The Crooked Man (2024)	40% (42 reviews)	44 (8 reviews)	—N/a

=== Accolades ===
Awards and nominations for Hellboy films
Award	Category	Film	Result	Ref(s)
Saturn Awards	Best Fantasy Film	Hellboy (2004)	Nominated	
Saturn Awards	Best Special Edition DVD Release	Hellboy (2004)	Nominated	
Saturn Awards	Best Costume Design	Hellboy (2004)	Nominated	
Saturn Awards	Best Make-up	Hellboy (2004)	Won	
Visual Effects Society Awards	Outstanding Performance by an Animated Character in a Live Action Motion Picture	Hellboy (2004)	Nominated	
Academy Awards	Best Makeup	Hellboy II: The Golden Army (2008)	Nominated	
Empire Awards	Best Sci-Fi/Superhero	Hellboy II: The Golden Army (2008)	Nominated	
Saturn Awards	Best Horror Film	Hellboy II: The Golden Army (2008)	Won	
Saturn Awards	Best Make-up	Hellboy II: The Golden Army (2008)	Nominated	
Saturn Awards	Best Special Effects	Hellboy II: The Golden Army (2008)	Nominated	
Screen Actors Guild Awards	Outstanding Performance by a Stunt Ensemble in a Motion Picture	Hellboy II: The Golden Army (2008)	Nominated	
Fangoria Chainsaw Awards	Best Supporting Actor	Hellboy II: The Golden Army (2008)	Won	
Fangoria Chainsaw Awards	Best Actor	Hellboy II: The Golden Army (2008)	Won	
Fangoria Chainsaw Awards	Best Make-Up/Creature FX	Hellboy II: The Golden Army (2008)	Won	
Fangoria Chainsaw Awards	Best Wide-Release Film	Hellboy II: The Golden Army (2008)	Won	
Fangoria Chainsaw Awards	Best Screenplay	Hellboy II: The Golden Army (2008)	Nominated	
Fangoria Chainsaw Awards	Best Supporting Actress	Hellboy II: The Golden Army (2008)	Nominated	
Visual Effects Society Awards	Outstanding Visual Effects in a Visual Effects-Driven Feature Motion Picture	Hellboy II: The Golden Army (2008)	Nominated	
Visual Effects Society Awards	Outstanding Animated Character in a Live Action Feature Motion Picture	Hellboy II: The Golden Army (2008)	Nominated	
20th Annual Golden Trailer Awards	Golden Fleece TV Spot (for a Feature Film)	Hellboy (2019)	Won	
20th Annual Golden Trailer Awards	Trashiest Trailer	Hellboy (2019)	Nominated	
40th Golden Raspberry Awards	Worst Director	Hellboy (2019)	Nominated	
40th Golden Raspberry Awards	Worst Actor	Hellboy (2019)	Nominated	
40th Golden Raspberry Awards	Worst Screenplay	Hellboy (2019)	Nominated	
40th Golden Raspberry Awards	Worst Prequel, Remake, Rip-off or Sequel	Hellboy (2019)	Nominated	
40th Golden Raspberry Awards	Worst Reckless Disregard for Human Life and Public Property	Hellboy (2019)	Nominated	

== Music ==
Title	U.S. release date	Performed by	Length	Label
Hellboy (2004): Original Motion Picture Soundtrack	April 6, 2004	Marco Beltrami	44:58	Varèse Sarabande
Hellboy II: The Golden Army: Original Motion Picture Soundtrack	July 15, 2008	Danny Elfman	59:33	Varèse Sarabande
Hellboy (2019): Original Motion Picture Soundtrack	April 5, 2019	Benjamin Wallfisch	48:38	Sony Masterworks
Hellboy: The Crooked Man: Original Motion Picture Soundtrack	November 8, 2024	Sven Faulconer	76:52	BMG

== Other media ==
=== Novels and anthologies ===
Christopher Golden has written several novels about the character, the first two of which, The Lost Army and The Bones of Giants, are part of the official Hellboy story canon. The events of both these novels are listed in the comic's official timeline featured in Hellboy: The Companion. In particular, the Golden-penned character of Anastasia Bransfield was also described in the companion, despite having never actually appeared in a comic.

1. Hellboy: The Lost Army (written by Christopher Golden, cover and other illustrations by Mike Mignola, 1997)
2. Hellboy: Odd Jobs (by editor Christopher Golden, writers include Stephen R. Bissette, Greg Rucka, Nancy A. Collins, and Poppy Z. Brite; with an introduction by Mike Mignola. Milwaukie: Dark Horse Comics, Inc., ISBN 1-56971-440-1, December 1999)
3. Hellboy: The Bones of Giants (written by Christopher Golden, cover and other illustrations by Mike Mignola, 2001)
4. Hellboy: Odder Jobs (by editor Christopher Golden, writers include Frank Darabont, Guillermo del Toro, Charles de Lint, Graham Joyce, Sharyn McCrumb, James Cambias, and Richard Dean Starr, October 2004)
5. Hellboy: On Earth As It Is In Hell (written by Brian Hodge, cover by Mike Mignola, September 2005)
6. Hellboy: Unnatural Selection (written by Tim Lebbon, cover by Mike Mignola, March 2006)
7. Hellboy: The God Machine (written by Thomas E. Sniegoski, cover by Mike Mignola, July 2006)
8. Hellboy: The Dragon Pool (written by Christopher Golden, cover by Mike Mignola, March 2007)
9. Hellboy: Emerald Hell (written by Tom Piccirilli, cover by Mike Mignola, February 2008)
10. Hellboy: The All-Seeing Eye (written by Mark Morris, cover by Mike Mignola, October 2008)
11. Hellboy: Oddest Jobs (by editor Christopher Golden, writers include Joe R. Lansdale, China Miéville, Barbara Hambly, Ken Bruen, Amber Benson, and Tad Williams, July 2008)
12. Hellboy: The Fire Wolves (written by Tim Lebbon, cover by Mike Mignola, April 2009)
13. Hellboy: The Ice Wolves (written by Mark Chadbourn, cover by Duncan Fegredo, September 2009)
14. Hellboy: An Assortment of Horrors (2017)

=== Video games ===
A Hellboy video game called Hellboy: Dogs of the Night, developed by Cryo Interactive, was released in 2000 for Microsoft Windows. It was ported to PlayStation as Hellboy: Asylum Seeker with David Gasman voicing Hellboy.

On April 6, 2005, Hellboy director Guillermo del Toro announced on his official site that he had made a deal with the developer Konami to create a new Hellboy video game based on the film version of the character and his world, featuring new monsters, new villains, and a new storyline. Herman von Klempt and his war ape Kriegaffe #10 were slated to make appearances. On May 9, 2006, it was revealed that the Hellboy game would appear in the summer of 2007, on PlayStation 3, Xbox 360, and PlayStation Portable. The game was released in North America on June 24, 2008, with the name Hellboy: The Science of Evil with Ron Perlman reprising his role. It is developed by Krome Studios, and published by Konami Digital Entertainment, Inc. As well as single-player campaign where the player gets to play as Hellboy the game also features co-op play, featuring the characters Abe Sapien and Liz Sherman. Two additional levels and Lobster Johnson as a playable character (voiced by Bruce Campbell) as DLC were developed but were unreleased.

A Hellboy video game called Hellboy II: The Golden Army – Tooth Fairy Terror was released for the iPhone by Tuesday Creative on January 14, 2009.

Hellboy is a playable DLC character in Injustice 2, voiced by Bruce Barker, as part of the "Fighter Pack 2". The character was released for download on Tuesday, November 14, 2017. He is brought to the Injustice universe by Brainiac who decides to add him to his collection as he is fascinated by Hellboy's human-like mind and personality despite being a demon. In his ending, Hellboy escapes from Brainiac's collection and defeats him. As a result, he is asked to assist in rounding up local supervillains before eventually returning to the B.P.R.D. but finds his work there unfulfilling and ends up retiring to Africa.

Hellboy appeared as a playable character in Brawlhalla.

A Hellboy roguelike video game, titled Hellboy Web of Wyrd, was released on October 18, 2023, by developer Upstream Arcade. It is available on Microsoft Windows, Nintendo Switch, PlayStation 4, PlayStation 5, Xbox One, and Xbox Series X/S. Lance Reddick voices the title character and it was one of his final productions prior to his death. The game is dedicated in his memory.

=== Tabletop games ===
In 2002, Hellboy Sourcebook and Roleplaying Game was published by Steve Jackson Games using their GURPS role-playing system, in both softcover and hardback.

Mantic Games released a Hellboy: The Board Game in 2019, after a successful crowdfunding campaign.

In 2020, Mantic Games followed up the boardgame with another Hellboy Kickstarter campaign, this time for a new Hellboy roleplaying game, using D&D 5E as a base for the game rules. The roleplaying game was released in March 2021.

=== Audio ===
A trilogy of audiobooks, produced by GraphicAudio, was released in 2023. Rather than directly adapting the narratives of Mignola's comics, the audiobooks focus instead on telling original stories written by Golden. They consist of the following: Hellboy: A Plague of Wasps, Lobster Johnson: The Proteus Club, and Hellboy and the BPRD: The Goddess of Manhattan.

== Merchandise ==
In 2008, Gentle Giant licensed action figures for the animated films. A Hellboy figure shrink-wrapped to a copy of the Blood and Iron DVD was released as a Best Buy exclusive. Other items included an 80-page digest titled The Judgment Bell from Walmart, a 64-page Hellboy Digest from Transworld, a Lobster Johnson magnet from Infinity, and a Hellboy "Bust-Up" from Circuit City. On May 22, 2017, Dark Horse Comics, XXX Distillery LLC, and Prestige Imports LLC officially released Hellboy Hell Water Cinnamon Whiskey, a small batch, naturally-flavored whiskey.

== See also ==
- List of television series and films based on Dark Horse Comics publications
- The Mask (franchise), another multi-media fantasy franchise based on Dark Horse Comics.
