= Hellboy: Conqueror Worm =

Hellboy comic book mini-series

- Cover to the trade paperback Art by Mike Mignola

Publication information
- Publisher: Dark Horse Comics
- Schedule: Monthly
- Format: Limited series
- Genre: Action/adventure, horror
- Publication date: May–August 2001
- No. of issues: 4

Creative team
- Created by: Mike Mignola
- Written by: Mike Mignola
- Artist: Mike Mignola
- Colorist: Dave Stewart

Collected editions
- Hellboy: Conqueror Worm: ISBN 1-56971-699-4

Hellboy: Conqueror Worm is a Hellboy comic book mini-series, written and drawn by Mike Mignola and published by American company Dark Horse Comics.

This work was inspired by the Edgar Allan Poe poem of the same name.

== Plot ==
In 2000, BPRD Director Tom Manning tells Hellboy and Roger that a satellite photo has captured a space capsule with a Nazi symbol reentering the atmosphere on course towards Hunte Castle in Austria, from which it was launched in 1939. A local police officer, Laura Karnstein, has offered to guide them there. In private, Manning reveals to an appalled Hellboy that Roger has been fitted with a bomb, just powerful enough to destroy him, and gives Hellboy the detonator in case the worst should happen.

Reaching the castle, Hellboy and Roger are separated and ambushed by Herman von Klempt and one of his cybernetic Kriegaffen ("war apes"). Hellboy awakes in a torture chamber, where "Karnstein" stands at von Klempt's side, revealing herself to be his granddaughter, Inger.

Roger is guided to the castle's power plant by Lobster Johnson, where he absorbs the generator's energy and deprives the castle of its power, allowing Hellboy to free himself from his restraints. Wandering through the castle, Hellboy encounters an extraterrestrial prisoner disguised as a man, who explains that the Nazis somehow made contact with ancient evil beings in space, and sent the capsule carrying a dead body for one of them to inhabit. Roger reunites with Hellboy just as the capsule lands.

Gas streams out of the capsule and transforms Inger's men into mindless frog monsters. The monstrous Conqueror Worm emerges and begins devouring the transformed men, growing larger as it does so. Inger, protected in part from the gas's effects by a gas mask, asks her grandfather how he can hope to control something like the Worm. Herman replies that he does not intend to; after the fall of the Third Reich, and the failure of his multiple projects to bring about the Nazis' planned conquest of the world, Herman no longer cares about causes, or his family, and simply wants to watch the end of the world. Inger removes her mask to realize that it has not protected her from the gas, only minimized the transformative effects, leaving her a humanoid frog creature who is just barely able to think and speak.

Von Klempt attacks Hellboy and Roger, but Roger destroys his robotic body and sends his preserved head falling off a cliff to his death. Roger initially urges Hellboy to let him get close to the Worm and then detonate the bomb, but Hellboy refuses, and instead they use Roger's body as a conductor to deliver a massive electrical shock to the Worm via a lightning rod, destroying it.

Inger is tempted by the ghost of Grigori Rasputin, who says she cannot prevent the end of the world, but can play a pivotal role in the world that will follow. Before she can act, however, she is shot dead by Lobster Johnson.

Hellboy, disgusted by the Bureau's actions toward Roger, gives the detonator back to Manning and announces that he's quitting, telling Kate Corrigan that he plans to travel to Africa, and after that "wherever the wind blows."

In an epilogue, Rasputin's ghost is confronted by Hecate, now inhabiting the body of Ilsa Haupstein imprisoned in an iron maiden. Hecate taunts Rasputin that all of his attempts to manipulate events in the living world are useless, since the only force that can release the Ogdru Jahad is Hellboy's stone right hand, and Rasputin will never control him. Rasputin screams in defiance at this with such force that his spirit shatters into bone splinters. Baba Yaga takes one of these splinters and puts it into an acorn, to wear around her neck.

== Collected editions ==
It was collected as the fifth Hellboy trade paperback:

- The Conqueror Worm (4-issue mini-series), 2001, Dark Horse Comics, tpb, 144 pages, 2002, ISBN 1-56971-699-4, 2004, ISBN 1-59307-092-6

== Awards ==
- 2002: Won "Best Finite Series/Limited Series" Eisner Award

== Bibliography ==
- The Conqueror Worm at the Comic Book DB (archived from the original)
