= Trevor Bruttenholm =

Publication information
- Publisher: Dark Horse Comics
- First appearance: Hellboy: Seed of Destruction (1994)
- Created by: Mike Mignola

In-story information
- Species: Human
- Team affiliations: B.P.R.D.
- Partnerships: Tom Manning
- Notable aliases: Professor Trevor Broom
- Abilities: Genius-level intellect Expert in supernatural and paranormal phenomena

Trevor Bruttenholm /ˈbruːm/ (alias: Prof. Trevor Broom) is a fictional character in the comic book series Hellboy, created by Mike Mignola and John Byrne. His first appearance was in the comic book Hellboy: Seed of Destruction issue #1 (1994). He is an adoptive father to titular protagonist Hellboy and one of the main characters in the series.

== Fictional character biography ==
An English academic well versed in the supernatural, Trevor Bruttenholm was a member of the British Paranormal Society. He was an advisor to U.S. President Franklin D. Roosevelt when the Allies realized that the Nazi leader Adolf Hitler was racing to use the occult to turn the tide of World War II. Project Ragna Rok, a plan to use black magic to win the war, was put in place by the supposedly deceased mystic Rasputin. However, on December 23, 1944 in East Bromwich, England, a youthful demon came into the possession of Bruttenholm, not Rasputin. Rasputin retreated to the Arctic and Bruttenholm named the creature 'Hellboy'.

Bruttenholm and Hellboy developed a very strong emotional bond like that of a father and son, and both joined the U.S. Government's new Bureau of Paranormal Research and Defense. The two worked closely together to combat supernatural threats to the world. Bruttenholm eventually retired from the Bureau and returned to field work. His position was taken over by Tom Manning, who is the current Bureau director.

An aged Bruttenholm disappeared in 1992 during the Cavendish expedition to the Arctic Circle. Bruttenholm turned up, alive, in 1994 during the Seed of Destruction arc. Before he could explain himself to Hellboy, he was murdered by a 'frog monster', the first of thousands of such beasts the Bureau would eventually face. Bruttenholm's death signalled the first contact Hellboy would have with emissaries of the Ogdru Jahad. The man who was ultimately responsible for Bruttenholm's death was a revitalized Rasputin, whom Bruttenholm had encountered in the North. Hellboy stopped Rasputin's plans to free the Ogdru Jahad and saw the mystic burn alive for his crime.

== In other media ==
=== Live action films ===
==== Hellboy (2004) ====
Trevor Bruttenholm appears in the 2004 motion picture Hellboy, first as a young man in 1944 (played by Kevin Trainor), then as the B.P.R.D.'s aging director in the 2000s (played by John Hurt).

In the film, "Broom" accompanies the team of American commandos to stop Rasputin from initiating Project Ragna Rok. He receives a bullet in the leg from Karl Ruprecht Kroenen that causes him to limp for the rest of his life, but throws a hand grenade under the portal machine that both destroys the machine and maims Kroenen as he is attempting to retrieve it. When the infant Hellboy appears, Broom adopts him and dedicates himself to raising Hellboy as a human, despite his demonic origins. The film makes the father-son relationship between the two characters more explicit, with Hellboy always calling Broom "Father."

As the movie begins in the present, Broom discovers that he is dying of cancer, and selects the young agent John Myers to serve as Hellboy's new liaison. He is killed by Rasputin as part of a plot to lure Hellboy to Rasputin's grave, where he can fulfil the purpose he was summoned to Earth for. Before he is killed, Rasputin taunts him, saying that Broom has effectively nurtured a creature with the power, and the destiny, to bring about the Apocalypse, and also shows him a vision of the post-apocalyptic remains of New York City, with the Ogdru Jahad looming overhead and Hellboy, with regenerated horns, standing in the center. Broom returns that he will always see Hellboy as his son, Rasputin respectfully promises the death will be quick and Broom accepts his fate and allows Kroenen to kill him.

When Hellboy is about to unlock the key that will release the Ogdru Jahad from their prison as Anung un Rama, Myers stops him by throwing him a rosary that belonged to Broom, a reminder that Broom raised him to choose his own path – upon which Hellboy tears away his re-grown horns and kills Rasputin rather than turn the final key.

Comic creator Mike Mignola was struck by how closely Hurt resembled his original illustrations of Bruttenholm.

==== Hellboy II: The Golden Army ====
Bruttenholm only appeared in the sequel film's flashback prologue, Hellboy II: The Golden Army, played again by Hurt. Taking place in 1955, the middle-aged Bruttenholm is raising the young Hellboy in secret on a U.S. Air Force base in New Mexico. On Christmas Eve, he reads his "son" a story about the creation of the Golden Army. In the present, Hellboy wears his father's rosary beads on his wrist, like a bracelet.

==== Hellboy (2019) ====
Ian McShane portrayed Professor Trevor Bruttenholm in the film reboot Hellboy. This version of Trevor was a narrator in the prologue and as a member of the Osiris Club. At the end of World War II, Trevor's mission was to accompany Lobster Johnson to kill Hellboy upon his arrival during the Nazis' Project Ragna Rok, but he couldn't. Trevor instead raised Hellboy as his "son", when their relationship is strained as Hellboy doesn't take orders from him, if Trevor tries to make Hellboy the best himself. Later In the climax in London, Broom was abducted and soon killed by Nimue when Hellboy refuses to withdraw Excalibur that enrages him to. While the demons are spreading around the world, Alice Monaghan channels Broom's spirit to encourage Hellboy to decapitate Nimue, returning her and all demons to hell. After revealing the truth about Hellboy's arrival, Broom bids farewell to his adopted son.

=== Animated films ===
==== Hellboy Animated: Blood and Iron ====
Trevor Bruttenholm also appeared in the straight-to-DVD animated film Hellboy: Blood and Iron, voiced as a young man by James Arnold Taylor, and as an elderly man by Hurt again.

In the film, a series of flashbacks (in reverse chronological order) show the young Bruttenholm traveling to Eastern Europe to combat Erzebet Andrushko, an evil vampiress who has been terrorizing Transylvania. He emerges victorious, though the only survivor of his team.

Sixty years later, he is still a member of the Bureau, though no longer Director of Field Operations. Experiencing recurring nightmares of Erzebet's resurrection, he suggests that the entire team be sent on an apparently trivial mission in the Hamptons, where Erzebet's disciples are indeed working to bring her back. Despite the dangerous creatures fought by the other members of the team, it is Bruttenholm who confronts Erzebet, alone, and manages, despite his age, to outwit and destroy her again.
