= Hellboy (2019 film) =

2019 film by Neil Marshall

- Theatrical release poster
- Directed by: Neil Marshall
- Screenplay by: Andrew Cosby
- Based on: Hellboy by Mike Mignola
- Produced by: Lawrence Gordon; Lloyd Levin; Mike Richardson; Philip Westgren; Carl Hampe; Matt O'Toole; Les Weldon; Yariv Lerner
- Starring: David Harbour; Milla Jovovich; Ian McShane; Sasha Lane; Daniel Dae Kim; Thomas Haden Church
- Cinematography: Lorenzo Senatore
- Edited by: Martin Bernfeld
- Music by: Benjamin Wallfisch
- Production companies: Summit Entertainment; Millennium Media; Lawrence Gordon/Lloyd Levin Productions; Dark Horse Entertainment; Nu Boyana; Campbell Grobman Films
- Distributed by: Lionsgate
- Release dates: April 9, 2019 (New York City); April 12, 2019 (United States)
- Running time: 121 minutes
- Countries: Bulgaria; United States
- Language: English
- Budget: $50 million
- Box office: $55.1 million (Note: The film grossed $44.7 million during its original theatrical run in 2019. The film earned an additional $10.4 million after it was released in China in November 2020, raising its worldwide gross to $55 million.)

Hellboy (Note: Released as Hellboy: Call of Darkness in some markets.) is a 2019 superhero film based on the Dark Horse Comics character. A reboot of the Hellboy film series, it is the third live-action entry in the franchise. Directed by Neil Marshall, the film stars David Harbour in the title role, alongside Milla Jovovich, Ian McShane, Sasha Lane, Daniel Dae Kim, and Thomas Haden Church. The film draws inspiration from the comic books Darkness Calls, The Wild Hunt, The Storm and the Fury, and Hellboy in Mexico. In the film, Hellboy struggles with his psyche while preventing a resurrected sorceress from conquering the world.

The project began as a sequel to Hellboy II: The Golden Army (2008), with screenwriter Andrew Cosby and Mignola writing the script. Guillermo del Toro was not offered the full writer-director role he had performed in the previous films, and Ron Perlman, who had portrayed Hellboy, refused to return without del Toro's involvement. The project was reworked as an R-rated reboot after Marshall was hired as the director and Harbour cast as Hellboy. Principal photography began in September 2017 in the United Kingdom and Bulgaria, and ended in December.

Hellboy had its premiere in New York City on April 9, 2019, and was released in the United States on April 12, by Lionsgate. The film received negative reviews from critics, with criticism aimed at the story, inconsistent tone, and excessive gore, along with unfavorable comparisons to the del Toro films, but praise for the make-up effects and Harbour's performance. The film bombed at the box office, grossing $55.1 million against a $50 million production budget.

A second reboot of the film series, titled Hellboy: The Crooked Man, was released in 2024.

== Plot ==
In 517 A.D., the evil Blood Queen, Vivienne Nimue, unleashes a plague on England until King Arthur thwarts her with the aid of Ganeida, a member of her coven. Arthur uses Excalibur to dismember Nimue and hides her remains across England. In present-day Tijuana, Mexico, paranormal investigator Hellboy accidentally kills missing agent Esteban Ruiz, who has been transformed into a vampire, during a wrestling match. After hearing Ruiz's dying words, prophesying that the end is coming, Hellboy is brought back to the B.P.R.D. in Colorado. He is assigned by B.P.R.D. leader Trevor Bruttenholm, his adoptive human father, to assist the Osiris Club in hunting three giants in Great Britain. The club's seer, Lady Hatton, reveals Bruttenholm was meant to kill Hellboy when he came into the human world as a result of the Nazis' Project Ragna Rok but instead raised him. Meanwhile, a pig-like fairy known as Gruagach is advised by the witch Baba Yaga to retrieve Nimue's limbs so that she may grant his wish for revenge against Hellboy.

During the hunt, Hellboy is betrayed and nearly killed by the hunters before they are ambushed by the giants. Hellboy fights and kills the giants until he collapses from exhaustion, only to be rescued by a young woman. He awakens in her flat, recognizing her as Alice Monaghan, a medium he once rescued from fairies as a baby. Sending a team to retrieve Hellboy, Bruttenholm introduces Hellboy to M11 agent Ben Daimio and relays that Nimue's remains have been taken, and the last piece is stored at the Osiris Club. Finding the club slain, Alice channels Hatton's spirit, who reveals that Nimue seeks Hellboy to cause the apocalypse. Nimue's arm is taken by Gruagach, and Nimue distracts Hellboy by appealing to his frustrations, allowing Gruagach to escape. Hellboy reveals that Gruagach is a changeling who took baby Alice's place before Hellboy branded him with iron and forced him to return Alice, which led to Gruagach hating Hellboy for taking his chance to be human.

Daimio takes them to M11 headquarters before secretly acquiring a special bullet to kill Hellboy. After an argument with Bruttenholm about his adoption, Hellboy angrily storms off until he is magically transported to Baba Yaga's house. Having shot out Baba Yaga's eye, Hellboy is talked into giving up one of his eyes for Nimue's location. Hellboy reneges on the deal and is cursed to lose a loved one. On the way to Nimue's location at Pendleton, Daimio reveals to Alice that he was the sole survivor of a demonic jaguar attack.

Nimue fully restores herself and kills her coven, but spares Ganeida. Hellboy attempts to stop her, but is overwhelmed. Nimue poisons Alice and flees, as Ganeida directs Hellboy to the resting place of Merlin to save Alice. After Merlin cures Alice and puts her and Daimio to sleep, he reveals that Hellboy is Anung un Rama, the firstborn male heir of Arthur through his mother, who was spirited to Hell by his father. When offered Excalibur, Hellboy refuses after seeing a vision of himself causing the apocalypse, while Merlin, having exhausted his magic, disintegrates.

Meanwhile, Nimue attacks M11 and abducts Bruttenholm as the group follows her to St Paul's Cathedral. Hellboy battles an empowered Gruagach aided by Daimio in his jaguar form. However, Nimue betrays and kills Gruagach and propels Hellboy into Arthur's hidden tomb that holds Excalibur. Nimue kills Bruttenholm and an enraged Hellboy pulls out the sword, allowing demons to emerge from Hell. Alice channels Bruttenholm's spirit to appeal to Hellboy's humanity, allowing him to decapitate Nimue and toss her head into Hell after the demons are sent back. Hellboy and Bruttenholm exchange farewells and Daimio discards the special bullet.

Six months later, Hellboy, Daimio and Alice raid the Oannes Society where they find the water tank of Abe Sapien. In a mid-credits scene, Hellboy is consoled at Bruttenholm's grave by the ghost of his hero Lobster Johnson. In a post-credits scene, Baba Yaga enlists an unseen force to seek out Hellboy with the promise of allowing him to finally die.

== Cast ==
- David Harbour as Hellboy / Anung Un Rama: A powerful demon who works for the government organization Bureau for Paranormal Research and Defense (B.P.R.D.). Harbour was suggested for the role by Mignola after having seen his work on Stranger Things. Harbour stated that the film would be a "character piece" and feature mature themes and "complicated subjects" that warrant the film's R-rating, stating, "It really is this study of this man going through this horrible conundrum and we really get to go in deep with him." Mignola stated that Harbour had been researching the character, adding, "He's texting me Hellboy questions about his history, about what the character would think about this or about that." Mignola described Harbour's Hellboy as being more dramatic, gritty, and emotionally explosive than Perlman's. Harbour refrained from imitating Perlman's Hellboy by depicting his own version similar to a "teenager," describing him as "younger" and "rougher," stating, "He's really struggling with the idea of whether or not he's a good person."
- Milla Jovovich as Vivienne Nimue, the Blood Queen: A powerful British sorceress from the Dark Ages, who seeks to annihilate humanity. Harbour had stated that Hellboy has a "very special relationship" with Nimue and that the film expands her role from the comics. Jovovich described the character as being "literally the queen of the underworld," serving as the mother of the monsters, and described Nimue's plan as "beautiful" and "relevant" to today's political climate in trying to bring people together.
- Ian McShane as Professor Trevor "Broom" Bruttenholm: Hellboy's adoptive father and the founder of the B.P.R.D. He, Satton, and Lord Glaren of the Osirus Club were given decelerated aging by a powerful spirit through a seance that made them aware of the potential threat that Hellboy posed. Harbour stated that their version of Bruttenholm is a much harder character who does not sympathize with Hellboy questioning his place in the world.
- Sasha Lane as Alice Monaghan: A young woman of part Irish descent, who became a powerful medium after she was kidnapped by fairies as a baby. Harbour stated that the character "gets to play with some really interesting ideas of, sort of, being a witch and having visions".
- Daniel Dae Kim as Ben Daimio: An M11 military and agent member of the B.P.R.D. who, due to a supernatural encounter, can turn into a terrifying werejaguar when angered or in pain and uses injections to suppress the transformations. Ed Skrein was originally cast in the role but upon discovering that Daimio was portrayed in the comics as Japanese-American, he withdrew to allow an Asian actor to be cast instead. A month later, Kim was cast in the role.
- Stephen Graham (voice) and Douglas Tait (on-set; uncredited) as Gruagach: A pig-like fairy who restored Nimue to exact revenge on Hellboy. Graham provides the voice for Gruagach while Tait provides the physical performance.
- Sophie Okonedo as Lady Hatton: A resident seer at the Osiris Club, an ancient English club dedicated to uncovering supernatural mysteries.
- Alistair Petrie as Lord Adam Glaren: A high-ranking member of the Osiris Club.
- Brian Gleeson as Merlin: An ancient and powerful sorcerer, a figure of Arthurian legend.
- Penelope Mitchell as Ganeida: An elder witch who has decided that Nimue's wrath has gone on for too long and must be stopped.
- Mark Stanley as King Arthur: The ruler of Camelot who is based on the figure of Arthurian legend.
- Thomas Haden Church as Lobster Johnson: A vigilante with a violent reputation as he killed mobsters and Nazis while burning his trademark lobster claw symbol into their foreheads with the palm of his gloved hand.
- Emma Tate (voice) and Troy James (on-set) as Baba Yaga: A one-eyed Russian witch who lives in a chicken-leg house, having lost her right eye to Hellboy in the past. Tate provides the voice for Baba Yaga, while James provides the on-screen performance.

Additionally, Mario de la Rosa plays Esteban Ruiz / Camazotz, Ava Brennan and Anthony Delaney play Alice's mother and father, respectively. Atanas Srebrev and Dawn Sherrer appear as Agent Madison and Agent Strode, respectively, while Markos Rounthwaite plays Grigori Rasputin and Vanessa Eicholz appears as Ilsa Hepstein. Ilko Iliev plays Professor Doctor Karl Ruprect Kroenen, Joel Harlow portrays Von Krupt, Dimiter Banenkin plays Leopold Kurtz, and Kristina Klebe portrays Leni Riefenstahl.

== Production ==
=== Development ===
In 2014, Hellboy creator Mike Mignola began work with writer Andrew Cosby on the story for a new film. The project was initially intended as a sequel to Guillermo del Toro's films Hellboy and Hellboy II: The Golden Army, which starred Ron Perlman as the title character. Del Toro was offered a producer credit, but declined, wishing instead to direct his own script for Hellboy III, and Perlman refused to return without del Toro's involvement. When Neil Marshall joined, it was decided that the new film would instead be a reboot. Marshall signed on to direct the film due to not making a feature film in nine years and also being initially intrigued by the horror pitch. In May 2017, Mignola announced on his personal Facebook page that the reboot, then titled Hellboy: Rise of the Blood Queen, would be directed by Marshall and star David Harbour as the eponymous character. Mignola also stated that the film would have an R-rating. At the time, it was targeted for a 2018 release. Andrew Cosby had stated that the film would be a "darker, more gruesome version of Hellboy". Harbour further elaborated on the film's R-rating, "This movie is gory, I mean it's like a horror movie. There's a lot of blood in it. It's brutal."

Mignola said that he would have minimal involvement with the reboot, acting more as a "co-executive producer" and without participating in pre-production or design, stating, "When the decision was made to do another movie, I got involved, basically saying, 'If you're going to do that story, don't do this, or that, change this, and that.' I helped to steer it. Christopher Golden and I did write a couple of drafts of the screenplay and got it on track, and then the decision was made to do a reboot." In August 2017, the film dropped the subtitle Rise of the Blood Queen and was re-titled simply Hellboy.

=== Writing ===
When the project was announced, it was revealed that Mignola had written early drafts with Andrew Cosby and Christopher Golden, and that Mignola would develop a new draft with Aron Eli Coleite. On the tone of the film, Cosby stated, "Neil said from the very beginning that he wanted to walk a razor's edge between horror and comic book movie, which was music to my ears, because that's what I was shooting for in the script, and precisely what Mignola does so well with the comics." Mignola confirmed that the film draws inspiration from Darkness Calls, The Wild Hunt, and The Storm and the Fury, but also pulls "bits and pieces from other stories", such as Hellboy in Mexico. Mignola did not want to make another origin story, feeling that del Toro had already succeeded with that story. Mignola felt the three-book arc gave the filmmakers an "entryway" back into the world of Hellboy and allowed them to expand beyond the comic. A poster with final credits revealed Cosby retained sole screenwriter credit.

=== Creature design ===
Makeup designer Joel Harlow wanted to make the monsters and settings of Hellboy "believable within the context of the world they inhabit". The design team attempted not to reference the designs of the del Toro films and took inspiration from the comics. Harlow attempted to stay faithful to the source material, and consulted with Mignola on any new designs to make sure they matched the tone of the comics. Harlow added Harbour's facial features into the initial Hellboy maquette sculpt to capture his likeness into the character. Harlow felt Harbour's Hellboy gave an "imposing presence" after the makeup and body suit were applied.

For the horned version of Hellboy, Harlow chose to make that version an "amped up" design of the regular horned Hellboy, stating, "We gave him a larger jaw, a heavier brow, a more vibrant yellow eye look, larger teeth and, of course, extremely large horns." Harlow wanted "real-world representations" of the horned version by adding scars, feeling they made Hellboy feel gritty, and were appropriate for an R-rated version of the character. The decision for a lack of a top-knot was due to this version of Hellboy being portrayed younger than the comic iteration. For the creatures of Hell, Harlow wanted them to look different from the film's other beasts, stating, "Their look is entirely nonhuman and very frightening. It's a glimpse into a world of beings that do not follow the anatomical laws of anything terrestrial."

=== Casting ===
David Harbour was the first actor to be cast for the film, in the role of Hellboy. In August 2017, Ian McShane was added as Trevor Bruttenholm. On August 8, 2017, Milla Jovovich was cast as the main antagonist, the Blood Queen, and on August 15, 2017, Sasha Lane was set to play Alice Monaghan. On August 21, Ed Skrein was cast as Ben Daimio; however, Skrein voluntarily dropped out of the film on August 28 following accusations of "whitewashing" the role he was set to play, stating, "It is clear that representing this character in a culturally accurate way holds significance for people, and that to neglect this responsibility would continue a worrying tendency to obscure ethnic minority stories and voices in the Arts. I feel it is important to honor and respect that. Therefore, I have decided to step down so the role can be cast appropriately." On August 30, 2017, Penelope Mitchell joined the cast as Ganeida.

In September 2017, Daniel Dae Kim was cast to replace Skrein in the role of Daimio. Kim has praised Skrein for dropping the role, stating, "I applaud the producers and, in particular, Ed Skrein for championing the notion that Asian characters should be played by Asian or Asian American actors." The two later met and became acquainted, with Kim saying, "Thanks for the opportunity to get to know each other in person. Grateful to now call you 'friend'." In November 2018, it was revealed that Thomas Haden Church had a role in the film as vigilante Lobster Johnson. The same month, it was also announced that Stephen Graham and Douglas Tait portray the fairy Gruagach, with Graham as the voice and Tait providing the in-camera performance. Doug Jones (who had played Abe Sapien in the del Toro films) was offered a cameo but was unable to participate due to commitments to Star Trek: Discovery.

=== Filming ===
Hellboy began principal production in September 2017 and filmed in the United Kingdom and Bulgaria. Filming wrapped on December 27, 2017. During Hellboy's opening weekend, TheWrap published a report that revealed tensions during the film's production. The report stated that producers Lawrence Gordon and Lloyd Levin had chosen to fire the original cinematographer and director Marshall's collaborator, Sam McCurdy. Insiders suggested McCurdy's termination was meant to be a "message" to Marshall that he was not in charge; however, Levin's attorney, Martin Singer, denied the allegation and described McCurdy's termination as a "group decision". Singer accused Marshall of "encouraging" the story.

Three insiders stated that Levin frequently interrupted Marshall before the cast and crew during rehearsals and attempted to give the actors different directions from Marshall's. Singer denied the claim, stating that Levin talked to Marshall after rehearsals. Two insiders stated that Harbour walked off set, refusing to film more takes for Marshall. Singer countered that Levin had no recollection of the incident. Two insiders stated that the script was rewritten on-set and that Harbour and McShane rewrote their lines. Singer disputed that this was a common practice among film productions. One insider stated that Marshall and Levin had disputes over the design of a tree. Marshall wanted a realistic, asymmetrical design while Levin opted for a symmetrical design and overruled Marshall's decision. However, Marshall changed the design to asymmetrical during post-production. Singer denied the claim, stating that all the designs in the film went through an "exhaustive design and evolution process". All parties involved refused to comment on the report.

=== Post-production ===
The visual effects were provided by Mr. X, Rhythm & Hues, Rise FX and Worldwide FX, supervised by Chris MacLean, James Cooper, John Haley, Markus Degen, Veselina Georgieva, Matt Kasmir and Steve Begg, with the help of Goodbye Kansas Studios, Nu Boyana FX, Onirikal Studio and Nzivage. Marshall did not retain final cut over the film.

=== Music ===
The soundtrack is composed by Benjamin Wallfisch. The first trailer featured a cover version of "Mony Mony" by Billy Idol while the second trailer featured a cover version of “Smoke on the Water" by 2WEI. The soundtrack was released at Sony Masterworks, and includes Wallfisch's score and a Spanish-language version of the song "Rock You Like a Hurricane", performed by Unprotected Innocence (Micki Milosevic and Steph Honde).

== Release ==
=== Marketing ===
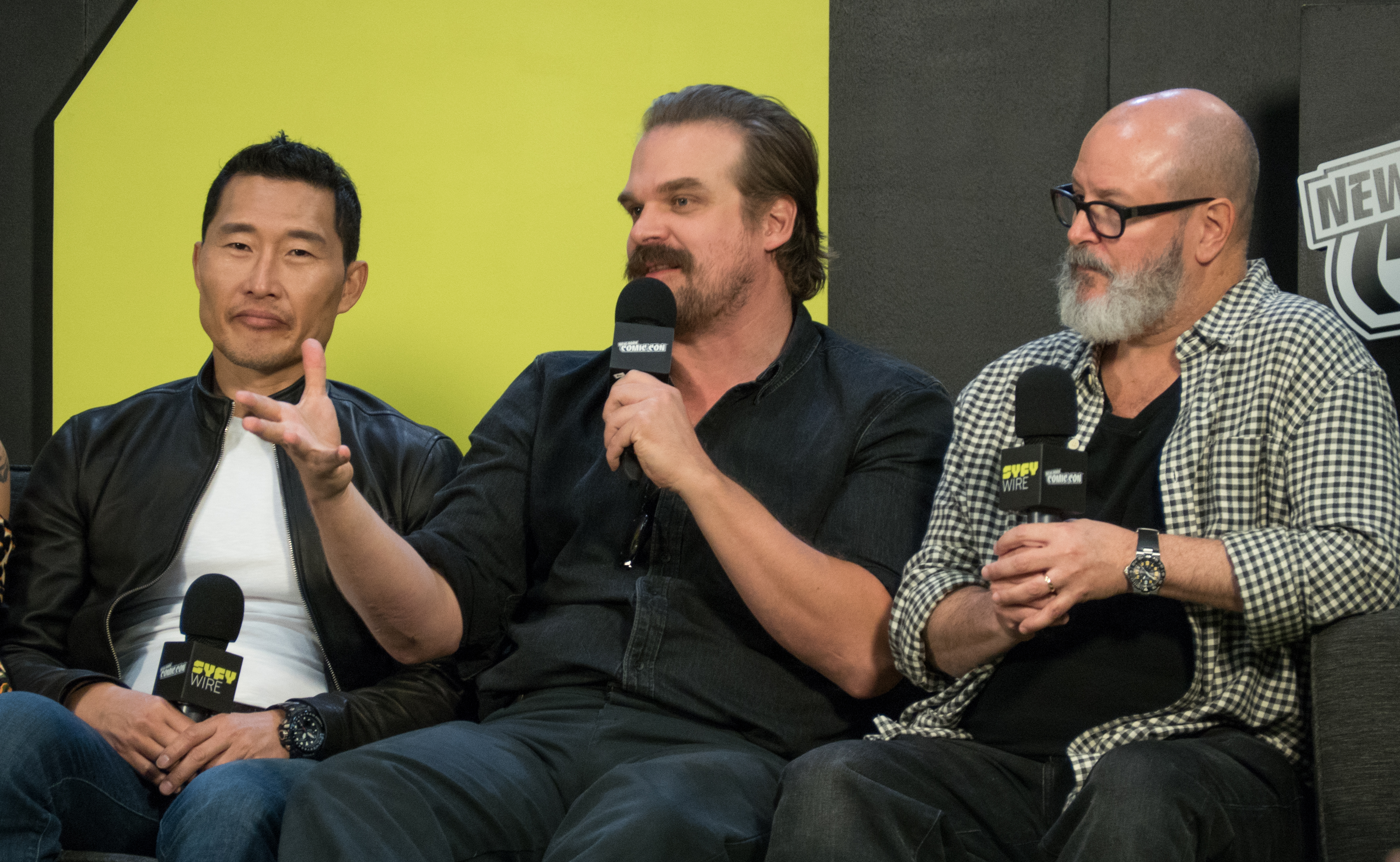
Daniel Dae Kim, David Harbour, and Mike Mignola during an interview at New York Comic Con in October 2018

On October 6, 2018, the cast and crew attended a panel for the film at the New York Comic Con. A poster revealing the film's principal characters and a two-minute reel of footage were revealed to those in attendance; it received praise from attendees. The footage was leaked online a week later. On December 19, 2018, the first official trailer was released, which drew mixed reactions from fans, with some excited for the film and others comparing it to Suicide Squad. On March 1, 2019, a red band trailer was released online. The second trailer had a more positive response from fans, with many calling it a huge improvement from the first trailer.

=== Theatrical ===
In November 2018, Lionsgate held test screenings in Los Angeles, which generated negative reactions. Hellboy had its premiere in New York City on April 9, 2019, and was released in the United States on April 12, 2019, in IMAX. The film was previously scheduled to be released on January 11, 2019. Hellboy was released in France on May 8, 2019, in Spain on May 17, 2019, in Brazil on May 26, 2019, and in Hong Kong on June 20, 2019. It was released in Japan on September 27, 2019. The film was released in China on November 9, 2020. Prior to its Chinese release, the Maoyan data platform confirmed that 24,000 Chinese consumers had shown interest in seeing the film.

=== Home media ===
Hellboy was released on Digital on July 9, 2019, and on Blu-ray, DVD, and 4K Ultra HD on July 23, 2019. The home media release was accompanied by retail exclusives from Best Buy, Target, and Walmart. Best Buy released an exclusive 4K steelbook featuring artwork by Mike Mignola. Target released a Blu-ray double-sided steelbook featuring two of the film's theatrical posters. Walmart included a digital copy of Hellboy: The Wild Hunt for in-store purchases of the Blu-ray or DVD. The film's disc release debuted #2 on Blu-ray and DVD sales charts the week that ended July 27, and #3 on disc rental charts; with 68% of its disc sales coming from Blu-ray, and 17% of its sales coming from 4K UHD. In the United States and Canada, the DVD earned $3.3 million and the Blu-ray earned $8.5 million, totaling in $11.9 million in domestic video sales.

== Reception ==
=== Box office ===
Hellboy grossed $21.9 million in the United States and Canada, and $33.2 million in other territories, for a worldwide total of $55.1 million, against a production budget of $50 million. Digital Spy ranked the film #2 in its list of "biggest movie flops of 2019," stating, "There just wasn't the excitement for it and with better options on offer (Shazam!, Avengers: Endgame and Captain Marvel), even the overseas market couldn't save it." Business Insider added the film to its list of "16 biggest box-office flops of 2019", stating, "Hellboy failed to spark excitement this year due to a poor release date, awful reviews, and other factors." Forbes called the film's box office results a "bomb," stating, "the character just wasn't a draw in 2019".

In the United States and Canada, the film was released alongside Little, Missing Link and After, and was initially projected to gross $17–21 million from 3,303 theaters in its opening weekend. However, after making $4.9 million on its first day (including $1.38 million from Thursday night previews), estimates were lowered to $12 million. It ended up debuting to $12.1 million, finishing third, behind holdover Shazam!, and Little. The sub-par opening was blamed on the poor critical reception, as well as a lack of interest in the franchise from audiences. In its second weekend the film dropped 68%, earning $3.9 million and finishing tenth.

=== Critical response ===
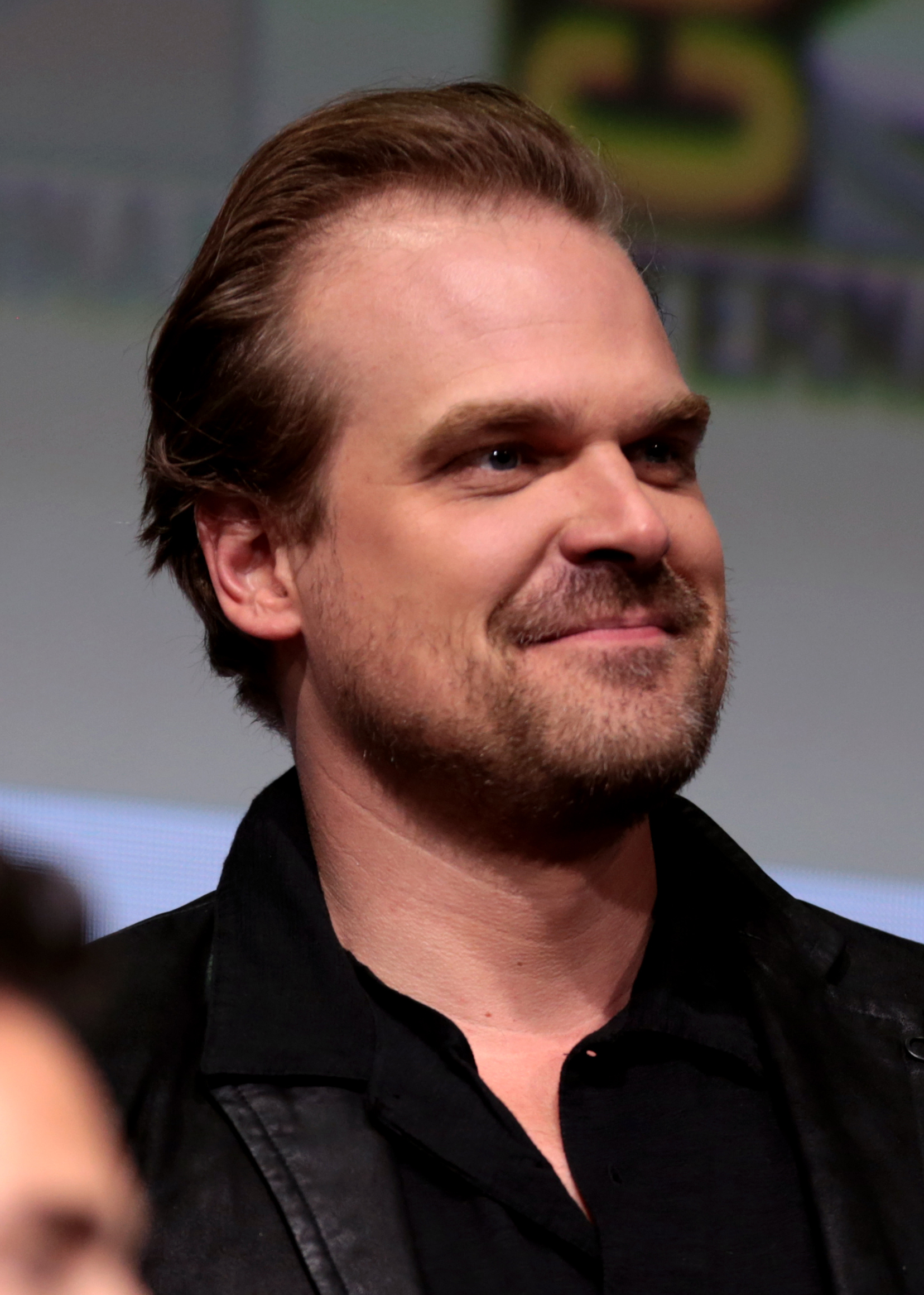
Despite negative reviews for the film, David Harbour was praised for his performance as Hellboy.

On Rotten Tomatoes, the film has an approval rating of 17% based on 225 reviews and an average rating of 3.9/10. The site's critical consensus reads, "Bereft of the imaginative flair that made earlier Hellboys so enjoyable, this soulless reboot suggests Dante may have left a tenth circle out of his Inferno." On Metacritic, the film has a weighted average score of 31 out of 100, based on 44 critics, indicating "generally unfavorable" reviews. Audiences polled by CinemaScore gave the film an average grade of "C" on an A+ to F scale, while those at PostTrak gave it 2.5 out of 5 stars and a "definite recommend" of 44%.

Owen Gleiberman of Variety said the film wants "to be a badass hard-R epic, but it's basically a pile of origin-story gobbledygook, frenetic and undercooked, full of limb-hacking, eye-gouging monster battles as well as an atmosphere of apocalyptic grunge that signifies next to nothing". John Defore of The Hollywood Reporter said that "Neil Marshall's Hellboy isn't lousy because nobody wants it, nor only because it fails to live up to both its big-screen and printed predecessors. It's just lousy. Bloated, vastly less funny than it aims to be and misguided in key design choices even when it scores with less important decisions, the film does make bold choices that might have paid off under other circumstances. But these aren't those circumstances." Eric Kohn of IndieWire described the film "as an overzealous attempt to revisit the content of del Toro films without matching their sophistication." Katie Rife of The A.V. Club gave it a C−, praising the creature and set design but saying "unfortunately that's where the creativity in this film ends". Rife praised Jovovich for giving "the most committed, and therefore the best, performance in the film."

Johnny Oleksinski of the New York Post called the film a "grotesque misfire", writing, "The race for worst movie of the year is heating up. You could even say it's hotter than hell, now that Hellboy has taken the lead". Phil de Semlyen for Time Out wrote, "We get a conventional, if blood-soaked, splurge of folklore, origin story, comic-book fan service and monster movie, all set to a bustling blues-rock soundtrack. Knitting it all very loosely together is a barrage of exposition involving Milla Jovovich's evil Arthurian blood queen Nimue, a.k.a. the Lady in the Lake, and the threat of another cinematic apocalypse. It feels like you've seen it all before, and if you caught Joe Cornish's The Kid Who Would Be King, you have." Robbie Collin of The Daily Telegraph described the film as "Ugly, obnoxious and yowlingly witless, with nothing to say for itself that doesn't start with the letter F." John Nugent of Empire gave the film two out of five, but praised Harbour, saying "David Harbour is brilliant, everyone around him less so". He was also critical of the film's "alarmingly bad English accents". Kim Newman wrote: "Though it covers a lot of ground – with punch-ups staged on significant sites of British magic, from Pendle Hill to St Paul's – this is fairly anonymous, with little of the distinctive grit of Marshall’s strongest works."

William Bibbiani of TheWrap gave the film a positive review, calling it "a horrifyingly good time", and adding, "Neil Marshall's Hellboy is a wellspring of creativity, a major superhero movie made for hardcore R-rated horror fans, overflowing with humor and action and scares".

=== Response from crew ===
On the film's negative reception, Harbour felt the film was unfairly compared to Marvel films and reflected, "We did our best, but there's so many voices that go into these things and they're not always going to work out. I did what I could do and I feel proud of what I did, but ultimately I'm not in control of a lot of those things." Harbour also expressed his doubts whether a sequel would be produced, stating, "I don't think the perception was that it was a hit, and so in that way, I don't know that the risk is worth it." Harbour later stated he thought the film failed due to fans of the del Toro films prematurely dismissing a reboot that did not involve del Toro or Perlman.

Milla Jovovich stated that all her "raddest films have been slammed by critics" and argued that Hellboy would become a cult classic, due to her past films receiving cult followings years after their initial negative responses. She also praised her fellow cast members and director Neil Marshall for their work on the film, and said that fans would "have a blast" watching it, despite negative reviews.

Director Neil Marshall has disowned the film, stating, "It was just God awful. It's not a film that I would consider to be part of my canon." Marshall blamed the producers for interfering and contradicting his directions during principal photography and post-production. He elaborated further on his experience during the production:

"It was the worst professional experience of my life. The script was shit. The decision to make the film was a mistake. I signed up to it because they pitched this idea of 'we want to do the horror version of Hellboy. We want to bring you and make a really darker, horror version.' And then I quickly found out that A: the script was terrible. B: it was never going to get better before we shot it, despite many attempts. You can't polish a turd, no matter how much you try. And I would have all creative control taken away from me to extreme levels. There's nothing of me in that movie."

=== Accolades ===
Awards and nominations for Hellboy
Award	Date of ceremony	Category	Recipients	Result
20th Annual Golden Trailer Awards	May 2019	Golden Fleece TV Spot (for a Feature Film)	Hellboy "Then What"	Won
20th Annual Golden Trailer Awards	May 2019	Trashiest Trailer	Hellboy "Big Red"	Nominated
40th Golden Raspberry Awards	March 16, 2020	Worst Director	Neil Marshall	Nominated
40th Golden Raspberry Awards	March 16, 2020	Worst Actor	David Harbour	Nominated
40th Golden Raspberry Awards	March 16, 2020	Worst Screenplay	Andrew Cosby	Nominated
40th Golden Raspberry Awards	March 16, 2020	Worst Prequel, Remake, Rip-off or Sequel		Nominated
40th Golden Raspberry Awards	March 16, 2020	Worst Reckless Disregard for Human Life and Public Property		Nominated

== Reboot ==
In February 2023, Millennium Media announced plans for a new live-action reboot titled Hellboy: The Crooked Man, the first in a potential series of films. Brian Taylor directed from a script by Mignola and Golden, based on the 2008 comic of the same name, with Jack Kesy as Hellboy. The film was released direct-to-VOD in the United States on October 8, 2024.
