= Karl Ruprect Kroenen =

Hellboy supervillain

Karl Ruprecht Kroenen

Publication information
- Publisher: Dark Horse Comics
- First comic appearance: Hellboy: Seed of Destruction #1
- Created by: Mike Mignola

In-story information
- Team affiliations: Nazi Germany, Project Ragna Rok
- Partnerships: Rasputin

Altered in-story information for adaptations to other media
- Full name: Karl Ruprecht Kroenen
- Abilities: Immortality; Superhuman agility, stamina, and durability Expert in hand-to-hand combat and swordfighting

Professor Doctor Karl Ruprecht Kroenen is a supervillain in the Hellboy comic book series, created by Mike Mignola. Kroenen is a Nazi occult scientist and disciple of Rasputin who was involved in the ritual that first brought Hellboy to Earth in the 1940s; disappearing after the end of World War II, Kroenen and several allies return from suspended animation in the 1990s to continue pursuing their apocalyptic goals. Due to a disfiguring accident, Kroenen always wears a gas mask and bodysuit that together obscure his entire body.

This character was greatly revised and adapted, as Karl Ruprecht Kroenen, for the 2004 film adaptation Hellboy. Writer-director Guillermo del Toro reimagined the scientist as an undying assassin.

He may have been based on the real Karl Ruprecht, an Austrian born in Gratkorn on June 19, 1910, who became a Nazi official and folklorist in 1934.

== Fictional character biography ==
Karl Ruprecht Kroenen's early life and including his date and place of birth, is largely unknown. The young Kroenen developed an interest in science, demonstrating great surgical aptitude, and pursued often unethical experiments. In 1930, Kroenen sustained severe injuries from an experimental power source; after undergoing life-saving surgery from his friend Herman von Klempt, he was never seen again without protective gear covering him from head to toe. He was able to return the favor in 1936: when an explosion nearly killed von Klempt, Kroenen and fellow scientist Leopold Kurtz were able to save von Klempt's head in a jar.

Kroenen joined the Nazi Party's German Occult Bureau in 1935, and was among the bureau members recruited by Rasputin in 1937 for his doomsday project "Ragna Rok". Project Ragna Rok came to a head on December 23, 1944. Mechanical devices designed by Kroenen were utilized by Rasputin in a ritual meant to summon the Ogdru Jahad, monstrous entities that would ensure a Nazi victory in the war. Though nothing seemed to occur (unbeknownst to those present, a red demonic child suddenly appeared in a churchyard miles away), Rasputin was sure that "a miracle" had taken place. Though Kroenen was not seen after these events, with his whereabouts unknown by the end of the war, he had followed Rasputin's directions to a cryogenic chamber in Norway and remained frozen there for decades alongside fellow disciples Kurtz and Ilsa Haupstein. In May 1994, at the moment of Rasputin's death, the chamber began to thaw Kroenen and his Ragna Rok compatriots.

The resuscitated Ragna Rok members resumed their work by 1995, with industrialist Roderick Zinco now funding the project under orders from Rasputin's spirit. Kroenen and Kurtz began work on constructing an "apocalypse army" of six hundred and sixty-six reanimated soldiers. During this time, Zinco reunited Kroenen with von Klempt's head, which Kroenen was able to resuscitate. Von Klempt was not under the sway of Rasputin, however, and tried to convince Kroenen to join him instead; the zealous Kurtz attacked von Klempt, and in the struggle Kroenen killed Kurtz. The enraged spirit of Rasputin appeared, cursing Zinco for his hand in the project's failure and striking him blind; the unseeing Zinco fumbled into a self-destruct switch, unleashing a massive explosion. Kroenen, along with all present, were presumed destroyed by the blast.

Despite appearances, Kroenen survived and resurfaced years later with Leopold Kurtz to assist Isiah Marsten in acquiring a vessel from the Bureau for Paranormal Research and Defense. Kroenen assumed the body was intended for Rasputin before learning that Marsten tricked him into resurrecting the Black Flame, escaping the resulting chaos with von Klempt's head. Kroenen was found sometime later by Varvara, who reawakened von Klempt and invited the two men to join her cause in rebuilding Pandemonium on Earth. Kroenen became increasingly skeptical of Varvara, who eventually incinerated him.

== In other media ==
=== Hellboy (2004) ===
Karl Ruprecht Kroenen as seen in the first Hellboy film

Czech actor Ladislav Beran portrayed Karl Ruprecht Kroenen (Note: Note that the spelling of his middle name was changed from "Ruprect" to "Ruprecht".) in the 2004 Hellboy film adaptation. This depiction is radically altered from the comics – though Kroenen is still a masked Nazi disciple of Rasputin, he is reimagined as a mute clockwork cyborg assassin. Comic creator Mike Mignola remarked that "it was fascinating to see a character of mine turned into something I never imagined—it was great."

Writer-director Guillermo del Toro created a significantly expanded biography for this iteration of Kroenen. Born in Munich in 1897, Kroenen demonstrated great skill with fencing and clockwork mechanics. A drive for purity and perfectionism combined with a self-flagellating masochistic compulsion led Kroenen to perform self-surgery to "enhance" his appearance, to the point of removing his own eyelids and lips: as a result, he wore a tight-fitting mask that also filtered out germs. Kroenen met and devoted himself to Rasputin in 1930. As a member of the Nazi Party, he joined the Schutzstaffel in 1933 and served as commandant of Auschwitz concentration camp.

Kroenen is introduced during the events of the film's prologue, in 1944. Allied troops converge on a Nazi ritual, identifying Kroenen as Hitler's top assassin and head of the Thule Society. Kroenen assists Rasputin in conducting the techno-magical ritual to open a portal to summon the Ogdru Jahad, but as the hell-hole opens, the American soldiers storm the encampment. Kroenen, wielding special blades attached to his forearms, dispatches many of the soldiers with ease and even shrugs off bullet wounds. He is only stopped when trying to remove a grenade from the portal device – the machinery damages his hand, and the explosion drives large metal shrapnel through his body. Disappearing shortly thereafter, a gravesite discovered years later served to fake his death.

Kroenen reappeared in 2004, alongside the revived Rasputin. Kroenen had been "repaired" with a prosthetic mechanical hand and a clockwork heart (operated by a wind-up key implanted in his chest, his speed and reflexes could be improved by rotating it), while his blood had been replaced by a dust. In this state, he retained his intelligence and skills but was virtually immortal – invulnerable to gunshot wounds, and able to enter a "switched-off" dormant state to be reanimated again and again. He used this technique to appear dead, baiting Bureau for Paranormal Research and Defense agents to taking him inside their headquarters for study. Once inside, Kroenen drew Rasputin there and personally killed Trevor Bruttenholm before escaping with his leader. Hellboy eventually avenges his adoptive father Bruttenholm's death by throwing Kroenen into a spiked pit and crushing him with a giant cog.

==== Hellboy II: The Golden Army (2008) ====
Kroenen's smashed mask appears in a display case at the BPRD in Hellboy II: The Golden Army. In the commentary, del Toro indicated plans for Kroenen to have a history with Johann Krauss; this is demonstrated by a scene of Johann staring in deep thought at Kroenen's mask.

An animated version of an unfilmed epilogue to The Golden Army, loosely adapting the introduction to Hellboy: Wake the Devil, was included in the DVD's special features. In it, Kroenen's unmasked body is retrieved from the pit by Roderick Zinco. Zinco eventually brings Kroenen's head, now severed and in an alchemical tank, to a long-abandoned Nazi fortress in the Arctic. When his head is connected into a massive robotic machine, Kroenen (voiced by Adam Fulton) reawakens and address his "Master" – a resurrected Rasputin.

=== Hellboy (2019) ===
Professor Doctor Karl Ruprecht Kroenen appears in the 2019 Hellboy reboot, portrayed by Ilko Iliev. This minor appearance hews much more closely to the comic iteration, with Kroenen portrayed simply as a masked SS officer present at the Project Ragna Rok ritual. When the ceremony is raided by Allied forces led by the Lobster, Kroenen flees the scene. His ultimate fate is left unknown.

== Critical response ==
Kroenen is a popular Hellboy villain, who appears on a variety of merchandise. His larger appearance in the 2004 film spawned various merchandise as well.

German film historian Florian Evers devotes a whole chapter of his book on National Socialism in modern pop culture to the character of Karl Ruprecht Kroenen. He points out the allegoric puzzle segments of Shoah-iconography behind the design of Kroenen, calling him an incarnation of the Holocaust.
