= Hellboy II: The Golden Army =

2008 film by Guillermo del Toro

- Theatrical release poster
- Directed by: Guillermo del Toro
- Screenplay by: Guillermo del Toro
- Story by: Guillermo del Toro; Mike Mignola
- Based on: Hellboy by Mike Mignola
- Produced by: Lawrence Gordon; Mike Richardson; Lloyd Levin
- Starring: Ron Perlman; Selma Blair; Doug Jones; Jeffrey Tambor; John Hurt
- Cinematography: Guillermo Navarro
- Edited by: Bernat Vilaplana
- Music by: Danny Elfman
- Production companies: Universal Pictures; Relativity Media; Lawrence Gordon/Lloyd Levin Productions; Dark Horse Entertainment
- Distributed by: Universal Pictures
- Release date: July 11, 2008
- Running time: 120 minutes
- Country: United States
- Language: English
- Budget: $82.5–85 million
- Box office: $168.3 million

Hellboy II: The Golden Army is a 2008 American superhero film based on the Dark Horse Comics character, created by Mike Mignola. It is a sequel to Hellboy (2004) and is the second live-action film in the franchise. It was written and directed by Guillermo del Toro from a story he co-wrote with Mignola. Ron Perlman stars as Hellboy, alongside Selma Blair, Doug Jones, Jeffrey Tambor, and John Hurt. In the film, Hellboy and the Bureau of Paranormal Research and Defense must battle a mythical prince who plans to reclaim the world for his magical kindred.

Hellboy II: The Golden Army was released in the United States on July 11, 2008, to generally positive reviews from critics, with praise towards its fantasy atmosphere as well as Perlman and the other cast's acting performances. It grossed $168.3 million against a production budget of $82.5–85 million. The film received a nomination for Best Makeup at the 81st Academy Awards.

The franchise was rebooted in 2019, with a new film simply titled Hellboy, and was released by Lionsgate. Following the critical and commercial failure of the film, a second reboot was announced in 2023, titled Hellboy: The Crooked Man which itself was a critical and commercial disappointment.

== Plot ==
During Christmas 1955, a young Hellboy is told a bedtime story by his adoptive father, Trevor Bruttenholm, set during an ancient war between humans and magical creatures. The goblin blacksmith offers Balor, king of the elves, to build him an indestructible mechanical army. Encouraged by his son, Prince Nuada Silverlance, Balor accepts, but when the Golden Army subsequently devastates humanity, Balor regrets his actions and forms a truce with the humans. Angered by this decision, Nuada leaves the elf kingdom in exile, while the crown to command the Golden Army, which can only be worn by one of royal blood, is split into three pieces.

In the present day, (Note: A year after the events depicted in Hellboy) Nuada begins gathering the pieces of the crown. He retrieves the first piece, on sale at an auction, by unleashing tooth fairies that eat the crowd. He then kills his father and collects the second piece, prompting his twin sister Princess Nuala to escape with the final piece. Meanwhile, at the Bureau for Paranormal Research and Defense (B.P.R.D.), demonic special agent Hellboy is having issues with his girlfriend Liz and dislikes that their organization must operate in secrecy. Investigating the auction slaughter, Hellboy allows himself to be revealed to the world. In the commotion, Abe Sapien discovers Liz is pregnant but she swears him to secrecy.

Furious at Hellboy's actions, Tom Manning's superiors bring in the ectoplasmic medium Johann Krauss to rein him in. With Krauss in charge, the team tracks the tooth fairies to a secret troll market under the Brooklyn Bridge. Abe finds Nuala, who has obtained a map leading to the Golden Army, and falls in love with her. Hellboy fights and kills Nuada's accomplice Wink and an elemental forest god that Nuada summons against him. During the fight, Nuada questions why he fights for the humans when they have driven the magical creatures, including him, into hiding.

Nuala is taken under the B.P.R.D.'s protection, but Nuada tracks her to the headquarters using their magical bond, which also causes them to share wounds and read each other's thoughts. Nuala hides the final crown piece while Hellboy battles Nuada, who critically wounds him with his spear before abducting Nuala, promising her return in exchange for the crown piece. Unable to remove the spear shard in his wound, Liz and Abe decide to take Hellboy to the Golden Army's location in the Giant's Causeway of Northern Ireland, where they encounter the Bethmoora goblin master blacksmith, who brings them before the Angel of Death to retrieve the spear shard. Though warned that Hellboy will doom humanity if he lives and that she will suffer the most from it, Liz pleads for Hellboy's life. The Angel removes the shard from Hellboy's chest and tells Liz to give him a reason to live. She reveals to Hellboy that he will be a father and he recovers.

The goblin leads the team to the resting place of the Golden Army, where Nuada awaits them. Abe gives him the last piece of the crown and Nuada awakens the Golden Army. Hellboy challenges Nuada for the right to command the army; as Hellboy is a member of Hell's royal family, Nuada must accept the challenge. Hellboy defeats Nuada and spares his life, but Nuala commits suicide to stop her brother once and for all; the dying Nuada tells Hellboy he will have to choose whether humanity or magical beings must die. Abe psychically shares his feelings with Nuala before she dies. Liz uses her pyrokinesis to melt the crown, deactivating the Golden Army for good. Hellboy, Liz, Abe, and Johann resign from the B.P.R.D. and Hellboy contemplates his future life with Liz and their baby, to which Liz indicates they will have twins.

== Cast ==
Foreground, from left to right: Johann Krauss, Abe Sapien, Hellboy, and Liz Sherman; Background: Prince Nuada, Princess Nuala

- Ron Perlman as Hellboy: An immensely powerful demon who works for the government organization Bureau for Paranormal Research and Defense (B.P.R.D.). Guillermo del Toro described the character's dilemma in the sequel, "[He] has always fought on the side of humans, but this [fantasy of destruction] pushes his buttons to reconsider." In the sequel, Hellboy is armed with an enormous new gun called "The Big Baby", which fires flare-like bullets. Montse Ribé plays a young version of Hellboy in an opening flashback.
- Selma Blair as Liz Sherman: A pyrokinetic member of B.P.R.D. and Hellboy's girlfriend. Blair described her character as more engaging in the sequel, "In the first one she was afraid to take a step. She was completely a zombie, not wanting to own up to her power and having the memory of what she'd created in her life... I was really eager to come and play Liz with a little more vibrancy." Blair also had short hair for her role, avoiding long hair from her portrayal in the first film, which she felt "brought her face down". The actress emphasized Liz Sherman's growth in the sequel, "She's looking to the future much more, and things are happening in this one that she has to buck up... I think you're dealing with a lot knowing this young girl that we last saw as very damaged, and now she's with this guy, and all these people around her, I think, we've really had to step up a strength, and a confidence in her so that I don't look like the little baby kid sister tagging along."
- Doug Jones as three characters:
  - Abe Sapien: An ichthyo sapien psychic who works for B.P.R.D. with Hellboy. Jones said of his return to the role after the first film, "He's been an absolute treat for me to play this time. He's written with so many different colours and levels and there's a love interest... And his buddy time with Hellboy is more concrete and his brother/sister time with Liz is even better." Jones believed that Abe Sapien became "the brains, the intellect of the team" while Hellboy protects his character because he is still "kind of innocent". The actor pointed to his character's adolescence with love, "His love life is something that's never been tapped into before... So just like a 13-year-old with his first crush, this is how you're going to see Abe this time. A portion of him. Will this affect his decision-making powers?" Unlike the first movie, where Abe's voice was dubbed by David Hyde Pierce, Doug Jones provided the voice himself.
  - Angel of Death: A female angel with androgynous characteristics. Jones explained his portrayal, "The script refers to the angel as a her and that's what I do. I think she has feminine qualities, but she's not totally a woman either. And that's okay. I like characters that keep you guessing."
  - Chamberlain: The door keeper for King Balor. The creature is long, gangly, eight feet tall and wears silk and velvet robes. It also has long, spindly fingers, which filmmakers mobilized with servos and which Jones wore as extensions of his own hands.
- John Alexander and James Dodd as Johann Krauss: Krauss is a German psychic whose ectoplasmic being is contained in a suit after a botched séance. Originally, filmmakers planned to create a computer-generated version of the glass fishbowl helmet, but with the cost being prohibitive, they created an actual helmet. To ensure the invisibility of the actor's head under the glass, perspective and mirror tricks were used. The helmet was controlled by two puppeteers, so the heavy contraption had to be shared between Alexander and Dodd.
  - Seth MacFarlane voices Johann Krauss, having taken over from Thomas Kretschmann, after del Toro decided that Kretschmann's voice and the mechanical sound effects to Johann's suit did not mesh well.
  - John Alexander also performs and voices the Bethmoora Goblin, a legless goblin who helps Hellboy and the team find the Angel of Death. He is the master goblin blacksmith who forged the Golden Army and lost his original legs in the process.
- Luke Goss as Prince Nuada Silverlance: King Balor's son and a martial arts expert of extraordinary proficiency. Goss was previously cast as mutant vampire Jared Nomak in del Toro's 2002 film Blade II, and the director approached the actor to be cast in Hellboy II. The only other actor considered for the part was Charlie Hunnam. Goss trained with action director and former Jackie Chan Stunt Team member, Brad Allan, learning sword and spear skills for six to seven months for his role. He and Anna Walton also learned ancient Gaelic from a dialog coach for their lines. Goss did not perceive Nuada as evil, explaining, "It's issues, his people, he's part of what he truly believes. I don't think, really, he's so deluded... [He] is driven by an ethic that was instilled by the person he has problems [with; that is,] his father, and inevitably, that leads into the conflict with him and Hellboy." Goss also noted that his character admired and revered his twin sister, portrayed by Anna Walton. He said of the prince and the princess, "There is an incestuous relationship that's not maybe overly obvious to everybody, but some people hopefully will pick up on the fact, certainly from my direction towards her."
- Anna Walton as Princess Nuala: King Balor's daughter and Nuada's twin sister. She is described as "very light" while Nuada is "very dark", creating a yin and yang dynamic. Walton elaborated on the incestuous tones between her character and Prince Nuada, "He's the dark side and she's the light side and they're pulled apart and pulled back together again, and she's trying to get away because she knows there is something she has to do. He can't let that go and they can't really do anything without each other so it's a really interesting thing." Her character also forms a relationship with Abe Sapien, and Walton noted their similarities, "They are both slightly lost souls and they understand each other." Walton spoke of her character's sense of purpose, "She feels very strongly about what she has to do in the film, and then her absolute connection and love for the Earth and what we are given. That's what she's here to protect... Her relationship with her brother, and how he is almost a part of her but she has to break away and will do whatever it takes to stop him from achieving what he wants to achieve, which is the mass destruction of mankind."
- Jeffrey Tambor as Tom Manning: Head of the B.P.R.D., he has a slightly antagonistic relationship with Hellboy.
- John Hurt as Trevor Bruttenholm: Hellboy's adoptive father, he is seen in the beginning of the film telling young Hellboy the story of the Golden Army.
- Brian Steele as four of the trolls:
  - Mr. Wink: A giant cave troll who was originally conceived by Guillermo del Toro. Wink was sculpted by Mario Torres, and the costume was worn by Brian Steele. In the film, Wink's right arm has a giant metal fist. The fist was designed by filmmakers to be made of heavy plastic to stay light enough for motors to operate the mechanical fingers. The fist could also be physically detached and used as a projectile without any computer-generated imagery used. Several of Mike Mignola's comics characters wield similar mechanical fists on chains, including the Kriegaffes used by Herman von Klempt. Likewise, Mr. Wink has an old wound on the left side of his face that has closed one of his eyes. Del Toro said that he named Mr. Wink after Selma Blair's one-eyed dog (which Blair confirms in a commentary track for the DVD release).
  - Cathedral Head: A troll who is the owner of a map shop who gives Princess Nuala the hidden map.
  - Fragglewump: A monstrous Scottish troll that masquerades as a sweet old lady and feeds on kittens and fears canaries.
  - Cronie Troll: A spice shop owner who gets in an argument with Hellboy in the troll market
- Roy Dotrice as King Balor: The one-armed king of Elfland. All of his dialogue is in Gaelic.

== Production ==
In May 2004, following the release of Guillermo del Toro's Hellboy the previous month, a sequel was announced by Revolution Studios with del Toro returning to direct and Ron Perlman reprising his lead role as the title character. The director sought to create a film trilogy with the first sequel anticipated for release in 2006. Revolution Studios planned to produce the film and distribute it through a deal with Columbia Pictures, but by 2006, their distribution deal was not renewed and Revolution began refocusing on exploiting their film library. In August 2006, Universal Pictures acquired the project with the intent to finance and distribute the sequel, which was newly scheduled to be released in summer of 2008. Production was scheduled to begin in April 2007 in Etyek, Hungary (near Budapest) and London, England.

Director Guillermo del Toro explored several concepts for the sequel, initially planning to recreate the classic versions of Frankenstein, Dracula and the Wolf Man. He and comic book creator Mike Mignola also spent a few days adapting the Almost Colossus story, featuring Roger the Homunculus. They then found it easier to create an original story based on folklore, because del Toro was planning Pan's Labyrinth, and Mignola's comics were becoming increasingly based on mythology. Later, del Toro pitched a premise to Revolution Studios that involved four Titans from the four corners of Earth—Wind, Water, Fire, and Earth—before he replaced the Titans with a Golden Army. Mignola described the theme of the sequel, "The focus is more on the folklore and fairy tale aspect of Hellboy. It's not Nazis, machines and mad scientists but the old gods and characters who have been kind of shoved out of our world."

Del Toro released Pan's Labyrinth in 2006, and the film earned multiple Academy Awards, providing the director enough clout to begin production on the film. Guillermo del Toro began filming the film in June 2007 in Budapest and concluded in December 2007. The film was the first American production to shoot at Korda Studios in Hungary, then newly built outside Budapest. The creature shop was led by the company Spectral Motion, and Filmefex contributed work in makeup and prosthetics. The latter company designed a creature for the troll market scene and built several statues and full-size replicas of the Golden Army.

== Music ==
- Eddy Arnold – "Santa Claus Is Coming to Town"
- Takako Nishizaki and Jenő Jandó – "Violin Sonata No. 9"
- Travis – "All I Want to Do Is Rock"
- Poet in Process – "Why"
- Brenga Astur – "Nel Caleyu La Fonte"
- Eels – "Beautiful Freak"
- Barry Manilow – "Can't Smile Without You"
- Red Is for Fire – "Noir"

== Release ==
Hellboy II: The Golden Army opened on July 11, 2008, in 3,204 theaters in the United States and Canada. The film ranked first at the box office, grossing an estimated $35.9 million over the weekend, outperforming the opening of its predecessor, which had opened with $23.2 million. The opening was the biggest of Guillermo del Toro's directing career until 2013, when it was surpassed by Pacific Rim.

Audiences polled by CinemaScore, during the opening weekend, gave the film a 'B' grade. The demographic for the film was mostly male, and the age distribution for moviegoers below and above 25 years old was evenly split. Outside of the United States and Canada, the film had a limited release on 533 screens in Mexico, Thailand, Malaysia, and Singapore, grossing $4.6 million.

In its second weekend in the United States and Canada, the film's box office performance dropped 71% to gross $10.1 million, a larger drop than its predecessor, which dropped 53% in comparison. The sequel's larger drop was attributed to the significant opening of the Batman film The Dark Knight. As of September 9, 2008 the film has grossed $75,986,503 in the United States and Canada. The film came top in the UK and Ireland box office charts upon its release on August 22 and earned an additional international gross of $84,401,560 bringing its worldwide total to $160,388,063.

=== Marketing ===
In addition to television spots showing scenes from the film, humorous adverts were also aired depicting Hellboy appearing on Ghost Hunters; being interviewed by James Lipton on Inside the Actors Studio; playing video games with Chuck Bartowski from Chuck; visiting the set of American Gladiators; auditioning for a high school event; and hosting a public service announcement with a cat.

=== Home media ===
Hellboy II: The Golden Army was released on DVD and Blu-ray on November 11, 2008. For the DVD, there is both a single-disc and a 3-disc special edition (not available in the UK).

The single-disc edition includes the movie and a very limited selection of special features. Available on the one-disc edition is a "Director's Notebook" section, in which pages of Del Toro's notebook are reproduced, showcasing design sketches and annotations by the director, as well as "video pod" segments in which he explains these designs and concepts further. The segment is available in the three-disc edition in the "pre-production vault", which also includes other galleries. The three-disc special edition includes two audio commentaries (one by Del Toro and another by members of the cast), six deleted scenes, several featurettes, a full-length documentary, and image galleries. Though not added into the movie after credits due to budget cuts, a comic style of the Zinco Sequel is added to the special features, serving as a prologue to the third Hellboy movie. The third disc contains a digital copy. Hellboy II: The Golden Army was released on 4K UHD Blu-Ray on May 7, 2019.

== Reception ==
=== Critical response ===
Rotten Tomatoes reported that 86% of critics gave the film positive reviews, with an average rating of 7.2/10, based on 249 reviews. The website's critical consensus reads, "Guillermo del Toro crafts a stellar comic book sequel, boasting visuals that are as imaginative as the characters are endearing." On Metacritic the film has a weighted average score of 78 out of 100, based on 36 reviews, indicating "generally favorable" reviews.

Roger Ebert of the Chicago Sun-Times gave the film three and a half stars out of four, the same rating he gave the first film, writing: "In every way the equal of del Toro's original Hellboy, although perhaps a little noisier, it's another celebration of his love for bizarre fantasy and diabolical machines." Michael Rechtshaffen writing in The Hollywood Reporter said Hellboy II was an uncompromised vision of del Toro's imagination. He said that with the director given free rein, the film came across as an amalgam of the best moments from his previous films, only with better visual effects. John Anderson of Variety wrote of a rococo precision to the visuals that exceeded that of the first film. He cited del Toro's "clockmaker's preoccupation with detail" and ability to blend state-of-the-art technology with more classical visuals as the reasons for the film's success. Owen Gleiberman of Entertainment Weekly said that the plot did not often deviate from its comic-book traditions, but that del Toro staged the action "brilliantly". He said that while the visual effects deserved recognition, what made the film so exciting was the personality they were imbued with. Chuck Wilson of The Village Voice said that del Toro was on autopilot, but that he and his Pan's Labyrinth crew, cinematographer Guillermo Navarro in particular, staged the steady stream of action set-pieces expertly. Mike Goodridge of Screen International wrote that del Toro had retained the B movie tone of the first film, saying the film managed to avoid the self-importance of The Incredible Hulk and the Batman film series and that del Toro was simply a "great storyteller" providing a "good time". Stuart Levine in Premiere praised the visuals and "beautiful" set-pieces, but said del Toro's script fell a little short of his direction. Writing for MSNBC.com, Alonso Duralde declared that it represented a backwards step for del Toro, saying that despite several creepy sequences, the film was a return to the muddled storytelling and pretty visuals of his pre-Pan's Labyrinth films. He said del Toro's screenplay lacked energy or momentum. However, Peter Bradshaw, of The Guardian, said almost the opposite was the case, as he thinks "it is a crackingly enjoyable and exciting sequel, with something that the memory of Pan's Labyrinth might have entirely erased: a sense of humour." Noting that "this spectacular movie seethes and fizzes with wit and energy, absorbing and transforming influences such as Ghostbusters and even Harry Potter and the secret world of Diagon Alley."

John Anderson said the film would be "almost unthinkable" without Ron Perlman in the lead role, saying the film was more successful than its predecessor mainly due to the more deliberately amusing tone and the "drily ironic" title character. He said the only weak link was Luke Goss's "unimposing" villain. While praising the general banter between Perlman and Blair, Stuart Levine said the nonchalant Hellboy exhibited insufficient growth as a character, and that Jeffrey Tambor was largely wasted in his role. He agreed that Goss's villain was weak as written, with no tangible menace. Helen O'Hara of Empire said the character was only let down by a lack of screentime in which to give him enough dramatic weight, and that Goss did "a perfectly good job". Owen Gleiberman said Perlman was more assured than in the first Hellboy, funnier and more cantankerous. He said the entire ensemble had "an appealing, outsize grandeur" about it. Mike Goodridge said the film carefully developed the character relationships, and Chuck Wilson said that other than the title character's penchant for chewing cigars, he was otherwise "uninteresting". Alonso Duralde wrote that the "sitcom-ish" character dilemmas were uninteresting, saying that Perlman and Tambor's performances were regularly let down by the script. He said that Blair's performance was possibly the first bad one he'd seen by the actress, and that while Jones was "brilliant" physically, his vocal performance was inferior to David Hyde Pierce's in the first Hellboy film. Michael Rechtshaffen called Perlman "terrific" and said Blair's brooding portrayal was effective.

Michael Rechtshaffen concluded that Hellboy II was less focused than the first film, but that it played "faster and looser" and mostly a "wild ride". In a positive review, John Anderson's main criticism was a sequence set in Northern Ireland, which he called the least interesting and most conventional segment of the film. Chuck Wilson said the film "didn't have much on its mind", but that it would amaze children and amuse adults, Stuart Levine said the film was worth viewers' time, and Alonso Duralde said Hellboy II was "limp and unengaging". Owen Gleiberman surmised that the film was "derivative yet... dazzling", and Mike Goodridge concluded by praising the filmmakers' skill at creating a film that, despite featuring "stunning" action sequences and creature effects, still found time for character development and a fulfilling story that expanded the franchise's wider mythology. Peter Bradshaw suggested that "'Visionary' is a word too easily applied to fantasy movies, but it sticks easily here."

The film appeared on some critics' top ten lists of the best films of 2008. Rene Rodriguez of the Miami Herald named it the fifth-best film of 2008 (along with The Dark Knight), and Stephanie Zacharek of Salon named it the tenth-best film of 2008 (along with Iron Man).

=== Awards ===
Award	Category	Winner/Nominee	Result
Academy Awards	Best Makeup	Mike Elizalde, Thomas Floutz	Nominated
Empire Awards	Best Sci-Fi/Superhero		Nominated
Saturn Awards	Best Horror Film		Won
Saturn Awards	Best Make-up	Mike Elizalde, Thom Floutz	Nominated
Saturn Awards	Best Special Effects	Michael J. Wassel, Adrian De Wet, Andrew Chapman, Eamonn Butler	Nominated
Screen Actors Guild Awards	Outstanding Performance by a Stunt Ensemble in a Motion Picture	Bradley James Allan, Mark Chapman, Bonnie Morgan, Andrew Owen, Michael Weis, Peng Zhang	Nominated
Fangoria Chainsaw Awards	Best Supporting Actor	Doug Jones	Won
Fangoria Chainsaw Awards	Best Actor	Ron Perlman	Won
Fangoria Chainsaw Awards	Best Make-Up/ Creature FX	Mike Elizalde/ David Martí/ Montse Ribé/ Cliff Wallace	Won
Fangoria Chainsaw Awards	Best Wide-Release Film	Universal Pictures	Won
Fangoria Chainsaw Awards	Best Screenplay	Guillermo del Toro	Nominated
Fangoria Chainsaw Awards	Best Supporting Actress	Anna Walton	Nominated
Visual Effects Society Awards	Outstanding Visual Effects in a Visual Effects-Driven Feature Motion Picture	Michael J. Wassel, Lucy Killick, Adrian de Wet, Eamonn Butler	Nominated
Visual Effects Society Awards	Outstanding Animated Character in a Live Action Feature Motion Picture	Colin McEvoy, Christoph Ammann for "Elemental Sequence"	Nominated

== Tie-in publications and merchandise ==
=== Short story ===
Guillermo del Toro and Matthew Robbins co-authored the short story, "Tasty Teeth", which was published in the 2004 anthology Hellboy: Odder Jobs by Dark Horse Comics. In the story, Hellboy encounters tooth fairies in a tomb in Romania, featuring elements that were later incorporated into the auction house sequence in the film.

=== Promotional comic ===
This story by Mike Mignola and Guillermo del Toro with art by Francisco Ruiz Velasco was published as a special promotion for the film by Dark Horse Comics in one-shot comic book Hellboy: The Golden Army (January 2008) with three variant covers:

1. Photo cover of Ron Perlman as Hellboy
2. Photo cover of Doug Jones as Abe Sapien
3. Photo cover of Selma Blair as Liz Sherman

In his introduction film director del Toro affirms his and Mignola's admiration of Velasco's "clean, propulsive narrative, draftsmanship, and artistic skills" and states that the intention of this title is to treat the film's opening narrative as a mini-epic and give the artist the opportunity to tell it with unlimited budget and shooting time.

In the story Professor Trevor Bruttenholm, caring for the young Hellboy at Douglas Air Force Base, New Mexico, on Christmas Eve 1944, relates the story of the Golden Army from the film's opening prologue, which he describes as the first tale ever told, as a bedtime story that he ends by saying one day Hellboy may find out if it is true.

=== Art book ===
Hellboy II: The Art of the Movie (June 18, 2008, ISBN 978-1-59307-964-2) by Guillermo del Toro and Mike Mignola with art by Sergio Sandoval and Francisco Ruiz Velasco looks into the film's evolution, from early concept art and diary sketches to photos of the final props, sets, and includes:

- Complete screenplay including a deleted scene illustrated with the original storyboards
- Interviews and commentary from creator Mike Mignola and filmmaker Guillermo del Toro

=== Novelization ===
Hellboy II: The Golden Army (June 18, 2008, ISBN 978-1-59307-954-3) by Robert Greenberger is the official novelization of the film. It won a Scribe Award for best adapted novel in 2009.

=== Video game ===
During its initial theatrical release in North America, a video game set within the Hellboy universe was released around the time that of the film entitled Hellboy: The Science of Evil for PlayStation 3, PlayStation Portable and Xbox 360, released on June 24 in North America and August 15 in Europe. Despite its close release date, promotion alongside the film and featuring voices of the same actors, the game is not a direct movie tie-in with the plot not being related to that of the film but instead follows an original story where Hellboy investigates Nazi operations in Romania under Herman von Klempt, an antagonist from the comics.

=== Zinco epilogue ===
Included as a special feature on the DVD is an animated comic that foreshadows the events of the next film. In the Zinco Epilogue, a group of men go into Rasputin's tomb and find Kroenen's body. After bringing Kroenen to a doctor along with instructions to revive him with an alchemical manual, Zinco and his party travel to an arctic cave with Zinco as the only survivor. Upon entering the cavern, Zinco opens a container he has with him containing the preserved head of Kroenen and attaches it to a giant robot. As soon as it is attached, the cyborg awakens and the spirit of Rasputin appears, stating that he has one more job for him.

== Post release ==
=== Cancelled sequel and spin-offs ===
Guillermo del Toro had envisioned a potential third installment in the Hellboy film series as early as 2006, when II was still in pre-production; the idea was not to end the second film on a cliffhanger, but rather to raise a minor plot point in its conclusion that a third entry could then expand upon. In the leadup to The Golden Army's release, del Toro continued to express interest in a sequel: "I think we would all come back to do a third Hellboy [...] I certainly know where we're going with the movie on the third one" – albeit indicating that his responsibilities with adapting The Hobbit were his immediate priority (del Toro would exit the Hobbit project in 2010).

In June 2010, del Toro speculated that Hellboy 3 could happen, but emphasized it would not be his next film as a screenplay had yet to be written. Del Toro and Ron Perlman appeared at the 2012 San Diego Comic-Con to promote Pacific Rim; having been inspired by a recent Make-A-Wish function in which Perlman appeared in full Hellboy makeup for a terminally ill boy, del Toro announced that the duo were "going to make an effort" to make Hellboy 3, despite not having communicated with Mignola or connected with a studio.

On April 5, 2013, in an interview with Comic Book Resources, Hellboy creator Mike Mignola remarked that a third Hellboy film was unlikely to emerge, joking that he found himself "explaining endlessly ... that there's no Hellboy 3 movie". Mignola also vetoed the idea of telling the story of Hellboy 3 in comic book form, out of a desire to keep the comic and film versions of Hellboy separate.

The budget and scale of a potential threequel was often mentioned as an obstacle to its production. Del Toro indicated that the movie would need "about $150 million" – nearly double the $85 million budget of The Golden Army – to render its apocalyptic scale of Hellboy becoming the beast of the Apocalypse. Perlman similarly opined that "[Hellboy 3] needs to be twice as big as Hellboy 1 or Hellboy 2." Del Toro reiterated these issues in a 2014 Reddit AMA, admitting that "we don't have that movie on the horizon." He explained that the first two Hellboy movies underperformed in theaters but made more money on home video rentals and sales, and that as that profit stream was declining with the rise of streaming studios had become wary of financing a project like Hellboy 3.

Attempts were made to produce Hellboy 3 for Legendary Pictures, particularly in the wake of del Toro's production of Pacific Rim with the company. Legendary founder and then-CEO/chairman Thomas Tull had expressed a desire to "see Hellboy 3" in 2013, leading del Toro to reach out him to resolve the series. The production company indicated potential for funding Hellboy 3 if the sequel to Pacific Rim (initially planned to be written and directed by del Toro) performed well at the box office; though as del Toro was replaced in both directorial and writing roles while Pacific Rim Uprising was still in pre-production, this deal presumably fell through.

In February 2017, del Toro announced via Twitter that, after meeting with all parties, Hellboy 3 "100% [...] will not happen", emphasizing that this would be his final word on the project.

Perlman remained enthusiastic about and committed to the project over the years, even after del Toro's final statement and the release of the reboot, going as far as turning down an appearance in a Hellboy project that would not involve del Toro. In 2024, twenty years after the first Hellboy movie, Perlman admitted that he'd "finally gotten to the point where I realize [Hellboy 3] is just never going to happen."

==== Hellboy: Silverlance spinoff ====
In 2010, Hellboy screenwriter Peter Briggs was asked by Universal to script a spin-off centering on Prince Nuada, and provisionally agreed that Briggs could direct the film in New Zealand. Briggs began work on an outline with co-writer Aaron Mason. Titled Hellboy: Silverlance, the script was a B.P.R.D. story featuring Abe Sapien as the main character with Hellboy in a supporting role. Moving into the new B.P.R.D. headquarters in Colorado, Abe is troubled by his psychic connection with Princess Nuala, and begins researching the elves' history. The film would have shown Nuada's adventures throughout history, including his rivalry with a fairy courtier who orchestrates Nuada's exile in hopes of marrying Nuala and seizing control of the fairy kingdom; Nuada first meeting Mister Wink by saving him from a troupe of soldiers during the Spanish Inquisition; and Nuada in Nazi Germany, engineering a pact to keep various supernatural entities safe during World War II (with Nuada and Kroenen fighting in a "friendly" match for Project Ragnarok men). Doug Jones would have played both Abe and the Angel of Death, who strikes a bargain with Nuada. Rupert Evans's Agent Myers would also have returned. The story climaxed at the new B.P.R.D. headquarters, with the return of Rasputin's summoning gauntlet. Universal wanted to proceed with the project, but it emerged that del Toro's Hellboy 3 was still a possibility, so Silverlance was shelved.

In 2015, Briggs received another call from Universal, saying that Hellboy 3 had been cancelled and asking him and Mason to return for a reworked Silverlance, with producer Lawrence Gordon involved. The caveat was that Hellboy could not appear, but the writers managed to get the character a cameo appearance at the climax. If successful, the film would have launched a From the Files of the B.P.R.D. spin-off series.

In May 2017, Briggs affirmed that, with the announcement of the Hellboy reboot, the Silverlance project was dead.

=== Reboots ===
About 2014, Mignola, writer Andrew Cosby, and the producers began work on the story for a new film. The project was initially intended as a sequel to del Toro's films, but Perlman was unwilling to star without del Toro involved. When Neil Marshall joined, it was decided that the new film would be a reboot.

On May 8, 2017, it was announced that Millennium Films was in negotiations with producers Larry Gordon and Lloyd Levin for a film with the working title Hellboy: Rise of the Blood Queen, with Marshall in talks to direct and Stranger Things star David Harbour expected to play Hellboy. Hellboy creator Mike Mignola co-wrote the script with Cosby and Christopher Golden. On August 8, 2017, Lionsgate confirmed that the project would finally only be known as Hellboy. The film was released on April 12, 2019, to negative reviews and performed poorly at the box office.

In February 2023, Millennium Media announced plans for a new live-action reboot titled Hellboy: The Crooked Man, the first in a planned series of films. Brian Taylor directed from a script by Mignola and Golden, based on the 2008 comic of the same name. The film was co-produced between Nu Boyana and Campbell Grobman Film and is presented by Millennium Media in association with Dark Horse Entertainment. The film was released direct-to-VOD in the United States on October 8, 2024.

== Bibliography ==
- Greenberger, Robert (June 15, 2008). Hellboy II: The Golden Army (Paperback). Novelization of the film. Dark Horse. ISBN 978-1-59307-954-3.
- Del Toro, Guillermo; Mignola, Mike; Sandoval, Sergio; Velasco, Francisco Ruis (June 6, 2008). Hellboy II: The Art of the Movie (Paperback). Dark Horse. ISBN 978-1-59307-964-2.
- Del Toro, Guillermo; Mignola, Mike; Sandoval, Sergio; Velasco, Francisco Ruis (December 29, 2008). The Monsters of Hellboy II (Paperback). Dark Horse. ISBN 978-1-59307-965-9.
