= Hellboy (2004 film) =

2004 film by Guillermo del Toro

- Theatrical release poster
- Directed by: Guillermo del Toro
- Screenplay by: Guillermo del Toro
- Story by: Guillermo del Toro; Peter Briggs
- Based on: Hellboy by Mike Mignola
- Produced by: Lawrence Gordon; Mike Richardson; Lloyd Levin
- Starring: Ron Perlman; Selma Blair; Jeffrey Tambor; Karel Roden; Rupert Evans; John Hurt
- Cinematography: Guillermo Navarro
- Edited by: Peter Amundson
- Music by: Marco Beltrami
- Production companies: Revolution Studios; Lawrence Gordon/Lloyd Levin Productions; Dark Horse Entertainment
- Distributed by: Columbia Pictures (through Sony Pictures Releasing)
- Release dates: March 30, 2004 (Mann Village Theater); April 2, 2004 (United States)
- Running time: 122 minutes
- Country: United States
- Language: English
- Budget: $60–66 million
- Box office: $99.8 million

Hellboy is a 2004 American superhero film based on the Dark Horse Comics character, created by Mike Mignola. Written and directed by Guillermo del Toro, it is the first live-action film in the Hellboy franchise. Ron Perlman stars as the titular character, alongside Selma Blair, Jeffrey Tambor, Karel Roden, Rupert Evans, and John Hurt. The film draws inspiration from the debut comic Hellboy: Seed of Destruction. In the film, a charismatic demon-turned-investigator named "Hellboy" works with the secretive Bureau of Paranormal Research and Defense to suppress paranormal threats, when a resurrected sorcerer seeks to make Hellboy fulfill his destiny by triggering the apocalypse.

Hellboy had its premiere at the Mann Village Theater in Los Angeles on March 30, 2004, and was released in the United States on April 2. The film received generally positive reviews from critics and grossed $99.8 million against a production budget between $60–66 million. The film was followed by a sequel, Hellboy II: The Golden Army, in 2008, and two reboots.

== Plot ==
In 1944 during World War II, Grigori Rasputin, his disciples Ilsa von Haupstein and Obersturmbannführer Karl Ruprecht Kroenen, and a group of Nazis build a dimensional portal to free demonic entities called Ogdru Jahad: The Seven Gods of Chaos to help them win the war. However, young scientist Trevor "Broom" Bruttenholm and an Allied strike force interrupt them and destroy the portal, which pulls in Rasputin while Haupstein and Kroenen escape. The Allied team soon discovers an infant demon with a stony right hand had come through the portal and dub him "Hellboy", who Broom adopts as his son.

Sixty years later, the eternally youthful Haupstein and Kroenen resurrect Rasputin. Meanwhile, FBI agent John Myers is transferred to the Bureau for Paranormal Research and Defense (BPRD) at Broom's request and assigned to assist the adult Hellboy and an amphibious psychic humanoid named Abraham "Abe" Sapien before the BPRD are sent to investigate an incident at a museum, where Hellboy battles a creature called Samael. After defeating it, Hellboy visits former BPRD member Liz Sherman at a mental hospital, which she committed herself to due to her unstable pyrokinetic abilities. Concurrently, Abe learns that Samael was resurrected by Rasputin, who imbued it with the power to lay eggs that allow it to reincarnate and split its essence every time it dies.

Concluding Samael made a nest in the sewer where Hellboy defeated it, Hellboy, Abe, and several FBI agents work to destroy them. However, Hellboy breaks off to pursue Kroenen, Abe is injured after locating the nest, and Kroenen kills most of the agents before shutting down his cyborg body to trick the BPRD into recovering him. As Hellboy is reprimanded by FBI director Tom Manning, Rasputin secretly manipulates Liz into returning to the BRPD. Discovering Myers taking Liz out for coffee, a jealous Hellboy covertly follows them, leaving the BPRD defenseless. Kroenen reanimates himself, allowing Rasputin to infiltrate the base and confront Broom. Rasputin reveals he intends to use Hellboy to destroy the world, but Broom asserts Hellboy will always be his son. Respecting Broom for raising Hellboy, Rasputin orders Kroenen to kill Broom quickly.

Manning takes over the BPRD and leads a group in locating Rasputin's mausoleum, but everyone gets separated. As Hellboy and Manning locate and kill Kroenen, Liz and Myers find Samael's new nest. Hellboy reunites with them, but is overwhelmed by the creatures until Liz incinerates them and the nest, unwittingly allowing Rasputin and Haupstein to capture her, Hellboy, and Myers. Rasputin absorbs Liz's soul to force Hellboy to reopen the portal and release the Ogdru Jahad in exchange for returning it. Myers frees himself, subdues Haupstein, and reminds Hellboy that he can defy his destiny. Remembering his true self and what Broom brought him up to be, Hellboy reseals the Ogdru Jahad and mortally wounds Rasputin. Nonetheless, Rasputin expels a spawn of the Ogdru Jahad called the Behemoth, which kills him and Haupstein. Undeterred, Hellboy allows the monster to eat him and detonates a grenade belt inside it, killing it. Afterward, he revives Liz and shares a kiss with her.

== Cast ==
- Ron Perlman as Hellboy
- Selma Blair as Liz Sherman
- Jeffrey Tambor as Tom Manning
- Karel Roden as Grigori Rasputin
- Rupert Evans as John Myers
- Brian Steele as Sammael
- Doug Jones as Abe Sapien
  - David Hyde Pierce as the voice of Abe Sapien (uncredited)
- John Hurt as Trevor "Broom" Bruttenholm
  - Kevin Trainor as young Bruttenholm

In addition, Ladislav Beran plays Karl Ruprecht Kroenen, Bridget Hodson appears as Ilsa Haupstein, William Hoyland as Klaus Werner von Krupt, Angus MacInnes as U.S. Army Sergeant Whitman and Corey Johnson (credited as John William Johnson) as Agent Clay.

== Production ==
=== Development ===
"The movie becomes a story of two fathers with a single son. He [Hellboy] has one father in Broom, and another father in Rasputin. It's a very graphic way of representing Hellboy's conflict."

— Del Toro on the film's central theme.

Initially, Batman: The Animated Series director Kevin Altieri was pursuing an animated adaptation of Hellboy and had meetings with Mike Mignola and Dark Horse Comics that ultimately didn't lead to anything, but after failing to gain any traction instead opted to shift focus to an adaptation of Gen¹³.

Guillermo del Toro and Hellboy creator Mike Mignola envisioned the film as a Ray Harryhausen film. The film was shopped and rejected by various studios for years due to studios disliking the title, script and the fact that Ron Perlman was cast as Hellboy. Harryhausen was invited by Del Toro to teach the film's animators what made his effects techniques unique but declined, feeling that modern films were too violent.

=== Writing ===
The film is loosely based on the debut comic Hellboy: Seed of Destruction. While writing the script, Del Toro researched occult Nazi philosophies and used them as a reference for the film's opening scene. In an early version of the script, the gyroscope portal was described as being made out of rails that formed into pentagrams, hexagrams and inverted stars to illustrate the film's magic and occult elements. Del Toro chose to alter the origin from the comic to give main characters interconnected origins.

Labyrinths became a motif for the film to represent Hellboy's conflict of "choosing the right path". This was reflected in the film's opening titles. Del Toro felt that labyrinths represent the film's themes regarding "choices and taking different turns and choosing different destinies," Del Toro stated, "A labyrinth, it is said, is not a place to be lost, but a place to find yourself". Del Toro chose to add context to the BPRD logo by rooting the film's version in Catholic mythology by adding archangels in Broom's office. Del Toro wrote Hellboy's dialogue with Perlman in mind for the role, prior to casting him. Del Toro noted that he tried to emulate Jack Kirby and Harryhausen's action style for the film's action scenes.

Hellboy's gun was given the name "Samaritan" for the film to illustrate the BPRD's techno-magic. Del Toro approached the love story with a reverse "Beauty and the Beast" approach, stating, "I wanted the beauty to turn into a beast in the end to fully assume her mortal gifts... and when she accepts herself for what she is, a monster, then she can love the monster [Hellboy]". The idea of Hellboy spying on Liz Sherman and John Myers was originally written for a separate script titled Meat Market, A Love Story. While Professor Trevor "Broom" Bruttenholm's death happened early in the comics, del Toro wished to delay it to have audiences become attached to the character and "make it painful to lose that character".

=== Pre-production ===
Aside from working with Perlman before, Del Toro chose him for the title role because he felt Perlman could deliver subtlety and nuance with makeup. Vin Diesel was linked to the role when the film was being proposed at Universal Pictures, and Jeremy Renner was offered the "title role" but turned it down due to having no attachment to the source material. Del Toro assigned his real life friend, Santiago Segura, to play the train driver who assaults Hellboy. David Hyde Pierce was hired to provide the voice for Abe Sapien due to Pierce being a "bigger name" and having a "more recognizable sound". Pierce refused to take credit, perform press tours or attend the premiere out of respect for Doug Jones.

=== Filming ===
The film was shot 6 days a week for 130 days, Mondays through Saturdays without a second unit in 2003. Sundays were reserved for editing. Del Toro noted that the film could have commenced filming in 1998, however, the film had difficulty finding a committed studio due to the stigma Hollywood associated superhero and comic book films with, at the time. The action scenes were staged after Harryhausen films with little to no camera movement using wide shots. The cemetery sequence was filmed in a real cemetery in Prague.

== Soundtrack ==
Hellboy's film score was composed by Marco Beltrami, conducted by Pete Anthony and Beltrami, and performed by the Skywalker Symphony Orchestra.

== Release ==
=== Theatrical ===
Hellboy had its world premiere at the Mann Village Theater in Westwood, Los Angeles, California on March 30, 2004, and subsequently opened in wide release on April 2, where it grossed $23.1 million in 3,028 theaters on its opening weekend. It went on to gross $59.7 million in North America and $40.2 million in the rest of the world for a worldwide total of $99.8 million against a budget of $66 million. Mike Mignola, the original creator of the Hellboy character, has stated that he was "very happy" with the Hellboy films.

Some theaters refused to host the film due to the word "hell" being used in the title. Certain theaters in the South marketed the film as "Helloboy," to avoid perceptions of sacrilege with the then-release of The Passion of the Christ. The film was dropped from certain theaters during Easter, despite still playing nationwide. Certain toy chains also refused to carry the film's products due to the word "hell" in the title. In Malaysia, the film was retitled "Super Sapiens" for local theatre release due to the same issues regarding the title "Hellboy".

Del Toro noted that the following scene after a rock hits the screen was carelessly removed by projectionists in American theaters. He deduced that projectionists believed the reel had ended.

=== Home media ===
Hellboy was released on DVD in a two-disc special-edition version on July 27, 2004, less than sixteen weeks after it opened in theaters. Included were video introductions by Del Toro and Selma Blair, plus a feature that allowed viewers to click during selected parts of the film to comics drawn by Mike Mignola. Other bonus features include two audio commentaries, one by Del Toro and Mignola; and the other by Ron Perlman, Selma Blair, Jeffrey Tambor, and Rupert Evans, which was recorded on April 12, 2004. The special features also include visits to the "Right Hand of Doom" set and a two-hour documentary. Another addition was four theatrical animated UPA shorts; Gerald McBoing-Boing (1950), How Now Boing Boing (1954), Gerald McBoing! Boing! on Planet Moo (1956) and The Tell-Tale Heart (1953). This DVD topped the Nielsen VideoScan's First Alert DVD sales chart and the Video Store magazine's list of top rentals for the week ending August 1, 2004, registering a total of more than a half-million units in sales.

A three-disc unrated director's cut DVD set was released on October 19, 2004. In addition to all of the features of the original two-disc set, with the exception of a new director's commentary replacing the old one, new features included Del Toro introducing 20 minutes of additional and extended scenes, a composer commentary with isolated score replacing the cast commentary, a Cast Video Commentary with Perlman, Blair, Tambor and Rupert Evans, multiple production workshop featurettes, a Comic Con 2002 Panel Discussion with Del Toro, Perlman and Mignola, and A Quick Guide to Understanding Comics with Scott McCloud.

A high-definition Blu-ray version of the director's cut was released on June 5, 2007. It contains most of the same content as the DVD set, but is missing a few features such as the video commentary and the composer commentary. An Ultra HD Blu-ray version was released on October 15, 2019, with many of the remaining bonus features from the 3-disc reinstated and both cuts remastered in 4K resolution.

== Reception ==
=== Critical response ===
On Rotten Tomatoes, the film holds an approval rating of 81% based on 205 reviews with an average rating of 6.8/10. The site's critical consensus reads, "With wit, humor and Guillermo del Toro's fantastic visuals, the entertaining Hellboy transcends the derivative nature of the genre." Metacritic assigned the film a weighted average score of 72 out of 100, based on 37 critics, indicating "generally favorable" reviews. Audiences surveyed by CinemaScore gave the film a grade "B−" on scale of A to F.

Entertainment Weekly gave the film a "B" rating and wrote, "Pop pretensions can't undo a basic contradiction: that our hero is fighting metaphysical evil with pure, meaty brawn. Hellboy is engaging, but it's got a lot more boy in it than hell". In his review for The New York Times, Elvis Mitchell wrote, "Mr. del Toro avidly lavishes this texture on Hellboy ... giving it a kiss of distinction. It's an elegant haunted house of a picture with dread and yearning part of the eeriness". Roger Ebert gave the film three and half stars out of four and praised Ron Perlman's performance: "And in Ron Perlman, it has found an actor who is not just playing a superhero, but enjoying it ... he chomps his cigar, twitches his tail and battles his demons with something approaching glee. You can see an actor in the process of making an impossible character really work". The film also received good reviews in the British press – for example, Peter Bradshaw from The Guardian commented amusedly on the unhistoricity of the Nazis invading Britain in the initial sequence but overall called the film "bizarre and loopy, romantic and dynamic". Claudia Puig USA Today was less enthusiastic and wrote, "Hellboy's special effects don't offer much of anything new, its far-fetched plot leaves a bit to be desired, and there is plenty that flat-out doesn't make sense. Those unfamiliar with the comic book may leave the theater bedeviled and scratching their heads".

In 2022, Rolling Stone and Variety named the film one of the best superhero films of all times.

=== Accolades ===
Hellboy was nominated for four Saturn Awards in 2005, including Best Fantasy Film, Best Special Edition DVD Release, and Best Make-Up, which it won. The film was also nominated for a Visual Effects Society Award in the category of "Outstanding Performance by an Animated Character in a Live Action Motion Picture." In 2007, Rotten Tomatoes declared Hellboy to be the 13th best-reviewed comic book film adaptation, out of 94 total. In 2008, Empire magazine ranked Hellboy 11th in their list of "The 20 Greatest Comic Book Movies".

== See also ==
- List of films featuring eclipses
