= William Hoyland =

British actor (1943-2017)

- Born: 10 November 1943; Edgbaston, England
- Died: 15 July 2017 (aged 73)
- Occupation: Actor
- Years active: 1967–2017
- Spouse: Carole De Jong

William Hoyland (10 November 1943 – 15 July 2017) was an English actor whose career spanned fifty years. He appeared in several British television series.

== Career ==
After a Quaker education at Leighton Park in Reading, Hoyland started out in a short film titled You're Human Like The Rest of Them in 1967. After several small roles in well-known series, such as "Budgie", Z-Cars, and Coronation Street, he appeared in five episodes of the 1976 television mini-series Bill Brand, as Sandiford.

Two years later, he appeared in the 1978 All Creatures Great and Small episode "The Name of the Game" as Mr. Blenkinsopp, the village's vicar. He reprised the role two episodes later in "Ways and Means".

Hoyland had a brief role in the 1981 Bond film For Your Eyes Only as McGregor, a military officer serving as caretaker of a classified device aboard the spy ship St. Georges. He also appeared in Star Wars Episode VI: Return of the Jedi as Commander Igar. His character captured Luke Skywalker, and handed both the rebel and his lightsaber over to Darth Vader.

In addition to acting in over seventy productions in cinema and television, Hoyland was also a noted stage actor. In 1974, he joined the Joint Stock Theatre Company and found success playing Field Marshal Wilhelm Keitel in Nuremberg and Donald Rumsfeld in Guantánamo: Honor Bound to Defend Freedom. In 2016, the year before his death, he acted in A Month of Sundays, a play written by Robert Larbey and set in an old folk's home.

In 1996, Hoyland again played an officer, this time as Arthur Fieldson in the mini-series Our Friends In The North. He went on to play a number of other officers, barristers, and doctors in various productions past the turn of the century. In 2004 he appeared as Klaus Werner von Krupt in Hellboy. Later, he also had minor roles in Mr. Sloane and Call The Midwife. His last role, aired in the year of his death, was as a headmaster in the mini-series Man In An Orange Shirt.

== Personal life ==
Hoyland was born to Denys and Doreen Hoyland. He never knew his father, a Quaker who was training as a teacher when he was conscripted in World War II. He was killed in Italy.

He was married to Carole De Jong, his third wife, and had two children from his first marriage.

== Death ==
Hoyland was diagnosed with stomach cancer early in 2017. He died from the disease on 15 July, aged 73.

== Filmography ==
Year	Title	Role	Notes
1971	Assault	Chemist in hospital	
1972	The Ragman's Daughter	Borstal Barber	
1972	Adult Fun	Policeman in ice cream parlour	
1981	For Your Eyes Only	McGregor	
1982	Gandhi	Adjutant	
1983	Return of the Jedi	Commander Igar	uncredited
1985	Plenty	Priest	
1989	Resurrected	Captain Sinclair	
1989	Diamond Skulls	Inspector Orchard	
1998	Love Is the Devil: Study for a Portrait of Francis Bacon	Police Sergeant	
2004	Hellboy	Klaus Werner von Krupt	
2006	Scoop	Butler	
2007	A Mighty Heart	John Bauman	
2013	Still Life	Priest no.2	
