= Bridget Hodson =

English actress

- Born: England
- Other name: Biddy Hodson (1983–2004)
- Occupation: Actress
- Years active: 1983, 1994–2008
- Notable work: The Mists of Avalon

Bridget Hodson is an English actress known for her roles of Elaine in the mini-series The Mists of Avalon and Ilsa Haupstein in the film Hellboy. She used the stage name Biddy Hodson from 1983 to 2004 and her name Bridget Hodson from 2004 onwards.

== Filmography ==
Year	Title	Role	Notes
1994	Loaded	Charlotte	
1997	Wilde	Gwendolen	in stage production of The Importance of Being Earnest
2000	Bedazzled	Play Actor	
2001	Beginner's Luck	Minnie	
2004	Hellboy	Ilsa Haupstein	(as Bridget Hodson)

== Television ==
Year	Title	Role	Notes
1983	St. Ursula's in Danger	Kitty	TV film
1995	A Mind to Murder	Jennifer Priddy	TV film
1995	Cracker	Carol Barker	Episode: "True Romance"
1995	Soldier Soldier	2nd Lt Samantha Sheridan	8 episodes
1996	Heartbeat	Sophie	Episode: "Charity Begins at Home"
1997	No Child of Mine	Miss Lewis	TV film
1999	The Mystery of Men	Fay Dunbar	TV film
2000	Rough Treatment	Helen Masters	TV film
2000-2006	Casualty	Laura Abrams / Charlotte Dewitt	2 episodes (as Bridget Hudson when playing Charlotte Dewitt)
2001	The Mists of Avalon	Elaine	2 episodes
2002-2005	Doctors	Mary Lawson / Julie Marsden	2 episodes
2008	Doctor Who	Captain Marian Price	Episodes: "The Stolen Earth/Journey's End"
