= Ladislav Beran =

Czech actor

- Born: 8 February 1967 (age 59); Czechoslovakia
- Occupations: Actor, choreographer

Ladislav Beran (born 8 February 1967) is a Czech actor and choreographer.

Beran was born in Czechoslovakia. He was a choreographer for the film Rebelové (2001), and appeared as a drug dealer in the film Blade II (2002). He has also made an appearance in the superhero film Hellboy (2004), starring as Karl Ruprecht Kroenen. The latter two films were directed by Guillermo del Toro.

== Filmography ==
Year	Title	Role	Notes
2001	Rebelové	Trombonist	
2002	Blade II	Drug Dealer	
2004	Hellboy	Karl Ruprecht Kroenen	
2011	Mission: Impossible – Ghost Protocol	Control Room Guard #1	
