= Lobster Johnson =

Comic book character

The Lobster
- The Lobster

Publication information
- Publisher: Dark Horse Comics
- First appearance: Hellboy: Box of Evil #1 (August 1999)
- Created by: Mike Mignola

In-story information
- Species: Human
- Notable aliases: The Claw

Lobster Johnson (also known as The Lobster or The Claw) is a fictional character featured in the Hellboy and Bureau for Paranormal Research and Defense comic books published by Dark Horse Comics. He was created by Mike Mignola.

Within the Hellboy universe, the Lobster was a vigilante who worked in secret in New York City during the 1930s. Although the public believes that the Lobster was only the hero of pulp serials and comics, he was a real man who faced gangsters as well as paranormal threats. The Lobster had a reputation for violence, such as killing mobsters and burning his trademark lobster claw symbol into their foreheads with the palm of his gloved hand. This behavior was similar to the Marvel UK comic book character Night Raven, the Phantom and the pulp magazine hero The Spider.

Lobster Johnson appeared in the 2019 Hellboy reboot, portrayed by Thomas Haden Church.

== Fictional biography ==
=== Life and death ===
The Lobster started his career in 1932, working with a small but trusted group of allies out of a secret base in the sewers of New York City. Together, they fought against gangsters, spies, and the like. In 1937, the gang came up against one of their most imposing enemies to date – the inscrutable and immeasurably powerful Memnan Saa, during the case of the Iron Prometheus. Though the Lobster and his allies escaped the confrontation with their lives, tragedy dogged them thereafter as they continued to research his crimes and history. One by one, the Lobster's allies met various gruesome and mysterious ends, until the Lobster called off the search. The deaths seemed to weigh heavy on his conscience – always a quiet man, he became increasingly cold and taciturn. Not long after this, he accepted an offer of employment from the United States Government, a chance to lay some ghosts to rest.

Aided by a new sidekick, the Lobster spent the late 1930s combating the Nazi threat to the United States. One of his unsuccessful missions involved the escape of a Nazi criminal in Colorado who destroyed a train full of scientists bound for the Manhattan Project, resulting in the death of his sidekick.

The Lobster's final mission was an unsuccessful attempt to prevent the Nazis from launching a space capsule at Hunte Castle, Austria, on 20 March 1939. Arriving seconds too late to stop the launch itself, he managed to force the roof of Hunte Castle closed, but the capsule burst through regardless. The subsequent explosion and fire completely gutted the castle. Besides Nazi scientist Herman von Klempt and one German soldier, there were no survivors, including the Lobster himself.

=== Legacy ===
According to B.P.R.D. Director Tom Manning (in The Conqueror Worm), Lobster Johnson was a fictional character created in the pulp magazines and made briefly popular in a couple of movies such as The Phantom Jungle (Republic, 1945), in which he was portrayed by Vic Williams. In the backup materials of The Iron Prometheus, we learn of his appearances in pulp magazines, comic books, movie serials, and masked Mexican wrestling movies. It is revealed that the character is properly called "The Lobster". "Johnson" was the last name of his alter ego, crippled millionaire Walter Johnson, created by the author of the pulp stories. It was the masked Mexican wrestling movies that combined the names as "Lobster Johnson".

"Latchkey Memories from Crab Point" is a memoir by Guy Davis, presented in the back matter to the B.P.R.D.: The Black Goddess trade paperback, in which he recounts childhood memories of seeing "the cut-up and dubbed version of the Mexican Lobster Johnson films!" presented on children's after-school television as a black-and-white serial called The Masked Claw.

=== Afterlife ===
Death was not the end for the Lobster. The Lobster's ghost was one of the strongest yet seen in the Hellboy universe. He was completely corporeal when he chose to be, firing his pistol with deadly effect and burning his sign into the forehead of his victims. It would appear that the Lobster's death greatly increased his powers, as opposed to the Ghost of Rasputin, who was rendered almost immaterial by his death at Abe Sapien's hands.

In 2001, Hellboy (a lifelong Lobster fan) and Roger the homunculus encountered his ghost in the haunted ruins of Hunte Castle, beginning a long association between the Lobster and the BPRD, and with Roger and Johann Kraus in particular. The Lobster was instrumental in helping them defeat Rasputin, the Conqueror Worm and Hermann von Klempt, completing in death the mission he had failed to do in life.

Having seemingly formed some bond with Roger during the mission, it was to the homunculus that he next appeared, when in 2003 he helped Roger and Liz Sherman resolve another of his failed missions – bringing to justice the elderly German saboteur in Colorado. The Lobster was quiet for some time after this, although his ghostly presence was half-felt by Johann several times in the basement of the BPRD's new WWII-era base in the Colorado mountains.

It was not until his old adversary Memnan Saa began to make his presence felt to the BPRD during the war against Sadu Hem's frog monsters that he returned in earnest; briefly taking possession of Johann's ectoplasm in the wake of Ben Daimio's disastrous end of relations with the team to break the hold Saa had gained over Liz. With something of his past association with Saa thus revealed, the team held a séance not long afterwards in which his spirit gave them their first clues in the search for Saa, using the information he had uncovered decades before in his investigations. When the BPRD finally traced Saa to his base somewhere on the Stanovoy Ridge, the Lobster again took possession of Johann's form in the closing moments of the denouement in an attempt to defeat his old nemesis. With all his business on earth thus concluded, Kate took him back to Hunte Castle in Austria, where he relinquished his hold on Johann's ectoplasm and rejoined the ghostly throng inhabiting the castle – having found his own sort of peace in an afterlife where he could continue his battle against Nazis and the forces of evil forever after.

=== Skills and abilities ===
The Lobster was an expert combatant. He usually wielded either one or two pistols, but he had used a submachine gun on at least one occasion, and showed skill with both firearms. The Lobster had also occasionally used other weapons such as swords, spears, or even the leg of a broken chair. He was also shown to be a proficient unarmed fighter.

The Lobster somehow remained alive after explosions and possibly being hit by gunfire in Lobster Johnson: The Burning Hand #2. There has not yet been any explanation of the Lobster's powers, however.

In the stories set in the 1930s, the Lobster possessed technology that was advanced for its time. He had used a bulletproof vest on at least one occasion, and he also used a radio that was small enough to be built into his helmet. It is not shown in the comics who invented these.

== Appearances outside the Lobster Johnson series ==
- Hellboy: Box Full of Evil (2 issues, August–September, 1999) by Mike Mignola, Matthew Dow Smith & Ryan Sook.
- Hellboy: Conqueror Worm (4 issues, May–August 2001) by Mike Mignola.
- B.P.R.D.: Night Train (1 issue, September 17, 2003) by Geoff Johns, Scott Kolins & Dave Stewart.
- B.P.R.D.: Killing Ground (5 issues, August–December 2007) by Mike Mignola, John Arcudi & Guy Davis.
- B.P.R.D.: The Black Goddess (5 issues) by Mike Mignola, John Arcudi and Guy Davis.
- B.P.R.D.: King of Fear (5 issues, January–May 2010) by Mike Mignola, John Arcudi and Guy Davis.

== Other media ==
=== Film ===
Thomas Haden Church as Lobster Johnson in Hellboy (2019).

==== Hellboy: Blood and Iron (2007) ====
Lobster Johnson has a brief cameo in the second animated Hellboy film, Blood and Iron, appearing during a flashback scene showing Hellboy's birth and Malcolm Frost's reaction to the creature. After the credits, there is a teaser for the unproduced third film The Phantom Claw, where his ghost would have helped Hellboy and Kate Corrigan in battling the ghost of Rasputin.

==== Hellboy (2019) ====
The Lobster was featured in the 2019 film Hellboy, portrayed by Thomas Haden Church in a flashback and mid-credits scene, as a ghost.

=== Miscellaneous ===
- In 2007, Dark Horse produced a magnet that bore Lobster Johnson's animated design, based on his brief appearance in Hellboy: Blood and Iron.
- A novel centered around the Lobster, Lobster Johnson: The Satan Factory by Thomas E. Sniegoski, was released in July 2009.
- The Lobster is mentioned in an intro dialogue between Hellboy and Jay Garrick in Injustice 2.
- 1000toys has released a 1/12 action figure of Lobster Johnson

Big Bad Toy Store
