= Grigori Rasputin (Hellboy) =

Hellboy supervillain

- Rasputin by Mike Mignola

Publication information
- Publisher: Dark Horse Comics
- First appearance: Hellboy: Seed of Destruction (1994)
- Created by: Mike Mignola; John Bryne

In-story information
- Full name: Grigori Efimovich Rasputin
- Team affiliations: Nazis
- Notable aliases: Rasputin, The Mad Monk

Grigori Yefimovich Rasputin is a supervillain in the American comic book series Hellboy. The character was created by Mike Mignola and John Byrne, and was based on the real-life Russian mystic of the same name. Rasputin serves as the second archenemy of Hellboy after the Ogdru Jahad.

== Fictional biography ==
In 1895, questioning his powers and purpose, Rasputin is visited by the witch Baba Yaga who told him that he is destined to father a new age. Rasputin then allowed Baba Yaga to take a fragment of his soul and hide it within the roots of Yggdrasil to become immortal. It was only after his assassination by Prince Felix Yusupov on December 16, 1916 that Rasputin is contacted by the Ogdru Jahad as he is revived. They enlisted him as their mortal agent in the world. Soon after, Rasputin was contacted by the Nazis to begin development on an occult method for ending the war. From this, Project Ragna Rok was born. The Nazis sought to use Rasputin to defeat the Allies, but Rasputin knew this would never happen. He merely intended to use the Nazis' resources as long as he could to achieve his own goals: to trigger the apocalypse which would jumpstart a new Eden.

=== Hellboy: Seed of Destruction ===
During World War II, Rasputin conducted a ritual to summon the means to allow the Ogdru Jahad to destroy the Earth. But the summoning accidentally placed the creature to carry out the deed, later named Hellboy, in the hands of the Allies. Having already known that the war is lost and Hitler's eventual death, Rasputin tells those among Project Ragna Rok he sees as loyal to seek refuge in their base at Norway while he traveled to the Arctic Circle at the beckoning of Sadu-Hem, a monstrous spawn of the Ogdru Jahad. There, Rasputin entered a meditative state. Rasputin resurfaced in 1994 when awakened by an expedition group, using them to reach the Cavendish estate. Rasputin lured Hellboy to the manor to have him free the Ogdru Jahad from their crystal prisons. Due to Hellboy refusing he decides to free them by siphoning power from Liz Sherman into Sadu-Hem. But with the timely intervention of Abe Sapien impaling him while under the influence of the ghost of Elihu Cavendish, Rasputin ends up being reduced to a skeleton as Liz's flames incinerate Sadu-Hem. Though Rasputin attempts to convince Hellboy to spare him, he ends up being physically destroyed.

=== Hellboy: Wake the Devil ===
Rasputin re-appeared as a ghost while his revived pawns attempted to restore the vampire Vladimir Giurescu to life. Rasputin directed Ilsa Haupstein, a loyal member of Project Ragna Rok, to abandon her efforts to revive Giurescu and instead place herself within an enchanted iron maiden under the notion that she would be infused into the relic so she can endure the Ogdru Jahad when they burn the world. Leaving Ilsa, unaware that she died spiritually and only become a vessel for the goddess Hecate after her previous physical form was destroyed by Hellboy, Rasputin targets Abe Sapien and prophesies that Abe will suffer the same death as he did. After the unintended destruction of Project Ragna Rok's base, Rasputin pays a visit to Baba Yaga at Yggdrasil. While he offered to stay with her, Rasputin says that he'll go on and continue to try to make himself a god.

=== Hellboy: Conqueror Worm and Darkness Calls ===
Rasputin appeared lastly in his ghostly form as a counsel to Inger von Klempt. He persuaded her that she was to be the first of a final race of men, but she was executed by Lobster Johnson and the end of the world was averted with the destruction of the Conqueror Worm. Afterward, Rasputin attempts to command Hecate into doing his bidding, and they begin bickering about the Apocalypse and Hellboy. Hecate then destroys Rasputin's ghostly form, with his remnants retreating to the roots of the Yggdrasil, where Baba Yaga gathered what remained of his soul and placed it in an acorn. Despite no longer having a presence in world events, Rasputin's prophecy for Abe comes to light in the BPRD side story Plague of Frogs through a doomsday cult led by an acolyte of the Ogdru Jahad named Humbert who became a host for a regenerated Sadu-Hem and fulfilled Abe's near-death experience.

Later, as Hellboy is trying to fight his way out of the Baba Yaga's world, the witch puts as much of her power as she can into her slave Koschei the Deathless to kill Hellboy. As she runs out of her own power, she states she has one more try, and wants to use the spirit of Rasputin (still in the acorn), to power Koschei. But her servant, Koku, throws the acorn away out of fear, with the acorn holding Rasputin's soul falling through a crack in Yggdrasil that leads to Hell.

=== B.P.R.D. ===
In Plague of Frogs Abe Sapien was stabbed by Humbert, a cult leader who was responsible for creating an army of frog monsters which would ultimately lead to the awakening of the Ogdru Hem. It is theorized that Rasputin was somehow influencing Humbert, taking revenge for his death. Later, in The Devil You Know, Rasputin was resurrected as the newest avatar of the Ogdru Jahad. After reanimating every Ogdru Hem on the planet, he snapped Abe's spine, swatted Liz aside like a fly, and tore off Hellboy's right hand. Before he could use it, however, Hellboy snapped his neck, before collapsing and dying of blood loss. The Ogdru Hem later eradicated most of humanity before Hellboys severed hand was used to stop them. Humanity fled underground, while the surface was repopulated by Icthyo Sapiens which emerged from Abe's corpse.

== In other media ==
Grigori Rasputin as seen in the first Hellboy film, played by Karel Roden

Actor Karel Roden played Rasputin, the main antagonist, in the 2004 film adaptation of Hellboy. Rasputin's inability to die is explained to be the result of an otherworldly being residing in his body that the man considers a god, his "god" slowly manifesting within him through each resurrection. Rasputin is seen working with the Nazis in the film and demonstrated great occult abilities linked with the underworld. In the beginning of the film, he succeeds in opening a portal to the dimension of the Ogdru Jahad, but the portal was sabotaged by the Allied Forces. After (unknowingly) letting Hellboy through, Rasputin was sucked into the portal before it vanished entirely. He was then resurrected by Ilsa and Kroenen in an Arctic temple, the director's cut revealing that he was rendered eyeless before being provided with Ocular prosthesis after Hellboy's initial fight with Sammael. Needing to prepare for an upcoming eclipse that would allow him to bring the Ogdru Jahad, Rasputin orchestrates various events throughout the movie to have Hellboy realize his true calling in summoning the entities. But Hellboy rejects Rasputin and stabs him with one of his own severed horns, causing Rasputin's "god" to emerge, crushing Rasputin and Ilsa in the process.

In the sequel, Hellboy II: The Golden Army, though director Guillermo del Toro could not add it into the after-credits for budget reasons, set up an animated sequel that reveals Rasputin's ghost aiding Roderick Zinco to resurrect Kroenen, telling Zinco he has one final mission to perform for him.

Markos Rounthwaite portrays Rasputin in the 2019 reboot Hellboy, only appearing in flashbacks where he oversaw Project Ragnarok before being killed by Lobster Johnson.
