= Hellboy (disambiguation) =

Hellboy is a fictional character, created by writer-artist Mike Mignola.

Hellboy or Hell Boys, may also refer to:

== Hellboy franchise ==
- Hellboy Universe, the fictional universe of the Hellboy comic book
- Hellboy (franchise), the multimedia franchise based on the Hellboy comic book

=== Comic book mini-series ===
- List of Hellboy comics, a chronological list of Hellboy, B.P.R.D., and related comic books and collections

=== Feature films ===
- Hellboy (2004 film), 2004 supernatural action-thriller film directed by Guillermo del Toro, inspired by the fictional Dark Horse Comics character
- Hellboy II: The Golden Army, 2008 fantasy-superhero film sequel directed by Guillermo del Toro
- Hellboy (2019 film), 2019 supernatural superhero film reboot directed by Neil Marshall and heavily based on the fictional Dark Horse Comics character
- Hellboy: The Crooked Man, 2024 fantasy-horror movie reboot

=== Animated films ===
- Hellboy Animated, original straight-to-DVD animated films based upon the comic book character
  - Hellboy: Sword of Storms, first of the Hellboy Animated series
  - Hellboy: Blood and Iron, second in the Hellboy Animated series

=== Video games ===
- Hellboy: Asylum Seeker, 2000 video game, developed by Cryo Studios
- Hellboy: The Science of Evil, 2008 video game based on the comic book character of the same name

== Sports ==
- Jeremy Hellickson (born 1987), an American baseball pitcher, known by the nickname "Hellboy"
- Hell Boy, the ring name of a Mexican luchador pro-wrestler; see 2023 in professional wrestling
- Budweis Hellboys, a team in the Czech League of American Football
- Hell Boys (Пеколни момци), a nickname for the sports fan club Čkembari
- Malice Hellboys, a fictional sports team; see List of fictional sports teams

== Music ==
- Hellboy (Lil Peep mixtape), 2016
- The Hellboys, a band featuring Adán Jodorowsky

=== Songs ===
- "Hellboy" (song), a 2017 song by Trippie Redd off the album A Love Letter to You 2
- "Hellboy" (song), a 2016 song by Lil Peep, the title track of the eponymous mixtape Hellboy (Lil Peep mixtape)
- "Hell Boy" (song), a 2015 single by Seth Sentry of the 2014 album Strange New Past
- "Hell Boy" (地獄少年), a 2006 song from the album Jigoku Shōjo Original Soundtrack II; see List of Hell Girl soundtracks

== Other uses ==
- "Hellboy", a fossil of a Regaliceratops peterhewsi dinosaur, the type specimen for the species and genus Regaliceratops
- Hell Boy (地獄少年, Jigoku Shōnen), a fictional character from the anime-manga Hell Girl; see List of Hell Girl characters
- Hellboy, a fictional character from the 2003 film Haggard: The Movie
