= Hellboy: The Chained Coffin and Others =

Trade paperback collection of the Hellboy series created by Mike Mignola

- Trade Paperback Cover

Publication information
- Publisher: Dark Horse Comics
- Format: Trade Paperback
- Genre: Action/adventure, horror
- Publication date: August 5, 1998
- Main characters: Hellboy; Kate Corrigan; Roger; Abe Sapien; Liz Sherman

Creative team
- Created by: Mike Mignola
- Written by: Mike Mignola
- Artist: Mike Mignola
- Letterer: Pat Brosseau
- Colorists: Dave Stewart; Matt Hollingsworth; James Sinclair
- Editor: Scott Allie

Collected editions
- 'Hellboy: The Chained Coffin and Others': ISBN 978-1-59307-091-5

Hellboy: The Chained Coffin and Others is the third trade paperback collection in the Hellboy series created by Mike Mignola, published by Dark Horse Comics on August 5, 1998. The book collects various mini-series, one-shots and back-up features featuring the fictional paranormal detective Hellboy.

== Contents ==
=== The Corpse ===
Cover by Mignola

This story by Mike Mignola based on the Irish folktale Teig O'Kane and the Corpse was originally serialized in two-page instalments in Capital City's Advance Comics #75-#82 and was reprinted in full for the first time in the one-shot The Corpse and the Iron Shoes (January 1, 1996) along with back-up feature Iron Shoes. Mignola has stated that when he first completed the story he thought that the limitations of the two-page format meant that it was the worst he had ever written, but feedback from people he respects has caused him to change his mind and he now believes it is one of the best. The story introduced Alice Monaghan and Gruagach, who would play a larger role in later storylines.

The story was later reprinted in the one-shot Hellboy: The Corpse (March 24, 2004) published to tie-in with the release of the first Hellboy film with behind-the-scenes art from a sequence it inspired.

In 1959 Ireland, Hellboy is enlisted by the Monaghan couple to deal with their daughter Alice who was stolen by fairies and replaced with a changeling named Gruagach. After exposing Gruagach by burning him with iron, Hellboy learns that Alice will be returned on the condition that he gives the body of Tam O'Clannie a Christian burial before dawn. While Dagda sees Hellboy will honor the deal, a revenge-driven Gruagach attempts to stop him with the aid of Jenny Greenteeth before being swallowed by the released boar-headed giant Grom. Hellboy fights and defeats Grom, whose shrunken hide had bonded with Gruagach, and buried Tam. While Alice is returned to her parents, Hellboy learns that the fairies' child abduction was motivated by their need to avert their eventual extinction as they can no longer have children of their own.

=== Iron Shoes ===
This story by Mike Mignola was created as a back-up feature for the one-shot release of The Corpse as according to Mignola he didn't want to expand that story any further and he liked the sound of the title The Corpse and the Iron Shoes (January 1, 1996).

In the story Hellboy is in Ireland in 1961 for a story introduced by folklorists Edwin D. Wolf and Katherine Boggs in which he battles with the demonic Iron Shoes and delivers it to a local parish church for its destruction.

The story was adapted into the 2007 3-min animated short Hellboy Animated: Iron Shoes, directed by Tad Stones and starring Ron Perlman and Dan Castellaneta, as part of the Hellboy Animated franchise and included as an extra on the Hellboy Animated: Blood and Iron DVD.

=== The Baba Yaga ===
This story by Mike Mignola was planned as a back-up feature for the Monkeyman and O'Brien mini-series by Art Adams but delays to that title meant that in premiered in this collection. The storyline of the incident was originally mentioned in Hellboy: Wake the Devil.

In 1964 Russia, Hellboy travels to a cemetery near Bereznik, where the Russian witch Baba Yaga visits once a year to count dead men's fingers, to end her child abduction. The battle ends with Hellboy shooting out Baba Yaha's left eye, forcing her to retreat to her realm though her connection with Russia renders her immortal.

=== A Christmas Underground ===
This story by Mike Mignola based on an old folktale that he gave a more sinister twist to was first published in the Hellboy Christmas Special he created with Gary Gianni.

In the story Hellboy travels to England on Christmas Eve 1989 where he descends through a passage in a graveyard in search of the daughter of a dying woman who is married to a prince of the underworld.

=== The Chained Coffin ===
This story by Mike Mignola based on an old folktale was first published in Dark Horse Present 100 issue 2.

In the story Hellboy travels back to East Bromwich where he has a vision of a priest and a nun standing vigil over the chained coffin of their mother to protect her soul but when the demon arrives to collect it they are defeated and he turns to Hellboy referring to him as "my favourite son".

=== The Wolves of Saint August ===
Cover for The Wolves of Saint August by Mignola.

This story by Mike Mignola was his first Hellboy story written without the scripting assistance of John Byrne and was originally serialised in eight-page installments as a back-up feature in Dark Horse Presents (issues 88-91, August–November 1994) and was collected in trade paperback Hellboy: The Wolves of Saint August (November 1995) with some additional pages to smooth out the rough edges.

Mignola has stated that the story, based on an Irish folktale about St. Patrick cursing a group of pagans, was written on the advice of editor Barbara Kesel to prove to the audience that the creator was committed to turning Hellboy into an ongoing franchise.

In the story, Hellboy and Corrigan travel to Griart, Balkans in 1994 to find the town decimated by the angry ghosts of werewolves and their associate Father Kelly murdered by a living werewolf.

The trade paperback won the 1996 "Best Graphic Album of Previously Published Work" Harvey Award.

=== Almost Colossus ===
This story by Mike Mignola was originally published in two-issue mini-series Hellboy: Almost Colossus (June–July 1997) with back-up feature Autopsy in B-flat by Gary Gianni. Mignola won the 1998 "Best Writer/Artist: Drama" Eisner Award in part for his work on this mini-series.

Taking place a week after the events of Hellboy: Wake the Devil, Hellboy and Corrigan search for the rogue homunculus that Elizabeth Sherman's group discovered in the Ruins of Czege Castle as she is dying from her pyrokinesis powers being absorbed by the homunculus when he came to life. When Hellboy and Corrigan learn of someone who has been recently robbing graves, they follow the trail to an abandoned castle where are ambushed by the creations of a crude homunculus who is revealed to be 'older brother' to the rogue homunculus. The elder homunculus, having killed his alchemist 'father' to acquire his secrets, is creating a new colossus body for him using metal and human fat and captures Corrigan to add her into its composition. But the rogue homunculus sides with Hellboy and protect Corrigan, using Liz's pyrokinesis to destroy the colossus after his brother merged into it. The homunculus is named "Roger" as he returns to his lifeless state after restoring Liza, Manning have the body brought to the B.P.R.D. base.

=== Gallery ===
This collection includes a pinup gallery featuring art by B. C. Boyer, Duncan Fegredo, Dave Johnson, Kevin Nowlan, Thierry Robin, and Matt Smith.
