= B.P.R.D. Hell on Earth: New World =

- Trade Paperback Cover

Publication information
- Publisher: Dark Horse Comics
- Format: Trade Paperback
- Genre: Action/adventure, horror
- Publication date: August 17, 2011
- Main characters: Kate Corrigan; Ben Daimio; Andrew Devon; Carla Giarocco; Johann Kraus; Panya; Abe Sapien; Daryl Tynon

Creative team
- Created by: Mike Mignola
- Written by: Mike Mignola; John Arcudi
- Artist: Guy Davis
- Letterer: Clem Robins
- Colorist: Dave Stewart
- Editor: Scott Allie

Collected editions
- B.P.R.D. Hell on Earth: New World: ISBN 978-1-59582-707-4

B.P.R.D. Hell on Earth: New World is the first trade paperback collection in the Hell on Earth cycle of the B.P.R.D. series.

== Story ==
=== Chapter 1 ===
1
