= Hellboy: Sword of Storms =

2006 television film directed by Tad Stones

- DVD cover
- Based on: Hellboy by: Mike Mignola
- Screenplay by: Matt Wayne; Tad Stones
- Story by: Mike Mignola; Tad Stones
- Directed by: Phil Weinstein
- Starring: Ron Perlman; Selma Blair; Doug Jones; Peri Gilpin
- Composer: Christopher Drake
- Country of origin: United States
- Original language: English

Production
- Executive producers: Lawrence Gordon; Lloyd Levin; Mike Richardson; Stephen Brown; Morris Berger; John W. Hyde
- Producers: Scott D. Greenberg; Scott Hemming; Sidney Clifton; Guillermo del Toro (creative); Mike Mignola (creative)
- Editors: John Hoyos; Jeffrey Perlmutter
- Running time: 77 minutes
- Production companies: Starz Media; Film Roman; Revolution Studios; Madhouse

Original release
- Release: October 28, 2006

Hellboy: Sword of Storms is a 2006 American animated superhero film based on Mike Mignola's comic book series Hellboy and its 2004 live-action film adaptation. The film was animated by Madhouse, produced by Starz Media, Revolution Studios and Film Roman and directed by Phil Weinstein. The plot is partly based on the Right Hand of Doom storyline from the original comics.

Hellboy: Sword of Storms was released on DVD on October 28, 2006, and aired later that year on Cartoon Network. It was nominated for Outstanding Animated Program (For Programming One Hour or More) at the 59th Primetime Emmy Awards. The first installment in the Hellboy Animated series, it was followed by Hellboy: Blood and Iron, released straight-to-DVD in 2007.

== Plot ==
Liz Sherman and Abe Sapien enter a Mayan temple, where they find Hellboy battling a gigantic zombie bat, and engage its zombie followers. The group are eventually able to defeat their opponents when Liz unleashes her pyrokinetic powers, although she is still unsure of her ability to control those powers.

Meanwhile, Japanese folklore expert Professor Mitsuyasu Sakai obtains an ancient scroll. It tells the myth of two demonic brothers, Thunder and Lightning. Hundreds of years ago, the brothers roamed Japan, unleashing storms on the lands of a Daimyō (lord). In exchange for mercy, the Daimyō promises to give them his beautiful daughter. One of the Daimyō's samurai warriors is in love with the daughter and hides her in a shrine to protect her. Armed with the Sword of Storms, a mystical katana imbued with an ancient spell to defeat Thunder and Lightning, the warrior battles the demons and traps their spirits in the sword. Although his lands and daughter are saved, the Daimyō is displeased because the samurai has broken the Daimyō's promise, a dishonor. In vengeance, the Daimyō summons the gods to turn the warrior to stone and then kills his daughter in the shrine.

In current-day Japan, Professor Sakai is possessed by the spirits of Thunder and Lightning while reading the scroll. The demonic brothers send the professor in search of the mystical sword. When he attacks its current owner, the Bureau for Paranormal Research and Defense is alerted and Hellboy, Kate Corrigan, and a psychic named Russell Thorne are called in to investigate. During the investigation, Hellboy picks up a discarded katana and vanishes to another dimension that is reminiscent of ancient Japan. Hellboy meets a wise kitsune, who tells him that he holds the Sword of Storms and that the goal of his journey lies to the west. Hellboy travels through the alternate universe and learns that he can only return to his own world by breaking the sword, although that will also free the demonic brothers. Along the way, Hellboy encounters several mythical Yōkai, sent by the still-possessed Sakai, who try to steal the sword from him, including the kappa, a trio of rokurokubi, a group of nukekubi, a Jorōgumo, Gashadokuro, tengu, Yomotsu-shikome, and the restless ghost of the Daimyō's daughter. Hellboy is able to outsmart or defeat all of them.

Meanwhile, Abe Sapien and Liz Sherman are called to the sites of disturbing earthquakes and discover that Thunder and Lightning are summoning their brothers, the dragons. They meet the same kitsune who guided Hellboy and are instructed to stop the dragons. A sea-dragon attacks them, but Liz manages to hold it back using her pyrokinetic abilities.

Professor Sakai travels to the shrine where the Daimyō killed his daughter, followed by Kate and Russell who have just survived an attack by several objects from Japanese folklore. At the same time, Hellboy is tricked into smashing the sword against the samurai's stone form, which destroys the sword, releases Thunder and Lightning, frees Professor Sakai, and returns Hellboy to the modern-day shrine. Hellboy eventually traps both spirits in the sword again, which reseals the dragons into the underworld. The ghosts of the daughter and the Daimyō possess Kate and Russell, in order to replay the daughter's execution. Hellboy accidentally frees the ghost of the samurai warrior from its stone form and then convinces the Daimyō to forgive his daughter and the warrior, thereby breaking the cycle of their unending deaths. The spirits depart, thankful to Hellboy and the others for helping them.

== Cast ==
- Ron Perlman – Hellboy
- Selma Blair – Liz Sherman
- Doug Jones – Abe Sapien
- Peri Gilpin – Professor Kate Corrigan
- Dee Bradley Baker – Lightning, Kappa, Pilot, Additional voices
- Phil LaMarr – Bureau of Paranormal Research and Defense Member, Pilot
- Mitchell Whitfield – Russell Thorn
- Gwendoline Yeo – Kitsune
- Liza del Mundo – Additional voices
- Paul Nakauchi – Additional voices
- James Sie – Additional voices
- Kim Mai Guest – Additional voices
- Michael Hagiwara – Additional voices
- Yuriana Kim – Additional voices
- Clyde Kusatsu – Additional voices
- Keith Ferguson – Additional voices

== Crew ==
- Ginny McSwain – Voice Director
- Stephen R. Brown – Producer

== Reception ==
The reaction to the film was generally positive. It scored an 8.7 from IGN. The DVD special features, which include several commentaries and documentaries about the making of the film, were roundly praised. The voiceover work from returning cast members Perlman, Blair, and Jones was well-reviewed, as well as new addition Peri Gilpin as Kate.

== Broadcast dates ==
Sword of Storms made its U.S. television debut on October 28, 2006 on Cartoon Network's Toonami Saturday action block (and aired again on December 30, 2006) and was released on DVD by Anchor Bay Entertainment on February 6, 2007. It aired alongside Hellboy: Blood and Iron on July 19, 2008 to promote the release of Hellboy II: The Golden Army.
