= Hellboy: Wake the Devil =

Comic book series by Mike Mignola

- Cover to the trade paperback Art by Mike Mignola

Publication information
- Publisher: Dark Horse Comics
- Schedule: Monthly
- Format: Mini-series
- Genre: Horror
- Publication date: June - October 1996
- No. of issues: 5

Creative team
- Created by: Mike Mignola
- Written by: Mike Mignola
- Artist(s): Mike Mignola
- Letterer(s): Pat Brosseau
- Colorist(s): James Sinclair
- Editor(s): Scott Allie

Collected editions
- Hellboy: Wake the Devil: ISBN 1-59307-095-0

Hellboy: Wake the Devil is a five-issue comic book mini-series in the Hellboy franchise, conceived and illustrated by Mike Mignola and published by American company Dark Horse Comics. Various elements and sections of plot were later used in the animated film Hellboy: Blood and Iron.

== Plot ==
=== Part One ===
The comic opens on the northern coast of Norway, inside the Arctic Circle, where a Zinco helicopter is landing in front of the castle that was seen at the end of Seed of Destruction. The head of the company, Roderick Zinco, breaks into the castle and is confronted by Karl Kroenen, Ilsa Haupstein and Leopold Kurtz but Zinco explains that he saw Grigori Rasputin on his private beach and left behind the words Ragna Rock and disappeared, Zinco promises them that they can use anything he has.

One year later, in SoHo, New York City the Nazis kill a wax museum curator. At the B.P.R.D. Headquarters in Fairfield, Connecticut, Tom Manning and Kate Corrigan brief the agents about the life of Vladimir Giurescu and the fact that he could never die because he heals himself under the light of a full moon at Castle Giurescu. In 1944, Heinrich Himmler proposed project Vampir Sturm and a Nazi delegation led by Ilsa Haupstein was sent to recruit Giurescu. But Hitler ordered the arrest and execution of the Giurescu family after first meeting Vladimir. They revealed that the museum curator Howard Steinman, whose real name is Hans Ubler, smuggled Giurescu's body out of Germany before his corpse was burnt and that someone could have the intention to take the corpse to Castle Giurescu to re-animate his corpse, but there are three possibilities as to where Castle Giurescu is, so Tom Manning splits them up into three groups. Hellboy on his own, Clark with Abe Sapien, and Bud Waller with Liz Sherman and Leach.

In Romania, Isla Haupstein opens the stolen box with Giurescu's corpse in it and orders the soldiers to take it to a specific room. Meanwhile, in Norway, Kurtz and Kroenen watch Ilsa and it is revealed that they are manufacturing their own army. Back in Romania, the agents are all in a plane where Abe Sapien talks to Hellboy about the involvement of the Ragna Rok Project because he thinks it's worrying Hellboy. Hellboy jumps out the plane with a jetpack which explodes when he tries to click it and Hellboy lands in the same castle that Ilsa Haupstein is in.

=== Part Two ===
Ilsa orders Unmensch, a cyborg Nazi, to kill Hellboy and they fight until they both fall through the floor. A flashback to Tarmagant Island, 1944 shows Rasputin ordering Ilsa, Kroenen and Kurtz to go to Norway. In the present, Rasputin appears and tells her to leave the castle and that the next time she sees Giurescu that he will be young again. In the castle, Hellboy wakes up with the Nazi gone, leaving behind only his metal arm.

In a nearby village, an old man tells his daughter to leave with her children and to never come back and that it is "too late" for him to leave.

Hellboy follows a trace of blood and finds a man eating the Nazi's leg and reveals that he is Vladmir Giurescu's father, and that it is the goddess Hecate who brings Giurescu back to life because Giurescu is her son. When Hellboy asks where Giurescu is, the man refuses to tell him and Hellboy burns him to death. When Hellboy leaves the room he remembers the old man said something about a moon door and sees a door with a moon shape on it, and inside is the box with his corpse in and the three soldier's heads in front of it. But he is surrounded by ravens who turn into the Women of Thessaly and start attacking him.

=== Part Three ===
At Castle Giurescu, Hellboy is shooting the Women of Thessaly as Giurescu comes out of his box. As Hellboy tries to kill him with a stab to the chest, Giurescu turns into a raven. He falls into a stone coffin and ends up underground. Hellboy eventually finds Giurescu is lying on the ground with the knife in his chest, but Giurescu turns into a mass of snakes and escapes. As Hellboy leaves the tomb, Hecate brings Giurescu back to life. Rasputin tells Isla about his life and offers her the chance to be reborn as he was.

In the Ruins of Czege Castle, Liz Sherman, Bud Waller and Leach find a door. Leach, a human metal detector, is able to detect the hinges and open it. They find a huge room with a seemingly lifeless homunculus inside. Liz touches a hole in its chest and is unable to let go, the homunculus coming to life from siphoning her energy. When Bud shoots her arm to free her, he is killed by the startled homunculus who then runs off.

In Norway, Roderick Zinco has a head in a jar, who is revealed to be Professor Herman Von Klempt. Kroenen asked Zinco to find Von Klempt and form an alliance. At the Monastery of St. Bartholomew in Romania, the old man from issue 2 tells his brother, a priest, that the town will go back to its "old ways" because he can sense Giurescu. However, his brother doesn't believe him. Back at Castle Giurescu, Hellboy finds a room full of explosives and sets them to go off in one hour.

=== Part Four ===
As Hellboy is leaving the castle, he encounters Hecate, who is perplexed as to why he helps the mortals while lure him to return to his "old king". He bluntly refuses as they fight, Hecate telling him that he cannot escape his destiny as the harbinger of doom. Hellboy spears her as they smash through a wall to the outside, Hecate's burning body dissolving into snakes as the explosives go off.

Abe Sapien and Clark report back to B.P.R.D. HQ from the ruins of Szentes Castle, telling them they found nothing but see a pillar of smoke from Hellboy's location. They are told to go and find Hellboy.

In Romania, Baba Yaga's servant Koku brings Rasputin an Iron Maiden to initiate Ilsa Haupstein's rebirth. She enters it and is immediately killed. Rasputin tells Koku that he will be back to see Baba Yaga.

Stephen and two other men find Hellboy's body outside the ruins of Castle Giurescu to drive him to the crossroads.

In Norway, Von Klempt tries to tempt Kroenen to join him instead of going along with Rasputin's plans but Kurtz gets angry and tries to kill Von Klempt. Kroenen tries to stop Kurtz and ends up stabbing and killing him.

In Romania, Hellboy is chained to a thick wooden pole. Rasputin tells him that he is there to rot and he leaves him there with the iron maiden.

=== Part Five ===
Abe Sapien and Clark land in the Romanian village to discover all the houses boarded up with crosses painted on the doors and windows. They enter a church where Stephen's brother stands at the end of the church with Hellboy's signal belt in his hand. He is unresponsive and when Clark touches his shoulder, the priest's head falls off and the pair fall through the floor. Clark lands on long metal spikes and is impaled through the chest. Abe falls to the ground, where Rasputin confronts him and tells him that he will be speared through the chest as well. The Priest's severed head speaks, saying, "Abraham Sapien. Do you hear... sunken bells are tolling for thee. Out of caverns of num-yabisc, dark and terrible deep, the ocean is calling her children home."

At the crossroads, Hellboy is still chained to the thick wooden pole as he is confronted by a fully re-animated Vladmir Giurescu on horseback, breaking free and killing Giurescu. But Giurescu is revealed to have possessed a fragment of Hecate's soul that enters the iron maiden, reshaping it and Ilsa's corpse into a semblance of her previous form as she brutally attacks Hellboy before eating him. Hellboy's horns fully re-grow and he sees the Ogdru-Jahad, but he again refuses to help end the world and snaps his horns. He appears back at the crossroads where Kate Corrigan finds him and tells him what happened to the other teams.

In Norway, Rasputin confronts Von Klempt, Kroenen, and Zinco and temporarily blinds Zinco who accidentally presses a button that blows up the whole castle. In a helicopter above Romania, Hellboy is told that there was no sign of the iron maiden. At the end of the issue, it is revealed that the skeleton of Vladmir Giurescu was in the process of being moved to BPRD HQ, but while it was temporarily placed in storage at the Bucharest airport it disappeared and has never been recovered. It is also revealed that the head of Father Nicholas Budenz never spoke again but continued to be the focus of poltergeist activities, including sudden temperature drops and the levitation of objects for weeks.

=== Epilogue ===
At the World Tree, Yggdrasil, Baba Yaga tells Rasputin that he has failed and cannot be a god, and that he has to stay with her. He says that he will go on and continue to try to make himself a god.

== Collected editions ==
It was collected as the second Hellboy trade paperback with a new epilogue:

- Wake the Devil (5-issue mini-series, 1997, Dark Horse Comics, tpb, 144 pages, 1997, ISBN 1-56971-226-3, 2004, ISBN 1-59307-095-0}

== Awards ==
- 1997: Mignola won the "Best Writer/Artist: Drama" Eisner Award, for Wake the Devil
