= Hellboy: Blood and Iron =

2007 second in the Hellboy Animated series directed by Tad Stones Victor Cook

- DVD cover
- Based on: Hellboy by: Mike Mignola
- Screenplay by: Kevin Hopps
- Story by: Mike Mignola; Tad Stones
- Directed by: Victor Cook
- Starring: Ron Perlman; Selma Blair; Doug Jones; John Hurt; Cree Summer; Peri Gilpin; Kath Soucie; Jim Cummings
- Composer: Christopher Drake
- Country of origin: United States
- Original language: English

Production
- Executive producers: Lawrence Gordon; Mike Richardson; Lloyd Levin; Stephen Brown; Morris Berger; John W. Hyde
- Producers: Scott D. Greenberg; Scott Hemming; Sidney Clifton; Guillermo del Toro (creative); Mike Mignola (creative)
- Editor: Matt Steinauer
- Running time: 75 minutes
- Production companies: Starz Media; Revolution Studios; Film Roman; Madhouse

Original release
- Network: Cartoon Network
- Release: March 10, 2007

Hellboy: Blood and Iron is a 2007 American animated superhero film based on Mike Mignola's comic book series Hellboy and its 2004 live-action film adaptation. It is the second film in the Hellboy Animated series (the first being Hellboy: Sword of Storms), written by Tad Stones and Mike Mignola. It first aired on March 10, 2007 on Cartoon Network, and aired again on July 19, 2008 to promote the release of Hellboy II: The Golden Army, and was released on DVD by Anchor Bay Entertainment on June 12, 2007. The film's storyline is based in part upon the Hellboy: Wake the Devil storyline from the original comics.

The title is a reference to Otto von Bismarck's famous "Blood and Iron speech".

Also included on the DVD is the short film Iron Shoes, which is based on the Hellboy story of the same name. The Iron Shoes demon is voiced by Dan Castellaneta.

== Plot ==
In 1939, shown in a series of flashbacks played in reverse chronological order, Professor Trevor Bruttenholm investigates a series of murders in Eastern Europe. Erzsebet Ondrushko, a vampire who bathed in the blood of innocents to stay young, was responsible. She had sold her soul to the Queen of Witches, the goddess Hecate, and most recently kidnapped the fiancée of one of the townsmen. When the search party, including the local priest, Father Lupescu, confronts Erzsebet, all but Bruttenholm are slain, and the young man must face the vampire alone. He tricks her into the sunlight, effectively destroying her, but her ashes manage to seal themselves inside a protective iron maiden.

In the present day, an elderly Bruttenholm, overcome with memories of his encounter with Erzsebet, takes a particular interest in a new case reported in the Hamptons on Long Island. A haunting has been reported in a mansion recently purchased by celebrity billionaire Oliver Trumbolt, a friend of a U.S. Senator with hands deep in the BPRD's budget and considered a low priority due to the Bureau considering it nothing more than a publicity stunt. Bruttenholm insists that their most advanced team should go: Liz Sherman, Abe Sapien, Hellboy, and junior agent Sydney Leach as well as himself (to everyone's surprise). Bruttenholm does not explain his motives at first.

The BPRD team arrives at Trumbolt's site and sets up to investigate the haunting. Despite a few open windows, a creepy lifelike replica of Erzsebet, artifacts from her castle, and an old, suspiciously familiar-looking groundskeeper, everything seems normal until night falls and they each encounter strange ghostly apparitions, culminating in dozens of spirits of Erzsebet's former victims suddenly manifesting with warnings to leave. Excited that he may have found a goldmine, Trumbolt ignores the professor's warnings and is attacked.

Using his abilities to detect metal, Leach finds a secret passageway through the house's cellar, inadvertently coming across Trumbolt's body, drained of blood. The blood has been placed in a bathtub, apparently for Erzsebet's revival. Bruttenholm and Liz head for the gardens to stop the two immortal witches who trained Erzsebet from completing her resurrection. The aged groundskeeper, actually Father Lupescu who is in thrall to the vampire, is transformed into a werewolf by the harpies and sent to attack the team. Abe is knocked out and taken by the witches, (who assume the form of harpies) to be brutally tortured while Hellboy fights the werewolf, ultimately killing it.

Liz and Bruttenholm are attacked, first by demonic wolves to delay them from stopping the ritual, then by Erzsebet in a restored but withered body, who knocks Liz out, smashes Hellboy through a hole in the courtyard, and takes Bruttenholm back to the mansion. Erzsebet bathes in Trumbolt's blood and rejuvenates herself, but she begins to wither and decay again – Bruttenholm had already poisoned the blood with Holy Water. He stakes the vampire through the heart, and she turns back to dust. Freed from their torment, the spirits of the house depart in peace, including Father Lupescu.

Meanwhile, under the mansion, Hellboy meets Hecate, who is perplexed as to why he helps the mortals, and tries to lure him to the dark side. He bluntly refuses again and again, battling Hecate's snakes as he tries to re-enter the mansion. Erzsebet's death further enrages Hecate, who possesses the iron maiden, reshapes it into a semblance of her true form, and brutally attacks Hellboy. Abe escapes the harpies, after which they find Hecate fighting Hellboy; one is killed by Hecate's thrashing tail and the other flies away. Leach, Liz, and Abe attempt to help Hellboy stop the goddess, but are unsuccessful. A badly wounded Hellboy realizes Hecate's weakness is the sun; he lures her outside, forcing her back into the darkness of her own realm, defeated. The film ends with Bruttenholm, watching over Hellboy's recovery, sitting next to him.

== Cast ==
- Ron Perlman – Hellboy
- Doug Jones – Abe Sapien
- Selma Blair – Liz Sherman
- John Hurt – Trevor Bruttenholm
- Rob Paulsen – Sydney Leach; Anna's Fiancé
- Peri Gilpin – Kate Corrigan
- Jim Cummings – Tom Manning
- James Arnold Taylor – Father Lupescu; Young Trevor Bruttenholm
- J. Grant Albrecht – Oliver Trumbolt
- Cree Summer – Hecate
- Kath Soucie – Erzebet Ondrushko
- Dee Dee Rescher – Harpy-Hag #1
- Grey DeLisle – Harpy-Hag #2; Anna

== Crew ==
- Ginny McSwain – Voice Director
