= Doug Jones (actor) =

American actor (born 1960)

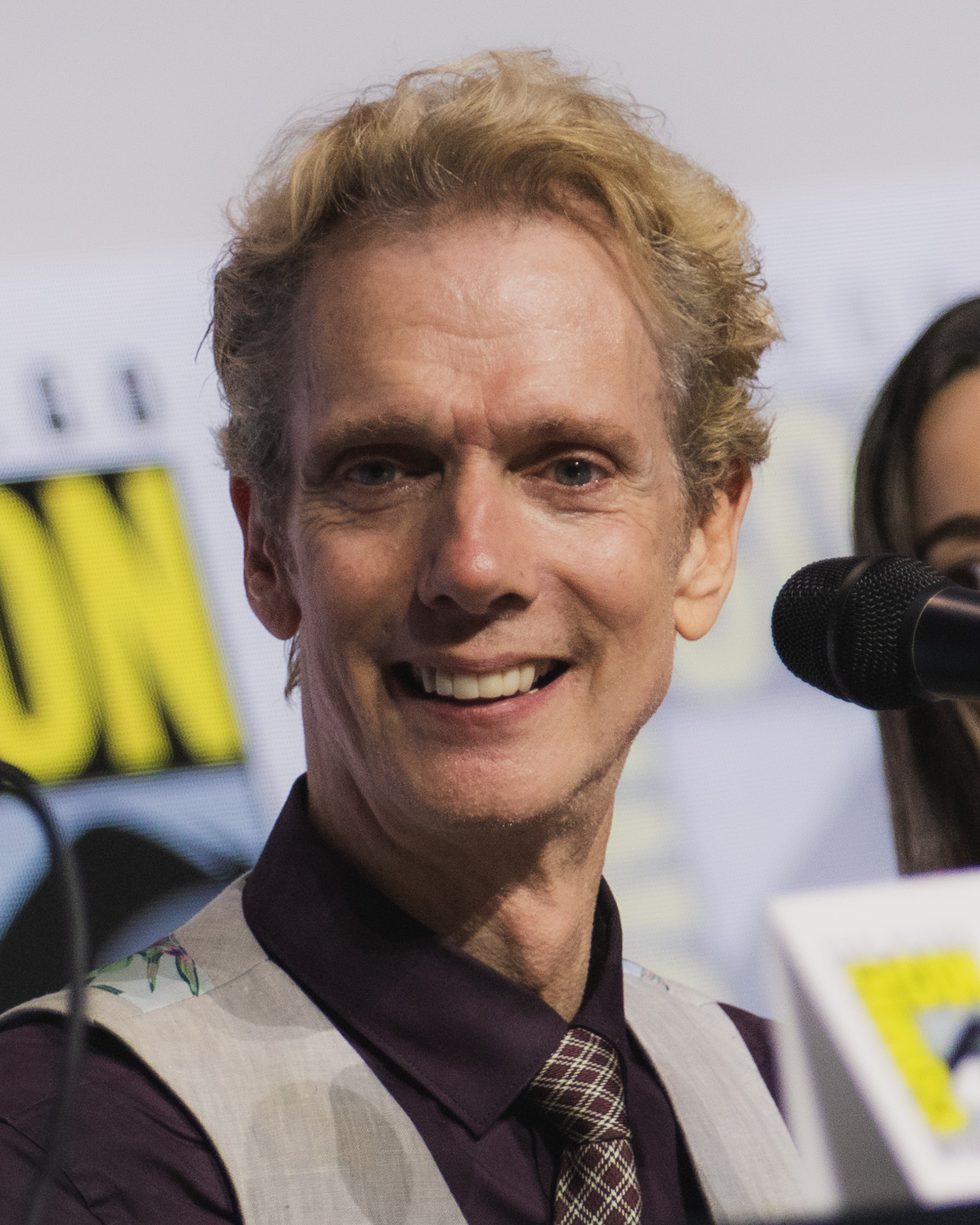
- Jones at the 2026 San Diego Comic-Con
- Born: May 24, 1960 (age 66); Indianapolis, Indiana, U.S.
- Education: Ball State University
- Occupations: Actor; contortionist; mime artist
- Years active: 1985–present
- Spouse: Laurie Pontoni (m. 1984)

Doug Jones (born May 24, 1960) is an American actor, contortionist, and mime artist. He is best known for portraying non-human creatures, usually via heavy make-up and visual effects. He is well known for his collaborations with acclaimed filmmaker Guillermo del Toro, most notably as Abe Sapien in Hellboy (2004) and its 2008 sequel, the Faun and the Pale Man in Pan's Labyrinth (2006), and the Amphibian Man in The Shape of Water (2017).

Jones' other film credits include Hocus Pocus (1993) and its 2022 sequel, Hocus Pocus 2; Fantastic Four: Rise of the Silver Surfer (2007); Absentia (2011); Ouija: Origin of Evil (2016); and The Bye Bye Man (2017). His longest-running television role was as Saru in Star Trek: Discovery (2017–2024). He also appeared in Falling Skies (2013–2015), del Toro's The Strain (2014–2016), and What We Do in the Shadows (2019–2024).

== Early life and education ==
Doug Jones was born on May 24, 1960, in Indianapolis, the youngest of four brothers.

He attended Bishop Chatard High School. He graduated from Ball State University, where he parlayed his background as a mime into portraying the school mascot "Charlie Cardinal."

== Career ==
Jones started his career in the television and movie industry as a 1980s advertising character, "Mac Tonight". He worked as a contortionist, saying, "You'd be surprised how many times that comes into play in commercials. They'll want somebody to hold a box of Tide funny or something. I once squished into a box for a commercial for relaxed fit jeans." In 1994, he appeared in an episode of Unsolved Mysteries as Gordon Page Jr., a young man with autism who disappeared from a treatment center in 1991.

Although known mostly for his work under prosthetic makeup, such as the zombie William "Billy" Butcherson in the Walt Disney Pictures Halloween film Hocus Pocus, or the lead spy Morlock in the 2002 remake of the 1960 film The Time Machine, he has also performed without prosthetics in such films as Adaptation, Mystery Men, and Batman Returns, and indie projects such as Stefan Haves' Stalled, AntiKaiser Productions' Three Lives, Phil Donlon's A Series of Small Things, and as Cesare in David Fisher's 2005 remake of the 1920 silent classic The Cabinet of Dr. Caligari.

Jones played Abe Sapien in Hellboy; the voice was performed by an uncredited David Hyde Pierce in the first film, but Jones's voice was used in the sequel. Explaining the challenge of working so often in rubber suits and prosthetics, he notes, "I have to make that a part of my being and my physicality and again, acting is a full-body experience and that's a part of it when you're doing a costumed character."

In 2005, he worked again with Mexican director Guillermo del Toro, starring as the Faun in del Toro's multiple-Academy Award-winning Spanish-language fantasy/horror project Pan's Labyrinth. He also has a secondary role in the film as the Pale Man, a gruesome creature with a penchant for eating children. Working once more under heavy prosthetics in both roles, he was also required to learn large amounts of dialogue in Spanish, although ultimately his voice was redubbed by Pablo Adan. That same year also brought success for The Cabinet of Dr. Caligari, the film receiving three awards at the Screamfest Horror Festival in Los Angeles, including the Audience Choice Award.

In 2006, Jones appeared in the feature films The Benchwarmers and Lady in the Water, and reprised his role as Abe Sapien by voicing the character in the new Hellboy Animated television project, recording two 75-minute animated films.

In February 2007, Jones's likeness was used for Nvidia's "Human Head" tech demo. In June 2007, he appeared in Fantastic Four: Rise of the Silver Surfer as the Silver Surfer, though Laurence Fishburne provided the character's voice. He reprised his role as Abe Sapien in Hellboy II: The Golden Army, once more under the direction of del Toro, for which he provided both the voice and body performance. He played two other roles in the film: the Angel of Death and the Chamberlain, both under heavy prosthetics. In 2009, del Toro announced on BBC Radio that Jones would be playing the monster in his upcoming version of Frankenstein.

In 2007, Jones was disappointed to learn that his voice part of the Silver Surfer had been dubbed by another actor (Fishburne) when the film was released. Upon inquiry, he determined that studio pressure had been imposed in order to add more "names" to the movie. As Jones gained greater clout in the industry, he eventually was able to add a clause to his contracts ensuring that no English dialogue of his characters would be dubbed. Roles that include other languages may be dubbed, however. This came into play in Pan's Labyrinth – Jones learned enough Spanish to voice his characters. Still, the decision was made to use a native speaker in order to access the language's nuances adequately.

Jones starred as himself in Sockbaby 4, the fourth installment of the Internet martial arts comedy series Sockbaby.

Jones appeared in the French-language film Gainsbourg (Vie héroïque), written and directed by French comic book author Joann Sfar and produced by Universal Europe. Jones played La Gueule ("The Mug"), the grotesque fantasy muse and malicious doppelganger who teases, guides, and accompanies Serge Gainsbourg throughout his life. He was fitted with prosthetics designed and created by the Academy Award-winning Spanish FX shop DDT Efectos Especiales, with whom he had already worked on Pan's Labyrinth; the FX technicians requested specifically that Jones be given the role of the Mug creature, due to his ability to perform (without complaining) with heavy prosthetics and elaborate special effects. As in Pan's Labyrinth, Jones performed his lines phonetically, this time speaking in French; his voice was redubbed by Éric Elmosnino, who also played Gainsbourg. Director Joann Sfar liked Jones's speech patterns so much that he asked Elmosnino to mimic them when he performed the creature's lines. The film was released in France on January 20, 2010.

In January 2010, Jones signed a book deal with Medallion Press to model a nonfiction comedic coffee table book called Mime Very Own Book, co-authored by Adam Mock and Scott Allen Perry and photographed by Eric Curtis. The book was due for publication in December 2011.

Jones plays Dr. Henry Vataber in the web series Universal Dead. In late June 2010, it was announced that Universal Dead would be made into a feature film. He appeared in the independent film The Candy Shop, a "modern fairy tale" shedding light upon child sex trafficking, created by the American film studio Whitestone Pictures.

Jones played the "Operator", a fictional entity based on the Internet myth known as the "Slender Man", in Always Watching: A Marble Hornets Story, a 2015 film adaptation of the popular Marble Hornets YouTube series.

Jones was cast as Saru, a non-human Kelpien in Star Trek: Discovery, which premiered on September 24, 2017. That same year, Jones reunited with Guillermo del Toro, this time in a romantic lead role, the Amphibian Man (the "asset") in the Academy Award-winning The Shape of Water.

In 2022, Jones reprised his role as Billy Butcherson in Hocus Pocus 2.

== Personal life ==
Jones describes himself as a "dyed-in-the-wool Christian from the Midwest", to the point that he was initially apprehensive about his role in Hellboy due to the titular character's demonic nature.

In 1984, Jones married his college sweetheart, Laurie Pontoni. They relocated to Los Angeles in 1985 to further his acting career.

== Filmography ==
=== Film ===
Year	Title	Role	Notes	Ref.
1987	The Dark Tower	Ghost	Uncredited	
1987	The Newlydeads	Tim		
1990	Night Angel	Ken		
1991	Carnal Crimes	Lang	Direct-to-video	
1992	Batman Returns	Thin Clown		
1993	Hocus Pocus	William "Billy" Butcherson		
1993	Magic Kid	Clown in Office	Direct-to-video	
1995	Tank Girl	Additional Ripper		
1996	Galgameth	Big Galgy		
1997	Mimic	Long John #2		
1997	Warriors of Virtue	Yee	Voiced by Doug Parker	
1998	Bug Buster	Mother Bug		
1998	Denial	Ghost	Direct-to-video	
1999	Mystery Men	Pencilhead		
1999	Three Kings	Dead Iraqi Soldier		
2000	Stalled	Len		
2000	The Adventures of Rocky and Bullwinkle	FBI Agent – Carrot		
2000	Jack Frost 2: Revenge of the Mutant Killer Snowman	Dave	Direct-to-video	
2001	Steven Spielberg's Movie	Donald Columbus	Short film	
2001	Monkeybone	Yeti		
2002	Adaptation	Augustus Margary		
2002	Men in Black II	Joey		
2002	Side Effects	Seth	Short film	
2002	The Time Machine	Spy Morlock		
2003	Stuck on You	Space Alien #2		
2004	Three Lives	Mysterious Caller/Mortician	Short film	
2004	Hellboy	Abe Sapien	Voiced by David Hyde Pierce	
2005	The Cabinet of Dr. Caligari	Cesare		
2005	Doom	Carmack Imp / Sewer Imp		
2005	A Series of Small Things	The Homeless Man	Short film	
2006	The Benchwarmers	Number 7 Robot	Voice	
2006	Lady in the Water	Tartutic #4		
2006	Pan's Labyrinth	The Faun/The Pale Man	Voiced by Pablo Adán	
2006	Hellboy: Sword of Storms	Abe Sapien	Voice; Direct-to-video	
2006	Nora Breaks Free	Yoga Instructor	Short film	
2007	Carnies	Ratcatcher		
2007	Hellboy: Blood and Iron	Abe Sapien	Voice; Direct-to-video	
2007	Fantastic Four: Rise of the Silver Surfer	Norrin Radd / Silver Surfer	Voiced by Laurence Fishburne	
2007	The Wager	Peter Barrett		
2008	Quarantine	Thin Infected Man		
2008	Sockbaby	Himself	Short film	
2008	Hellboy II: The Golden Army	Abe Sapien/Angel of Death/The Chamberlin		
2008	The Job	Office Manager	Short film	
2009	My Name Is Jerry	Jerry		
2009	Pie & Coffee	Homeless Man	Short film	
2009	Super Capers	Special Agent Smith #1		
2009	The Butterfly Circus	Otto	Short film	
2010	The Cure	Samuel Bainer	Short film	
2010	Gainsbourg: A Heroic Life	La Gueule		
2010	Legion	Ice Cream Man		
2010	Cyrus: Mind of a Serial Killer	Dr. Arthur		
2010	Sudden Death!	Jonathan Wright	Short film	
2010	Quantum Quest: A Cassini Space Odyssey	Zero/Razer	Voice	
2010	The Candy Shop	Candy Shop Owner	Short film	
2010	Absentia	Walter Lambert		
2010	Greyscale	Jamison		
2010	Rock Jocks	Smoking Jesus		
2011	End of the Road (1,2,3...Scream)	Randolph		
2011	The Tomorrow Machine	Ben	Short film	
2012	It's Alive	Monster	Short film	
2012	White Room: 20B3	Fyn-Ke'al	Short film	
2012	Men In Suits	Himself	Documentary	
2012	The Watch	Hero Alien		
2012	Saint Alex	Mr. Vanderplook	Short film	
2012	John Dies at the End	Robert North		
2013	Raze	Joseph		
2013	Hookah	Allen	Short film	
2013	First Impressions	Suited Man	Short film	
2013	Dust of War	Jebediah Strumm		
2013	Innocent Blood	Carl Grierr		
2013	Cruel Will	Adrian		
2014	Love in the Time of Monsters	Dr. Lincoln		
2014	Everlast	Suited Man	Short film	
2015	Always Watching: A Marble Hornets Story	The Operator		
2015	Crimson Peak	Ghosts of Edith's Mother/Lady Beatrice Sharpe		
2016	The Midnight Man	Vick		
2016	Ouija: Origin of Evil	Ghoul Marcus		
2016	Kiss the Devil in the Dark	Terrance/Dagon	Short film	
2016	Han Solo: A Smuggler's Trade	Gyorsho	Short film	
2017	The Bye Bye Man	The Bye Bye Man		
2017	We’ve Forgotten More Than We Ever Knew...		Independent movie	
2017	The Terror of Hallow's Eve	Scarecrow/The Trickster		
2017	The Danger Element	Doctor Elymas		
2017	The Shape of Water	Amphibian Man		
2017	Island in the Sun	Ranger	Short film	
2017	5th Passenger	Langdon		
2018	Gehenna: Where Death Lives	Creepy Old Man		
2019	Beneath the Leaves	James Whitley		
2021	Battle In Space: The Armada Attacks	The Sycophant		
2022	Hocus Pocus 2	William "Billy" Butcherson		
2023	Nosferatu: A Symphony of Horror	Count Orlok		
2024	Space Command Redemption	Dor Neven		
2024	Down Below	Lester		
2024	Operation Taco Gary's	Elder		
2026	The Remedy	Leif Johansen		
2026	Remain Calm	Grin Man	Short film	
TBA	The Weight of Darkness	John Gatlin	Filming	
TBA	The Weeping	TBA		
TBA	Horrified	TBA	Filming	
TBA	Return of the Living Dead Sequel	TBA	Announced	

=== Television ===
Year	Title	Role	Notes	Ref.
1991	In Living Color	Mime	Episode: "#2.24"	
1993	Tales from the Crypt	Contortionist	Episode: "Food for Thought"	
1993	Silk Stalkings	Artie	Episode: "Love Never Dies"	
1994	The Young Indiana Jones Chronicles	Slapstick Actor	Episode: "Indiana Jones and Hollywood Follies"	
1996	Bone Chillers	Mummy	Episode: "Mummy Dearest"	
1997	Unhappily Ever After	Fake Kramer	Episode: "Sternberg"	
1997	The Weird Al Show	Contortionist #2	4 episodes	
1998	The Outer Limits	Elder Alien / Alien #1 / Alien / Alien Doctor	3 episodes	
1998	Kenan & Kel	Patrick	Episode: "Attack of the Bug Men"	
1999	G vs E	Herb	Episode: "Evilator"	
1999	Buffy the Vampire Slayer	Lead Gentleman	Episode: "Hush"	
2000	Party of Five	Minister	Episode: "Blast from the Past"	
2000	The Darkling	Shadow Master	Television film	
2001	Unsolved Mysteries	Gordon Page Jr.	Episode: "#488"	
2002	CSI: Crime Scene Investigation	Grinder	Episode: "Revenge is Best Served Cold"	
2003	The Guardian	Micah Oakley	Episode: "Believe"	
2004	Rock Me Baby	Auggie the Octopus	Episode: "I Love You, You Don't Love Me"	
2004	Significant Others	Waiter	Episode: "A Date, Fate and Jail Bait"	
2005, 2008	Criminal Minds	Domino Thacker / Beanie	2 episodes	
2007	The Dukes of Hazzard: The Beginning	Patron	Television film	
2008	Fear Itself	Grady Edlund	Episode: "Skin & Bones"	
2010	Battle Jitni: The Danger Element	Doctor Elymas	Television film	
2010	Nick Swardson's Pretend Time	Gay Robot	6 episodes	
2012–2013	The Neighbors	Dominique Wilkins	6 episodes	
2013–2015	Falling Skies	Cochise	28 episodes	
2013	Comedy Bang! Bang!	Future Man	Episode: "Gillian Jacobs Wears a Red Dress with Sail Boats"	
2013	Sons of Anarchy	Corrections Officer Crane	Episode: "The Mad King"	
2014	Teen Wolf	William Barrow	Episode: "Galvanize"	
2014–2016	The Strain	The Ancient / The Master	6 episodes	
2015	Arrow	Jake Simmons / Deathbolt	Episode: "Broken Arrow"	
2015	The Flash	Jake Simmons / Deathbolt	Episode: "Rogue Air"	
2015	Z Nation	Dan Scully	Episode: "Roswell"	
2015	The Ultimate Legacy	Hawthorne	Television film	
2017	Nazareth	President Glade	Television film	
2017–2024	Star Trek: Discovery	Ambassador Saru / Saru (mirror)	58 episodes Saturn Award for Best Supporting Actor in Streaming Presentation (2019); Nominated—Saturn Award for Best Supporting Actor on Television (2018)	
2017–2018	After Trek	Himself	3 episodes	
2018	Star Trek: Short Treks	Saru	Episode: "The Brightest Star"	
2019–2024	The Ready Room	Himself	5 episodes	
2019–2024	What We Do in the Shadows	Baron Afanas	15 episodes	
2019	Better Things	Himself / Monster	2 episodes	
2019	I Am	Principal	Episode: "Pilot"	
2020	Space Command	Dor Neven	3 episodes	
2020	DuckTales	Wereduck / Demonic Clown	Voice; Episode: "The Trickening!"	
2026	The Boulet Brothers' Dragula	Himself	Guest judge; season 7, episode 2: "Circus of Screams"	

=== Web series ===
Year	Title	Role	Notes	Ref.
2009	Angel of Death	Dr. Rankin	10 episodes	
2010	Universal Dead	Dr. Vataber	3 episodes	
2011	Fallout: Nuka Break	Mayor Conners	3 episodes	
2011	Dragon Age: Redemption	Saarebas	3 episodes	
2011	The Guild	Gerald	2 episodes	
2012	League of STEAM	Theodore Marshall	Episode: "Dining with the Devil"	
2012–2013	Research.	Denny	8 episodes	
2013	The Blockbuster Buster	Himself	Episode: "Rocky and Bullwinkle"	
2013, 2018	Adopted	Lloyd Adams	4 episodes	
2015	Hell's Kitty	Father Damien	2 episodes	
2015	Murder?	Narrator / Eric	2 episodes	
2016	Screen Junkies Movie Fights	Himself	1 episode	
2016	Han Solo: A Smuggler's Trade – A Star Wars Fan Film	Gyorsho	1 episode	
2017–2018	Automata	Carl Swangee	Voice; 5 episodes	
2021	Batman: Dying Is Easy	Riddler/Edward Nigma	Fan film	
2023	Star Trek: Very Short Treks	Saru	Voice, 2 episodes	

=== Video games ===
Year	Title	Voice role	Notes	Ref.
2007	Fantastic Four: Rise of the Silver Surfer	Silver Surfer		
2008	Hellboy: The Science of Evil	Abe Sapien		

=== Music videos ===
Year	Title	Artist	Role	Ref.
1998	"I Don't Like the Drugs (But the Drugs Like Me)"	Marilyn Manson	Townsperson	
1999	"All Star"	Smash Mouth	Pencilhead	

== Awards and nominations ==
Year	Award	Category	Work	Result
2008	Scream Awards	Best Supporting Actor	Hellboy II: The Golden Army	Nominated
2009	Fangoria Chainsaw Awards	Best Supporting Actor	Hellboy II: The Golden Army	Won
2009	Fangoria Chainsaw Awards	Fangoria Horror Hall of Fame	—	Won
2018	Saturn Awards	Best Supporting Actor on Television	Star Trek: Discovery	Nominated
2019	Saturn Awards	Best Supporting Actor on Television	Star Trek: Discovery	Won
2021	Saturn Awards	Best Supporting Actor on Television	Star Trek: Discovery	Won
