= Hellboy Animated =

Animated films

- Franchise logo, which has "Animated" added below for this series.
- Based on: Hellboy by: Mike Mignola
- Screenplay by: Matt Wayne; Tad Stones
- Story by: Mike Mignola; Tad Stones
- Directed by: Phil Weinstein
- Starring: Ron Perlman; Selma Blair; Doug Jones; Peri Gilpin; John Hurt; Cree Summer; Kath Soucie; Jim Cummings; Dan Castellaneta
- Composer: Christopher Drake
- Country of origin: United States
- Original language: English

Production
- Executive producers: Lawrence Gordon; Lloyd Levin; Mike Richardson; Stephen Brown; Morris Berger; John W. Hyde
- Producers: Scott D. Greenberg; Scott Hemming; Sidney Clifton; Guillermo del Toro (creative); Mike Mignola (creative)
- Editors: John Hoyos; Jeffrey Perlmutter
- Running time: 77 minutes
- Production companies: Starz Media; Film Roman; Revolution Studios; Madhouse

Original release
- Release: October 28, 2006 – March 10, 2007

Hellboy Animated is an American straight-to-DVD anime-inspired superhero film series based upon the Hellboy comic books by Mike Mignola. Both films are anthologies and contain the full-length titles named Sword of Storms and Blood and Iron, received the signature of Mike Mignola and Guillermo del Toro.

== Production ==
Like the live-action films, it was co-produced by Revolution Studios. The animation was done by Japanese animation studio Madhouse. Both films were distributed by Anchor Bay Entertainment, instead of Sony Pictures (first film), Universal Studios (second film), and Lawrence Gordon Productions (both live-action films). A third film was being planned but was never greenlit. Both films were re-released in Ultra HD Blu-ray as a double feature by Lionsgate Home Entertainment on April 12, 2019.

== Cast ==
Ron Perlman, who played Hellboy in the live-action films, reprises his role in the animated version. Selma Blair and John Hurt also reprise their roles from the film Liz Sherman and Professor Trevor Bruttenholm, respectively. The voice of Abe Sapien is Doug Jones, who played Abe in prosthetic work in the live-action movies but did not provide the voice for the first film (Abe's vocals for that film were done by an uncredited David Hyde Pierce). He did, however, voice the character in the second film. Kate Corrigan is voiced by Peri Gilpin. Music is by Christopher Drake.

== Films ==
=== Sword of Storms ===
In Sword of Storms (2006), Hellboy and Kate Corrigan are dispatched to Japan to solve the mystery of a professor possessed by the Japanese demons Thunder and Lightning. The demons wish to get their hands on a powerful haunted sword, which will free them, and allow them to unleash their brothers and destroy the world. While Hellboy is sent into an alternate dimension, facing Yokai on the way, his B.P.R.D. teammates, Abe Sapien and Liz Sherman, try to stop one of the Dragons on the first wave of the coming chaos.

=== Blood and Iron ===
Hellboy: Blood and Iron (2007) deals with Professor Trevor Bruttenholm's experience with a vampiress (the blood countess) in 1934 and the present day. Hellboy also faces off against Hecate.

== Short films ==
=== Iron Shoes ===
This short film was included as a bonus feature on the DVD for Hellboy: Blood and Iron.

=== The Dark Below ===
This short film was released in 2010 on various streaming services, with Hellboy voiced by Zebulon Pike.

== Comics ==
As with the DC animated universe's spin-off comic books, Dark Horse released three volumes under the Hellboy Animated range. These continued the adventures of the animated characters.

- Hellboy Animated:
  - The Black Wedding (80 pages, January 2007, ISBN 1-59307-700-9) contains:
    - "The Black Wedding" (written by Jim Pascoe with art by Rick Lacy)
    - "Pyramid of Death" (written by Tad Stones with art by Fabio Laguna)
  - Judgment Bell (80 pages, June 2007, ISBN 1-59307-799-8) contains:
    - "The Judgment Bell" (written by Jim Pascoe with art by Rick Lacy)
    - "The Menace of the Mechanical Monster" (written and drawn by Tad Stones)
  - The Menagerie (80 pages, December 2007, ISBN 1-59307-861-7) contains:
    - "The Menagerie" (written by Jason Hall with art by Rick Lacy)
    - "Small Victories" (written by Nate Piekos with art by Fabio Laguna)

Additionally, a minicomic titled Phantom Limbs (written by Jim Pascoe with art by Rick Lacy) was included with the DVD of Sword of Storms. Another minicomic, The Yearning (written by Jim Pascoe with art by Ben Stenbeck) was included with the DVD of Blood & Iron.

== Merchandise ==
Gentle Giant Ltd, famed for its statues, has been given the license for the Hellboy Animated action figures. A first-look Hellboy figure shrink-wrapped to a copy of the Blood and Iron DVD was released as a Best Buy exclusive.

== See also ==
- Hellboy (franchise)
