= Verkh-Yusva =

Verkh-Yusva Верх-Юсьва
- Selo
- Location within Perm Krai Location within Russia
- Coordinates: 58°50′N 54°39′E
- Country: Russia
- Region: Perm Krai
- District: Kudymkarsky District
- Time zone: UTC+5:00

Verkh-Yusva (Russian: Верх-Юсьва) is a rural locality (a selo) in Leninskoye Rural Settlement, Kudymkarsky District, Perm Krai, Russia. The population was 733 as of 2010. There are 24 streets.

== Geography ==
Verkh-Yusva is located 25 km south of Kudymkar (the district's administrative centre) by road. Panya is the nearest rural locality.
