= Jim O'Brien (reporter) =

Philadelphia weatherman and newscaster (1939-1983)

- Born: James Franklin Oldham; November 20, 1939; Belmont, Texas, U.S.
- Died: September 25, 1983 (aged 43) near Gilbertsville, Pennsylvania, U.S.
- Education: Baylor University
- Occupations: Television newscaster, weather reporter and presenter, Disc jockey
- Years active: 1970–1973 (radio); 1973–1983 (television)
- Spouse: Sandra Jo Hauck (div. 1969)
- Children: 2, including Peri Gilpin
- Awards: Broadcast Pioneers of Philadelphia Hall of Fame (posthumous, 1997)

James Franklin Oldham, better known as Jim O'Brien (November 20, 1939 – September 25, 1983), was an American newscaster. He was a member of the WPVI-TV Channel 6 Action News team, which became the highest-rated television news team in the Philadelphia metropolitan area during the late 1970s and early 1980s.

Employed initially as the sports anchor and then the weather anchor at WPVI, he was subsequently chosen to co-anchor the 12:00 p.m. and 5:00 p.m. newscasts, and also hosted the local edition of Dialing for Dollars and the weekend magazine show Primetime.

Following his death during a skydiving accident in 1983, O'Brien was described by Clark DeLeon of The Philadelphia Inquirer as follows:

"In 10 years on local television, Jim O'Brien redefined the word 'personality.' He was without a doubt the most-liked man in Philadelphia. There's no one else even in the running. He took the intimate medium of television and made it even more intimate, while remaining a professional the entire time."

== Early life and education ==
O'Brien was born as James Franklin Oldham in Galveston, Texas on November 20, 1939, James F. Oldham was a son of William Howell Oldham (1905-1975) and Frances Catherine (Sodich) Oldham (1914-2013). He was raised on a small farm in the Fairbanks section of Houston. He attended Cypress-Fairbanks High School, where he was president of his sophomore class and was named "most handsome," "most popular," and "Mr. Sportsmanship" during his junior and senior years. He was also the school's running back on its football team, and was named to the All-District team.

According to his daughter, Peri, her father initially wished to become a pastor and was a theologian who studied at Baylor University. Oldham subsequently adopted the name "Jim O'Brien" during his transition to a career in the radio and television broadcast industry

== Career ==
After short stints at radio stations KHJ in Los Angeles and WOR-FM in New York City, O'Brien relocated to Philadelphia in 1970, where he became a disc jockey at WFIL.

Sometime in 1971 or 1972, he joined the WPVI-TV Channel 6 Action News team as a sports anchor. He soon became the weatherman, and eventually co-anchored the 12:00 p.m. and 5:00 p.m. newscasts, the local edition of Dialing for Dollars, and the weekend magazine show Prime Time.

== Death and funeral ==
O'Brien had two favorite hobbies: motorcycle riding and skydiving. While skydiving on September 25, 1983 at the United Parachute Club near Gilbertsville, Pennsylvania, he and another skydiver deployed their main parachutes. During their descent, under their open parachutes, the two collided, and their parachutes became entangled. After they tried unsuccessfully to detach themselves from each other, O'Brien, an experienced skydiver, performed a standard skydiving emergency procedure called a cutaway. He jettisoned his main parachute and deployed his reserve parachute; however, by the time he performed the maneuver, he was already at such a low altitude that he struck the ground before his reserve canopy was able to inflate. The other jumper managed to use the entangled main parachutes to land safely. O'Brien was 43 at the time of the fatal incident.

Following his death, O'Brien was remembered by friends and colleagues at a memorial service in the Philadelphia area. His remains were returned to Harris County, Texas, where a funeral service was held at the Memorial Oaks Cemetery in Houston and officiated by the Rev. A.M. Stone, the pastor of Fairbanks Baptist Church, O'Brien's hometown church. O'Brien's mother and sister, Nancy (Oldham) Wood, and his daughters Peri and Patti Jo, and former wives, Sandra Gilpin and Sue Brooks, were among those present at the graveside service.

== Personal life ==
O'Brien married Sandra Jo Hauck in a small ceremony in Texas. He and his wife had two daughters: actress Peri Gilpin (born Peri Kay Oldham), who played the character Roz Doyle on the television program Frasier, and Patti Jo Wynne (née Oldham), who married Shannon Wynne.

== Legacy ==
O'Brien was inducted posthumously into the Broadcast Pioneers of Philadelphia Hall of Fame in 1997.
