= Peri Gilpin =

American actress (born 1961)

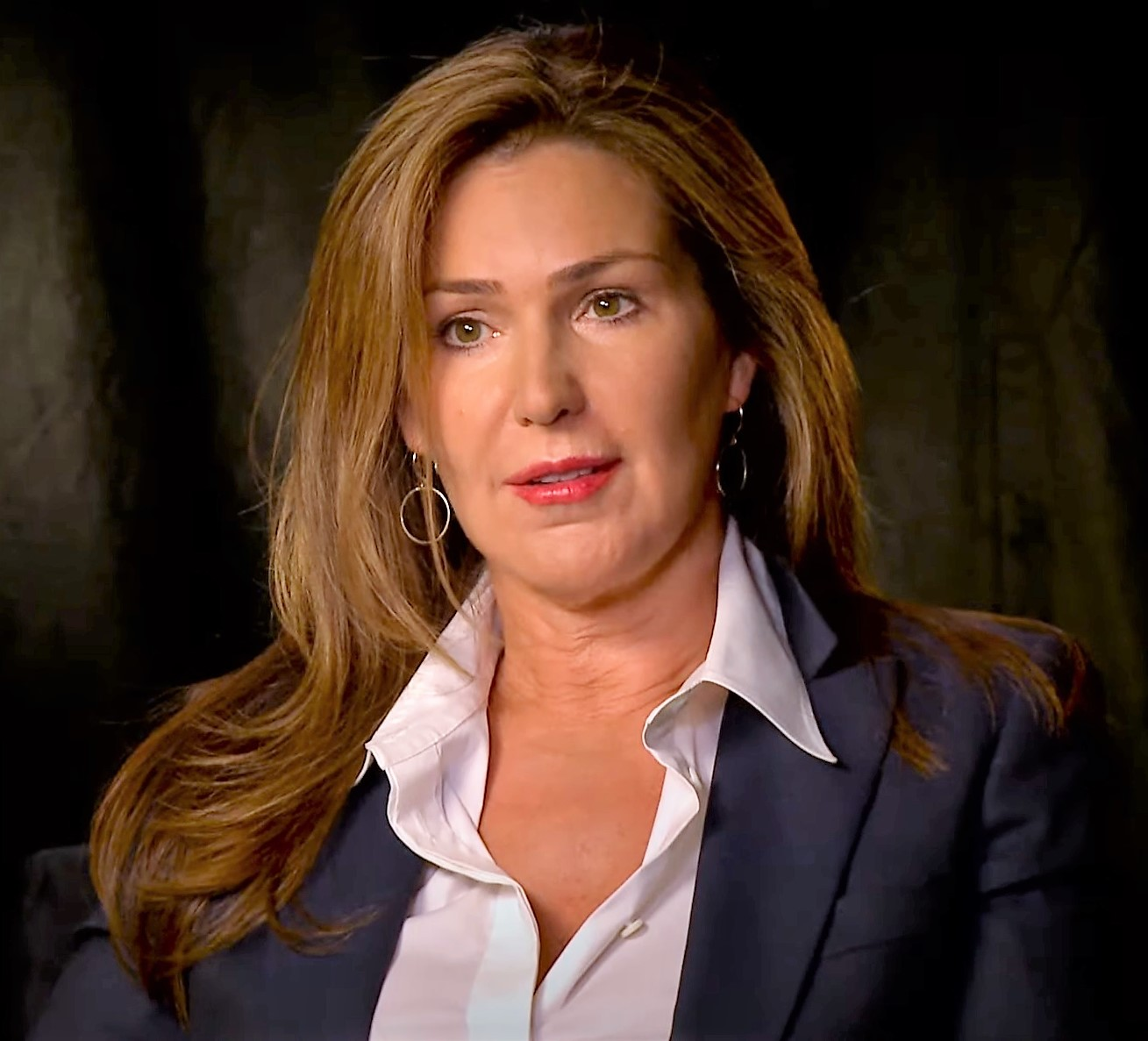
- Gilpin in 2011
- Born: Peri Kay Oldham; May 27, 1961 (age 65); Waco, Texas, U.S.
- Education: University of Texas at Austin
- Occupation: Actress
- Years active: 1988–present
- Known for: Roz Doyle – Frasier; Kim Keeler – Make It or Break It
- Spouse: Christian Vincent (m. 1999)
- Children: 2
- Father: Jim O'Brien
- Relatives: Marc Gilpin (brother)

Peri Gilpin (born Peri Kay Oldham; May 27, 1961) is an American actress who portrayed Roz Doyle in the NBC sitcom Frasier and Kim Keeler in the ABC Family drama series Make It or Break It.

== Career ==
As a child, Gilpin took drama classes at Dallas Children's Theater. In 1979, upon graduating from Skyline High School, Gilpin enrolled in University of Texas at Austin, majoring in drama, until she was expelled from the acting program at the end of sophomore year. After that, she took acting classes in London, then returned to Dallas and worked briefly as a makeup artist. She apprenticed for five summers at Williamstown Theatre Festival in Massachusetts; during her last summer, she was cast as the lead in Hawthorne Country, her first major starring role. She joined the Actors Equity in 1988.

Gilpin appeared on the TV series Cheers, playing Holly Matheson in the 21st episode of the 11th season, which aired in April 1993.

From 1993 until 2004, Gilpin played Roz Doyle in the television series Frasier, a spin-off of Cheers, starring Kelsey Grammer as Frasier Crane, the role he had played on Cheers since 1984. She was given the role after being one of over 300 actresses to answer the casting call. Gilpin’s fellow finalist for the role was Lisa Kudrow. Along with the principal cast, Gilpin won a Screen Actors Guild Award for Outstanding Performance by an Ensemble in a Comedy Series in 1999.

In 2009, Gilpin appeared in the ABC Family drama Make It or Break It, for which she received a Gracie Award in the category of "Outstanding Female Actor in a Supporting Role in a Drama Series".

Gilpin and Frasier co-star Jane Leeves ran a production company, Bristol Cities (named from the cockney rhyming slang), whose projects included a Fox Network pilot titled Minister of Divine, an American remake of the British sitcom The Vicar of Dibley with Kirstie Alley (another Cheers regular) in a starring role. Gilpin is the voice artist for the character Jane Proudfoot in Final Fantasy: The Spirits Within. She provided the voices of Desiree in the Nickelodeon animated television series Danny Phantom, Volcana in Superman: The Animated Series and Justice League, Hecate in Hercules, and Kate Corrigan in the Hellboy animated films. Gilpin also did voice work for several Wells Fargo and Johnsonville Meats TV commercials.

Gilpin has appeared on the television series Medium and Desperate Housewives. She had a supporting role on the television series Make It or Break It and has appeared on Law & Order: Criminal Intent. She also starred alongside Teri Polo in the Lifetime film For the Love of a Child. In 2012, Gilpin guest-starred with another Cheers alumnus, Ted Danson, in CSI: Crime Scene Investigation. She had a recurring role in Men at Work on TBS as editor of Full Steam magazine. In the second season of Scorpion, she was introduced as Katherine Cooper, a team superior in Homeland Security.

In 2023, Gilpin reprised her role as Roz Doyle in Paramount's Frasier reboot.

== Personal life ==
Gilpin was born in Waco, Texas, to Baylor University students Jim O'Brien (born James Oldham) and Sandra Jo Hauck. After the birth of her sister, Patti Jo, in 1965, her parents divorced, and Sandra moved with her two daughters to Houston. In 1968, when Sandra married her childhood friend Wes Gilpin, Peri and her sister took his surname. In 1969, the Gilpins moved to Dallas, where Peri grew up. In 1983, her father, a popular Philadelphia newscaster and weather anchor at WPVI-TV, died in a skydiving accident.

In 1997, Gilpin's mother died of leiomyosarcoma. Gilpin has led efforts supporting cancer research awareness since the time her mother was diagnosed with the disease. Her siblings also died of cancer. On April 30, 2020, Gilpin's sister, Patti, died after a long battle with cancer and on July 29, 2023, her brother, Marc Gilpin, died from complications related to a glioblastoma brain tumor at the age of 56. He was also an actor, having appeared in Jaws 2 as a child.

On July 31, 1999, Gilpin married painter Christian Vincent. They have twins who were born via surrogate mother on May 7, 2004.

Jane Leeves, Gilpin's co-star on Frasier, is her neighbor and close friend.

== Filmography ==
=== Film ===
Year	Title	Role	Notes
1998	The Jungle Book: Mowgli's Story	Raksha	Voice, direct-to-video
2000	Spring Forward	Georgia	
2000	How to Kill Your Neighbor's Dog	Debra Salhany	
2001	Final Fantasy: The Spirits Within	Officer Jane Proudfoot	Voice
2005	Thru the Moebius Strip	Caroline Weir	Voice
2016	Flock of Dudes	Adam's Mom	
2018	How to Train Your Husband	Mona	
2018	Benjamin	Marley	
2018	Only Humans	Nancy/mother	
2021	We Broke Up	Adelaide	
2024	Shell	Sitcom Mom	

=== Television ===
Year	Title	Role	Notes
1988	21 Jump Street	Fitzgerald	Episode: "The Currency We Trade In"
1988	Almost Grown	Kim	Episode: "Santa Claus Got Stuck in My Chimney"
1990	Matlock	Leslie Matthews	Episode: "The Pro"
1991	Flesh 'n' Blood	Irene	12 episodes
1992	Wings	Barbara #242	Episode: "Four Dates That Will Live in Infamy"
1993	Designing Women	Jade Herman	Episode: "Shovel Off to Buffalo"
1993	Cheers	Holly Matheson	Episode: "Woody Gets an Election"
1993–2004	Frasier	Roz Doyle	260 episodes
1995	Pride & Joy	Brenda	Episode: "Brenda's Secret"
1995	Fight for Justice: The Nancy Conn Story	Charlotte Parks	Television film
1996	The Outer Limits	Dr. Rebecca Warfield	Episode: "Out of Body"
1996	Early Edition	Lenore	Episode: "After Midnight"
1998	The Lionhearts	Lana Lionheart	Voice, 13 episodes
1998	Hercules	Hecate	Voice, 2 episodes
1998–1999	Superman: The Animated Series	Claire Selton / Volcana	Voice, 2 episodes
2000	Baby Blues	Ms. Brennan	Episode: "Ugly Zoe"
2001	Laughter on the 23rd Floor	Carol Wyman	Television film
2003	Justice League	Claire Selton / Volcana	Voice, episode: "Only a Dream"
2003–2009	King of the Hill	Additional voices	4 episodes
2004–2005	Danny Phantom	Desiree	Voice, 2 episodes
2005	Uncommon Sense	Tracy	Television film
2005	Women of a Certain Age	Dianne	Television film
2006	For the Love of a Child	Sara O'Meara	Television film
2006	Hellboy: Sword of Storms	Professor Kate Corrigan	Voice, television film
2007	Hellboy: Blood and Iron	Professor Kate Corrigan	Voice, television film
2007	Crossroads: A Story of Forgiveness	Erin Teller	Television film
2007	Medium	Diane Benoit	Episode: "The Boy Next Door"
2007	Desperate Housewives	Maggie Gilroy	Episode: "God, That's Good"
2007	Side Order of Life	Celia Hutchinson	Episode: "Awakenings"
2007	Law & Order: Criminal Intent	Grace Pardue	Episode: "Offense"
2009–2011	Make It or Break It	Kim Keeler	40 episodes
2011	Hot in Cleveland	Taylor	Episode: "I Love Lucci: Part One"
2012	Grey's Anatomy	Marcy	Episode: "Hope for the Hopeless"
2012–2013	CSI: Crime Scene Investigation	Barbara Russell	4 episodes
2013	Men at Work	Alex Turner	4 episodes
2013	Modern Family	Jeannie	Episode: "The Help"
2013	Drop Dead Diva	Miss Ortiz	Episode: "Jane's Secret Revealed"
2014	The Choking Game	Heidi, Taryn's mother	Television film
2014	Masters of Sex	Florence Duncan	Episode: "Mirror, Mirror"
2015	Mr. Robinson	Eileen Taylor	6 episodes
2015–2016	Scorpion	Katherine Cooper	5 episodes
2016	Adam Ruins Everything	Miss Pearl	Episode: "Adam Ruins the Wild West"
2017	Broad City	Joanne	Episode: "Abbi's Mom"
2017	A Dash of Love	Holly Hanson	Television film
2018	Station 19	Sue	Episode: "Reignited"
2019	Why Women Kill	Vivian Burke	Episode: "You Had Me at Homicide"
2020	Family Reunion	Grandma Daphne	Episode: "Remember Our Parents' Wedding?"
2022	Kevin Can F**k Himself	Donna Devine	Episode: "Ghost"
2023–2024	Frasier	Roz Doyle	6 episodes
