= Tad Stones =

American animator

- Born: Edward T. Stones; May 28, 1952 (age 74); Burbank, California, U.S.
- Occupations: Animator; storyboard artist; screenwriter; producer; director
- Years active: 1974–present

Edward T. "Tad" Stones (born May 28, 1952) is an American animator, storyboard artist, screenwriter, producer and director, best known for his work for The Walt Disney Company, where he worked from 1974 to 2003. His most notable credits for Disney include creating, writing and producing the animated series Darkwing Duck and producing Chip 'n Dale: Rescue Rangers, Adventures of the Gummi Bears, Aladdin, Hercules, and Buzz Lightyear of Star Command. He was a storyboard artist on Bob's Burgers when it premiered in January 2011.

== Biography ==
Born in Burbank, California, Stones started with Disney training under animation veteran Eric Larson. He entered the Feature Animation training program three days after his college graduation in 1974. After animating a scene in The Rescuers, Stones moved into the story department on The Fox and the Hound. A brief stint at Walt Disney Imagineering followed, where he worked on Epcot's Transportation pavilion and the Imagination pavilion.

Stones worked at Walt Disney Television Animation since its formation in 1984. He was one of the creative forces behind many of The Disney Afternoon shows of the late 1980s and early 1990s. He was a writer for the cartoon Sport Goofy in Soccermania. He was one of the writers and producers of Chip 'n Dale Rescue Rangers and Adventures of the Gummi Bears (third season only). In 1990, Stones was asked to develop an original concept inspired by two episodes of DuckTales; he illustrated what would eventually become known as Darkwing Duck. Stones wrote and produced the pilot film for the show, Darkly Dawns the Duck, which premiered in April 1991. After the success of the pilot, Stones served as writer and producer of the show until the end of its run in late 1992. According to an interview, the character of Gosalyn Mallard was partly based on what he believed his then two-year-old daughter would be like when she grew older.

Following Darkwing Duck, Stones served as executive producer, story editor, and director in Aladdin, a television series based on the original film. In 1994, he co-wrote, produced and directed The Return of Jafar, a direct-to-video sequel to the 1992 film Aladdin. He also directed and produced a second sequel to Aladdin in 1996, Aladdin and the King of Thieves. The film marked the end of the Aladdin films and the Aladdin animated series.

In 1998, Stones served as executive producer of Hercules: The Animated Series. Two years later, he directed the direct-to-video film Buzz Lightyear of Star Command: The Adventure Begins. The film served as pilot episode to the 2000 television series Buzz Lightyear of Star Command, which Stones also produced. In 2003, he directed Atlantis: Milo's Return, the direct-to-video sequel to the film Atlantis: The Lost Empire.

Stones worked at Disney for almost 30 years before leaving the company in 2003. In 2004, he started working at Universal Cartoon Studios, where he produced a direct-to-video feature about Brer Rabbit called The Adventures of Brer Rabbit. Stones directed, produced and co-wrote with Mike Mignola, Hellboy: Sword of Storms the first of two direct-to-video animated films based on Mignola's popular comic book series Hellboy. Stones, a long time comic book reader, had worked previously with Mignola on developing Atlantis: The Lost Empire into an animated series. Hellboy: Sword of Storms made its television debut in the United States on October 28, 2006 on Cartoon Network. Hellboy: Blood and Iron, the second film in the Hellboy animated series, was screened on television in 2007. Stones completed the screenplay for a third film in the series, 'The Phantom Claw" based on a story by Stones and Mignola but it remains unproduced at this time. Stones was the Supervising Producer and Director on another DVD at Film Roman Studios, Turok: Son of Stone based on the classic Gold Key comic book series.

He has also written "Pyramid of Death", one of the two stories in the first volume of the Hellboy Animated comic book adaptation. He wrote and illustrated another young Hellboy story in the second volume which featured another creation of Mike Mignola's, Lobster Johnson, "The Menace of the Mechanical Monster." He also illustrated a story written by Todd Dezago in the third issue of "The Perhapanauts" published by Image Comics. He has also written for The Super Hero Squad Show and Generator Rex. He worked as an artist on Neighbors from Hell and Bob's Burgers. He has also contributed a script for the first annual of the comic book run of Darkwing Duck.

After quitting the Universal Studios, Stones returned to Disney to direct the Jake and the Never Land Pirates episode "The Pirate Princess" which aired June 17, 2011.

Although Darkwing Duck is a spin-off of DuckTales, Stones stated in a 2016 interview that he considers the two shows to exist in alternate universes.

Stones voices the executive on the phone who pitches Chip and Dale the prospect of their own show in the Chip 'n Dale: Rescue Rangers film released in May 2022.

Stones will be a creative consultant for the Darkwing Duck reboot series developed for Disney+.
