= Hellboy: The Science of Evil =

2008 video game

- Developers: Krome Studios (PS3, X360); Big Ant Studios (PSP)
- Publisher: Konami
- Director: Steve Stamatiadis
- Producers: John Whiston; Kevin Bufitt (PSP); Clara Reeves (PSP); John Szoke (PSP); Paul Armatta
- Designers: Graham Rigby; Jess Sterzl
- Writers: Guillermo del Toro; Mike Mignola
- Composer: Christopher Drake
- Platforms: PlayStation 3 PlayStation Portable; Xbox 360
- Release: NA: June 24, 2008; EU: August 15, 2008; AU: August 22, 2008
- Genre: Action
- Modes: Single-player, multiplayer

Hellboy: The Science of Evil is a video game adapted from the 2004 Hellboy film by Guillermo del Toro, based on the comic book character of the same name. It was released for the PlayStation 3, Xbox 360 and PlayStation Portable on June 24, 2008, in North America, followed by an August 15 release in Europe and August 22 release in Australia.

All versions follow the same story line, however the PSP version of the game differs from the Xbox 360 and PlayStation versions. There are 3 playable characters: Hellboy, Abe Sapien, and Liz Sherman. Lobster Johnson was planned to be included as a playable character, voiced by Bruce Campbell, but the DLC was never released. Herman von Klempt (voiced by Jürgen Prochnow) is the game's main antagonist, along with several of his 'kriegaffen'. The game has online and offline multiplayer co-op for up to 2 players.

The game was created under the creative direction of both the comic book's creator, Mike Mignola, and the film's director, Guillermo del Toro. Ron Perlman, Selma Blair and Doug Jones reprise their roles from the film as Hellboy, Liz Sherman and Abe Sapien respectively, providing voice-overs.

== Gameplay ==
Players control Hellboy in a third-person perspective as they progress through a series of levels broken up into six chapters. Levels consist of separate stages and routes occupied by multiple groups of enemies that differ between chapters. In most cases, all enemies in an area must be defeated in order to move to the next phase of the chapter, with ghostly barriers of smoke blocking paths while foes remain present. To combat opponents, Hellboy uses his stone "right hand of doom" for most hand-to-hand combat situations, with heavy and quick attacks that can be mixed together for varied combinations. Foes can eventually be stunned, as indicated with a grey flash. Hellboy also performs other attacks, such as slams and head butts, along with cinematic finishing moves when his opponent is near death. These finishing moves are necessary in the boss fights. As Hellboy defeats his enemies, he receives energy that is stored in his health meter. This energy is used to execute certain grapple moves and to activate "Hellmode", where Hellboy's right hand of doom becomes engulfed in flames causing further damage in combat.

Another weapon that can be used is Hellboy's oversized pistol known as the Samaritan. The weapon fires single shots with up to nine different types of ammunition (certain types are not available on certain levels). While most kinds are for damaging opponents like "Heavy", "Grenade" and "Splinter" ammunition, others can be used during the game's puzzles like "Ignite" to light beacons or "Release" to destroy cursed vines. Additional types of ammunition like "Charge" can only be obtained by defeating certain enemies with a finishing move.

Hellboy can pick up various objects on each level to be used as a projectile or weapon such as barrels, hammers, pipes, rocks and even parts of enemies or their own weapons. Some items are used in tasks to progress through levels such as lighting fires or lanterns. Other puzzle elements include certain obstacles like doors and cracked walls that require Hellboy to smash through with his right hand of doom and then pull levers connected to obstructions. Throughout the single player mode, there are collectables in the form of artifacts and lores. These act as additional small details to the story and increase maximum energy capacity for the Hellmode ability.

The story mode can be played cooperatively with another player, both locally with another controller or online over Xbox Live for the Xbox 360 version and PlayStation Network for the PlayStation 3 version. The game's host always plays as Hellboy and can save each chapter while the second player has the choice of playing as either Abe Sapien or Liz Sherman, both with their own unique abilities and form of combat such as Abe's array of martial arts moves for combat or Liz's pyrokinesis.

== Plot ==
The plot opens in Romania where Hellboy has been sent to track a crazed witch through an abandoned graveyard inhabited by werewolves and the undead. As he battles the witch, she shapeshifts into a swarm of crows that retreats and takes refuge in the nearby village. When Hellboy arrives, he is ambushed by a Nazi soldier and pushed downhill into the village.

The action shifts to 25 years earlier in an unknown part of rural Japan where Hellboy has been sent in to investigate reports of paranormal activity. He is quickly attacked by an Oni. It is revealed through an old monk later that the Oni's hostility is because their sacred artifact known as The Wind was stolen by the Nazis, under the command of Herman von Klempt who is seeking to use it in order to reanimate an undead Nazi army. After heading into the cliffs, Hellboy spots Klempt but is attacked by one of Herman's Kriegaffe. Their fight continues in an old temple until Herman falls over the cliffs after accidentally being struck by a log thrown by his own minion. Hellboy returns the artifact to the old monk.

The story continues back in the present in Romania with Hellboy pursuing the witch into the abandoned village, which is filled with the undead and Nazi revenants battling one another. In a final battle with the witch in the village church, Hellboy pulls down the giant bell, crushing the witch. This is followed by the collapse of the church itself with Hellboy falling into the catacombs, where he finds a group of the undead Nazis excavating creatures resembling an Ogdru Hem, also siphoning a green energy source from the ground. The disturbance caused the catacombs to become swarming with "frog monsters". Eventually Hellboy destroys the foundations of the catacombs, causing it to cave in and knocking him into an abyss.

The following chapter follows Hellboy on a past mission 40 years ago in the Tunisian desert. He stumbles upon a wounded alien soldier who tells of the Nazis again attempting to gain power. This time they tried to use an alien beast, but failed and even though the alien is contained in a crystal prison, it was controlling the fallen Nazis in an attempt to destroy all life on Earth. Further on another soldier reveals that the beast had followed the alien soldiers to Earth. Hellboy tracks down and battles the giant worm while underground. He leads the worm to the surface and defeats it.

Back in the present day, Hellboy wakes up after washing up on the shores of an unknown part of Eastern Europe. There he finds a giant castle on the cliffside. He tries to send a transmission for backup, but his radio signal overlaps with Herman von Klempt's, alerting each to the other's presence. After making his way further into the castle, Hellboy encounters an undead soldier who tells him the castle was built by the Nazis to carry out their experiments, with Klempt returning to finish his work. Hellboy eventually tracks down Klempt to his laboratory. Klempt releases a giant cyborg mutant to kill Hellboy, but during the battle Klempt's control room catches fire and he is badly burned revealing him to be a robot. After Hellboy and the cyborg continues their battle outside, Klempt's real head appears in a hovering jar. Hellboy grabs Klempt's jar and forces it into the power core on the mutant's back, causing it to explode, throwing Hellboy off the castle and into the ocean. After emerging from the water, Hellboy watches the castle's destruction only to suddenly spot the same swarm of crows the witch turned into leading Hellboy off once again on another mission.

== Reception ==
Reception

Aggregate score
Aggregator	Score		
Aggregator	PS3	PSP	Xbox 360
Metacritic	47/100	42/100	44/100

Review scores
Publication	Score		
Publication	PS3	PSP	Xbox 360
Eurogamer	N/A	N/A	5/10
Game Informer	7/10	N/A	7/10
GamePro	4/5	N/A	4/5
GameRevolution	C	N/A	N/A
GameSpot	3.5/10	N/A	3.5/10
GameSpy	N/A	N/A	2/5
GameTrailers	5.4/10	N/A	N/A
IGN	3.5/10	3/10	3.5/10
Official Xbox Magazine (US)	N/A	N/A	4/10
PlayStation: The Official Magazine	2/5	N/A	N/A
Variety	N/A	N/A	(unfavorable)

The game received "generally unfavorable reviews" on all platforms according to video game review aggregator Metacritic. While some critics praised the combat style, most of them complained that the game had repetitive game play and that the graphics weren't up to current console generation standards. TeamXbox stated that if this game had been made for last-gen consoles, it would have fared better, but since it wasn't, it loses the appeal. X-Play gave it a 1 out of 5, and Hardcore Gamer gave it 2.5 out of 5
