= Lloyd Levin =

American film producer

Lloyd A. Levin is an American film producer.

== Biography ==
=== Early life ===
Levin is a native of Paramus, New Jersey, where he attended Paramus High School and graduated in 1976.

=== Producing career ===
He was once the president of Lawrence Gordon Productions, and at one time, Largo Entertainment. In 1994, he was promoted to president at the studio.

He won the Online Film Critics Society Award for Best Picture for his work on United 93. He was also nominated for a BAFTA for the same film. He received a nomination for a Golden Satellite Award for the film Boogie Nights. Levin will produce the film adaptation of Warren Fahy's bestselling novel Fragment.

== Filmography ==
He was a producer in all films unless otherwise noted.

=== Film ===
Year	Film	Credit	Notes
1988	The Wrong Guys	Associate producer	
1988	Die Hard	Associate producer	Uncredited
1989	Field of Dreams	Associate producer	
1989	K-9	Associate producer	
1989	Lock Up	Co-producer	
1990	Die Hard 2	Executive producer	
1990	Predator 2	Executive producer	
1991	The Rocketeer		
1992	Used People	Executive producer	
1997	The Devil's Own	Executive producer	
1997	Event Horizon		
1997	Boogie Nights		
1999	Mystery Men		
2001	Lara Croft: Tomb Raider		
2001	K-PAX		
2003	Lara Croft: Tomb Raider – The Cradle of Life		
2004	Hellboy		
2006	United 93		
2008	Hellboy II: The Golden Army		
2009	Watchmen		
2010	Green Zone		
2014	The Last Reel	Executive producer	
2019	Hellboy		
2020	Da 5 Bloods		
2021	The Mauritanian		

Miscellaneous crew

Year	Film	Role	Notes
1991	Point Break	Production executive	
1994	Timecop	Production executive	Uncredited

Thanks

Year	Film	Role
1996	Hard Eight	Special thanks

=== Television ===
Year	Title	Credit	Notes
1997	Timecop	Co-executive producer	
2006	Hellboy: Sword of Storms	Executive producer	Television film
2007	Hellboy: Blood and Iron	Executive producer	Television film
2019	Watchmen	Consulting producer	
TBA	Event Horizon		
