= Panya =

Panya Панья
- Village
- Location within Perm Krai Location within Russia
- Coordinates: 58°49′N 54°37′E
- Country: Russia
- Region: Perm Krai
- District: Kudymkarsky District
- Time zone: UTC+5:00

Panya (Russian: Панья) is a rural locality (a village) in Leninskoye Rural Settlement, Kudymkarsky District, Perm Krai, Russia. The population was 11 as of 2010.

Panya is located 28 km south of Kudymkar (the district's administrative centre) by road. Verkh-Yusva is the nearest rural locality.
