= List of Hell Girl soundtracks =

Two original soundtrack albums were released for Jigoku Shōjo. The first album contains twenty-four tracks and was released on January 25, 2006, by Sony Music Entertainment under the catalog number SVWC-7331. The second album contains twenty-six tracks and was released on April 19, 2006, by Sony Music Entertainment under the catalog number SVWC-7348.

Two original soundtrack albums were released for Jigoku Shōjo Futakomori. The first album contains twenty-three tracks and was released on January 24, 2007, by Sony Music Entertainment under the catalog number SVWC-7440. The second album contains twenty-three tracks and was released on March 21, 2007, by Sony Music Entertainment under the catalog number SVWC-7454.

Two original soundtrack albums were released for Jigoku Shōjo: Mitsuganae. The first album contained twenty-eight tracks and was released on December 17, 2008, by Sony Music Entertainment under the catalog number SVWC-7597. The second album contained twenty-seven tracks and was released on March 4, 2009, by Sony Music Entertainment under the catalog number SVWC-7612.

== Jigoku Shōjo Original Soundtrack ==
Jigoku Shōjo Original Soundtrack

Soundtrack album by Yasuharu Takanashi, Hiromi Mizutani, Noto Mamiko
- Released: January 25, 2006
- Label: Aniplex Inc.

Track listing

Track number	Japanese title	Translated Title
1	焦燥	Impatience
2	悪意	Malice
3	影差して	Differing
4	蜘蛛と老婆と少女	The Spider, the Crone, and the Girl
5	地獄通信	Hell Communication
6	少女降臨	Advent of the Girl
7	三藁捜査線	Three Straw Investigation Line
8	真昼の太陽	Midday Sun
9	いじめ	Bullying
10	朱に染まる	To Be Dyed Red
11	父と娘	Father and Daughter
12	復讐の行方	Direction of Revenge
13	あたたかいもの	Something Warm
14	芝居	Theatrical Play
15	うつろな穴	Empty Pit
16	覚悟	Determination
17	地獄流し	Hell Flow
18	満ちていく闇	Brimming Darkness
19	哀れな影	Miserable Shadow
20	暗黒イリュージョン	Dark Illusion
21	地獄ロック	Hell Rock
22	地獄の川流れ	Carried Away by Hell's Current
23	優しい気持ち	Kind Feelings
24	かりぬい(フルバージョン)	Basting (Full Version)

== Jigoku Shōjo Original Soundtrack II ==
Jigoku Shōjo Original Soundtrack II

Soundtrack album by Yasuharu Takanashi, Hiromi Mizutani, Noto Mamiko
- Released: April 19, 2006
- Label: Aniplex Inc.

Track listing

Track number	Japanese title	Translated Title
1	逢魔が時	Dusk
2	依頼人	Client
3	想い出	Recollection
4	袋小路	Blind Alley
5	憎悪	Hatred
6	柴田走る	The Shibatas Run
7	逡巡	Hesitation
8	幸せ	Happiness
9	狂い出した歯車	Crazed Gears
10	せつない思い	Painful Thoughts
11	地獄の仕事人	Worker of Hell
12	三藁熱血篇	Three Straw Hotblooded Chapter
13	一目連	Ichimoku Ren
14	火車	Fiery Cart
15	骨女	Hone Onna
16	満月	Full Moon
17	廃屋	Abandoned House
18	刻まれる音	Engraving Sound
19	地獄ワルツ	Hell Waltz
20	地獄少年	Hell Boy
21	さくらうた	Sakura Song
22	迷妄の果て	Edge of Delusion
23	六道郷	Six After-Death Worlds
24	火焔	Flames
25	桜吹雪	Sakura Snowstorm
26	地獄少女	Hell Girl

※ Track 21 is called by Noto Mamiko

== Jigoku Shōjo Futakomori Original Soundtrack ==
Jigoku Shōjo Futakomori Original Soundtrack

Soundtrack album by Yasuharu Takanashi, Hiromi Mizutani, Noto Mamiko
- Released: January 24, 2007
- Label: Aniplex Inc.

Track listing

Track number	Japanese title	Translated Title
1	迷い路	Stray Path
2	深き淵より	Deeper than the Abyss
3	頚木	Neck Woods
4	あのころ	Back Then
5	暗雲	Dark Clouds
6	人間模様	Pattern of Humans
7	赤いマフラー	Red Muffler
8	きくり降臨	Kikuri Advents
9	地獄の舟歌	Hell's Boat Song
10	日常	Daily Life
11	きくり	Kikuri
12	不良のテーマ	Delinquent's Theme
13	小さな幸せ	A Little Happiness
14	悲しい話	Sad Story
15	企み	Plan
16	水面の月	Moon on the Water's Surface
17	沼に沈む	To Sink into the Swamp
18	覚悟2006	Determination 2006
19	二籠	Second Cage
20	地獄交響曲	Hell Symphony
21	地獄メタル	Hell Metal
22	彼岸花	Cluster Amaryllis
23	あいぞめ	Indigo Dye

== Jigoku Shōjo Futakomori Original Soundtrack II ==
Jigoku Shōjo Futakomori Original Soundtrack II

Soundtrack album by Yasuharu Takanashi, Hiromi Mizutani
- Released: March 21, 2007
- Label: Aniplex Inc.

Track listing

Track number	Japanese title	Translated Title
1	地獄絵図	Hell Illustration
2	刻迫る	The Moment Approaches
3	女の性	The Nature of Women
4	藁人形のテーマ	Straw Doll's Theme
5	正義	Justice
6	きくりのウインナー	Kikuri's Wiener
7	夜の三藁	Three Straw at Night
8	時雨	Autumn Rain
9	地獄の入り口	Hell Entrance
10	悪魔の子	Devil's Child
11	丘の住人	Hill Dweller
12	わが町ラブリーヒルズ	Our Town, Lovely Hills
13	裏切り	Betrayal
14	戦慄	Shiver
15	みずうみ	Lake
16	異様	Strangeness
17	復讐の連鎖	Chain of Vengeance
18	囚われた町	The Captured Town
19	あい	Ai
20	集団心理	Group Mentality
21	記憶	Memory
22	少女のうた	Girl's Song
23	あいぞめ (Piano version)	Indigo Dye (Piano version)

== Jigoku Shōjo Mitsuganae Original Soundtrack ~Nikushoku~ ==
Jigoku Shōjo Mitsuganae Original Soundtrack ~Nikushoku~

Soundtrack album by Yasuharu Takanashi, Hiromi Mizutani, Noto Mamiko
- Released: December 17, 2008
- Label: Aniplex Inc.

Track listing

Track number	Japanese title	Translated Title
1	常世の夢	Eternal Dream
2	三鼎	Ding of Three
3	春の風	Spring Wind
4	夏の風	Summer Wind
5	ひとり	Alone
6	悪い空想	Bad Fantasies
7	きくり姫	Princess Kikuri
8	幼女降臨	A Young Girl Advents
9	アンニュイ四藁	Four Straw Ennui
10	冥土のゆらめき	Flickering of the Underworld
11	残像	Afterimage
12	破滅の淵	Abyss of Destruction
13	愚かな魂	Stupid Soul
14	埋火	Pyre
15	怨みの鈴音	The Chime of Grudges
16	少女の気配	Signs of a Girl
17	震える唇	Trembling Lips
18	荒ぶる神	A Rampaging God
19	白い鳥 赤い鳥	White Bird, Red Bird
20	覚悟2008	Determination 2008
21	羽化	Emergence
22	地獄の花道	Passage to Hell
23	地獄デスメタル	Hell Death Metal
24	新・地獄ロック	New Hell Rock
25	悲しき舟歌	A Sad Sailor Song
26	予感	Premonition
27	涙雨	Rain of Tears
28	いちぬけ	Once Through

== Jigoku Shōjo Mitsuganae Original Soundtrack ~Soushoku~ ==
Jigoku Shōjo Mitsuganae Original Soundtrack ~Soushoku~

Soundtrack album by Yasuharu Takanashi, Hiromi Mizutani, Kenji Fujisawa
- Released: March 4, 2009
- Label: Aniplex Inc.

Track listing

Track number	Japanese title	Translated Title
1	月映	Moon Reflection
2	恋心	Love
3	静かな決意	Quiet Resolution
4	自画自賛	Self-Praise
5	村八分	Ostracism
6	追走	Banishment
7	藁と藁	Straw and Straw
8	待ち人来る	The Awaited Person Comes
9	さすらいの四藁	The Four Wandering Straws
10	残念ワルツ	Regret Waltz
11	ともしび	Torch
12	赦し	Forgiveness
13	さかしま	Inversion
14	苦くて甘い水	Bitter yet Sweet Water
15	さかしら	Glibness
16	つぐみ	Tsugumi
17	苦悩のさざなみ	Ripples of Agony
18	寂れた町	Silent Town
19	地獄邸	Hell House
20	独り遊び	Playing Alone
21	弔い歌	Dirge
22	忌わしい事件	A Detestable Incident
23	三鼎ロック	Ding of Three Rock
24	鳥居のむこう	Beyond the Torii
25	地獄流し2009	Hell Flow 2009
26	六文燈籠	Six-Script Lanterns
27	閻魔あい	Enma Ai
