= Abe Sapien =

Fictional character in the comic book series Hellboy

Abraham "Abe" Sapien
- Sapien by Mike Mignola

Publication information
- Publisher: Dark Horse Comics
- First appearance: Hellboy: Seed of Destruction (1994)
- Created by: Mike Mignola

In-story information
- Alter ego: Langdon Everett Caul
- Species: Ichthyo sapien (formerly human)
- Team affiliations: B.P.R.D.
- Partnerships: Hellboy; Liz Sherman
- Notable aliases: Abe, Brother Blue, Fishstick, Waterfisher, King Ocean, The Fish Guy, Creature From Another World, Agent Sapien
- Abilities: Underwater breathing Genius-level intelligence Excellent marksman Formidable hand-to-hand combatant Psychometry; Telepathy

Abraham Sapien, born Langdon Everett Caul, is a fictional character in the comic book series Hellboy, created by Mike Mignola. He takes his name from "Ichthyo sapien", the fanciful species designation chosen for him by his colleagues in the 19th-century Oannes Club, and from Abraham Lincoln, on whose assassination date the Oannes Club abandoned Abe's body in a suspended animation tank beneath a Washington D.C. hospital, leaving only a cryptic note as explanation. He is occasionally referred to as an "amphibious man."

In addition to his regular appearances in Hellboy and B.P.R.D., Sapien has also starred in his own comics, with trade paperback collections and omnibus editions including The Drowning, The Devil Does Not Jest and Other Stories, Dark and Terrible and Lost Lives and Other Stories.

== Fictional biography ==
Sapien began his life as Langdon Everett Caul, a Victorian scientist and businessman who became involved with the Oannes Society, an occult organization who believed in life and all knowledge having come from the sea. After retrieving a strange jellyfish-like deity from an underwater ruin, Caul and the other members performed an arcane ritual that inadvertently ended with the creature's release and Caul being turned into an ichthyo sapien. Believing him to be the Oannes reborn, the society sealed the developing icthyo sapien's body in a tube of water in a hidden laboratory beneath a Washington, D.C. hospital until such time as he was fully formed. Forced to abandon the site by the outbreak of the American Civil War, the Society never found an occasion to return for Caul, and there he stayed until he was found by workmen in November 1978.

With no memory of his life before, the icthyo sapien received a new name from a piece of paper attached to the tube, dated the day of Abraham Lincoln's assassination (April 14, 1865). Abe Sapien was taken to the Bureau for Paranormal Research and Defense (BPRD) for a grueling round of research by curious BPRD scientists and was saved from vivisection by an empathetic Hellboy. Thereafter, Abe entered the ranks of the BPRD as a valued field agent, embarking on his first mission with Hellboy in 1979.

At Cavendish Hall, during the climax of Seed of Destruction, Sapien was possessed by the spirit of long-dead whaler Elihu Cavendish. Cavendish was a contemporary of Langdon Caul, who killed the mad monk Rasputin, foiling his plans to unleash the Ogdru Jahad to destroy the world. During the subsequent "Girescu affair" during Wake the Devil, Abe and a fellow agent were led into a trap which left the agent dead and Abe with a broken arm. Rasputin's vengeful spirit appeared before him and prophesied that Sapien will one day be speared to death.

In Plague of Frogs, Rasputin's prediction came true when Sapien was impaled by a spear and apparently killed by one of the Ogdru Jahad's followers. Sapien appeared to die and had an out of body experience that brought him to his former life in antebellum America. Witnessing his past self's actions, Abe entered Caul's body prior to his transformation, creating a spiritual/mystical time loop before Abe returned to live in the present, where he made a fast recovery and began to do research into his past life. As a result, Abe learns of Edith Howard, Langdon Caul's wife, who drowned herself out of madness. She had become a specter, who was finally exorcized after she attempts to have Sapien resume his life as Caul.

In Garden of Souls, Sapien was contacted by Panya, an ageless mummy trapped by the Oannes Society. Members of the society were sequestered away on a hidden island in Indonesia, their now-withered psychic forms contained in cyborg bodies. Aware of the imminent apocalypse, the society was determined to save at least some of mankind's spiritual essence, and were poised to use bombs to cause massive tidal waves which would devastate the southern hemisphere. The souls of those killed could then be harvested by the Society in vat-grown bodies made expressly for the purpose, granting them god-like powers. Horrified, Abe managed to single-handedly destroy the society and escape with Panya, and in so doing finally came to terms with the ghosts of his past; he was truly a separate identity from Langdon Caul, who would likely have agreed willingly to the society's plan. Abe has since fully returned to the BPRD and continues to be one of the most trustworthy agents.

However, in King of Fear, Abe led a return mission into the Hyperborean underworld and was confronted by the supervillain the Black Flame, who had gathered a vast army of frogs and Hyperboreans to usher in the apocalypse. The Flame revealed that Abe was going to be the epicenter of this new Earth and that he was a fully evolved version of the frog monsters: one of the New Men first mentioned in Hellboy: Conqueror Worm by Rasputin. While Abe rejected the idea, many of the BPRD field agents are now wary of him, most notably Andrew Devon; in New World, there is visible tension between Devon and Abe implying that Devon thinks Abe should be much more closely monitored. A vision of the future in King of Fear by Liz Sherman showed that, by that time, Abe will have a more monstrous form.

In Gods, Abe was shot by a psychic girl named Fénix, in whom the BPRD has shown interest. According to Professor O'Donnell, Fénix is equal to the ancient Hyperborean shamans who keep the Ogdru Hem for entering in Earth after Hyperborea's fall using the Vril energy. Fénix says, before shooting Abe, that she knows who he is, implying that she figured Abe's condition as an evolved form of the frog monsters. Abe is last seen in a helicopter, being treated for his bullet wounds. Devon witnesses the shooting, but lies when asked regarding it later.

In Monsters, it is revealed that Abe's condition in the BPRD headquarters suddenly worsened, and, despite putting him on life support to keep his body alive, he suffered extensive brain damage. His doctors declared him brain dead. However, he miraculously recovered, but began mutating further: he grew taller, his limbs and neck lengthening, and his nose receded, all while he was comatose. Abe eventually awakened, discovered his transformation, and stumbled into the empty monitor room, to discover the world in apocalypse while he was out. Panya confronted Abe, telling him what happened and that Hellboy has died. Taking Panya's advice, Abe fled the BPRD, stealing a truck, to go out on his own and discover if he is involved in the apocalypse. Kate Corrigan, highly desiring her friend's return, sends agents to bring him home but eventually gives up due to more pressing matters.

In the Abe Sapien series, Abe traveled through the US on a quest to prove he was not part of the apocalypse and avoid the BPRD (fearing death and dissection from Devon's influence), first travelling to the Salton Sea to inspect the Ogdru Hem there, then back to Texas where he was shot and finally to the undersea temple where Langdon Caul found the relic that transformed him. Because of his appearance and heroism, Abe was seen as something as prophet in a growing religion humanity was creating to deal with the "Hell on Earth". Abe, although was not the only one looking into his origin, Gustav Strobl was magically weakened due to the turmoil in hell caused by Hellboy and became desperate and disillusioned by the fact it was nearly the end of everything and he didn't have a significant part to play. Sensing Abe was important, both men realized the Black Flame was partially telling the truth. Abe was the "Adam" of the race of man to replace the old after the apocalypse but not instrumental in it and most of all not connected to the Ogdru Jahad and the frogs. Abe was psychically contacted by Shonchin, who revealed that the jellyfish entity was an ancient hyperborean shaman of the right hand, who transcended to that form after being martyred by worshipers of the black goddess. This revelation finally confirmed to Abe that he was a gestalt of the shaman and Caul (a combination of hyperborean and man), destined to usher the next race of man, an amphibious race with a connection and innate knowledge of the Vril.

In The Devil You Know, following the destruction of the Ogdru Hem, the apocalypse resumed after the destruction of a powerful demon when Rasputin was brought back to the physical world, revealed to have become host to the power of the destroyed Ogdru Jahad's power. He was confronted by Abe, Liz and the recently resurrected Hellboy in the streets of New York, where Abe was quickly killed by Rasputin breaking his back. Abe's body fell to the bottom of the river, where Ichthyoplankton flowed out of a wound across his chest. After Hellboy killed Rasputin at the cost of his own life, his and Hecate's spirits called upon Liz to cleanse the damaged Earth of the Ogdru Jahad's corruption, releasing her full power, reducing the Earth's surface to a smoking cinder so Hellboy could enter Hecate (as an iron maiden) and his blood remade the world anew. Abe's spawn survived Liz's cleansing and left the sea to occupy the land where they found Liz in a hyperborean crystal.

== Powers and abilities ==
- Amphibious physiology: Abe can breathe underwater and swim at a great speed.
- Excellent marksman and hand-to-hand combatant.
- Possibly immortal: Abe is exactly 220 years old and technically died twice only to come back to life, also survived numerous wounds that would be fatal to humans.

With his second transformation to his current form, Abe's strength, agility, and speed has significantly increased, performing feats never seen before by him. His speed is at its peak underwater. Lately, by his own admission, Abe has been having an intuition of danger, always knowing something bad is going on before it happens with little to no proof.

In the films, he displays a genius-level intelligence, and has psychic intuition, making him adept at telepathy and psychometry. However, his strength is not increased, while he has superhuman speed underwater. He is also capable of surviving wounds that would be fatal to humans.

== In other media ==
Doug Jones as Abe Sapien in Hellboy

=== Films ===
==== Hellboy (2004) ====
In the 2004 film adaptation, Hellboy, Sapien is portrayed by Doug Jones, and voiced by an uncredited David Hyde Pierce who refused credit out of respect for Jones's performance. This version of Abe has a dolphin-like frontal lobe that enables him to transmit and receive electro-psychic information in the same way that cetaceans use sonar. He also has an encyclopedic knowledge of the occult and holds paranormal expertise rivaled only by Professor Bruttenholm. Additionally, he is unable to survive out of water for long periods without a collar-like apparatus that provides water to his gills.

==== Hellboy II: The Golden Army (2008) ====
Sapien appeared in the film's 2008 sequel, Hellboy II: The Golden Army, once again portrayed by Jones, who also performs the character's speaking voice. He doesn't wear his breathing apparatus as much in this film, and he shows his marksman skills in the film. He is also the one who discovers Liz's pregnancy in the mission where Hellboy is revealed to the world. He falls in love with the elf Princess Nuala, which leads to his helping Prince Nuada by giving him the magical crown piece (to control the Golden Army) for her safety, but Princess Nuala kills herself to prevent Nuada from killing Hellboy. While mourning her loss, he decides to follow Liz and Hellboy in leaving the B.P.R.D.

==== Hellboy (2019) ====
In the 2019 reboot film Hellboy, Abe appears in the final scene of the film having been discovered by Hellboy, Alice and Daimio inside his stasis tank which is located on a secret facility in the middle of Siberia.

=== Animation ===
Abe Sapien is one of the characters appearing in two straight-to-DVD Hellboy Animated films, Hellboy: Sword of Storms and Hellboy: Blood and Iron, in which he is voiced by Doug Jones. This version of the character, although similar to the movie Sapien, is much more like his comic book counterpart, showing signs of neither the psychic abilities nor breathing apparatus. However, he is far faster, more agile and stronger than humans in the films, allowing him to fight giant creatures that only Hellboy is thought to be strong enough to fight.

=== Video games ===
Abe is a playable character in Hellboy: The Science of Evil with Doug Jones reprising his role.
