= Stephen Brown (film producer) =

American film producer (born 1961)

Stephen Joel Brown
- Born: January 18, 1961 (age 65); Los Angeles, California, U.S.
- Occupations: Producer, media executive, entrepreneur

Stephen Brown (born January 18, 1961) is an American producer, media executive and entrepreneur.

Brown has spent the majority of his career in the media industry as a senior executive and board member.

Productions on which he is credited include Seven, The Fugitive, The Devil's Advocate and A Perfect Murder.

== Career ==
Brown produced "The Ottoman Lieutenant". Brown is a co-founder and partner in Ambitious Productions, an integrated digital and traditional media production company. Previously, Brown served as president and CEO of USA-Intertainment Inc., a subsidiary of Intertainment AG. Prior to joining Intertainment, Brown was president of Kopelson Entertainment. Since 2008 he has served as a consultant to Vahid & Associates Brand Futurists in Bahrain.
