= Hellboy =

Comic book character

- Hellboy by Mike Mignola

Publication information
- Publisher: Dark Horse Comics
- First appearance: Dime Press #4 (March 1993) – first Hellboy prototype appearance, cover only; San Diego Comic Con Comics #2 (August 1993) – first full Hellboy appearance, black and white only; Next Men #21 (December 1993) – first appearance in a regularly published title, first color appearance
- Created by: Mike Mignola

In-story information
- Alter ego: Anung un Rama, Urush An Rama
- Species: Cambion (half-human, half-demon)
- Team affiliations: B.P.R.D.
- Partnerships: Abe Sapien; Liz Sherman; Johann Kraus
- Notable aliases: World Destroyer, Great Beast, Beast of the Apocalypse, Right Hand of Doom, Son of the Fallen One, Brother Red, Big Red, Red Monkey, Big Red Man, Red, Man-Beast, Mane, One Hell of a Superhero, The Guy That's Going to Bring About the End of the World, Lonely Hero, Agent Hellboy, H.B.
- Abilities: Half-demonic physiology (inherited from his father); Superhuman strength, endurance, stamina, durability, and longevity; Accelerated healing; Innate capability to comprehend magical languages; Immunity to fire and lightning; Right Hand of Doom (which serves as the key to the End of the World); Extensive knowledge of the supernatural and paranormal; Expert investigator; Skilled hand-to-hand combatant; Decently skilled marksman; Equipped with various items meant to repel supernatural threats

Hellboy is a fictional superpowered paranormal investigator created by writer-artist Mike Mignola and appearing in comic books published by Dark Horse Comics. The character first appeared in San Diego Comic-Con Comics #2 (August 1993), and has since appeared in various miniseries, one-shots, and intercompany crossovers. The character has been adapted into four live-action films: Hellboy (2004) and its sequel The Golden Army (2008), a 2019 reboot film, and The Crooked Man (2024). The character also appeared in two straight-to-DVD animated films and four video games – Dogs of the Night (2000), The Science of Evil (2008), Injustice 2 (2017), and Web of Wyrd (2023)

Hellboy is a well-meaning cambion (or half-demon) whose true name is Anung Un Rama, Urush An Rama ("Destroyer of Worlds, Creator of Worlds"). (His true name is erroneously believed to be "Anung Un Rama" by some, but this is not the case.) Hellboy was summoned from Hell to Earth as a baby by Nazi occultists (spawning his hatred for the Third Reich). He appeared in the ruins of an old church in the Outer Hebrides in front of a team assembled by the Allied Forces, among them, Professor Trevor Bruttenholm, who formed the United States Bureau for Paranormal Research and Defense (B.P.R.D.). In time, Hellboy grew to be a large, muscular, red-skinned man with a tail, horns (which he files off, leaving behind circular stumps on his forehead that resemble goggles), cloven hooves, and an oversized right hand made of stone (the "Right Hand of Doom"). He has been described as smelling of dry-roasted peanuts. Although a bit gruff, he shows none of the malevolence thought to be intrinsic to classical demons and has an ironic sense of humor. This is said to be because of his upbringing under Professor Bruttenholm, who raised him as a normal boy.

Hellboy works for the B.P.R.D., an international non-governmental agency, and for himself, against dark forces including Nazis and witches, in a series of tales that have their roots in folklore, pulp magazines, vintage adventure, Lovecraftian horror, and horror fiction. In earlier stories, he is identified as the "World's Greatest Paranormal Investigator".

== Fictional character biography ==
The half-demon that would become Hellboy was conceived April 30, 1574 at a Witches' Sabbath. Sixteen-year-old witch Sarah Hughes summoned the archdemon Azzael, an archduke of Hell, consorting with him and unknowingly conceiving his son as well.

On October 5, 1617, within a church in East Bromwich, England, Hughes made a deathbed confession to her children, both members of the clergy. Upon the moment of her death, Azzael came forth to claim his unborn son and incinerated Hughes' children for attempting to drive him off. He then brought Sarah to Hell, where she too was burned away. The newborn half-demon half-human's right hand was cut away, replaced with a large stone forelimb (the "Right Hand of Doom") that held the power to free the Ogdru Jahad (a destructive, seven-headed dragon imprisoned in deep space) and awaken the armies of Hell to wage war against Heaven. When the other princes of Hell learned of Azzael's actions, they condemned him, but Azzael was able to send his half-demon child away moments before being stripped of his powers and imprisoned in ice (like Lucifer in Dante's Divine Comedy).

On December 23, 1944, in the final months of World War II, the mystic Grigori Rasputin oversaw an occult Nazi ritual ("Project Ragna Rok") to awaken the Ogdru Jahad and turn the tide of the war. Though nothing appeared to happen at first, the child suddenly appeared on Earth in a fireball at the ruins of the Bromwich church, likely guided there by the spirits of his half-siblings. Though his appearance was a shock to the Allied forces encamped there, they quickly realized that he did not seem dangerous. As one onlooker remarked that the half-demon looked "like a little boy", Professor Trevor Bruttenholm uttered "Hellboy", inadvertently giving the child a name.

=== With the B.P.R.D. ===
The infant Hellboy was taken to a United States Air Force base in New Mexico. Soon after, the Bureau for Paranormal Research and Defense (BPRD), an organization dedicated to combating occult threats, was established by Bruttenholm (who served as its first director) and other paranormal experts. The fledgling B.P.R.D. was initially granted custody of Hellboy, though Bruttenholm himself officially adopted the child as his own in March 1946.

Hellboy matured much more rapidly than a normal human child: he learned to crawl within a week, and was walking and talking at a month old. He appeared fully-grown by the age of eight, and did not appreciably age further over the following sixty-plus years.

Though initially raised in secret, Hellboy was revealed to the world by 1947. He briefly became a media darling of the Atomic Age, featured in LIFE magazine, and his appearance rarely provokes a reaction of shock or alarm. He began filing down his horns as a child, continuing the practice through adulthood. On August 6, 1952, a special act of the United Nations officially granted Hellboy honorary "human" status.

==== B.P.R.D. career ====
In 1952, a week after being legally recognized as human, Hellboy officially joined the Bureau for Paranormal Research and Defense as a full time agent. Having matured with years of experience, Hellboy quickly became the Bureau's top investigator and field operative, alongside other human and quasi-human agents that include Kate Corrigan, a professor of folklore at New York University; Abe Sapien, an amphibian humanoid (Ichthyo sapiens); and Liz Sherman, a young pyrokinetic.

During one of his early missions, he rescued a young girl named Alice Monaghan, who had been replaced by fairies with a changeling named Gruagach; this act foiled Gruagach's hopes of an easy human life. He also went to Russia and shot out the eye of the witch Baba Yaga for kidnapping and eating children. Gruagach and Baba Yaga both held lifelong grudges against Hellboy over these incidents.

Things change dramatically for Hellboy during the events of Seed of Destruction when he searches for Professor Bruttenholm after he disappears during an expedition in the Arctic. He finds his adopted father only to witness his death at the hands of a Lovecraftian frog monster. The search takes Hellboy, Abe, and Liz to the Cavendish Hall mansion, where they fall into a trap set by Rasputin to lure Hellboy into an embrace of his own "destiny", with the assistance of Sadu-Hem, one of the 369 spawn of the Ogdru Jahad. Controlled by the spirit of one of the ancestral Cavendish men, Abe impales Rasputin. Liz's firestorm then incinerates Rasputin's body alongside Sadu-Hem's and destroys Cavendish Hall.

Soon after, during a visit to Bromwich Church, Hellboy gets a glimpse of his conception 300+ years ago and learns he has two human half-siblings, a nun and a priest whose spirits remain bound to the place of their deaths after dying at the hand of his father Azzael.

During the events of Hellboy: Wake the Devil, Hellboy, ostensibly content to remain ignorant of his true nature, is set back on his journey of self-discovery when a mission for the B.P.R.D. leads him to Romania to investigate the theft of an ancient box containing the corpse of Vladimir Giurescu, a Napoleonic officer who was, in fact, a vampire before he was "killed" on the order of a fearful Adolf Hitler. The culprit of the theft is revealed to be Ilsa Haupstein, one of the surviving members of Project Ragna Rok, who was revived from suspended animation and then aided in Giurescu's resurrection. Finding Castle Giurescu after splitting up with the other search groups, Hellboy learns that the source of Giurescu's rebirth is the ancient goddess Hecate. Though Hellboy destroys Hecate's original body by forcing her into the sunlight, he faces her again after Rasputin unintentionally provides her with Ilsa's iron maiden-encased body. Hecate swallows Hellboy and reveals to him his ultimate purpose as destroyer of worlds, but he returns to his own reality after he denounces his supposed destiny.

Hellboy later learns that Liz is dying after losing her powers when she accidentally revived a homunculus while tracking Giurescu, finding Roger in the events of Hellboy: Almost Colossus as he convinces the homunculus to save Liz's life. Following the events of Hellboy: The Right Hand of Doom, gaining insight about his stone hand and being referred to as a harbinger of the Apocalypse, Hellboy is accompanied by Abe to hunt down the warlock Igor Bromhead in Box Full of Evil. He is overpowered and taken captive by Bromhead and his master, the demon Ualac, who use Hellboy's True Name, Anung Un Rama, to restrain him, so that the latter can claim Hellboy's normally invisible Crown of the Apocalypse to increase their power. But this act, however, proves to be counterproductive, as it reveals that Hellboy's true name was never Anung Un Rama. (A vision described to Eugene Remy, founder of the Heliopic Brotherhood of Ra, by the spirit Larzod identified Anung Un Rama with the description "upon his brow is set a crown of flame". With the theft of his crown, Anung Un Rama cannot be Hellboy's true name.) Hellboy kills Ualac's mortal body before the demon and the crown are forcibly dragged back to Hell by the archdemon Astaroth, who is later revealed to be Hellboy's paternal uncle.

In the events of Hellboy: Conqueror Worm, Hellboy is assisted by the ghost of his childhood hero Lobster Johnson and Roger the Homunculus in preventing an alien entity called the Conqueror Worm from arriving on Earth through the continued machinations of the surviving members of Project Ragna Rok. Over the course of the story, Hellboy learns that the B.P.R.D. has implanted a bomb in Roger as a failsafe in case he should turn on them. Disillusioned by this knowledge and finally ready to look deeper into his origins, Hellboy resigns from the Bureau and becomes an independent detective.

=== Post-B.P.R.D. ===
After some time with a witch doctor in Africa, Hellboy is captured by a trio of mermaid sisters and brought underwater to a witch known as the Bog Roosh. In exchange for Hellboy, the Bog Roosh grants each sister a wish. The first two sisters are tricked by the Bog Roosh and killed by their wishes, but the third sister is clever and gets her wish, a missing piece of her father's grave. While the third sister returns to her father's grave, the Bog Roosh explains her plan to completely destroy Hellboy, thereby preventing the apocalypse. At the grave, the third sister is told by her father's ghost that the only way to honor him is to save Hellboy. She does, and when the Bog Roosh realizes she cannot prevent the apocalypse, she allows herself to be killed by Hellboy in the ensuing battle. The third sister becomes the new Bog Roosh, releasing the souls of drowned sailors from which the previous Bog Roosh drew her power. She then releases Hellboy, leaving him lost at sea.

In Hellboy: Strange Places, after several years adrift at sea and spent drinking with the ghosts of sailors, Hellboy arrives on a mysterious island. He encounters Hecate, who once again insists that they are bound together and must unite in the destruction of the world, but Hellboy, true to his values and somewhat drunk, brushes her off. He travels deeper into the island, and is attacked by a long slumbering Sadu Hem. The fight with the creature takes him into a temple at the center of the island, where the creature stabs him through the chest, seemingly killing him. While dead, Hellboy has another conversation with the Witch Doctor, who somehow resurrects him. Hellboy awakens to find his spilled blood absorbed by the corpse of a long dead mystic who was killed in the temple. Hellboy's blood resurrects him and transforms him into a more demonic looking version of Hellboy himself. The Mystic reveals to Hellboy the true nature of his Right Hand of Doom, which is actually the severed hand of one of the Angels involved in the creation of the Ogdru Jahad, and is therefore the only power in the universe capable of fully returning the Ogdru Jahad to Earth. The Mystic threatens to force all of mankind to worship the Sadu Hem, and Hellboy fights to stop him. Hellboy is ultimately able to win the fight. Rattled, Hellboy sets sail for England, much to the chagrin of Gruagach and the council of fairies who have been watching over him.

Six years later, as Hellboy: Darkness Calls opens, Hellboy's search takes him to England where he finds himself in the middle of a power vacuum caused by Bromhead incapacitating Hecate in Italy. Refusing to serve the witches as their king, Hellboy ends up in the dimension of the witch Baba Yaga. Managing to defeat Baba Yaga's champion Koshchei the Deathless, Hellboy returns to his reality and is led to Bromhead after he became monstrous and in agony from his attempt to take Hecate's powers for his own. Hellboy gives Bromhead a merciful death before returning to England.

Hellboy: The Wild Hunt opens with Hellboy receiving an invitation by the Osiris Club to join them in hunting Giants. Hellboy joins, but is betrayed by the Club and left to die. He survives, and, despite being given a means to escape, decides to engage the Giants in battle. He grows more bloodthirsty and demonic over the course of the fight, only returning to his senses when all the Giants are dead. He is found by Alice Monaghan, who, since being rescued by Hellboy in her youth, has become a close consort to the faeries of England. She takes Hellboy to meet Mab, Queen of the Faeries, who hints that his mother's ancestry entitles him to a crown. After this, Alice and Hellboy are led into a trap where Alice is nearly fatally poisoned. The two are the taken to the castle of Morgana Le Fay to save Alice.

To enter the castle, Hellboy must fight Eligos, a high-ranking demon from Hell. Hellboy is able to defeat Eligos with the help of one of his slaves, in exchange for Hellboy remembering the slave when he becomes ruler of Hell. Once inside, Morgana reveals to Hellboy that, on his mother's side, he is a descendant of Mordred, and subsequently the rightful ruler of England. She also tells him about Nimue, a long-imprisoned witch who has been freed by Grugach and wants to conquer England. She takes Hellboy to the sword Excalibur, but he does not take it. Alice tries to convince him that he should, but is unsuccessful. Soon afterwards, he is visited again by Astaroth, who reveals to him that he is destined to kill Satan and become the ruler of Hell. Hellboy fights against a demonic illusion of himself, exploding into a fireball that destroys part of the castle and seemingly kills Alice. Convinced that Alice was right, Hellboy takes up Excalibur and suddenly finds himself atop a hill, with Alice, alive and well, standing beside him.

As Hellboy: The Storm and the Fury opens, Hellboy and Alice have begun travelling throughout England, amassing an army from the noble dead of England. Soon, they are attacked by one of Nimue's soldiers. Hellboy is able to defeat the soldier, but while dying the soldier warns Hellboy that Nimue is transforming into something else. The two stop at a pub, where Hellboy decides that he no longer wants the sword, suggesting to Alice that she leave it in a lake. They share a kiss, and Hellboy asks Alice to move to America with him after he has defeated Nimue. On the way to Nimue's fortress, Hellboy has another confrontation with Astartoth, rebuking him again. He then runs into Baba Yaga, who tells him that he will only be able to reach the fortress with her magical help. In exchange, Hellboy finally sacrifices his eye to Baba Yaga. Reaching Nimue, Hellboy sees she has been completely possessed by the Ogdru Jahad and now seeks to destroy the world. The two engage in battle as storms rage across England, and Hellboy is able to defeat her using a sword given to him by the ghost of Vasilisa. As the Dragon collapses, Nimue's ghost emerges and plucks out Hellboy's heart, damning him to Hell.

=== Death and afterlife ===
Hellboy in Hell begins with Hellboy stuck in the Abyss, the outermost part of Hell, and being attacked by Eligos. He is saved by Edward Grey, a british paranormal investigator who wound up trapped in Hell and has been watching over Hellboy for many years. Soon after, Hellboy is visited by three spirits. The first takes him to see his birth in Hell and his father's imprisonment. Then he is shown Satan, who he murders as prophesied, but does not remember doing so. Finally, he is shown the sleeping army of Hell that his Right Hand has the power to awaken. After this, he is attacked by his fully demonic half brothers Lusk and Gammon who are being manipulated by Astaroth. All three are killed, and Hellboy falls again into the Abyss. He is saved again by Grey, who convinces him to commit to his new life in Hell. In between helping out lost souls, Hellboy learns gradually that the aristocracy of Hell have all gone into hiding or been killed by their slaves since his arrival, as they panicked over the thought that he might kill them all. He is poisoned by powerful spirits called the Furies, who were set on him by his half sister Gamori. The furies turn on her, dooming her to destroy the remains of Pandemonium, the capital city of Hell. Eventually, Hellboy, in fully demonic form, hunts down the last remaining rulers of Hell and destroys them all with the help of their slaves. After this, he returns to a home on the beach where he is met by three glowing shapes.

Hellboy returns, resurrected, in B.P.R.D: The Devil You Know, the final arc of the narrative. He fights alongside his original companions, Liz Sherman and Abe Sapien, against the rising Sadu Hem and a small group of demons seeking to conquer Earth. The team defeats the demon Yomyael, who is possessing a young girl named Varvara. Once free, however, Varvara reveals herself to be the daughter of their old foe Rasputin, and resurrects him. Hellboy and Rasputin battle one last time, both dying. As a ghost, Hellboy is shown the remaining path to the end of the world by Edward Grey. Agents of the B.P.R.D. are able to save a small portion of humanity, guiding them to shelter underground. On the surface, the Sadu Hem reign for a short time before the Osiris Club use Hellboy's severed Right Hand of Doom to summon the Ogdru Jahad to Earth and kill it. Once this is done, Hellboy takes back the Hand, killing the Osiris Club in the process. Finally, he sees Liz Sherman, somehow still alive, and instructs her to unleash the full brunt of her pyrokinetic abilities, burning down the world. The world gone, Hecate appears before Hellboy, once again in her Iron Maiden form. She assures him that there is nothing he could have done to prevent any of this. He tries to fight her, but realizes how tired he is of violence. He steps inside her Iron Maiden form, and his blood revives the world.

== Powers and abilities ==
Afforded by his demonic heritage as well as extensive physical training and bodybuilding, Hellboy possesses superhuman strength that exceeds the 1-ton base limit, endurance, a degree of resistance to injury, and a healing factor that allows him to heal quickly from virtually all bodily injuries as well as renders him immune to all diseases. He also has the innate ability to comprehend ancient and magical languages. The extent of his strength is unclear, but he has torn down a large tree and hurled it at an opponent and has lifted massive stones. He has also picked up and thrown opponents weighing at least four to five hundred pounds. Hellboy has a high degree of resilience to injury. He can withstand powerful blows that would severely injure or kill a human. He survived being shot many times in the chest with an MG 42 machine gun before destroying it. He has survived being impaled through the chest with a sword, severe werewolf mauling, being beaten unconscious with heavy iron tongs, falling from extreme heights, being crushed by boulders, and more. In the film version, it is stated that Hellboy is immune to all forms of fire and burns, including Liz Sherman's flames, and electrocution. Despite his ability to quickly recover from seemingly mortal wounds, he is far from invulnerable and can be injured or bloodied by conventional weapons. Curiously in certain instances, the spilling of Hellboy's blood causes lilies to sprout - a supernatural indicator of his true good nature. This unique property comes into play even at the culmination of Ragnarok, where Hecate spills Hellboy's blood onto the incinerated Earth to breathe life back into it. It is revealed to Baba Yaga by the dead Russian nobility that Hellboy may not be slain even through supernatural means and that he appears to be as deathless as her warrior, Koschei the Deathless. In the films, Hellboy has shown skill in necromancy, animating a man's dead body so that it could give him directions. This also happened in the 2019 reboot, where Hellboy is able to raise an entire army of the dead after embracing his power as Anung Un Rama.

Hellboy ages quite differently from human beings. In the story Pancakes he is now two-years old but appears to be somewhere between 6 and 10 in human years old. In Nature of the Beast, set in 1954, the ten-year-old Hellboy appears fully grown. His rapid physical maturation is in contrast to his actual rate of aging, however, which seems to be much slower than humans. Throughout the sixty-year span of time depicted in the comics, he does not age beyond the plateau of physical maturity. This mystical aging process is similar to the other demons and supernatural beings that populate Hellboy's world. The lifespan of a demon (or half-demon, as Hellboy's mother was human) is left undefined within the comics and seems to range from decades to many thousands of years. In the films, Hellboy's aging process is described by BRPD as "reverse dog years".

In addition to his natural physical abilities, Hellboy keeps a variety of items in his utility belt and jacket that can be used against various supernatural forces. He has been known to carry holy relics, horseshoes, various herbs, and hand grenades. He frequently carries an oversized revolver, which in the Guillermo del Toro films was named "The Samaritan", and whose construction incorporates iron that had been used to forge a church bell. However, Hellboy freely admits to having extremely poor aim with the weapon, and often favors fighting hand-to-hand, preferring to use short-ranged physical weapons like swords, spears, and his massive stone fist over firearms. Hellboy's lack of formal combat training and education is compensated for by his decades of experience as a paranormal investigator, though encounters with unfamiliar threats have often forced him to resort to improvisation and using his wits.

=== Right Hand of Doom ===
As revealed in Strange Places, Hellboy's right hand was originally the right hand of Anum the Watcher, one of the angels that watched over the burgeoning Earth and later brought the Ogdru Jahad into existence. After sealing the Ogdru Jahad away, Anum was destroyed by his fellow spirits. Only his right hand remained intact as it was kept and preserved by the Hyperboreans, the first race of man. The Right Hand of Doom eventually ended up in the possession of Azzael before he grafted it onto the newborn Hellboy.

As the hand which created and bound the Ogdru Jahad, it is also the key that will "loose and command" them; in other words, it is a catalyst that will bring about Ragnarok, the destruction and rebirth of the world. The comic books themselves never mention how the Right Hand of Doom would actually perform these tasks; they only explain this is the case and someone or something intends to do it, with or without Hellboy's consent. The 2004 film shows it working as a key: being turned twice in a special obelisk secured by Rasputin would release the Ogdru Jahad. Astaroth and others also told of how the Hand contains the power to awaken the great Army of Hell, an army powerful enough to shatter the boundaries between Heaven, Hell and Earth for the wielder to rule all of Creation. This prophecy had never come to pass thanks to Hellboy's consistent refusal to embrace his destiny.

Most stories show that it is not necessary for the arm to be attached to Hellboy to be used for its true purpose. It has been suggested if Hellboy dies while the Hand is attached to him, it would become useless. He has, therefore, concluded the only way to prevent its falling into the wrong hands is to keep and protect it.

== Concept and creation ==
Hellboy originated in 1991 with a drawing Mike Mignola did for a Great Salt Lake Comic-Con promotional pamphlet of a demon with the name "Hell Boy" written on his belt. Mignola had initially no intention of doing anything serious with the concept, but eventually decided he liked the name.

Later, Mignola became interested in doing a creator-owned comic, as he felt it made more sense to create his own characters for the stories he wanted to tell, rather than trying to shoehorn existing characters into these stories. Mignola elaborated, "The kinds of stories I wanted to do I had in mind before I created Hellboy. It's not like I created Hellboy and said, 'Hey, now what does this guy do?' I knew the kinds of stories I wanted to do but just needed a main guy." He initially created Hellboy as part of a team of five but scrapped this idea when he realized he could not think of any team names that he liked.

Much like other popular male comic book heroes, such as Batman, Wolverine, Iron Man, Daredevil, and Spawn, Hellboy is constantly tormented by his tragic past and struggles with the knowledge that in the right circumstances, he could become a far greater evil. One example being in Wake the Devil where he describes his mindset since the aftermath of Seed of Destruction by saying, "I like not knowing. I've gotten by for fifty-two years without knowing. I sleep good not knowing."

In a 2012 interview, while comparing the Hellboy from the del Toro movies, Mignola revealed the personality of Hellboy was based on his father: "My Hellboy is modeled on my father in some ways, a guy who's been in the Korean War and he's traveled and he's done a lot of stuff, and he's kind of got a "been there, done that" attitude. He's also been in the world. Del Toro's change was to have Hellboy bottled up in a room and mooning over the girl he can't have. With my Hellboy, there were no girl problems. That element of the character was completely not in the comic."

== Publication history ==
=== Development ===
There are multiple illustrations that can be considered a first appearance of Hellboy, as Mignola refined the character's design and he was published in increasingly prominent publications.

==== Great Salt Lake Comic-Con pamphlet ====
The first illustration of a demonic character called "Hellboy" by Mike Mignola was drawn in 1991. Drawn for the '91 Great Salt Lake Comic Convention booklet, the illustration depicts a snarling, muscular demon with "Hell Boy" printed on his belt buckle that bears little resemblance to the character's ultimate design. Decades later, Mignola reflected that "I added the Hellboy name at the last minute, and it made me laugh. I wasn't trying to create a character. I just wanted to draw a monster." This "First Hellboy" design was recreated as a statue by Mondo in 2015.

==== Dime Press ====
A still-prototypical incarnation of Hellboy next appeared on the cover of Dime Press #4, an Italian fanzine, in May 1993. Hellboy, identified by name with a copyright notice, now sports the recognizable horn stumps and oversized stone forelimb, but has gray skin and differs in other elements of his design.

=== Hellboy Universe ===
Hellboy's first comic story appearance was published by Dark Horse Comics, which continues to publish Hellboy comics through the present day.

==== San Diego Comic-Con Comics ====
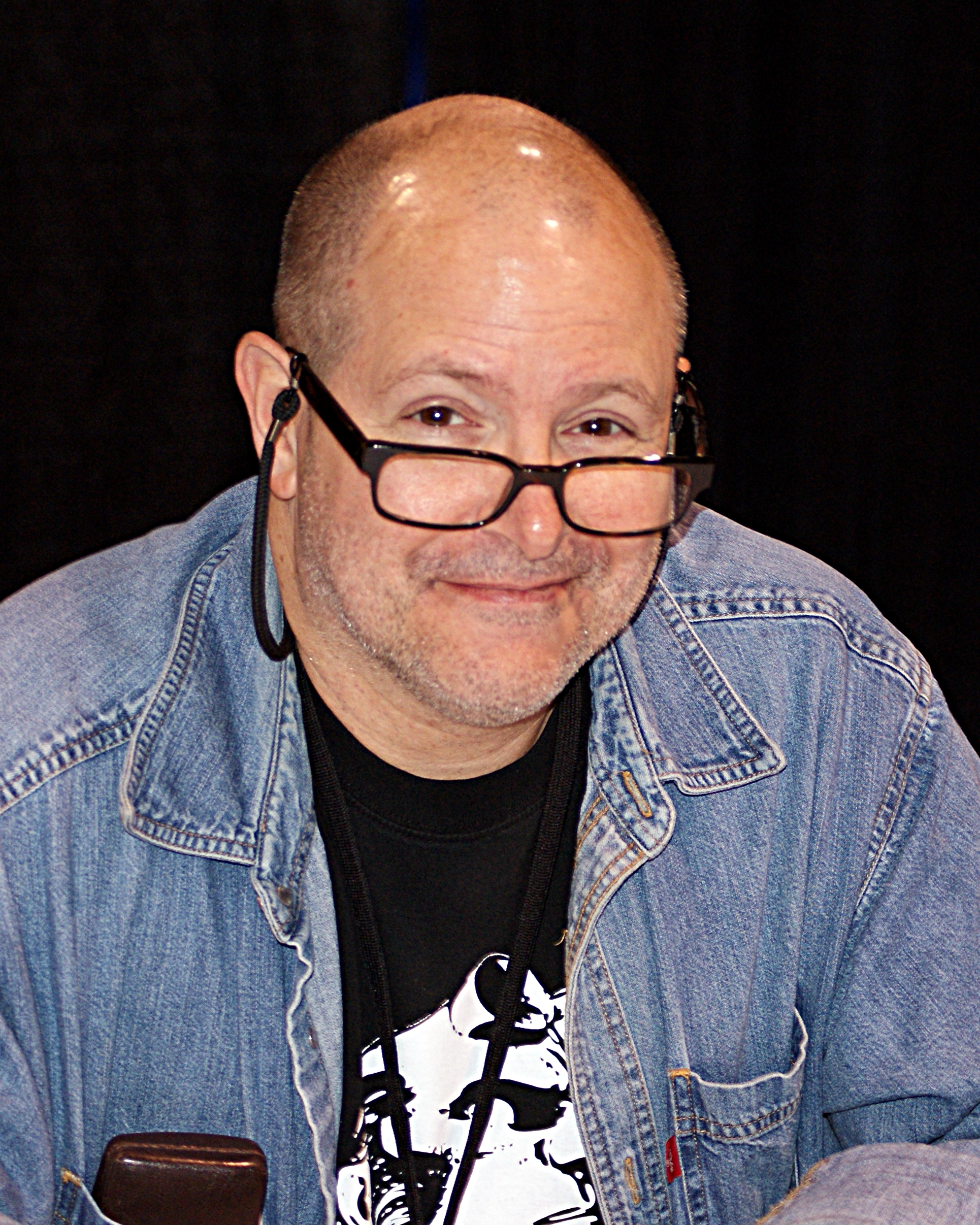
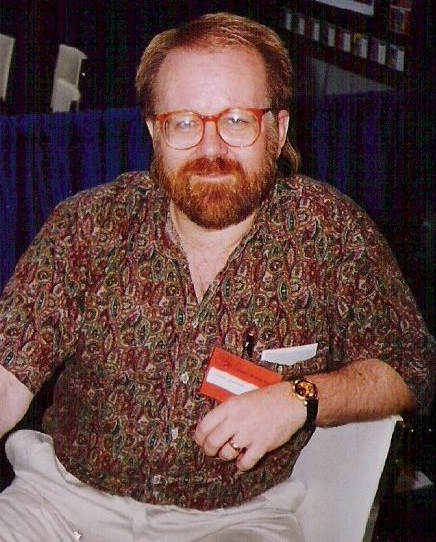
Hellboy creator Mike Mignola (left) enlisted the help of veteran comic book writer John Byrne in scripting several early Hellboy stories.

For Hellboy's first stories, Mike Mignola (who had never written a comic story before) conceived the stories but worked with established comic writer John Byrne to write the scripts.

The first multi-page narrative comic featuring Hellboy was Mike Mignola's Hellboy, a four-page black-and-white story published by Dark Horse Comics's San Diego Comic-Con Comics #2 (August 1993). A promotion for San Diego Comic-Con, the comic saw a limited print run of approximately 1,500 books. It was also reprinted in Comics Buyer's Guide #1069, along with an interview with Mignola. Hellboy travels to an American ghost town, where he encounters Anubis.

==== Next Men ====
The first appearance of Hellboy in a full-length, nationally-distributed comic was in December 1993, in John Byrne's Next Men #21, this also marked the character's first appearance in color. This appearance was marketed as a crossover, with Mignola drawing the pages on which Hellboy appears. This story presents Hellboy as a fictional comic that exists in the world of Next Men, with the Next Men cast recognizing Hellboy as a fictional character from comic books drawn by Mike Mignola; months earlier, a promotional poster for Hellboy comics had been drawn in the background of a panel in Next Men #14.

==== Hellboy ====
The first standalone, self-titled Hellboy comic was the four-part miniseries Hellboy: Seed of Destruction by Mignola and Byrne, published from March through June 1994.

Mike Mignola's Hellboy: World's Greatest Paranormal Investigator by Mike Mignola and John Byrne featured the character's next solo appearance. It was published by Dark Horse Comics in a special four-page mini-comic for distribution in Comics Buyer's Guide #1,070 (May 20, 1994). After this short story, Mignola would begin writing Hellboy comics without Byrne's assistance.

Hi, My Name is Hellboy by Mike Mignola was a one-page panel ad that related the character's fictional origins. It was published by Diamond Comic Distributors in catalog supplement Celebrate Diversity collector's edition (October 1994). The ad was collected in the trade paperback The Art of Hellboy.

The Dark Horse Book of... was the banner title given to a series of four one-shot hardcover comic book horror anthologies produced annually by Dark Horse Comics between 2004 and 2007. Each issue contained a Hellboy story — "Dr. Carp's Experiment" (2004), "The Troll Witch" (2005), "The Ghoul" (2006), and "The Hydra and The Lion" (2007). All four stories were collected into the trade paperback Hellboy: The Troll Witch and Others in 2007. The Dark Horse Book of... series itself was collected into The Dark Horse Book of Horror in 2017.

Later stories have been crafted by creators other than Mignola, including Christopher Golden, Guy Davis, Ryan Sook, and Duncan Fegredo – particularly with the launch of the B.P.R.D. spinoff series in 2002. The increasing commitments from the Hellboy franchise meant that 2008 one-shot In the Chapel of Moloch was the first Hellboy comic for which Mignola had provided the script and art since The Island in 2005.

== Awards ==
The miniseries Hellboy: Conqueror Worm won the 2002 Eisner Award for Best Limited Series, while The Art of Hellboy won an Eisner in 2004 for "Best Comics-Related Book". Mignola won a 2000 Harvey Award for "Best Artist", based on Hellboy: Box Full of Evil. Hellboy: Darkness Calls won a 2007 Eagle Award for "Favourite Colour Comicbook – American".

The character Hellboy was nominated for "Favourite Comics Character" at the 2004 and 2005 Eagle Awards. Other Eagle Award nominations include "Favourite Comics Story published during 2007" for Hellboy: Darkness Calls, and "Favourite Comics Hero".

The comics writer Alan Moore listed Hellboy on his recommendations page, particularly Wake the Devil (Vol. 2), calling it "the skillful cutting and the setting of the stone that we can see Mignola's sharp contemporary sensibilities at work".

In March 2009, Hellboy won two categories in the fan voted Project Fanboy Awards for 2008: "Best Indy Hero" and "Best Indy Character".

In 2011, Hellboy was ranked 25th of the Top 100 Comic Book Heroes by IGN.

== See also ==
- Hellboy (franchise), the media franchise based on the character
- The Amazing Screw-On Head, another comic book from Dark Horse written and drawn by Mike Mignola.

== Bibliography ==
- Weiner, Steve; Victoria Blake; Jason Hall (December 2006). Hellboy: The Companion. Dark Horse Comics. ISBN 978-1-59307-655-9. Archived from the original on 2008-07-07.
- Masters, Phil; Jonathan Woodward (August 2002). Hellboy Sourcebook and Roleplaying Game. Steve Jackson Games. ISBN 978-1-55634-654-5.
- Mignola on Hellboy's Extended Universe. Comic Book Resources. March 3, 2008.
- NYCC: Hellboy Dominates 2008
