= Artist's Edition =

Line of reprint comic books

Artist's Edition is a line of hardcover reprint comic books published by IDW Publishing and originally edited by Scott Dunbier.

Unlike the usual graphic novels, this project features printing of the original artworks in a way to mimic the experience of a comic book artist viewing comic art. Artist's Edition is designed to print exactly the same dimension as the artwork papers that comic book artists usually use in their illustrations and also retaining the editorial notes and printing crop marks seen on the papers. All the artworks were originally colored, Artist's Edition specifically prints in black and white palette to show the details of pasteovers, zip-a-tone technique, and blue pencils. Even though the project requires scanning of the original artworks, Dunbier stated that not all the pieces can be assembled together for some titles, so a "not scanned from original art" line is included in some pages to represent IDW isn't able to acquire the artworks.

According to Dunbier, the idea of Artist's Edition drew inspiration from the Batman Collected book. One of the pages in the book features an original Batman work by Neal Adams; designer Chip Kidd had the idea of photographing the work and then printed in black and white palette.

In 2024, together with his wife Amanda, Dunbier launched his own company, Act 4 Publishing, through which he will continue to publish new Artist's Edition volumes.

== List of Artist's Edition titles ==
Some titles exclusively receive limited edition; available only via either pre-ordering or purchasing from IDW's official website. This version includes a variant design of the front cover and a personal signature of the title's comic book artist printed in an interior page. The trade paperback known as Artisan Edition would be made available later on if a title is eventually out of stock. This version, however, is scaled down to the standard size of a graphic novel despite retaining the same content as the regular version.

Artist	Title	Material collected	Size	ISBN	Publication date	Pages
Dave Stevens	The Rocketeer	Starslayer #2-3; Pacific Presents #1-2; Rocketeer Special Edition #1; Rocketeer Adventure Magazine #1-3	12" × 17" (305 mm × 432 mm)	978-1-60010-833-4	Aug 2010	136
Walter Simonson	Mighty Thor	Thor #337-340, #360-362	12" × 17" (305 mm × 432 mm)	978-1-61377-038-2	Aug 2011	176
John Romita	Spider-Man vol. 1	The Amazing Spider-Man #67-69, #71, #74-75	12" × 17" (305 mm × 432 mm)	978-1-61377-144-0	Feb 2012	152
Wally Wood	EC Stories	Stories from various EC comics: Weird Fantasy ("Project Survival", "Home to Stay", "There Will Come Soft Rains..."); Weird Science ("A Weighty Decision", "He Walked Among Us", "Down To Earth", "Mars is Heaven!", "My World"); Weird Science-Fantasy ("The Children", "...For Posterity", "Adaptability"); Shock SuspenStories ("Came The Dawn!"); Frontline Combat ("Perimeter!"); Two-Fisted Tales ("Blockade!", "Atom Bomb!", "Trial by Arms!", "Carl Akeley!"). Also includes "The Spawn of Venus", originally intended for Three Dimensional E.C. Classics #3, but not published until 1969 (in witzend #6).	15" × 22" (381 mm × 559 mm)	978-1-61377-098-6	Feb 2012	152
David Mazzucchelli	Daredevil: Born Again	Daredevil #227-233	12" × 17" (305 mm × 432 mm)	978-1-61377-238-6	Jun 2012	200
David Mazzucchelli	Daredevil: Born Again	Daredevil #227-233	12" × 17" (305 mm × 432 mm)	979-8-88724-264-4	Mar 2025	200
Sergio Aragonés	Groo the Wanderer	Groo the Wanderer #96-99	12" × 17" (305 mm × 432 mm)	978-1-61377-270-6	Jul 2012	144
Joe Kubert	Tarzan	Tarzan #207-210, #212-213	12" × 17" (305 mm × 432 mm)	978-1-61377-449-6	Sep 2012	152
Gil Kane	Spider-Man	The Amazing Spider-Man #96-102, #121	12" × 17" (305 mm × 432 mm)	978-1-61377-525-7	Nov 2012	216
Various artists	MAD	Stories from MAD #1-2, #4-5, #7-14, #16-18 illustrated by: Wally Wood ("Gookum!", "Smilin' Melvin!", "Bat Boy and Rubin!", "Little Orphan Melvin!", "Flesh Garden!", "3-Dimensions!", "Prince Violent!" and "Movie...Ads!"); Will Elder ("Mole!", "Shadow!", "Outer Sanctum!", "Restaurant!", "Bringing Back Father!" (with Bernie Krigstein) and "Howdy Dooit!"); Jack Davis ("Hoohah!", "Lone Stranger Rides Again!", "Face Upon The Floor!" and "What's My Shine!"); Basil Wolverton ("MAD Reader!"" and "Meet Miss Potgold"); Russ Heath ("Plastic Sam!").	15" × 22" (381 mm × 559 mm)	978-1-61377-544-8	Jan 2013	176
Will Eisner	The Spirit vol. 1	The Spirit newspaper sections: "Heel Scallopini" (Feb 23, 1947), "April Fool" (Mar 30, 1947), "No Spirit Story Today" (Jun 8, 1947), "Li'l Adam" (Jul 20, 1947), "Competition" (Aug 3, 1947), "Montabaldo" (Jan 25, 1948), "War Brides" (Mar 14, 1948), "The Inheritance" (Apr 11, 1948), "The Guilty Gun" (Jun 6, 1948), "The Story of Gerhard Shnobble" (Sep 5, 1948), "The Chapparell Lode" (Nov 14, 1948), "Quirte" (Nov 21, 1948), "Thorne Strand and the Spirit" (Jan 23, 1949), "Taxes and the Spirit" (Apr 16, 1950), "The Desert" (Jul 16, 1950), "Teacher's Pet" (Sep 10, 1950), and "Happy New Year" (Dec 31, 1950)	15" × 22" (381 mm × 559 mm)	978-1-61377-525-7	Mar 2013	144
Jack Davis	EC Stories	Stories from various EC comics: "Black Ferris", "Foul Play", "Model Nephew", "Country Clubbing", "T'ain't the Meat... It's the Humanity", "Lower Berth", "Undertaking Palor", "Forever Ambergris", "Witch Witch's Witch", "Coffin Spell", "Abe Lincoln", "Whupped", "Vengeful Sioux", "Jeep", "Betsy Barrier", "Come Back, Little Street Car", "Kismet" and "Stumped".	15" × 22" (381 mm × 559 mm)	978-1-61377-632-2	Apr 2013	176
John Byrne	Fantastic Four	Fantastic Four #232, #238, #241, #243, #247, #261; What If #36	12" × 17" (305 mm × 432 mm)	978-1-61377-643-8	Apr 2013	168
Various artists	Best of EC vol. 1	Stories from various EC comics illustrated by: Al Williamson ("The Champion", "By George!", "50 Girls 50", "Upheaval" and "A Sound of Thunder"); Harvey Kurtzman ("High Tide", "Corpse on the Imjin", ""Henry and his Goon-Child" and "Man and Superman"); Bernie Krigstein ("More Blessed to Give", "Catacombs", "The Flying Machine"" and "Slave Ship"); Johnny Craig ("Touch and Go!" and "Whirlpool"); Joe Orlando ("Bum Steer" and "Judgment Day"); Roy Krenkel ("Time to Leave"); Alex Toth ("Thunderjet")	15" × 22" (381 mm × 559 mm)	978-1-61377-650-6	Aug 2013	168
Mark Schultz	Xenozoic Tales	Xenozoic Tales #9-14	14" × 20" (356 mm × 508 mm)	978-1-61377-544-8	Aug 2013	144
Joe Kubert	Tor	Tor #1-4	12" × 17" (305 mm × 432 mm)	978-1-61377-769-5	Oct 2013	144
Jeff Smith	Bone: The Great Cow Race	Bone #7-11	12" × 17" (305 mm × 432 mm)	978-1-61377-785-5	Oct 2013	144
John Romita	Spider-Man vol. 2	The Amazing Spider-Man #106, #108-115	12" × 17" (305 mm × 432 mm)	978-1-61377-844-9	Jan 2014	216
Basil Wolverton	Weird Worlds		15" × 22" (381 mm × 559 mm)	978-1-61377-910-1	Feb 2014	176
Jack Kirby	New Gods	New Gods #1-2, #5-8	12" × 17" (305 mm × 432 mm)	978-1-61377-945-3	Mar 2014	176
Charles M. Schulz	Peanuts	Selected Peanuts daily strips from 1950 to 1960.	10" × 19" (254 mm × 483 mm)	978-1-61377-952-1	Apr 2014	144
Jim Steranko	Nick Fury, Agent of S.H.I.E.L.D.	Strange Tales #151-162	15" × 22" (381 mm × 559 mm)	978-1-61377-968-2	Apr 2014	176
Mike Mignola	Hellboy in Hell and Other Stories	Hellboy in Hell #1-5; San Diego Comic Con Comics #2; John Byrne’s Next Men #21; The Dark Horse Book of the Dead	12" × 17" (305 mm × 432 mm)	978-1-63140-003-2	Jul 2014	200
Various artists	Marvel Covers		12" × 17" (305 mm × 432 mm)	978-1-63140-093-3	Sep 2014	144
Various artists	Marvel Covers		12" × 17" (305 mm × 432 mm)	979-8-88724-268-2	Mar 2025	144
Walter Simonson	Manhunter and Other Stories	Detective Comics #437-443 (Manhunter), #450 (Batman); 1st Issue Special #9 (Doctor Fate); Unknown Soldier #254-256 (Captain Fear); Metal Men #45-46; "Manhunter: The Final Chapter!" from Manhunter: The Special Edition;	12" × 17" (305 mm × 432 mm)	978-1-63140-120-6	Nov 2014	176
John Buscema	Silver Surfer	Silver Surfer #5-6, #8	12" × 17" (305 mm × 432 mm)	978-1-63140-145-9	Dec 2014	144
Will Eisner	The Spirit vol. 2	The Spirit newspaper sections: "The Haunt" (Oct 27, 1946), "Silken Floss" (Mar 9, 1947), "Umbrella Handles" (Dec 28, 1947), "The Wedding" (May 2, 1948), "Plaster of Paris" (Nov 7, 1948), "A Slow Ship to Shanghai" (Jan 30, 1949), "Visitor" (Feb 13, 1949), "A Pot of Gold" (Apr 3, 1949), "The Spirit Now Deputy" (Apr 24, 1949), "Hamid Jebru" (May 8, 1949), "The Return" (Aug 14, 1949), "The Return of Vino Red" (Sep 25, 1949), "Crime" (Oct 2, 1949) [incorrectly listed in table of contents as "The Return of Autumn Mews" from Oct 9, 1949], "Lonesome Cool" (Dec 18, 1949), "Sand Saref" (Jan 8, 1950), "Nickles Nerser" (Feb 5, 1950) and "The Island" (Mar 26, 1950)	15" × 22" (381 mm × 559 mm)	978-1-63140-146-6	Jan 2015	144
Joe Kubert	Enemy Ace	Star-Spangled War Stories #139-142, #144, #152	12" × 17" (305 mm × 432 mm)	978-1-63140-166-4	Dec 2014	152
Jack Kirby	Mister Miracle	Mister Miracle #2-3, #5-9	12" × 17" (305 mm × 432 mm)	978-1-63140-302-6	Mar 2015	200
Jack Kirby	Mister Miracle	Mister Miracle #2-3, #5-9	12" × 17" (305 mm × 432 mm)	979-8-88724-266-8	Jun 2025	200
Various artists	Best of EC vol. 2	Stories from various EC comics illustrated by: Al Williamson ("The Arrival", "Fish Story", "Food For Thought" and "Lost In Space"); Wally Wood ("Caesar", "The Martians" and "War of 1812"); Harvey Kurtzman ("Air Burst", "Contact", "Rubble" and "Trip into the Unknown"); Bernie Krigstein ("In the Bag", "Master Race", "The Pit" and "You Murderer"); Johnny Craig ("Deadly Beloved"); Joe Orlando ("Chewed Out" and "I, Robot"); Jack Davis ("The Last of the Mohicans"); John Severin and Will Elder ("Bomb Run"); George Evans ("...My Brother's Keeper"); Jack Kamen ("Beauty and the Beach")	15" × 22" (381 mm × 559 mm)	978-1-63140-291-3	Apr 2015	176
Don Rosa	The Life and Times of Scrooge McDuck Vol. 1	Uncle Scrooge #285-290	14" × 20" (356 mm × 508 mm)	978-1-63140-301-9	Jun 2015	160
Jack Kirby	Kamandi vol. 1	Kamandi #1-2, #5-7, #9	12" × 17" (305 mm × 432 mm)	978-1-63140-344-6	Jun 2015	160
Eric Powell	The Goon	The Goon: Chinatown and the Mystery of Mr. Wicker	12" × 17" (305 mm × 432 mm)	978-1-63140-346-0	Jul 2015	144
Mike Zeck	Classic Marvel Stories	The Punisher #1-2; Marvel Super-Heroes Secret Wars #1; Captain America #265-266; Web of Spider-Man #31	12" × 17" (305 mm × 432 mm)	978-1-63140-391-0	Jul 2015	192
Joe Kubert	The Return of Tarzan	Tarzan #214, #217-223	12" × 17" (305 mm × 432 mm)	978-1-63140-433-7	Oct 2015	168
Herb Trimpe	The Incredible Hulk	The Incredible Hulk #127, #131, #134, #146-147, #153, #156	12" × 17" (305 mm × 432 mm)	978-1-63140-416-0	Nov 2015	144
Sam Kieth	The Maxx	The Maxx #1-6	12" × 17" (305 mm × 432 mm)	978-1-63140-479-5	Feb 2016	168
Graham Ingels	EC Stories	Stories from various EC comics: Crime SuspenStories ("A Tree Grows in Borneo!"); Haunt of Fear ("A Biting Finish!", "Chatter-Boxed!", "Horror We? How's Bayou?", "Drink To Me Only With Thine Eyes...", "The New Arrival", "About Face"); Tales from the Crypt ("A Sucker for a Spider!", "Half-Baked!", "Accidents and Old Lace"); Terror Illustrated ("The Basket"); Vault of Horror ("Buried Alive", "...With all the Trappings!", "A Grim Fairy Tale!", "Where There's a Will...", "Shoe-Button Eyes!", "All For Gnawt").	15" × 22" (381 mm × 559 mm)	978-1-63140-496-2	Mar 2016	152
Various artists	Best of DC War	Stories from Our Army at War #194-196, #212, #248, #265; Our Fighting Forces #145-146, #160; Star-Spangled War Stories #164, illustrated by: Joe Kubert ("A Time for Vengeance!", "Dead Town!", "Stop the War - I Want to Get Off!"); Russ Heath ("The Quiet War!", "The Firing Squad!"); Jack Kirby ("Ivan"); John Severin ("A Flag for Losers!", "The Brother"); Alex Toth ("Burma Sky", "White Devil...Yellow Devil!")	12" × 17" (305 mm × 432 mm)	978-1-63140-547-1	Jun 2016	160
Al Williamson	Star Wars: The Empire Strikes Back	Star Wars #39-44, #98	14" × 21" (356 mm × 533 mm)	978-1-63140-587-7	Jul 2016	160
Jack Kirby	Thor	Journey Into Mystery #111, #117-118; Thor #134-135; Thor Annual #2	15" × 22" (381 mm × 559 mm)	978-1-63140-603-4	Jul 2016	168
Mike Mignola	The Amazing Screw-On Head and Other Curious Objects	The Amazing Screw-On Head	12" × 17" (305 mm × 432 mm)	978-1-63140-619-5	Aug 2016	160
Various artists	Marvel Covers: The Modern Era		12" × 17" (305 mm × 432 mm)	978-1-63140-646-1 978-1-63140-647-8	Sep 2016	144
Jack Kirby	Kamandi vol. 2	Kamandi #11-16	12" × 17" (305 mm × 432 mm)	978-1-63140-721-5	Oct 2016	144
Chris Samnee	Daredevil	Daredevil (2011) #23-27 (slipcased, also includes a 60-page softcover book containing script pages by Mark Waid, annotated with Samnee's thumbnail sketches)	12" × 17" (305 mm × 432 mm)	978-1-63140-723-9	Jan 2017	160
Various artists	America's Best Comics	Stories from various ABC comics illustrated by: Chris Sprouse (Tom Strong #36); J. H. Williams III (Promethea #10); Gene Ha (Top 10 #7); Kevin Nowlan (Tomorrow Stories #1, #2, #4, #10, #12); Arthur Adams (Jonni Future from Tom Strong's Terrific Tales #2-4, #6-7); Hilary Barta (Tomorrow Stories #8, Tomorrow Stories Special #1); Rick Veitch (Tomorrow Stories #9); Paul Rivoche (Tom Strong's Terrific Tales #4); Jerry Ordway (Tom Strong's Terrific Tales #6) and Alan Weiss (Tom Strong's Terrific Tales #6)	12" × 17" (305 mm × 432 mm)	978-1-63140-757-4 978-1-63140-760-4	Feb 2017	224
Alex Toth	Bravo For Adventure	The Rook #3-4, Bravo For Adventure #1	12" × 17" (305 mm × 432 mm)	978-1-63140-790-1	Mar 2017	136
Alex Toth	Bravo For Adventure	The Rook #3-4, Bravo For Adventure #1	12" × 17" (305 mm × 432 mm)	978-1-68405-948-5	Sep 2022	136
Jack Kirby	Fantastic Four	Fantastic Four #71, #82-84, Annual #6	12" × 17" (305 mm × 432 mm)	978-1-63140-831-1	Feb 2017	144
Michael Kaluta	Starstruck	Heavy Metal vol. 6 #8-12, vol. 7 #1-4 (later collected as Marvel Graphic Novel #13); Starstruck (1985) #1, #4	15" × 20" (381 mm × 508 mm)	978-1-63140-847-2	Apr 2017	144
Reed Crandall	EC Stories	Stories from various EC comics: Crime SuspenStories ("Mother's Day", "Return Blow", "This'll Kill You", "Dog Food", "The Firebug"); Extra! ("Hong Kong"); Haunt of Fear ("Swamped"); Piracy ("Blackbeard", "Partners"); Shock SuspenStories ("Carrion Death!", "Sweetie-Pie", "The Space Suitors", "The Kidnapper", "Upon Reflection", "For Cryin' Out Loud!", "A Kind of Justice", "Rundown"); Tales From the Crypt ("Burial at Sea""); Two-Fisted Tales ("Battle!"); Vault of Horror ("Together They Lie!", "Top Billing").	15" × 22" (381 mm × 559 mm)	978-1-63140-894-6	May 2017	144
Jack Kirby	The Forever People	The Forever People #1, #4-7	12" × 17" (305 mm × 432 mm)	978-1-63140-896-0	Jun 2017	144
Jack Kirby	The Forever People	The Forever People #1, #4-7	12" × 17" (305 mm × 432 mm)	979-8-88724-005-3	Aug 2025	144
Walter Simonson	Thor:The Return Of Beta Ray Bill	Thor #349-354, #380	12" × 17" (305 mm × 432 mm)	978-1-68405-079-6	Jun 2017	160
Jack Kirby	Fantastic Four: World's Greatest	Fantastic Four #33, #45, #47, #60	15" × 22" (381 mm × 559 mm)	978-1-68405-081-9	Aug 2017	168
P. Craig Russell	P. Craig Russell’s Strange Dreams	Marvel Graphic Novel #7 ("Killraven:Last Dreams Broken"); Doctor Strange: What is it That Disturbs You, Stephen?	12" × 17" (305 mm × 432 mm)	978-1-68405-200-4	Nov 2017	140
Gene Colan	Tomb of Dracula	Tomb of Dracula #25, #28, #36, #37, #46, #48	12" × 17" (305 mm × 432 mm)	978-1-68405-217-2	Dec 2017	164
Ross Andru	Spider-Man	The Amazing Spider-Man #125-127, #153, #167	12" × 17" (305 mm × 432 mm)	978-1-68405-286-8	Mar 2018	144
Joe Kubert	Tarzan and the Lion Man	Tarzan #224, 225, 227, 228, 229, 231, 232, 233, and 234	12" × 17" (305 mm × 432 mm)	978-1-68405-289-9	Apr 2018	176
Frank Cho	Savage Wolverine	Savage Wolverine #1-5	14" × 21" (356 mm × 533 mm)	978-1-68405-292-9	Jun 2018	140
Jack Kirby	Marvel Heroes And Monsters	Ant-Man from Tales to Astonish #35, Captain America from Tales of Suspense #81, Human Torch from Strange Tales #105, Sgt. Fury #6, X-Men #7 and "monster" stories from Journey Into Mystery #58, #63, #74, #76; Strange Tales #94; Tales To Astonish #19, #34	15" × 22" (381 mm × 559 mm)	978-1-68405-386-5	Aug 2018	176
Walter Simonson	Star Wars	Star Wars #51-52, #55-57, #60	12" × 17" (305 mm × 432 mm)	978-1-68405-604-0	Aug 2019	144
Berkeley Breathed	Bloom County		14" × 20" (356 mm × 508 mm)	978-1-68405-389-6	Oct 2019	144
Michael Golden	Micronauts	Micronauts #3, #7-9, #11-12	12" × 17" (305 mm × 432 mm)	978-1-68405-753-5	Nov 2020	184
Jim Lee	X-Men	X-Men (1991) #1	12" × 17" (305 mm × 432 mm)	978-1-68405-809-9	Jan 2021	160
Various artists	EC Covers	A collection of covers from EC comic books, illustrated by various artists, including Wally Wood, Harvey Kurtzman, Graham Ingels, Johnny Craig, Al Williamson, Frank Frazetta, Jack Davis and Al Feldstein.	15" × 22" (381 mm × 559 mm)	978-1-68405-768-9	Sep 2021	160
John Buscema	Marvel Heroes	Avengers #51, Sub-Mariner #24, Thor #197	12" × 17" (305 mm × 432 mm)	978-1-68405-871-6	Feb 2022	192
Dave Stevens	The Rocketeer 40th anniversary	Starslayer #2-3; Pacific Presents #1-2; Rocketeer Special Edition #1; Rocketeer Adventure Magazine #1-3 Restored the two missing pages that weren't originally available in the first edition.	12" × 17" (305 mm × 432 mm)	978-1-68405-887-7	Apr 2022	136
Todd McFarlane	Spider-Man	Various pages from Todd McFarlane's runs on Amazing Spider-Man and Spider-Man between 1988 and 1991.	14" × 21" (305 mm × 432 mm)	978-1-68405-932-4	Sep 2022	192
Kevin Nowlan	Marvel Heroes	The Man-Thing graphic novel "Screenplay of the Living Dead Man" (serialised as Infernal Man-Thing #1-3); "A Little Fire" (Immortal Hulk: Time of Monsters #1).	12" × 17" (305 mm × 432 mm)	978-1-68405-972-0	Apr 2023	176
Michael Golden	Marvel Stories	Marvel Fanfare #47; "The 'Nam, 1967" & "The Sniper" (Savage Tales vol.2 #1 & #4); "Zounds O' Silence!" (Marvel Holiday Special 1992).	12" × 17" (305 mm × 432 mm)	978-1-68405-919-5	Jul 2023	176
Frank Miller	Daredevil	Pages from Daredevil #159, #163, #165, #168-169, #171-172, #174-181, #184-191 (previously released as an Artifact Edition).	12" × 17" (305 mm × 432 mm)	979-8-88724-004-6	Aug 2023	144
Walter Simonson	Fantastic Four	Fantastic Four #337-341, #352-354	12" × 17" (305 mm × 432 mm)	979-8-88724-035-0	Sep 2023	204
John Byrne	X-Men	Pages from X-Men #108-109, #111-116, #118-143 (previously released as an Artifact Edition).	12" × 17" (305 mm × 432 mm)	979-8-88724-043-5	Dec 2023	160
John Romita	The Amazing Spider-Man: Daily Strips	The Amazing Spider-Man daily newspaper strips from 1977-78	19.5" × 16" (495 mm x 407 mm)	979-8-88724-055-8	Jan 2024	176
Chris Samnee	Black Widow	Black Widow (2016) #1-6	12" × 17" (305 mm × 432 mm)	978-1-68405-711-5	Jul 2024	192
Dave Cockrum	X-Men	Pages from Giant-Size X-Men #1; X-Men #94-107 (previously released as an Artifact Edition).	12" × 17" (305 mm × 432 mm)	979-8-88724-112-8	Jul 2024	160
David Mazzucchelli	Batman: Year One	Batman #404–407	14" × 21" (356 mm × 534 mm)	979-8-88724-003-9	Aug 2024	144
Jim Lee	DC Legends	Various pages published by Wildstorm & DC Comics (previously released as an Artifact Edition).	12" × 17" (305 mm × 432 mm)	979-8-88724-116-6	Aug 2024	140
Various artists	Best of DC War	An expanded reprint of the 2016 edition, now including a complete 12-page story by Joe Kubert in layout form ("The Troubadour" from Our Army at War #200)	12" × 17" (305 mm × 432 mm)	979-8-88724-142-5	Nov 2024	180
Paul Smith	X-Men	Selected Pages from Uncanny X-Men #165-170, #172-175; Marvel Fanfare #4; X-Men/Alpha Flight #1-2; X-Men Unlimited #50; "A Girl and her Dragon" (X-Men: First Class Special #1).	12" × 17" (305 mm × 432 mm)	979-8-88724-179-1	Jan 2025	204
Neal Adams	DC Classics	Green Lantern #84; Strange Adventures #215 (featuring Deadman); "The Silent Night of the Batman" (Batman #219); "The Game" & "Nightmare" (House of Mystery #178 & #186); "The Baby Who Walked Through Walls" (Superman #254); "A Time to Die!" (Weird Western Tales #12).	12" × 17" (305 mm × 432 mm)	979-8-88724-151-7 979-8-88724-181-4	Jul 2025	288
Various artists	DC Covers Volume One		12" × 17" (305 mm × 432 mm)	979-8-88724-296-5	Aug 2025	128
Patrick Horvath	Beneath the Trees Where Nobody Sees	Beneath the Trees Where Nobody Sees #1-6 and the 10-page short story "Präludium"		979-8-88724-448-8	Jun 2026	168

== Artifact Editions ==
Between 2014 and 2020, "Artifact Edition" was used as the title of any book collecting an assortment of individual pages, rather than complete stories. Beginning with the publication of Todd McFarlane's Spider-Man Artist's Edition in 2022, this distinction no longer exists, and the "Artist's Edition" brand is now used for any book (new or reprinted) that would previously have been classed as an Artifact Edition.

Artist	Title	Material collected (selected pages only)	Size	ISBN	Publication date	Pages
Dave Gibbons	Watchmen	Pages from Watchmen #1-12	12" × 17" (305 mm × 432 mm)	978-1-63140-030-8	Aug 2014	144
John Romita	Spider-Man	Pages from Amazing Spider-Man #39-53	15" × 22" (381 mm × 559 mm)	978-1-63140-238-8	Apr 2015	200
Frank Miller	Daredevil	Pages from Daredevil #159, #163, #165, #168-169, #171-172, #174-181, #184-191	12" × 17" (305 mm × 432 mm)	978-1-63140-352-1	Aug 2015	144
Various artists	Miracleman	Pages from Warrior and Miracleman #9-16 illustrated by Garry Leach, Alan Davis, Rick Veitch and John Totleben	15" × 20" (381 mm × 508 mm)	978-1-63140-392-7	Nov 2015	144
Various artists	Star Wars	Pages from Star Wars #1-10 (Howard Chaykin), #16 (Walt Simonson), #38 (Michael Golden)	12" × 17" (305 mm × 432 mm)	978-1-63140-458-0	Dec 2015	160
Bernie Wrightson		Pages from various DC comics of the 1970s: Swamp Thing #1-10, House of Secrets, House of Mystery, The Witching Hour, The Unexpected and Plop!.	12" × 17" (305 mm × 432 mm)	978-1-68405-211-0; 978-1-68405-207-3	Nov 2017	144
John Byrne	X-Men	Pages from X-Men #108-109, #111-116, #118-143	12" × 17" (305 mm × 432 mm)	978-1-68405-394-0	Oct 2018	168
Jim Starlin	Marvel Cosmic	Pages from Captain Marvel #25-34; Strange Tales #178-181; Warlock #9-15; Avengers Annual #7; Marvel Two-In-One Annual #2	12" × 17" (305 mm × 432 mm)	978-1-68405-394-0	Aug 2018	176
Bill Sienkiewicz	Mutants and Moon Knights… and Assassins	Pages from New Mutants #18-31; Moon Knight #1, #3, #9, #11, #15, #22-23, #25-26, #28-29; Elektra: Assassin #1-3, #5-8	12" × 17" (305 mm × 432 mm)	978-1-68405-399-5	Oct 2018	168
Jim Lee	DC Legends		12" × 17" (305 mm × 432 mm)	978-1-68405-442-8	Jan 2019	140
John Byrne	Marvel Classics	Pages from The Avengers #164-166, #181, #185-188, #190; Captain America #247-250, #252-255; Marvel Team-Up #53-55, #59-70, #100; Iron Fist #1-2, #6, #9, #11-15	12" × 17" (305 mm × 432 mm)	978-1-68405-662-0	Oct 2019	168
Dave Cockrum	X-Men	Pages from Giant-Size X-Men #1; X-Men #94-105, #107	12" × 17" (305 mm × 432 mm)	978-1-68405-701-6	Jun 2020	160

== Artist's Edition Portfolios ==
An Artist's Edition Portfolio contains loose pages, printed on one side only, collected in a hardcover folder. Like the regular Artist's Edition books, the pages are printed in the same size as the original artwork.

Artist	Title	Material collected	Size	ISBN	Publication date	Pages
Bernie Wrightson	The Muck Monster	Eerie #68	15" × 19" (381 mm × 483 mm)	978-7-7140-0359-6	Aug 2012	7
Neal Adams	Thrillkill	Creepy #75	12" × 18" (305 mm × 457 mm)	978-7-7140-0360-2	Aug 2012	8
Michael Golden	G.I. Joe	G.I. Joe Yearbook #2	12" × 18" (305 mm × 457 mm)		Mar 2013	23
Various Artists	Best of EC covers	Covers to: Crime SuspenStories #22 by Johnny Craig; Tales from the Crypt #46 by Jack Davis; Weird Fantasy #15 by Al Feldstein; Weird Science-Fantasy #29 by Frank Frazetta; Haunt of Fear #20 by Graham Ingels; Two-Fisted Tales #25 by Harvey Kurtzman; Weird Fantasy #21 by Al Williamson and Frank Frazetta; Incredible Science Fiction #33 by Wally Wood	15" × 22" (381 mm × 559 mm)		Jul 2013	8
Gabriel Rodriguez	Locke and Key		11" × 17" (279 mm × 432 mm)	978-1-63140-944-8	Mar 2014	12
Walter Simonson	Lawnmower Man	Adaptation of Stephen King's "The Lawnmower Man" from Bizarre Adventures #29	12" × 18" (305 mm × 457 mm)	978-1-63140-116-9	Jul 2014	22
Walter Simonson	Ragnarök	Covers from Ragnarök #1-6 (regular and variant versions)	10" × 15" (254 mm × 381 mm)		Jul 2014	12
Wally Wood	T.H.U.N.D.E.R. Agents		15" × 22" (381 mm × 559 mm)	978-1-63140-509-9	Apr 2016	15
Russ Heath	Yellow Heat	Vampirella #58	12" × 17" (305 mm × 432 mm)	978-1-63140-620-1	Jun 2016	8

== Other publishers ==
Since the Artist's Edition line became established by IDW, other publishers have begun to release their own lines of similar books reprinting comic art at its original size:

=== Act 4 Publishing Artist's Editions ===
Artist	Title	Material collected	Size	ISBN	Publication date	Pages
Jim Aparo	DC Classics	The Brave and the Bold #108, #132, #138, #149; Detective Comics #445; Adventure Comics (featuring The Spectre) #431, #434-435, #437, #440. Plus a 3-page Aqualad story from Teen Titans #36.	12" × 17" (305 mm × 432 mm)	978-1-5343-3487-8	Sep 2025	216
Wally Wood	EC Stories	An expanded reprint of the 2012 IDW edition, with 11 additional stories: "Enemies of the Colony" (Weird Fantasy #8), "Plucked" (Weird Science #17), "Flying Saucer Report" (Weird Science-Fantasy #25), "The Chosen One" (Weird Science-Fantasy #29), "Clean Start" (Incredible Science Fiction #30), "You, Rocket" (Incredible Science Fiction #31), "In Gratitude" (Shock SuspenStories #11), "The Whipping" (Shock SuspenStories #14), "The Quite-A-Man" (Panic #3), "Knights" (Two-Fisted Tales #30) and "New Orleans" (Two-Fisted Tales #35)	15" × 22" (381 mm × 559 mm)	978-1-5343-3514-1	Feb 2026	236
Mike Mignola	Hellboy in Hell volume 2	Hellboy in Hell #6-10	12" × 17" (305 mm × 432 mm)	978-1-5343-3284-3	Apr 2026	160
Steve Ditko	The Amazing Spider-Man	Amazing Fantasy #15; The Amazing Spider-Man #20, #26, #33	15" × 22" (381 mm × 559 mm)	978-1-5343-3471-7	Jun 2026	192
George Pérez	The New Teen Titans		12" × 17" (305 mm × 432 mm)	978-1-5343-3135-8	Jun 2026	192
J. Scott Campbell	Wildsiderz	Wildsiderz #0, #1-2	12" × 17" (305 mm × 432 mm)		Jul 2026	168
Paul Smith	Doctor Strange	Doctor Strange #65, #69, #71, #72 and the Daredevil story from Marvel Fanfare #1	12" × 17" (305 mm × 432 mm)	978-1-5343-3233-1	Aug 2026	192
Jason Pearson	Body Bags	Body Bags #1-4; Body Bags: 3 the Hard Way; Body Bags: One Shot	12" × 17" (305 mm × 432 mm)	978-1-5343-3154-9	Sep 2026	248
Various artists	DC Silver Age Covers and Stories	Green Lantern #1	15" × 22" (381 mm × 559 mm)	978-1-5343-3140-2	Nov 2026	212
Daniel Warren Johnson	Beta Ray Bill	Beta Ray Bill #1-5	12" × 17" (305 mm × 432 mm)		Feb 2027	144
José Luis García-López	DC Classics	The Brave and the Bold #171; "Guardian" from Batman: Gotham Knights #10; Jonah Hex #1; Cinder and Ashe #1; "Actionland" from Action Comics #1000; "...And Men Shall Call Him Stranger" from Secret Origins #10; "The Knight in a Gilded Cage" from House of Secrets #154	12" × 17" (305 mm × 432 mm)		Mar 2027	240
Gene Colan	Marvel Heroes	Captain America #137, Daredevil #63, Iron Man from Tales of Suspense #97	12" × 17" (305 mm × 432 mm)		Apr 2027	176
J. Scott Campbell	Danger Girl	Danger Girl #0 and various pages from Danger Girl #1-7	12" × 17" (305 mm × 432 mm)		Jun 2027	184
Stephen R. Bissette and John Totleben	Swamp Thing	Various story pages from Saga of the Swamp Thing #16-64, and the short story "Jack in the Green" from Neil Gaiman's Midnight Days	12" × 17" (305 mm × 432 mm)		Jul 2027	
Dan DeCarlo and Harry Lucey	Archie and Friends	Will use a "flip-book" format, with front covers for both artists	15" × 22" (381 mm × 559 mm)		2027	
Steve Ditko	Marvel Heroes and Monsters	Story pages featuring Spider-Man, Doctor Strange, The Hulk and Iron Man, plus complete short fantasy stories from Amazing Fantasy, Tales to Astonish, Tales of Suspense, Journey Into Mystery and Strange Tales.	15" × 22" (381 mm × 559 mm)		2027	

=== Dark Horse Comics Gallery Editions ===
Artist	Title	Material collected	Size	ISBN	Publication date	Pages
P. Craig Russell	Murder Mysteries and Other Stories	"The Spirit: Art Walk" (The Spirit (2010) #17), Murder Mysteries, "Isolation and Illusion" (Epic Illustrated #9), "Human Remains" (Tapping the Vein #1), "The Insomniac" (Night Music #2), "From Beyond" (Heavy Metal vol. 18 #2), "Command Performance" (Hellboy: Weird Tales #6), "The Birthday of the Infanta" (Fairy Tales of Oscar Wilde vol. 3), "The Golden Apples of the Sun" (The Ray Bradbury Chronicles #1) and "The Gift of the Magi" (Within Our Reach).	12" × 17" (305 mm × 432 mm)	978-1-61655-834-5	Mar 2013	232
Walter Simonson	Robocop Versus The Terminator	Robocop Versus The Terminator #1-6	15" × 17" (381 mm × 432 mm)	978-1-61655-007-3	Jul 2014	160
Wendy Pini	Elfquest	Elfquest #1-5	12" × 17" (305 mm × 432 mm)	978-1-61655-411-8	Oct 2014	176
Doug Wheatley	Star Wars: Dark Times	Star Wars: Dark Times #1-5	9" × 13" (229 mm × 330 mm)	978-1-61655-675-4	Nov 2014	248
Stan Sakai	Usagi Yojimbo: Samurai and Other Stories	Stories from Usagi Yojimbo	12" × 17" (305 mm × 432 mm)	978-1-61655-923-6	Nov 2015	240
Frank Miller	Sin City: The Hard Goodbye Curator's Collection	Sin City chapters from Dark Horse Presents #51 to #62 and the Dark Horse Presents: 5th Anniversary Special	15" × 21.5" (381 mm × 546 mm)	978-1-5067-0070-0	Aug 2016	224
Stan Sakai	Usagi Yojimbo: The Artist and Other Stories	Usagi Yojimbo #65, #74-75, #93, #103-104, #116, #123, #141. Also includes stories from Dark Horse Presents #35-36	12" × 17" (305 mm × 432 mm)	978-1-61655-923-6	Nov 2016	240
Goseki Kojima	Lone Wolf and Cub		11" × 16" (303 mm × 459 mm)	978-1-5067-0739-6	May 2018	216
Will Eisner	A Contract with God Curator's Collection	A Contract with God and Other Tenement Stories	10" × 13" (284 mm × 391 mm)	978-1-5067-0639-9	May 2018	416
Wendy Pini	Elfquest: Hidden Years	Elfquest: The Hidden Years #1-5	12" × 17" (305 mm × 432 mm)	978-1-5067-4854-2	Jul 2026	176

=== Dynamite Entertainment Art Editions ===
Artist	Title	Material collected	Size	ISBN	Publication date	Pages
Frank Thorne	Red Sonja	Marvel Feature #2-7	12" × 17" (305 mm × 432 mm)	978-1-60690-444-2	Apr 2014	120
Frank Thorne	Red Sonja Vol. 2	Red Sonja (1976) #1-6	12" × 17" (305 mm × 432 mm)	978-1-60690-475-6	Feb 2015	128
Frank Thorne	Red Sonja Vol. 3	Red Sonja (1976) #7-11	12" × 17" (305 mm × 432 mm)	978-1-60690-580-7	Apr 2015	104
Jose Gonzalez	Vampirella	Stories from Vampirella #15-16, #19, #21, #23, #27-28, #37, #61, #108, #112	14" × 21" (356 mm × 533 mm)	978-1-60690-430-5	May 2016	152
Walter Simonson	Battlestar Galactica	Battlestar Galactica #16, #19-20, #22-23	12" × 17" (305 mm × 432 mm)	978-1-5241-0012-4	May 2018	104

=== Fantagraphics Studio Editions ===
Artist	Title	Material collected	Size	ISBN	Publication date	Pages
Hal Foster	Prince Valiant	Prince Valiant strips from its premiere in 1937	17” × 23¼” (432 mm × 591 mm)	978-1-60699-897-7	Sept 2017	192
Jaime Hernandez	Jaime Hernandez	Selected works of Jaime Hernandez, from Love and Rockets among others	16.4" × 20" (417 mm × 508 mm)	978-1-60699-996-7	Apr 2017	192
Charles Burns	Charles Burns's Black Hole	Black Hole	17.4" × 22" (442 mm × 559 mm)	978-1-68396-048-5	Dec 2017	160
Ed Piskor	Ed Piskor	Selected works of Ed Piskor, Hip Hop Family Tree and X-Men: Grand Design among other	16.7" × 21.5" (424 mm × 546 mm)	978-1-68396-257-1	Jan 2020	140
Daniel Clowes	Original Art: Daniel Clowes	Selected works of Daniel Clowes	16.7" × 21.5" (424 mm × 546 mm)	978-1-68396-258-8	Feb 2020	128
Bill Ward	Bill Ward	Selected illustrations by Bill Ward	15.1" × 19.5" (383 mm × 495 mm)	978-1-68396-872-6	Jan 2024	180
Carl Barks	Carl Barks Pencils and Storyboards: King Scrooge the First and Other Stories	Pencilled layout pages by Carl Barks	11.2" × 14.3" (284 mm × 363 mm)	979-8-8750-0246-5	Dec 2026	160
Carl Barks	Carl Barks in Black and White: Vacation Time and Other Stories		18" × 25.5" (648 mm × 616 mm)	979-8-8750-0281-6	May 2027	160
John Severin	Rawhide Kid: Slap Leather	Rawhide Kid: Slap Leather #1-5	11.2" × 14.3" (284 mm × 363 mm)	979-8-8750-0465-0	Aug 2027	240

=== FPG Collected Artwork Editions ===
Artist	Title	Material collected	Size	ISBN	Publication date	Pages
Mike Ploog and Simon Bisley	Thicker Than Blood	Thicker Than Blood #1-3 (each page is reproduced twice: as inked line art by Mike Ploog and as fully-painted art by Simon Bisley)	12" × 17" (305 mm × 432 mm)	978-0-9993281-0-1	Dec 2017	156

=== Genesis West Original Art Archives ===
Artist	Title	Material collected	Size	ISBN	Publication date	Pages
Barry Windsor-Smith	Conan: Red Nails	Red Nails from Savage Tales #2-3	14" × 19" (356 mm × 483 mm)	978-1-4675-7215-6	Sept 2013	132

=== Graphitti Designs/DC Comics Gallery Editions ===
Artist	Title	Material collected	Size	ISBN	Publication date	Pages
Kelley Jones	Batman	Batman #515-519 and 521-525	12" × 17" (305 mm × 432 mm)	978-1-4012-5443-8	Dec 2014	248
Frank Miller	Ronin	Ronin #1-6	13" × 20" (330 mm × 508 mm)	978-1-4012-5457-5	Apr 2015	328
Michael Turner	Superman/Batman	Superman/Batman #8-13	12" × 17" (305 mm × 432 mm)	978-1-4012-5706-4	Aug 2015	208
Various Artists	The Sandman	The Sandman #1 by Sam Kieth; Sandman: The Dream Hunters #1-4 by P. Craig Russell; Death: A Winter’s Tale (from Vertigo: Winter’s Edge #2) by Jeff Jones. Plus miscellaneous pages from Sandman #2-75 illustrated by Chris Bachalo, Colleen Doran, Kelley Jones, Shawn McManus, Jon J Muth, Jill Thompson, Charles Vess, Michael Zulli and others.	13" × 20" (330 mm × 508 mm)	978-1-4012-5923-5	Dec 2015	272
Kevin O’Neill	The League Of Extraordinary Gentlemen Volume One	The League Of Extraordinary Gentlemen Volume One #1-6	12" × 17" (305 mm × 432 mm)	978-1-4012-6190-0	Jan 2016	184
Frank Miller	Batman: the Dark Knight Returns	Batman: The Dark Knight #1-4	13" × 20" (330 mm × 508 mm)	978-1-4012-6443-7	May 2016	216
Amanda Conner	Girl Power	Power Girl #1, 7, 8, 9; Supergirl from Wednesday Comics; Before Watchmen: Silk Spectre #1-4	12" × 17" (305 mm × 432 mm)	978-1-4012-6793-3	Oct 2016	248
Kelley Jones	Deadman	Deadman: Love After Death #1-2; Deadman: Exorcism #1-2	12" × 17" (305 mm × 432 mm)	ISBN TBA	Jan 2017	228
Sam Kieth	Batman:Secrets	Batman: Secrets #1-5; Batman Confidential #40; Batman/Lobo #1	12" × 17" (305 mm × 432 mm)	978-1-4012-7681-2	Feb 2018	248
Terry Moore	Strangers In Paradise	Strangers In Paradise #1, #90 and a representational page from each of the 105 issues published between issues #1 and #90	12" × 17" (305 mm × 432 mm)	978-1-892597-69-4	Jun 2018	248
J. H. Williams III	The Sandman: Overture	The Sandman: Overture #1-6	12" × 17" (305 mm × 432 mm)	978-1-4012-9103-7	Feb 2020	230
Brian Bolland	Batman: The Killing Joke and Other Stories & Art	Batman: The Killing Joke	13" × 20" (330 mm × 508 mm)	978-1-77952-980-0	Sep 2024	280

=== Hermes Press Archival Editions ===
Artist	Title	Material collected	Size	ISBN	Publication date	Pages
Frank Thorne	Ghita, An Erotic Treasury	"Ghita of Alizarr" (1984 #7-8, 10; 1994 #11-14)	12" × 17" (305 mm × 432 mm)	978-1-61345-111-3	Jul 2017	134
Frank Thorne	Ghita, An Erotic Treasury volume 2	"The Thousand Wizards of Urd" (1994 #17-21, 24-26, 28-29); "The Deathman's Head" (The Erotic Worlds of Frank Thorne #1)	12" × 17" (305 mm × 432 mm)	978-1-61345-176-2	Oct 2019	144

=== Image Comics Vault Editions ===
Artist	Title	Material collected	Size	ISBN	Publication date	Pages
Todd McFarlane	Spawn Vault Edition volume 1	Spawn #1-7. (1 in 6 books include a notarized McFarlane signature; 1 in 100 books include an original McFarlane sketch).	12" × 17" (305 mm × 432 mm)	978-1-5343-0362-1	Aug 2017	184
Todd McFarlane	Spawn Vault Edition volume 2	Spawn #8-15. (Every book includes a signature page signed by McFarlane; 1 in 100 books include an original McFarlane sketch).	12" × 17" (305 mm × 432 mm)	978-1-5343-1396-5	Sep 2019	208
Emma Rios	Pretty Deadly: The Shrike	Pretty Deadly #1-5	12" × 17" (305 mm × 432 mm)	978-1-5343-2717-7	Apr 2024	144
Erik Larsen	Savage Dragon	Savage Dragon (vol. 1) #1-3, plus additional material from The Dragon #1-5	12" × 17" (305 mm × 432 mm)	978-1-5343-2959-1	Sep 2024	144
Greg Capullo	Spawn Vault Edition volume 3	Spawn #16-20, #35-37, #39, #50.	12" × 17" (305 mm × 432 mm)	978-1-5343-8939-7	Dec 2025	208
Rob Liefeld	Youngblood	Youngblood #1-4	12.25" × 17.25" (305 mm × 432 mm)	978-1-5343-2811-2	Sep 2026	128

=== Lighthouse ===
Artist	Title	Material collected	Size	ISBN	Publication date	Pages
Stephen R. Bissette	S.R. Bissette's Tyrant	S.R. Bissette's Tyrant #1-4	12" × 19" (305 mm × 482 mm)		2027	144

=== McSweeney's ===
Artist	Title	Material collected	Size	ISBN	Publication date	Pages
Justin Green	Binky Brown Meets the Holy Virgin Mary	Binky Brown Meets the Holy Virgin Mary	10½” × 14½” (267 mm × 368 mm)	978-1-934781-55-5	Dec 2009	64

=== Pan-Universal Galactic Worldwide (PUG Worldwide) Colossal Editions ===
Artist	Title	Material collected	Size	ISBN	Publication date	Pages
John Buscema, Gil Kane, Barry Windsor-Smith	Conan the Barbarian	Conan the Barbarian #6	12" × 17" (305 mm × 432 mm)			184

=== Rebellion Apex Editions ===
Artist	Title	Material collected	Size	ISBN	Publication date	Pages
Steve Yeowell	Zenith Phase One	2000 AD Progs 535-550 & 558-559	15" × 19" (381 mm × 483 mm)	978-1-78108-397-0	Aug 2015	112
Brian Bolland	Judge Dredd	Various Judge Dredd story pages from 2000 AD	15" × 19" (381 mm × 483 mm)	978-1-78618-464-1	May 2022	144
Mick McMahon	Judge Dredd	Judge Dredd stories from 2000 AD	15" × 19" (381 mm × 483 mm)	978-1-78618-675-1	Jan 2023	128
Kevin O'Neill	The 2000 AD Art of Kevin O'Neill	Various stories from 2000 AD	15" × 19" (381 mm × 483 mm)	978-1-83786-008-1	Jul 2023	160
Mick McMahon	The 2000 AD Art of Mick McMahon	Various stories from 2000 AD	15" × 19" (381 mm × 483 mm)	978-1-78618-775-8	Nov 2023	144
Steve Dillon	The 2000 AD Art of Steve Dillon	Various stories from 2000 AD	15" × 19" (381 mm × 483 mm)	978-1-83786-201-6	Jul 2024	144
Arthur Ranson	Button Man	Various Button Man story pages from 2000 AD (Progs 780-791, 904-919 & 1223-1233)	10" × 14" (254 mm × 355 mm)	978-1-83786-271-9	Dec 2024	192
Carlos Ezquerra	Judge Dredd	"The Big Itch!", "Behold the Beast!" and "It's Happening on Line 9" from Judge Dredd Annual 1983; "The Other Slab Tynan" from Judge Dredd Annual 1984; "The Big Bang Theory" and "Tarantula" from Judge Dredd Annual 1985; "John Brown's Body" from Judge Dredd Annual 1986	15" × 19" (381 mm × 483 mm)	978-1-83786-533-8	Nov 2025	128
Joe Colquhoun	Charley's War		15" × 19" (381 mm × 483 mm)	978-1-83786-680-9	Apr 2026	144
Dave Gibbons	The 2000 AD Art of Dave Gibbons	Various stories from 2000 AD	15" × 19" (381 mm × 483 mm)		Nov 2026	128

=== Skybound Entertainment Signature Editions ===
Artist	Title	Material collected	Size	ISBN	Publication date	Pages
Daniel Warren Johnson	Extremity	Extremity #1-12	12" × 17" (305 mm × 432 mm)		Oct 2024	320

=== Slingsby Bros, Ink! ===
Artist	Title	Material collected	Size	ISBN	Publication date	Pages
David Wright	Carol Day: Lance Hallam	Carol Day newspaper strips originally published in the Daily Mail between Jan 11, 1957 and Apr 18, 1957.	19" x 14" (489 mm x 362 mm)	978-0-578-31979-7	Apr 2023	152
David Wright	Carol Day: Jack Slingsby	Carol Day newspaper strips originally published in the Daily Mail between Jun 23, 1964 and Nov 3, 1964.	19" x 14" (489 mm x 362 mm)	979-8-218-31309-8	2024	125

=== Titan Original Art Editions ===
Artist	Title	Material collected	Size	ISBN	Publication date	Pages
Walter Simonson	Alien: The Illustrated Story	Alien: The Illustrated Story	13" × 17" (330 mm × 432 mm)	978-1-78116-130-2	Oct 2012	96
Charles Vess	The Book of Ballads	The Book of Ballads and Sagas #1-4 and material from The Book of Ballads (Tor Books, 2004).	10" × 15" (262 mm × 389 mm)	978-1-78329-442-8	Oct 2017	160
Jack Kirby and Gil Kane	The Prisoner	Two unpublished Marvel adaptations of The Prisoner TV series, both dating from the mid-70's. Jack Kirby's pages are mainly in pencil, with a few inked pages. Gil Kane's pages are pencilled layouts.	13" × 17" (337 mm × 438 mm)	978-1-78586-287-8	Jul 2018	64

=== Wayne Alan Harold Productions Fine Art Editions ===
Artist	Title	Material collected	Size	ISBN	Publication date	Pages
P. Craig Russell	Jungle Book and Other Stories	The King's Ankus, Red Dog, The Spring Running, Siegfried and the Dragon, La Sonnambula and the City of Sleep, Breakdown on the Starship Remembrance	12" × 17" (305 mm × 432 mm)	978-0-9998106-4-4	Oct 2017	148
P. Craig Russell	Salome and Other Stories	Salome, The Clowns (Pagliacci), The Godfather’s Code (Cavalleria Rusticana), Unto This World, Ein Heldentraum, Between Two Worlds	12" × 17" (305 mm × 432 mm)	978-0-9998106-5-1	Nov 2018	132
P. Craig Russell	The Selfish Giant and Other Stories	The Selfish Giant, The Star-Child, The Young King, The Remarkable Rocket, The Devoted Friend, The Nightingale and the Rose	12" × 17" (305 mm × 432 mm)	978-0-9998106-8-2	Jan 2020	128
P. Craig Russell	Symbolist Fantasies and Other Things	Pelléas & Mélisande, Ariane and Bluebeard, The Avatar and The Chimera	12" × 17" (305 mm × 432 mm)	978-1-7357615-2-7	Jan 2022	148

=== Zoop Artist's Editions ===
Artist	Title	Material collected	Size	ISBN	Publication date	Pages
John Paul Leon	The Winter Men	The Winter Men #1-5; The Winter Men Winter Special	12" × 17" (305 mm × 432 mm)		Sep 2022	192
