= P. Craig Russell =

Comic creator

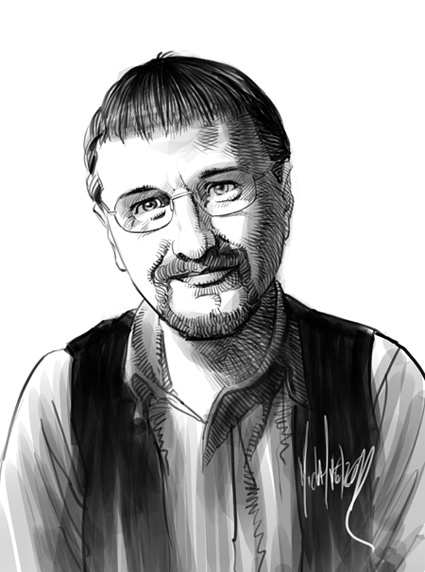
- P. Craig Russell by Michael Netzer, 2005
- Born: Philip Craig Russell; October 30, 1951 (age 75) Wellsville, Ohio
- Areas: Writer, Penciller, Inker

Philip Craig Russell (born October 30, 1951) is an American comics artist, writer, and illustrator. His work has won multiple Harvey and Eisner Awards. Russell was the fourth mainstream comic book creator to come out as openly gay, doing so in 1991, following Andy Mangels in 1988, Craig Hamilton in 1989, and Eric Shanower in 1990, describing himself as "just another left-handed, night-dwelling, gay libertarian cartoonist."

== Biography ==
=== Early life and career ===
Philip Craig Russell was born October 30, 1951, in Wellsville, Ohio. He entered the comics industry in 1972 as an assistant to Dan Adkins. Russell first became well known with his 11–issue Amazing Adventures run and subsequent graphic novel featuring Killraven, hero of a future version of H. G. Wells' The War of the Worlds, collaborating with writer Don McGregor. Comics historian Peter Sanderson wrote that, "McGregor's finest artistic collaborator on the series was P. Craig Russell, whose sensitive, elaborate artwork, evocative of Art Nouveau illustration, gave the landscape of Killraven's America a nostalgic, pastoral feel, and the Martian architecture the look of futuristic castles." At DC Comics, Russell inked Batman stories in Batman Family and Detective Comics over the pencils of Michael Golden and Jim Starlin respectively.

Withdrawing for a while from mainstream comics, Russell produced a number of experimental strips, many of which were later published in his Night Music series and in Epic Illustrated.

=== Elric (1982–1997) ===
Russell's first Elric story, the Roy Thomas scripted "The Dreaming City", was published by Marvel Comics in 1982 as Marvel Graphic Novel #2, following initial publication of the first half of the graphic novel in Epic Illustrated. For the next series, "Elric of Melnibone", also written by Roy Thomas, Russell shared art duties with Michael T. Gilbert. This story was published by Pacific Comics as Elric issues #1–6 in 1983–1984. Russell did not return to Elric until 1997 when he collaborated directly with Michael Moorcock on Elric: Stormbringer, co-published by Dark Horse Comics and Topps Comics.

=== Night Music (1984–1990) ===
In 1984, Russell began Night Music, an ongoing anthology series for Eclipse Comics featuring some of his most heralded literary and operatic adaptations. Russell has previously used the same title for a black and white collection of the earliest of these works, published by Eclipse Comics. Included in this series was "The King's Ankus", adapted from Rudyard Kipling's Jungle Book. Russell had previously inked a number of Jungle Book adaptations drawn by Gil Kane, published in Marvel Fanfare #8–11 (May–Nov. 1983). The series included "Pelleas & Melisande", adapted from Maurice Maeterlinck's play of the same name which had been turned into an opera by Claude Debussy, and "Salome" adapted from Oscar Wilde's play of the same name which was the basis for Richard Strauss's opera. Opera would continue to resurface in Russell's work, including a four-part adaptation of The Magic Flute, taken from Wolfgang Amadeus Mozart's opera.

=== Other works ===
Russell inked Mike Mignola's pencils on the Phantom Stranger limited series in 1987. Russell illustrated issue #50 of writer Neil Gaiman's comic book series The Sandman. The story was titled "Ramadan" and was later included in the collection The Sandman: Fables and Reflections. Russell drew the first story in Gaiman's later Sandman graphic novel, Endless Nights, and adapted both Gaiman's short story "Murder Mysteries" and his children's book Coraline into comics form. He has adapted another Gaiman Sandman work, Sandman: The Dream Hunters, and a Robert E. Howard Conan the Barbarian story, "The Jewels of Gwahlur". Russell got involved with a collaborative art project with the Web-based artist group Kaleidospace in 1994.

In 1991, Kent State University student Michael Mould began translating Ruggero Leoncavallo's opera Pagliacci into English for a comics adaptation, but died on USAir Flight 405 before he could complete it. Marc Andreyko finished Mould's translation as The Clowns, a one-shot written by Russell and illustrated by Galen Showman. Published in 1998 by Dark Horse Comics, The Clowns is dedicated in memory of Mould.

Beginning in 2000, Dark Horse Comics published Russell's adaptation of Richard Wagner's operatic cycle, The Ring of the Nibelung as 14 comic books; in 2001, the series won two Eisner Awards: for Best Finite Series/Limited Series, and for Best Artist/Penciller/Inker or Penciller/Inker Team. The series since been published as a single-volume hardcover book. He has adapted the fairy tales of Oscar Wilde into comic-book albums from NBM Publishing.

In December 2007, Desperado published The Art of P. Craig Russell, a 256-page retrospective of Russell's career. It was nominated for the 2008 Eisner Award for Best Comics-Related Book. A documentary feature about the artist, Night Music: The Art of P. Craig Russell, premiered at the 2008 Mid-Ohio Con in Columbus, Ohio.

In November 2015, Wayne Alan Harold Productions published the P. Craig Russell Sketchbook Archives, a 250-page hardcover art book featuring the best of Russell's personal sketchbooks. The same publisher would go on to create an Artist's Edition-type line of 12" x 17" hardcovers that reproduce Russell's original art at full-size,."

In October 2026, Wayne Alan Harold ran a successful crowdfunding campaign to relaunch Night Music as a series of hardcover graphic albums that will feature all-new stories created by Russell.

== Awards and nominations ==
- 1985: Best Finite Series Kirby Award for Night Music (Nominated)
- 1986: Best Finite Series Kirby Award for Night Music #4–5, "Pelleas and Melisande" (Nominated)
- 1986: Best Artist Kirby Award for Night Music #4–5, "Pelleas and Melisande" (Nominated)
- 1987: Best Single Issue Kirby Award for Night Music #6, "Salome" (Nominated)
- 1993: Best Penciller/Inker, Color Publication Eisner Award for Fairy Tales of Oscar Wilde; Robin 3000; Legends of the Dark Knight: Hothouse (Winner)
- 1993: Inkpot Award
- 1994: Best Penciller/Inker or Penciller/Inker Team Eisner Award for The Sandman #50 (Winner)
- 1995: Best Graphic Album-New Eisner Award for Fairy Tales of Oscar Wilde Vol. 2 (Winner)
- 1998: Best Penciller/Inker or Penciller/Inker Team Eisner Award for Elric: Stormbringer; Dr. Strange: What Is It That Disturbs You, Stephen? (Winner)
- 1999: Best Single Issue Eisner Award for The Clowns (Nominated)
- 2001: Best Penciller/Inker or Penciller/Inker Team Eisner Award for Ring of the Nibelung (Winner)
- 2001: Best Finite Series/Limited Series Eisner Award for Ring of the Nibelung (Winner)
- 2004: Best Short Story Eisner Award for "Death and Venice" in The Sandman: Endless Nights (Winner)
- 2009: Best Publication for Teens/Tweens Eisner Award for Coraline:The Graphic Novel (Winner)
- 2019: Master Cartoonist Award, Cartoon Crossroads Columbus
- 2026: Inkwell Awards Stacey Aragon Special Recognition Award (SASRA)

== Bibliography ==
From early in his career, Russell has numbered his works in the order in which they were drawn, similar to the treatment of works by classical musical composers. The works are usually labeled somewhere within the art with the word "Opus" (or an abbreviation thereof) and its corresponding number.

1. The Chimera (1973)
2. Killraven (1974–1976)
3. Doctor Strange Annual #1 (1976)
4. Dance on a Razor's Edge (1977)
5. Parsifal (1976–77)
6. The Avatar and the Chimera (1978)
7. Siegfried and the Dragon (1978)
8. La Somnanbula (1979)
9. Breakdown on the Starship Remembrance (1979)
10. Elric: The Dreaming City (1979–80)
11. Isolation and Illusion (1981)
12. Elric: While the Gods Laugh (1981)
13. Killraven: Last Dreams Broken (1982)
14. King of the Castle (1982–83)
15. Elric: Elric of Melniboné (1982–84)
16. The Drinking Song of Earth's Sorrow (1984)
17. The Insomniac (1971–84)
18. Unto this World (1984)
19. Jungle Book: The King's Ankus (1984–85)
20. Ein Heldentraum (1985)
21. Pelléas & Mélisande (1985)
22. Elric: The Dreaming City (2nd version, 1986)
23. Salomé (1986)
24. Batman: Robin 3000 (1986–92)
25. Jungle Book: Red Dog (1987)
26. Ariane and Bluebeard (1988)
27. Batman: Gotham by Gaslight (1989, inks over Mike Mignola pencilwork)
28. Human Remains (1989)
29. The Magic Flute (1989–90)
30. From Beyond (1994)
31. The Golden Apples of the Sun (1992)
32. The Gift of the Magi (1990)
33. A Voyage to the Moon (1991)
34. Fairy Tales of Oscar Wilde: The Selfish Giant (1992)
35. Fairy Tales of Oscar Wilde: The Star Child (1992)
36. Batman: Hothouse (1992)
37. The Sandman: Ramadan (1992)
38. Fairy Tales of Oscar Wilde: The Young King (1993)
39. Fairy Tales of Oscar Wilde: The Remarkable Rocket (1993)
40. X: Devils (1994)
41. Jungle Book: Spring Running (1996)
42. Elric: Stormbringer (1993–95)
43. Elric: One Life, Furnished in Early Moorcock (1996)
44. Dr. Strange: What is it that disturbs you, Stephen? (1996) (updated version of Doctor Strange Annual #1)
45. Fairy Tales of Oscar Wilde: The Birthday of the Infanta (1997)
46. The Clowns (1998)
47. Star Wars: Episode 1 – Queen Amidala (1999)
48. The Ring of the Nibelung (2000–2001)
49. Buffy the Vampire Slayer: Tales of the Slayers – Presumption (2002)
50. Fairy Tales of Oscar Wilde: The Devoted Friend (2004)
51. In Flanders Field (2002)
52. Murder Mysteries (2002)
53. Between Two Worlds (2002)
54. The Sandman: Death and Venice (2003)
55. Fairy Tales of Oscar Wilde: Nightingale and the Rose (2004)
56. Gone (2003)
57. Fables: The Last Castle (2003)
58. Hellboy: Weird Tales: Command Performance (2003)
59. The Godfather's Code (2004)
60. Lucifer #50 (2004)
61. Daredevil, vol. 2, #65 (2004)
62. Conan: The Jewels of Gwahlur (2005)
63. Coraline (2008)
64. Hellboy: The Vampire of Prague (2007)
65. Sandman: The Dream Hunters (2008)
66. The Spirit: Art Walk (2011)
67. Fairy Tales of Oscar Wilde: The Happy Prince (2012)
68. Fables: A Delicate Balance (2012)
69. From Arnold Schoenberg’s Pierrot Lunaire: Beheading (2013)
70. Little Nemo in Final Slumberland (2013)
71. Day and Night (Two Songs) (2014) (as yet unpublished)
72. Two Songs by Hugo Wolf (Spring, Autumn) (2014) (as yet unpublished)
73. All-New Invaders #12 (layouts and inking) (2014)
74. The Graveyard Book (2014)
75. The Spectre of the Rose (Two Songs: Serenade, Departure) (2015) (as yet unpublished)
76. Pendant to the Rose (A Symbolist Fantasy) (2016) (as yet unpublished)
77. The Giver (2019)
78. American Gods (2017–2019)
79. The Problem of Susan (2019)
80. Locks (2019)
81. Norse Mythology (2020)
82. The Norse Saga in 24 Panels (2024)
