= Night Music (comic) =

American comic book series

- The cover to Night Music #2, art by P. Craig Russell.

Publication information
- Publisher: Eclipse Comics
- Schedule: Irregular
- Publication date: November 1979 – October 1989
- No. of issues: 1 graphic novel 11 issues

Creative team
- Created by: P. Craig Russell
- Written by: P. Craig Russell
- Artist(s): P. Craig Russell
- Colorist(s): P. Craig Russell
- Editor(s): Cat Yronwoode

Night Music is an American comic book anthology created by artist P. Craig Russell, published by Eclipse Comics. It consists of comic adaptations of operas, novels, classical music and poems, and followed an irregular publishing model that changed formats according to the needs of the material.

== Publication history ==
Russell had collaborated with Don McGregor for Marvel Comics, and the writer put him in contact with the newly-formed Eclipse Enterprises founded by brothers Dean and Jan Mullaney in 1979, following their successful publication of McGregor's graphic novel Sabre: Slow Fade of an Endangered Species. A deal was soon struck allowing Russell to publish his plans for a series of experimental adaptations through Eclipse, while retaining ownership of his submissions. A major factor was the high-quality printing method used by Eclipse for Saber.

=== Graphic novel ===
The first piece in the series was the graphic novel Night Music 1, containing the stories "Breakdown on the Starship Remembrance" and "La Sonnambula", published in November 1979.

=== Comic series ===
In 1984 Russell returned to Eclipse after working for Marvel Comics, and made plans for an ongoing series of Night Music. The series would have a highly unusual structure; while covers and promotion of the various contents would use different titles and numbering, the publisher's indicia would mark it as an edition of the ongoing Night Music series. Russell himself would also number the stories within his 'opus' system, an ongoing personal index of all his works. The first three issues followed a 36-page anthology format, while the second issue was delayed when Russell lost some of the artwork; it continued some of Russell's The Jungle Book adaptation began in Marvel Fanfare. Following this Night Music was reformatted as an umbrella title for various adaptations. Pelleas and Melisandre was promoted as a two-issue micro-series issued bi-weekly in December 1984; each issue had 36 pages and contained half of the adaptation. Salome was issued as a "one-issue micro-series", and Red Dog as a one-shot. For Ariane & Bluebeard the format changed to a 52-page one-shot, and the final adaptation for Eclipse – Mozart's The Magic Flute – consisted of a three-issue prestige format limited series.

Issues	Date	Cover title	Contents
1–3	December 1984 – March 1985	P. Craig Russell's Night Music #1–3	Issue #1 (December 1984): "Breakdown on the Starship Remembrance": Colour version of story from Night Music 1.; "The Drinking Song of Earth's Sorrow": Adaptation of Gustav Mahler's "Das Lied von der Erde".; "Unto This World": Based on a Mahler-inspired poem by Friedrich Rückert.; Issue #2 (February 1985): "Dance on a Razor's Edge": Inspired by the suicide of poet Yukio Mishima.; "La Sonnambula": Adaptation of Vincenzo Bellini's "La sonnambula"; colour version of story from Night Music 1.; "The Insomniac": Based on Richard Wagner's Götterdämmerung.; Issue #3 (March 1985): "The King's Ankus": Adaptation of Rudyard Kipling's novel The Second Jungle Book.
4–5	December 1985	Pelleas & Melisande #1–2	"Pelleas & Melisande": Adaptation of Maurice Maeterlinck's play Pelléas and Mélisande.
6	June 1986	Salome #1	"Salome": Adaptation of Oscar Wilde's play of the same name.
7	February 1988	Red Dog #1	"Red Dog": Adaptation of Rudyard Kipling's short story of the same name.
8	1989	Ariane & Bluebeard #1	52-page one-shot.: "Ariane & Bluebeard": Adaptation of Maurice Maeterlinck's opera Ariane et Barbe-bleue.
9–11	August – October 1990	The Magic Flute Book One – Book Three	Three issue "prestige format" limited series, each 52 pages.: "The Magic Flute": Adaptation of Mozart's opera of the same name.

== Reception ==
The series received consistent critical acclaim. Night Music was nominated for 'Best Finite Series' at the 1985 Kirby Awards, and Pelleas & Melisande was nominated in the same category the following year, but the works would lose out on both occasions to DC Comics' Crisis on Infinite Earths. The latter also earned Russell a nomination as 'Best Artist', but the award went to Steve Rude for Nexus.

Reviewing Salome for Amazing Heroes, R.A. Jones called Russell "one of the most classically adept artists in all of comics" and called the issue "an artistic tour-de-force". The adaptation was also nominated for 'Best Single Issue' at the 1987 Kirbys. John Hartman evaluated Ariane & Bluebeard for Amazing Heroes in 1989, stating "if you have any sense at all, you will buy Ariane & Bluebeard", and declared Russell a "national treasure".
