= Body Bags (comics) =

American comic book series

Cover of the first issue

Body Bags is an American comic book series created, written and illustrated by Jason Pearson.

== Publication history ==
The initial series, simply entitled Body Bags, was a launch title for Dark Horse Comics' Blanc Noir line of books. Produced by Gaijin Studios in 1996, Body Bags includes a large amount of blood, violence and characters who enjoy killing and cursing, which is displayed in a number of scenes in the book that have been deemed "shocking". Pearson's use of an extremely buxom 14-year-old girl caused the series to face a certain amount of controversy in the comics industry, thus Body Bags is promoted as "the most controversial comic of the 1990s". The final issues of the series were delayed for several months because of Jason Pearson falling ill.

Pearson intended to write and pencil a 6-issue follow up to Body Bags, but fell ill during its production and eventually scrapped the series because he didn't like it. The hiatus ended in 2005, when the 2-issue mini-series Body Bags: Father's Day, reprinting the original 4 issues, was released by Image Comics' imprint, 12-Gauge Comics. The follow-up to Father's Day was a 1-shot comic Body Bags: 3 the Hard Way, which was delayed and not released until 2006 by Image Comics, and reprinted all the sporadic appearances the characters made in Dark Horse Presents and Dark Horse Maverick with new coloring, as well as including a new story. A new 1-shot entitled, not unnaturally, Body Bags: One Shot, was scheduled for release in 2006 but was also delayed; it was published in late November, 2008.

Following the death of Pearson in 2022, a crossover miniseries involving Body Bags and Hack/Slash, written and drawn respectively by Hack/Slash's creators Tim Seeley and Stefano Caselli was published by Image Comics starting in October of 2024. Their characterization of Panda is a great deal more unhinged and angry, bordering on psychotic, than she had previously been.

== Plot ==
Set in the fictional city of Terminus, Georgia (which is named after the former name for Atlanta), Body Bags follows the contract-killing exploits of a Hispanic father & daughter team of "body baggers" (assassins) Mack Delgado (a.k.a. "Clownface"), a knife-wielding veteran of the business, and his overzealous and overly-bosomy teenage daughter, Panda. Many of their assignments come from the series' only other recurring character, Sheriff Toni Sinn. Despite the arguing that goes on between teenager Panda and father Mack, Mack is still very protective while Panda constantly fights for her father's respect and permission to set out on jobs with her father and his longtime body-bagging partner, Pops.

The Body Bags story draws similarities to the film Leon a.k.a. The Professional. For example, Panda returns to her father's side after ten years apart, while Mack is looking for a rival body bagger who set him up. Although Mack was reluctant, he allows Panda to help him take care of his rival and later becomes a full-fledged bagger herself.

Their 10-page appearance in Dark Horse Presents ties into the original 4-issue mini-series as the two come under fire from an experimental gun stolen and operated by Geech, a drug dealer whose pregnant wife and unborn child were murdered by Mack in a cowardly act back in the mini-series.

The latest Body Bags installment, entitled 3 the Hard Way, features Panda solely dealing with a corrupt police detective who is really a crime-boss while begrudgingly cleaning out Mack's distinctive hot rod, "Da Boss".

== Appearances ==
- Body Bags (1996, Dark Horse Comics) 4-issue mini-series
  - Body Bags: Father's Day (1997, Dark Horse Comics) Trade-paperback reprinting all 4 issues of mini-series.
  - Body Bags: Father's Day (2005, Image Comics) 2-issue mini-series. reprinting the initial 4-issue mini-series
  - Body Bags: Father's Day (2009, Image Comics) Trade-paperback reprinting the 2-issue reprint comic
- Dark Horse Presents Annual 1997 (1997, Dark Horse Comics) 12-page story 'World Destroyer'
- Dark Horse Maverick 2000 (2000, Dark Horse Comics) 6-page story 'Well It's About Time'
- Body Bags: 3 the Hard Way (2006, Image Comics) 48 page special, 1 new story plus reprints of Dark Horse Maverick 2000 and Dark Horse Presents Annual 1997.
- Body Bags: One Shot (2008, Image Comics) 48 page special
- Hack/Slash: Body Bags (2024-205, Image Comics) 4 issue mini-series
