= Jason Pearson =

American comic book writer (1970–2022)

Jason Trent Pearson
- Born: August 29, 1970 Los Angeles, California, U.S.
- Died: December 19, 2022 (aged 52)
- Areas: Writer, Penciller
- Notable works: Legion of Super-Heroes; Body Bags

Jason Trent Pearson (August 29, 1970 – December 19, 2022) was an American comic book creator, known for his series Body Bags and for his dynamic illustration work on books featuring characters such as the Legion of Super-Heroes, Spider-Man, Batman, and Deadpool. He was one of the founding members of Gaijin Studios.

== Career ==
Jason Pearson's first published comics work was in 1991. His first and longest regular assignment, beginning that year, was working with Keith Giffen on Legion of Super-Heroes with scripters Tom and Mary Bierbaum, and inker Al Gordon. He later described Giffen as one of his mentors.

He developed Body Bags to be part of Ground Zero, an anthology intended for Image Comics, which did not pick it up. He produced a four issue mini-series which served in 1996 as the debut title for the Blanc Noir line of titles produced by Gaijin Studios for Dark Horse Comics. In 1998, he began work on a sequel, which was interrupted by an illness. Body Bags: 3 The Hard Way and Body Bags: One Shot followed in 2005 and 2008. In 2015, Pearson ran a Kickstarter funding campaign for a 96-page story Body Bags: Don't Die Until I Kill You, raising $39,514, nearly double his goal of $20,000. After repeated delays, in 2022 he again promised that publication was imminent.

Meanwhile, he illustrated individual issues and covers for books published by Wildstorm, Marvel, Dark Horse, and Image. He announced that he was writing and drawing a mini-series called Redbird – intended to be the first of a trilogy – in 2004, but the project was not completed.

Pearson died December 19, 2022, of a stroke.

== Bibliography ==
Interior comic work includes:

- Celestial Mechanics: The Adventures of Widget Wilhelmina Jones #3: "You've Opened Heaven's Portal" (with Kurt Wilcken, Innovation, 1991)
- Hero Alliance (Innovation):
  - "Past Perfect" (with Mike Buckley, in Quarterly #1, 1991)
  - "Night Shift" (with Robert Ingersoll, in #16, 1991)
  - "Untitled" (with David Campiti, in #17, 1991)
- Starman #35: "Back to the Fuchsia!" (with Peter David and Keith Giffen, DC Comics, 1991)
- Maze Agency #22: "Magic & Monsters—and Murder" (with Mike W. Barr, Innovation, 1991)
- Justice League Quarterly #4: "The Sunnie Caper" (with Will Jacobs, DC Comics, 1991)
- Legion of Super-Heroes #22–24, 26–30, 32, 34–36, 38 (with Tom Bierbaum, Mary Bierbaum and Keith Giffen, DC Comics, 1991–1992)
- Crusade of Comics Presents: Spawn (with Terry Fitzgerald, one-shot, Gladstone, 1992)
- Green Lantern Corps Quarterly #6: "The Book of Equals" (with Gerard Jones, DC Comics, 1993)
- Vanguard #2 (with Gary Carlson, Image, 1993)
- Namor, the Sub-Mariner Annual #3: "Under the Skin" (with Ron Marz and various artists, Marvel, 1993)
- Uncanny X-Men Annual #17: "The Gift Goodbye" (with Scott Lobdell, Marvel, 1993)
- The Dragon: Blood & Guts #1–3 (script and art, Image, 1995)
- Penthouse Men's Adventure Comix #1–2, 4: "Action Figures" (with George Caragonne and Tom Thornton, Penthouse Comix, 1995)
- Shi: Senryaku #3 (with Gary Cohn and various artists, Crusade, 1995)
- Body Bags (script and art):
  - Body Bags: Father's Day #1–4 (Dark Horse, 1996–1997)
  - "World Destroyer" (in Dark Horse Presents Annual '97, 1998)
  - "Well, It's About Time" (in Dark Horse Maverick, 2000)
  - Body Bags: 3 the Hard Way: "Hit Da Switches" (one-shot, Image, 2005)
  - Body Bags: One Shot (Image, 2008)
- Penthouse Comix #29–30: "Re-Introducing Action Figures" (with George Caragonne, Penthouse, 1998)
- Witchblade #24 (with David Wohl, Christina Z and Randy Green, Top Cow, 1998)
- Grendel: Black, White & Red #4: "Devil's Cage" (with Matt Wagner, Dark Horse, 1999)
- The Batman Chronicles #16: "Two Down" (with Greg Rucka, DC Comics, 1999)
- Buffy the Vampire Slayer #8: "The Final Cut" (with Andi Watson and Cliff Richards, Dark Horse, 1999)
- Batman: Legends of the Dark Knight #118: "Balance" (with Greg Rucka, DC Comics, 1999)
- Batman: Gotham Knights #22: "The Bottom Line" (with Michael Golden, DC Comics, 2001)
- Ultimate Spider-Man Super Special (with Brian Michael Bendis, among other artists, Marvel, 2002)
- X-Men Unlimited #39: "The Final Alternative" (script and art, Marvel, 2003)
- Tom Strong's Terrific Tales #5, 8 (with Alan Moore, America's Best Comics, 2003)
- The Many Worlds of Tesla Strong (with Alan Moore, Peter K. Hogan and various artists, one-shot, Wildstorm, 2003)
- Hellboy: Weird Tales #4: "The Dread Within" (script and art, Dark Horse, 2001)
- Action Comics #805: "The Harvest, Conclusion" (with Joe Kelly and Pasqual Ferry, DC Comics, 2001)
- Eye of the Storm Annual: "Time to Kill" (with Geoff Johns, Wildstorm, 2003)
- Global Frequency #11: "Aleph" (with Warren Ellis, Wildstorm, 2004)
- The Ride #2: "Wheels of Change, Act 4" (with Doug Wagner, Image, 2004)
- Desperado Primer: "A Mirror to the Soul" (with Paul Jenkins and various artists, one-shot, Desperado Publishing, 2005)
- Gun Candy #1: "Mardi Gras, Act 2: Bourbon & Toulouse" (with Chuck Dixon, Image, 2005)
- Welcome to Tranquility #8: "The Ferocious Lindo Sisters in: What You Really Want!" (with Gail Simone and Neil Googe, Wildstorm, 2007)
- Robin Annual #7: "The Festival of the Hungry Ghosts" (with Keith Champagne, DC Comics, 2007)
- Joker's Asylum: Penguin (with Jason Aaron, one-shot, DC Comics, 2008)
- Punisher Annual #1: "Remote Control" (with Rick Remender, Marvel, 2009)
- X-Force Annual #1 (with Robert Kirkman, Marvel, 2010)
- Deadpool: Wade Wilson's War #1–4 (with Duane Swierczynski, Marvel, 2010)
- Astonishing X-Men #36–37: "Monstrous" (with Daniel Way, Marvel, 2011)

=== Covers only ===
- Justice Machine #6 (Innovation, 1991)
- Spider-Femme 2088 #1 (Personality, 1993)
- X-Babes 2088 #1 (Personality, 1993)
- Valor #11 (DC Comics, 1993)
- Exiles #4 (Malibu, 1993)
- Catalyst: Agents of Change #1–7 (Dark Horse, 1994)
- Out of the Vortex #5 (Dark Horse, 1994)
- Hellhounds: Panzer Cops #3, 5 (Dark Horse, 1994)
- Gen^{13} #1 (Wildstorm, 1994)
- Sunglasses After Dark #3–5 (Verotik, 1996)
- Penthouse Comix #14, 18 (Penthouse, 1996)
- Ghost v1 #19 (Dark Horse, 1996)
- Robin #45, 61, 65–70, 72, 121–125 (DC Comics, 1997–2004)
- Voodoo #1 (Image, 1997)
- Body Doubles #1 (DC Comics, 1998)
- Dark Nemesis #1 (DC Comics, 1998)
- Darkseid #1 (DC Comics, 1998)
- Gog #1 (DC Comics, 1998)
- Mr. Mxyzptlk #1 (DC Comics, 1998)
- Prometheus #1 (DC Comics, 1998)
- Scarecrow #1 (DC Comics, 1998)
- The Rogues #1 (DC Comics, 1998)
- Generation X #35–36 (Marvel, 1998)
- X-Men #73 (Marvel, 1998)
- Batman: Legends of the Dark Knight #109–111, 159–161 (DC Comics, 1998–2003)
- Ghost v2 #7, 16–17 (Dark Horse, 1999–2000)
- The Dirty Pair: Start the Violence #1 (Dark Horse, 1999)
- Xena: Warrior Princess #6–9 (Dark Horse, 2000)
- Gen-Active #2 (Wildstorm, 2000)
- Jet #1–4 (Wildstorm, 2000–2001)
- Superman/Tarzan: Sons of the Jungle TPB (Dark Horse, 2002)
- The Amazing Spider-Man v2 #40–42 (Marvel, 2002)
- Hellboy: Weird Tales #2 (Dark Horse, 2003)
- Xin: Journey of the Monkey King #3 (Anarchy Studio, 2003)
- Galactic #1–3 (Dark Horse, 2003)
- Thundercats: Dogs of War #1 (Wildstorm, 2003)
- Stormwatch: Team Achilles #17–23 (Wildstorm, 2004)
- The Amazing Spider-Man v1 #502 (Marvel, 2004)
- H.E.R.O. #16–18 (DC Comics, 2004)
- Birds of Prey #75–77 (DC Comics, 2004–2005)
- The Ride: Foreign Parts #1 (Image, 2005)
- Wetworks #3 (Wildstorm, 2007)
- Midnighter #3 (Wildstorm, 2007)
- The Ride: Die Valkyrie #1 (Image, 2007)
- The Loners #1–6 (Marvel, 2007–2008)
- New Avengers/Transformers #2 (Marvel, 2007)
- Black Panther #39–41 (Marvel, 2008)
- Moon Knight #21 (Marvel, 2008)
- Deadpool #4–25 (Marvel, 2009–2010)
- Destroyer #1–5 (Marvel, 2009)
- Ultimate Comics: Enemy #1 (Marvel, 2010)
- Vampirella #4 (Dynamite, 2011)
- Deadpool Family #1 (Marvel, 2011)
- Astonishing X-Men #39 (Marvel, 2011)
- New Mutants #30, 32–33, 35 (Marvel, 2011–2012)
- X-Men v3 #15.1 (Marvel, 2011)

Preceded by Dusty Abell	Legion of Super-Heroes artist (with layouts by Keith Giffen); 1991	Succeeded by Stuart Immonen
