= David Wright (artist) =

British illustrator

A c. 1965 Carol Day daily comic strip panel by David Wright (strip #2795), © Patrick Wright. Carol and a beau are shown.

David Wright (12 December 1912 – 25 May 1967) was a British illustrator who drew a series of "lovelies" that epitomised female glamour during World War II. He also created the Carol Day cartoon strip for the Daily Mail in 1956, creating a soap opera style of comic strip that paralleled similar work in the USA.

However, it is his series of 169 illustrations for The Sketch magazine (from 1941 to 1951) that became most popular. In the 1950s he continued drawing in a similar style for Men Only.

Wright started work at his uncle's studio after leaving school, later becoming the fashion illustrator for a number of women's magazines. He was commissioned in 1941 to draw a series of glamorous women for The Sketch, most of whom were modelled on his wife Esme. The illustrations established him as one of the most popular pin-up artists during World War II. During the war he worked as a driving instructor for the armed forces in Abersoch, Wales, which left him plenty of time to continue his illustration work.
