= The Happy Prince and Other Tales =

1888 collection of fairytales by Oscar Wilde

- First Edition cover (1888)
- Author: Oscar Wilde
- Illustrator: Walter Crane, George Percy Jacomb-Hood
- Language: English
- Subject: Children's literature
- Genre: Short stories
- Publisher: David Nutt
- Publication date: 1 May 1888
- Publication place: United Kingdom
- Pages: 117
- Text: The Happy Prince and Other Tales at Wikisource

The Happy Prince and Other Tales (or Stories) is a collection of bedtime stories for children by Oscar Wilde, first published in May 1888. It contains five stories that are highly popular among children and frequently read in schools: "The Happy Prince," "The Nightingale and the Rose," "The Selfish Giant," "The Devoted Friend," and "The Remarkable Rocket." The short stories are valued for their morals, and have been made into animated films. In 2003, the second through fourth stories were adapted by Lupus Films and Terraglyph Interactive Studios into the three-part series Wilde Stories for Channel 4. The stories are regarded as classics of children's literature.

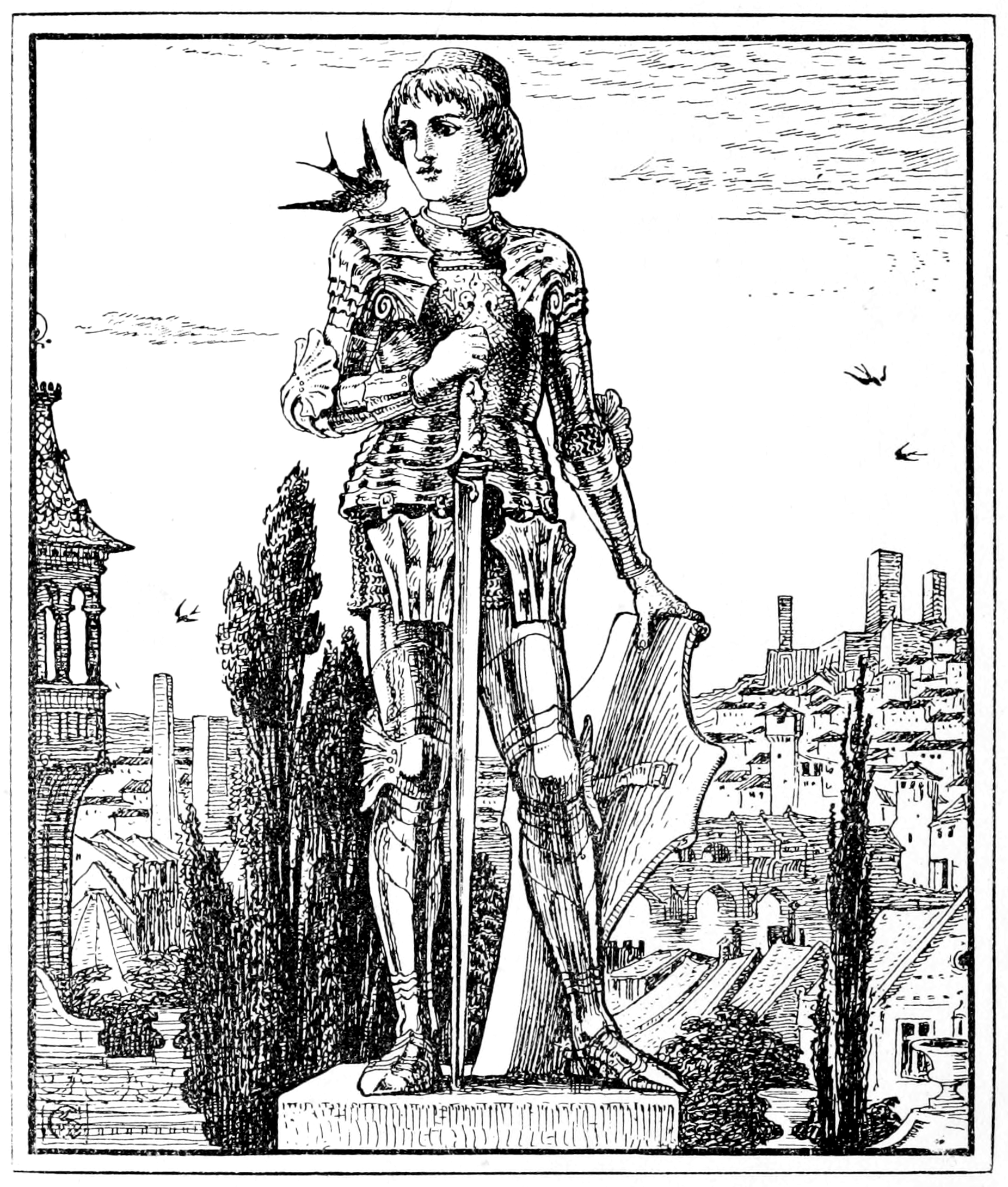
Plate by Walter Crane illustrating the short story "The Happy Prince", in Wilde's The Happy Prince and Other Tales. London: Nutt. 1st edition

== Contents ==
=== The Happy Prince ===
In a town full of suffering poor people, a swallow who was left behind after his flock flew off to Egypt for the winter meets the statue of the late "Happy Prince", who has never experienced true sorrow, for he lived in a palace where sorrow was not allowed to enter. Viewing various scenes of people suffering in poverty from his tall monument, the Happy Prince asks the swallow to take the ruby from his hilt, the sapphires from his eyes, and the gold leaf covering his body to give to the poor. As winter comes and the Happy Prince is stripped of all of his beauty, his lead heart breaks when the swallow dies as a result of his selfless deeds and severe cold. The people, unaware of their good deeds, take the statue down from the pillar due to its shabbiness (intending to replace it with one of the Mayor) and melt the metal in a furnace, leaving behind the broken heart and the dead swallow, which are thrown in a dust heap. These are taken up to heaven by an Angel that has deemed them the two most precious things in the city. This is affirmed by God, and they live forever in His "city of gold" and garden of Paradise.

==== Adaptations ====
- A radio drama adaption by Columbia Workshop was broadcast on 26 December 1936.
- In 1941 Orson Welles and The Mercury Theatre broadcast a version on their "Christmas Show," with music by Bernard Herrmann.
- Another radio version was broadcast in the Philco Radio Hall of Fame on 24 December 1944. This featured Orson Welles (narrator), Bing Crosby (as The Prince) and Lurene Tuttle as The Swallow.
- A record album called The Happy Prince was recorded on 21 August 1945 and issued in 1946 by American Decca Records, with Orson Welles narrating and Bing Crosby as the Prince.
- In 1968 the British group Bee Gees published the song "When the Swallows Fly" with clear references to "The Happy Prince".
- In 1969 New Zealand group the La De Da's released an album The Happy Prince, as a rock opera based on the story. Band members Bruce Howard and Trevor Wilson had conceived the idea in 1967, composing the music with Australian poet Adrian Rawlins narrating parts of Wilde's story.
- Canadian producer Michael Mills, created an animated film adaptation of the story in 1974 starring Glynis Johns as the swallow and Christopher Plummer as the Prince.
- In 1975, Wako Productions produced the educational anime film Shiawase no Ōji, directed by Yoshiyuki Tomino, which was screened in kindergartens and elementary schools across Japan for educational purposes and was not given a general public release.
- In 1976, the anthology anime series Manga Fairy Tales of the World adapted the story in its eighth episode.
- A major story arc in Journey to the West II presented the tale as the backstory of two antagonists. The Python Demon Queen (Angie Cheong) who is in love with the Interconnected-Arm Gibbon (Derek Kok), explained that she was once a swallow besotted with his statue of gold, and later helped the suffering commoners by stripping the statue of its treasures and distributing it.
- In 1984 the Happy Prince was included in the Marshall Cavendish Part works; Story Teller, Illustrated by (Peter Dennis) and read by (Tim Curry)
- In 1996, a stop-motion animated opera produced by CASE Television Productions and Channel 4 Schools, starring William Dazeley as the Happy Prince, Jimmy Somerville as the Swallow, and Nigel Hawthorne as the narrator.
- Happily Ever After: Fairy Tales for Every Child presented a version of the title story set in New York City featuring Ed Koch as the Happy Prince (who was the statue of the city's previous mayor) and Cyndi Lauper as a streetwise pigeon named "Pidge" (in place of the Swallow).
- Leo the Lion Records released a reading of the story performed by Richard Kiley on a recording (#GD01603) including a dramatization of "The Magic Fishbone" by Charles Dickens featuring Julie Harris and Ian Martin and a reading of Rudyard Kipling's story "The Potted Princess" performed by Ms. Harris.
- McDull, Prince de la Bun was partially based on this story.
- Music for Oscar Wilde's "Happy Prince" from his book "The Happy Prince and Other Tales", composed by Edvard Schiffauer, c.2000
- In 2012 the Irish composer Vincent Kennedy and playwright John Nee adapted the story for narrator, chorus and orchestra. "The Happy Prince" was premiered in County Donegal, Ireland, in April 2012 with Nee narrating and acting and Kennedy conducting and performing. It was broadcast on RTÉ Jr Radio.
- The visual novel Sakura no Uta makes various references to "The Happy Prince".

=== The Nightingale and the Rose ===
This story is an allegory of the moral decay and materialism of the age.

A nightingale overhears a student complaining that the professor's daughter will not dance with him, as he is unable to give her a red rose; a lizard, a butterfly and a daisy laugh at the student for doing so. The nightingale visits all the rose-trees in the garden, and one of the roses tells her there is a way to produce a red rose, but only if the nightingale is prepared to sing the sweetest song for the rose all night with her heart pressing into a thorn, sacrificing her life. Seeing the student in tears, and valuing his human life above her bird life, the nightingale carries out the ritual and dies painfully. The student takes the rose to the professor's daughter, but she again rejects him because the Chamberlain's nephew has sent her some real jewels, and "everybody knows that jewels cost far more than flowers." The student angrily throws the rose into the gutter, returns to his study of metaphysics, and decides not to believe in true love anymore.

==== Adaptations ====
There are many adaptations of this story in the form of operas and ballets. These include:

- A cantata by Henry Hadley, an American composer and conductor, The Nightingale and the Rose, libretto E. W. Grant, Op. 54, S, SSAA, orchestra (New York, 1911)
- An opera by Hooper Brewster-Jones, an Australian composer, The Nightingale and the Rose, 1927, of which only an orchestral suite survives.
- A ballet by English composer Harold Fraser-Simson, The Nightingale and the Rose, (based on Wilde) (1927)
- One-act opera Rosa rossa, Op. 18, by Italian composer Renzo Rinaldo Bossi (1883–1965), libretto by Bossi, after Wilde: The Nightingale and the Rose, Radio Turin, 9 August 1938; staged Teatro Regio (Parma), 9 January 1940.
- A ballet by Latvian-Canadian composer Jānis Kalniņš, Lakstigala un roze [The Nightingale and the Rose], Riga, 1938
- An opera by British composer Jonathan Rutherford, The Nightingale and the Rose, 1966
- One-act opera by American composer Margaret Garwood, The Nightingale and the Rose, libretto by Garwood, Chester, Widener College Alumni Auditorium, 21 October 1973
- One-act chamber opera by Russian composer Elena Firsova, The Nightingale and the Rose, Op. 46 (1991), libretto by Firsova, premiered 8 July 1994 at Almeida Theatre, Almeida Opera
- One-act ballet by South African composer David Earl, The Nightingale and the Rose, 1983
- A short film adaptation by Del Kathryn Barton with filmmaker Brenda Fletcher in 2015 that was screened at the Melbourne Writer's Festival
- A one-act opera by Philip Hagemann written in 2003.

=== The Selfish Giant ===
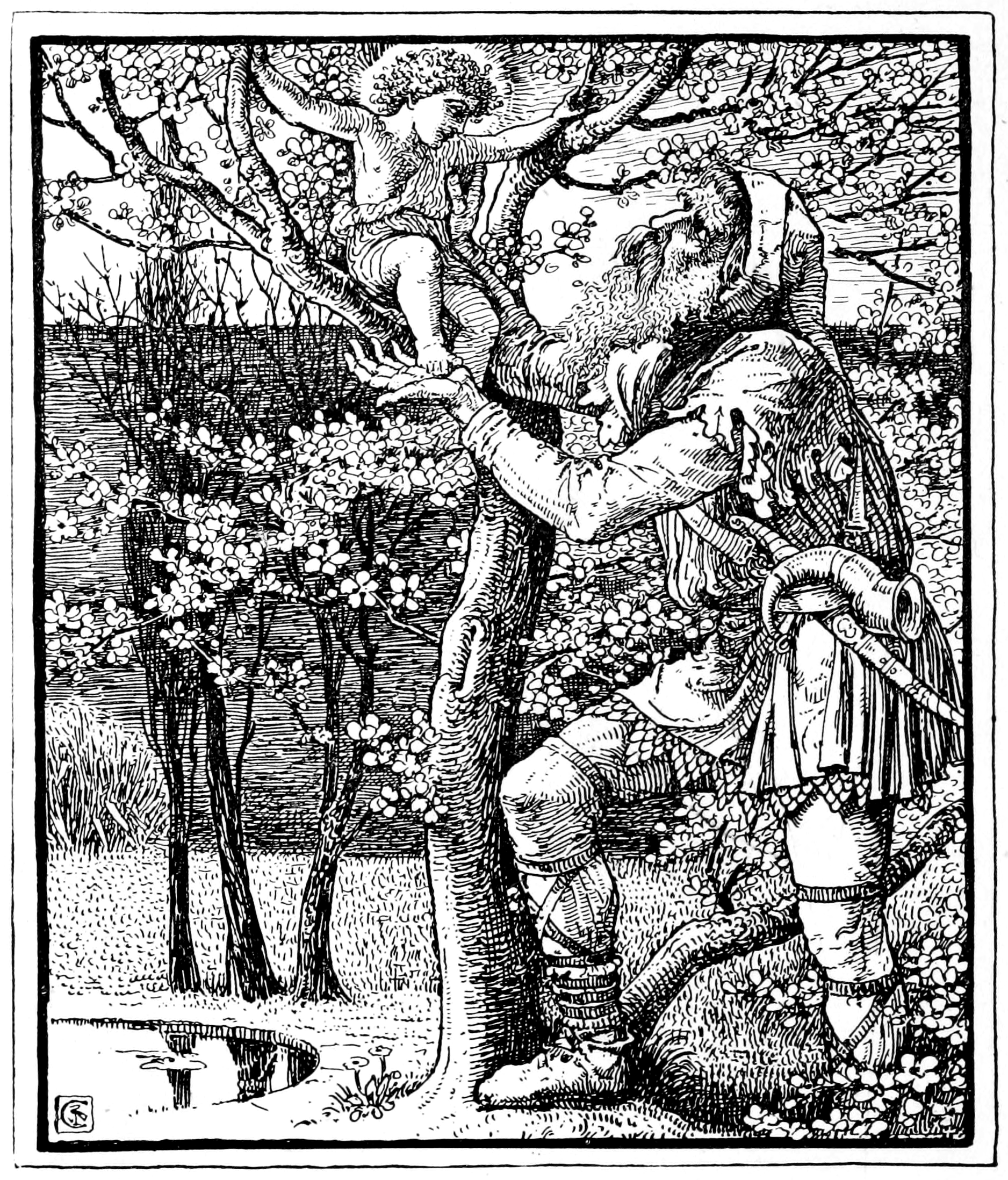
Plate 2 for the first edition by Walter Crane

The Selfish Giant owns a beautiful garden which has 12 peach trees and lovely fragrant flowers, in which children love to play after returning from school. On the giant's return after visiting his friend the Cornish Ogre for seven years, he takes offence at the children and builds a wall to keep them out. He puts up a notice board "TRESPASSERS WILL BE PROSECUTED." The garden falls into perpetual winter. One day, the giant is awakened by a linnet, and discovers that spring has returned to the garden, as the children have found a way in through a gap in the wall. He sees the error of his ways, and resolves to destroy the wall. However, when he emerges from his castle, all the children run away except for one boy who was trying to climb a tree. The giant helps this boy into the tree and announces: "It is your garden now, little children," and knocks down the wall. The children once more play in the garden, and Spring returns. But the boy that the Giant helped does not return, and the Giant is heartbroken. Many years later, after happily playing with the children all the time, the Giant is old and feeble. One winter morning, he awakes to see the trees in one part of his garden in full blossom. He descends from the castle to discover the boy that he once helped standing beneath a beautiful white tree. The Giant sees that the boy bears the stigmata. He does not realise that the boy is actually the Christ Child and is furious that somebody has wounded him.

"Who hath dared to wound thee?" cried the Giant; "tell me, that I may take my big sword and slay him."

"Nay!" answered the child; "but these are the wounds of Love."

"Who are you?" said the Giant, and a strange awe fell on him, and he knelt before the little child.

And the child smiled on the Giant, and said to him, "You let me play once in your garden, to-day you shall come with me to my garden, which is Paradise."

Shortly afterwards, the happy giant dies. That same afternoon, his body is found lying under the tree, covered in blossoms.

==== Adaptations ====
- English singer and composer Liza Lehmann wrote the recitation The Selfish Giant in 1911.
- English light music composer Eric Coates wrote the orchestral Phantasy The Selfish Giant in 1925. In 1933–1934, violinist-composer Jenő Hubay adapted the story into a Hungarian language opera, Az önző óriás (Der selbstsüchtige Riese), Op. 124. The libretto was written by László Márkus and Jenő Mohácsi.
- A record album was produced in the 1940s by American Decca, narrated by Fredric March, with a full unnamed supporting cast.
- In 1971, Peter Sander wrote and produced an animated version of The Selfish Giant for CTV in Canada. The music was by Ron Goodwin. It was nominated at the 44th Academy Awards (1972) in the Animated Short Subject category, one of only three films to receive a nomination. It was first broadcast in November that year.
- In 1977, the story was adapted in episode 15 of the anthology anime series Manga Fairy Tales of the World.
- In the 1990s, the Australian team of composer Graeme Koehne and choreographer Graeme Murphy created a children's ballet based on The Selfish Giant.
- In 1992, the cartoonist P. Craig Russell adapted the story for Volume 1 of "Fairy Tales of Oscar Wilde", which also includes "The Star Child."
- In 1995 Richard Jeffrey-Gray composed a children's opera version, commissioned by Pied Piper and first performed at St George's, Brandon Hill, UK. With a faithful libretto by Alison Dodd it was conceived as a weekend workshop and chamber version. This is recorded with narration, not required in the stage work, spoken by Christopher Walker. The chamber version is on YouTube.
- In the 1997 film Wilde, based on the life of the author, portions of The Selfish Giant are woven in, with Wilde and his wife telling the story to their children, the portions reflecting on his relationship with them and others: the sadness of the children who can no longer play in the giant's garden is reflected in that of Wilde's sons as their beloved father spends more time with his lovers than with them.
- In 2010, UK composer Howard Goodall wrote a version, to a commission from the Brighton Festival, for narrator, children's choir and orchestra.
- An illustrated and abridged version was published in 2013 by Alexis Deacon.
- The Selfish Giant is a 2013 British drama film directed by Clio Barnard, inspired by and loosely based on the Oscar Wilde story.
- In 2014, the story was adapted as a South Korean musical stage by June Young Soh, the musical was a global project involving talents from different countries starring T-ara's Boram, Kim Tae Woo and French actor Jerome Collet. The musical was also very successful and sold out every showing.
- In 2018, English songwriter Guy Chambers adapted the story into a folk opera
- In 2026, Slingsy theatre premiered a stage version of the story "The Giant's Garden" at the Adelaide Festival adapted by Ursula Dubosarsky.

=== The Devoted Friend ===
Once upon a time, there was a kind and honest man named Hans. He lived alone in a tiny cottage.

Hans was a little man who owned a beautiful garden, where he grew flowers of all kinds and colours which were sold in the market to make some money. He enjoyed the company of another man called Hugh, a miller who used to visit Hans very often during the summer time and with whom he shared thoughts about friendship and loyalty. Hans was so devoted to Hugh that he even gifted him whole bunches of flowers from his own garden.

However, when winter came, Hans found himself in a very difficult situation, as his flowers wouldn't flourish anymore until the following spring, meaning that he was impoverished, living on a simple diet of a few pears and hard nuts. That winter was so stark that he had to sell some of his useful gardening tools, including his wheelbarrow, a silver chain, his pipe and some silver buttons. Meanwhile, the miller lived comfortably in his own house and avoided visiting his friend or helping him in any way, not to make him jealous and spoil, if not break, their friendship.

Finally, Spring came, and it was time for Hans to sell some of his primroses in order to buy back his silver buttons. Hugh finally visits him, and, hearing about his problem, he decides to kindly gift him his old, broken wheelbarrow in exchange for a few favours. Hans naively accepts the deal, but the unceasing requests of the miller keeps him busy to the point that he cannot tend his garden.

One day, Hans was asked to go and seek a doctor for Hugh's son, who had hurt himself, but as it was a stormy and rainy night, he could barely see where he was going. After finding the doctor, on the way back home, he gets lost and drowns in a hole full of water.

Hugh, exaggerating his sadness, attends Hans's funeral, and the linnet's story is concluded with the following sentence: "'A great loss to me at any rate,' answered the Miller; 'why, I had as good as given him my wheelbarrow, and now I really don't know what to do with it. It is very much in my way at home, and it is in such bad repair that I could not get anything for it if I sold it. I will certainly take care not to give away anything again. One always suffers for being generous.'"

The water-rat, however, is unmoved by the story, saying that he would rather have not had listened to it, and disappears into his home.

This story has been adapted for comics by the cartoonist P. Craig Russell, in Volume 4 of "Fairy Tales of Oscar Wilde," which also includes "The Nightingale and the Rose."

=== The Remarkable Rocket ===
This story concerns a firework, who is one of many to be let off at the wedding of a prince and princess. The rocket is extremely pompous and self-important, and denigrates all the other fireworks, eventually bursting that into tears to demonstrate his "sensitivity." As this makes him wet, he fails to ignite and, the next day, is thrown away into a ditch. He still believes he is destined for great public importance, and treats a frog, dragonfly, and duck that meet him with appropriate disdain. Two boys find him and use him as fuel for their camp-fire. The rocket is finally lit and explodes, but nobody observes him – the only effect he has is to frighten a goose with his falling stick.

"The Remarkable Rocket," unlike the other stories in the collection, contains a large number of Wildean epigrams:

"Conversation, indeed!" said the Rocket. "You have talked the whole time yourself. That is not conversation."

"Somebody must listen," answered the Frog, "and I like to do all the talking myself. It saves time, and prevents arguments."

"But I like arguments," said the Rocket.

"I hope not," said the Frog complacently. "Arguments are extremely vulgar, for everybody in good society holds exactly the same opinions."

== See also ==
- Music based on the works of Oscar Wilde
- A House of Pomegranates
- Mary Pickford
