= Hellboy: Weird Tales =

Comic book series featuring Hellboy

- Issue #1 cover

Publication information
- Publisher: Dark Horse Comics
- Format: Limited series
- Genre: Horror
- Publication date: February 2003 - April 2004
- No. of issues: 8
- Main characters: Hellboy; Kate Corrigan; Abe Sapien; Liz Sherman; Roger; Lobster Johnson

Creative team
- Created by: Mike Mignola
- Written by: Various
- Artist: Various
- Editor: Scott Allie

Collected editions
- 'Hellboy: Weird Tales Volume 1': ISBN 978-1-56971-622-9
- 'Hellboy: Weird Tales Volume 2': ISBN 978-1-56971-953-4

Hellboy: Weird Tales is a Dark Horse Comics bimonthly eight-issue comic book limited series that offered a variety of guest writers and artists the chance to give their own take on the Hellboy characters created by Mike Mignola whilst he was in Prague working on the first Hellboy movie. The issues were published bi-monthly to alternate with a series of B.P.R.D. one-shots and were collected in two trade paperback volumes.

== Issues ==
=== Issue #1 ===
Published February 26, 2003. Cover by John Cassaday.

Title	Creators
Big-Top Hellboy	Story & Art: John Cassaday
Hellboy, Sherman and Sapien go to the site of a spectral circus in Marktleuthen, Germany, 1994 that has been abducting children in revenge for its destruction at the hand of the local villagers at the turn of the 20th century.
Sugar Coated Wire feat. Dr. Karl Ruprect Kroenen	Art: TyRuben Ellingson
The first comic book pinup by Ellingson who worked alongside Mignola as designer on the movies Blade II and Hellboy.
Party Pooper	Story & Art: Andi Watson
Corrigan distracts Hellboy whilst Sherman, Sapien and Roger prepare a surprise birthday party complete with pancakes but reflected in the candle Hellboy sees a demonic presence and the Crown of Destruction.
Children of the Black Mound	Story: Fabian Nicieza; Art: Stefano Raffaele
An Orthodox priest in Tbilisi, Georgia, 1898, relates the cautionary tale of Staynivolk, which fell victim to Baba Yaga in 1788 for renouncing its faith, to a seminary student Iosif Vissarionovich Dzhugashvili who goes on to face the Russian witch.
Doc Hollow's Grand Vibro-Destructo Machine: Episode 1	Story & Art: John Cassaday
Johnson attempts to apprehend the Crimson Hood but he uses trickery to escape.

=== Issue #2 ===
Published April 23, 2003. Cover by Jason Pearson.

Title	Creators
Lloyd McCay in Flight Risk	Story: Joe Casey; Art: Steve Parkhouse
Hellboy accompanies Lloyd McCay to Nevada, U.S.A. where an attempt to regain his freestyle jet-packing altitude record leads to an encounter with legion of giant desert bats.
Hot	Story: Randy Stradley; Art: Seung Kim
Hellboy and Hennessey travel to Shuzenji, Japan, 1967 to rid the Fukushima hot spring of a Tengu infestation that has been devouring tourists.
Curse of the Haunted Doily	Story: Mark Ricketts; Art: Eric Wight
A family heirloom brings back the ghost of Corrigan’s mother to nag her from beyond the grave.
Midnight Cowboy	Story: Eric Powell; Art: Eric & Robin Powell
A young Hellboy and his dog Mac penetrate the forbidden Hangar 7 at their airforce base home in New Mexico, U.S.A., 1947 to make a transforming discovery.
Doc Hollow's Grand Vibro-Destructo Machine: Episode 2	Story & Art: John Cassaday
Johnson interrogates one of the Crimson Hood’s henchman to reveal the villains location.

=== Issue #3 ===
Published June 25, 2003. Cover by Alex Maleev.

Title	Creators
Still Born	Story: Matt Hollingsworth & Alex Maleev; Art: Alex Maleev
Hellboy, Sapien and Sherman rush to hospital to preside over a demonic birth.
Down Time	Story & Art: Bob Fingerman
Hellboy suffers from technical difficulties after insulting the B.R.P.D’s new intern demon, Irving Goblinski.
Hellboy v. Rasputin	Art: Galen Showman
Full page pin-up.
Family Story	Story: Sara Ryan; Art: Steve Lieber
Hellboy finds himself in the midst of a domestic disturbance whilst researching in the library of a stately home.
Hellboy at the Mountains of Madness	Art: William Stout
Full page pin-up.
Doc Hollow's Grand Vibro-Destructo Machine: Episode 3	Story & Art: John Cassaday
Johnson tracks down his kidnapped assistant to a mansion in upstate New York.

=== Issue #4 ===
Published August 27, 2003. Cover by Leinil Francis Yu.

Title	Creators
The Dread Within	Story & Art: Jason Pearson
Sherman, Ipswich and Apon go to confront the ghosts in a haunted house in Portland, Oregon, on the anniversary of the death of Sherman’s parents.
Abe Sapien: Star of the B.P.R.D.	Story: John Arcudi; Art: Roger Langridge
A day dreaming Sapien imagines an alternate universe where he has taken Hellboy’s place as the B.P.R.D’s top agent.
Haunted	Story: Tom Sniegoski; Art: Ovi Nedelecu
Hellboy goes to the Ravenschild Estate to investigate a reported haunting.
Shred	Art: Rick Cortes
Full page pin-up.
Doc Hollow's Grand Vibro-Destructo Machine: Episode 4	Story & Art: John Cassaday
Johnson bust up a meeting between the Crimson Hood and his Nazi contacts.

=== Issue #5 ===
Published October 15, 2003. Cover by J.H. Williams III.

Title	Creators
Love is Scarier Than Monsters	Story: JH Williams III & Haden Blackman; Art: JH Williams III
Hellboy and FBI Agent Emma Granger go on stakeout in Prince George's County, Maryland to capture the Goatman.
Cool Your Head	Story & Art: Scott Morse
Hellboy goes on holiday to Yosemite National Park, California where he runs in to an aging beatnik.
Shattered	Story: Ron Marz; Art: Jim Starlin
Hellboy travels to Guatemala, 1979 to recover a mysterious Mayan ruins artifact known as the Xul Chalak, After gripping with a madman and a giant frog creature.
Pinup	Art: Cameron Stewart
Full page pin-up.
Doc Hollow's Grand Vibro-Destructo Machine: Episode 5	Story & Art: John Cassaday
Johnson unmasks the true identity of the villainous Crimson Hood.

=== Issue #6 ===
Published December 10, 2003, Cover by Frank Cho.

Title	Creators
Command Performance	Story: Will Pfeifer; Art: P. Craig Russell
Hellboy travels to Paris 1991 to end the murderous run of the Grand Guignol Theater Troupe.
Friday	Story: Doug Petrie; Art: Gene Colan
Sherman and Sapien go after a demon in an aquarium.
My Vacation in Hell	Story & Art: Craig Thompson
Hellboy introduces a slideshow of his holiday in Hell.
Pinup	Art: Steve Purcell
Full page pin-up.
Doc Hollow's Grand Vibro-Destructo Machine: Episode 6	Story & Art: John Cassaday
Johnson battles the Nazis but in the ensuing chaos the vibration machine starts-up.

=== Issue #7 ===
Published February 11, 2004 cover by Phil Noto.

Title	Creators
A Love Story	Story & Art: Tommy Lee Edwards
Hellboy travels to India, 1964 to investigate a restored World War II era P-40 plane that appears haunted.
Theater of the Dead	Story: Jim Pascoe & Tom Fassbender; Art: Simeon Wilkins
Hellboy and Sapien face a gun toting headless corpse, a zombie orchestra, and a bunch of gangsters.
Long Distance Caller	Story & Art: Kev Walker
Krauss deals with the alien takeover of an Australian SETI station whilst on an insomnia-driven astral journey.
Pinup	Art: Dave Stevens
Full page pin-up.
Doc Hollow's Grand Vibro-Destructo Machine: Episode 7	Story & Art: John Cassaday
The vibration machine brings the building crashing down around Johnson and his assistant.

=== Issue #8 ===
Published April 14, 2004 cover by Michael William Kaluta.

Title	Creators
Fifteen Minutes...	Story & Art: Jill Thompson
A group of living skeletons sign-up to be set decoration for Hellboy’s battle with a giant rat in order to get their S.A.G. cards.
Toy Soldier	Story: Akira Yoshida & Kia Asamiya; Art: Kia Asamiya
Hellboy and Sasaki attempt to rid the Dai Bang toy company of the child spirits in its warehouse.
Professional Help	Story & Art: Evan Dorkin
A mission to Oslo, Norway with Agent Izzy Kemper leaves Roger seeking the services of psychiatrist Dr. Ramsey.
Pinup	Art: Gary Fields
Full page pin-up.
Doc Hollow's Grand Vibro-Destructo Machine: Episode 8	Story & Art: John Cassaday
Johnson and his assistant escape the collapsing building but the Nazis get away. Johnson vows to pursue them to Hunte Castle, Austria.

== Collected editions ==
The series has been collected into two trade paperbacks and one hardcover / trade paperback edition:

- Volume 1 (collects Hellboy: Weird Tales #1-4, December 17, 2003, ISBN 978-1-56971-622-9)
- Volume 2 (collects Hellboy: Weird Tales #5-8, October 27, 2004, ISBN 978-1-56971-953-4)
- Hellboy: Weird Tales (Hardcover, collects Hellboy: Weird Tales #1-8 (Volume 1 & 2) and the "How Koshchei Became Deathless" and "Baba Yaga's Feast" back-ups from Hellboy: The Wild Hunt #2-4, December 26, 2014, ISBN 978-1-61655-510-8)
- Hellboy: Weird Tales (Trade paperback, collects Hellboy: Weird Tales #1-8 (Volume 1 & 2, except "Toy Soldier") and the "How Koshchei Became Deathless" and "Baba Yaga's Feast" back-ups from Hellboy: The Wild Hunt #2-4, December 20, 2022, ISBN 978-1-5067-3384-5)

== Awards ==
- The character Hellboy in Hellboy: Weird Tales was nominated for the 2003 "Favourite Hero" Wizard Fan Award.
- John Cassady won the 2004 "Best Artist/Penciller/Inker" Eisner Award in part for his work on this title.
