= The Remarkable Rocket =

Fairytale by Oscar Wilde

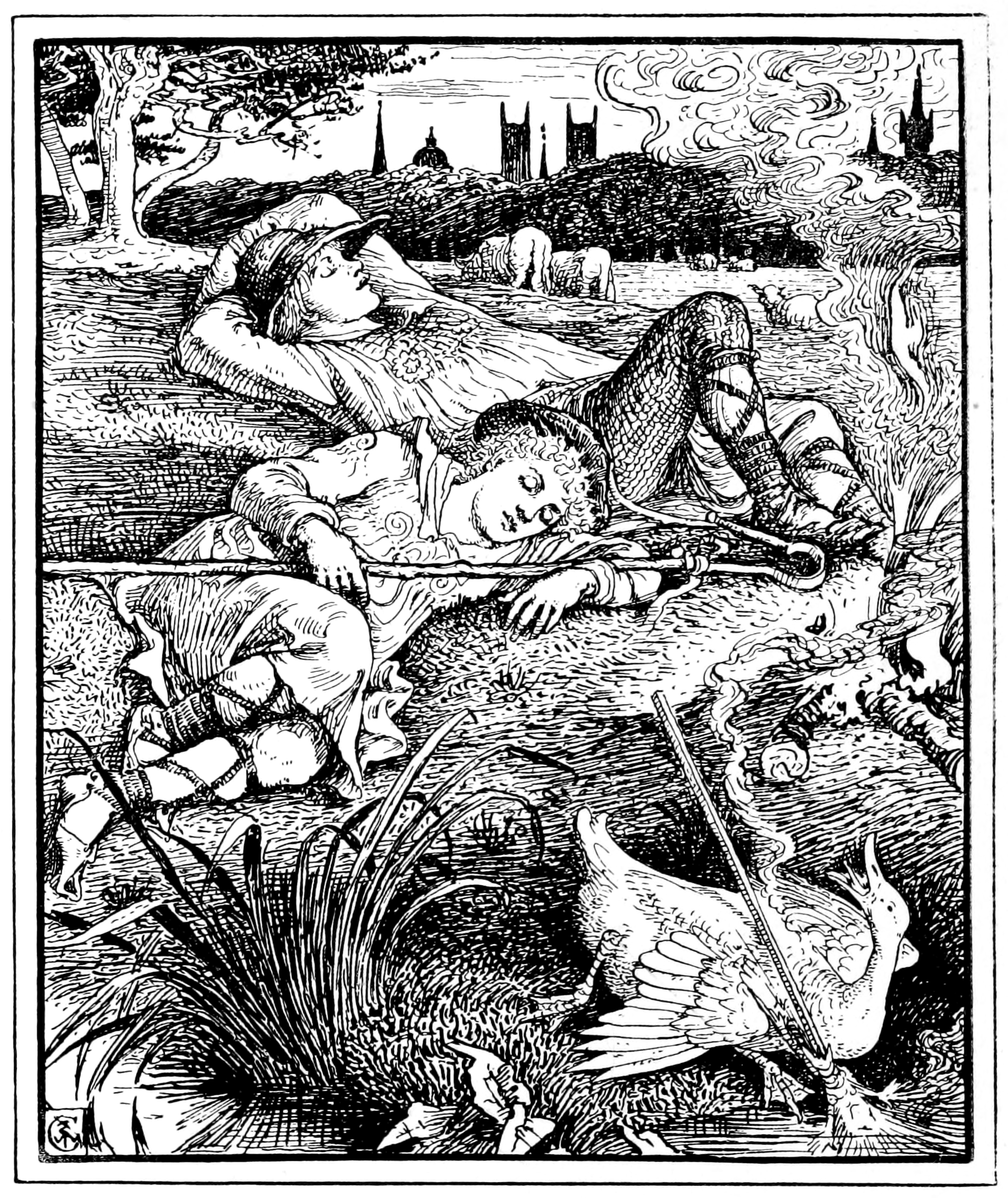
- Walter Crane's illustration in The Happy Prince and Other Tales (1888)

Folk tale
- Name: The Remarkable Rocket
- Origin Date: 1888
- Published in: The Happy Prince and Other Tales

"The Remarkable Rocket" is a short fairytale, first published in 1888 in The Happy Prince and Other Tales, a collection of five fairytales written by Oscar Wilde.

"The Remarkable Rocket" is a parody of aristocratic vanity and masculine conceit. Although the story is written in simple language, the humour is directed at adults.

== Plot summary ==
A wealthy prince and a beautiful Russian princess, who are meant to marry, meet for the first time and fall madly in love with each other. Their wedding is to be a huge celebration for the entire realm, with all sorts of entertainment, including fireworks as a grand finale at midnight. The princess has never seen fireworks, so the king and the prince are eager for her to see them. These fireworks have the ability to speak and they talk amongst themselves before they are launched by the pyrotechnic.

Among the fireworks is a Rocket, who is arrogant, pompous and condescending. When he brags about his heritage, the others call him insensitive, and he takes great offence. To prove his sensitivity, the Remarkable Rocket bursts into tears before he is lit, and is too damp to catch fire. The servants dispose of him over the castle walls and he lands in a ditch.

The Rocket does not realise that he has been discarded and believes that he is being given time to recover his strength before being lit. He still believes that he is superior, and speaks insultingly to a frog, a dragonfly, and a duck, boasting that he will be magnificent when he is finally let off.

Two boys who are collecting wood to make a fire mistake him for a piece of kindling. Much to his indignation, they place him on their fire. Eventually he dries off enough to ignite and explode, but it is midday and no one sees the display except a startled goose. Even as he fizzles away, the Remarkable Rocket still believes that he has created a great sensation.

== Epigrams ==
Wilde was known for his use of epigrams in his writing. These are brief, interesting, memorable, and sometimes surprising or satirical statements. "The Remarkable Rocket" contains many of these, including:

"I like to do all of the talking myself. It saves time and prevents arguments."

"How fortunate it is for the King’s son," he remarked, "that he is to be married on the very day on which I am to be let off. Really, if it had been arranged beforehand, it could not have turned out better for him; but, Princes are always lucky."

"But the Roman Candle and the Bengal Light were quite indignant, and kept saying, 'Humbug! humbug!' at the top of their voices. They were extremely practical, and whenever they objected to anything they called it humbug."

"I like hearing myself talk. It is one of my greatest pleasures. I often have long conversations all by myself, and I am so clever that sometimes I don't understand a single word of what I am saying."
