= A House of Pomegranates =

Collection of fairy tales by Oscar Wilde

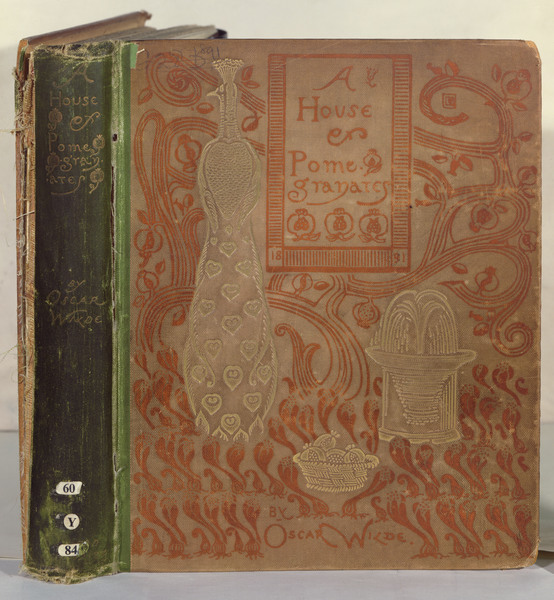
- Original book cover of A House of Pomegranates, published in 1891
- Author: Oscar Wilde
- Publication date: January 1, 1891

Illustration of the witch from "The Fisherman and His Soul"

A House of Pomegranates is a collection of fairy tales written by Oscar Wilde, published in 1891. It is Wilde's second fairy tale collection, following The Happy Prince and Other Tales (1888). He said of the book that it was "intended neither for the British child nor the British public".

== Influences ==
Wilde's fairy tales were heavily influenced by the Brothers Grimm as well as Hans Christian Andersen. He also derived his dialectic technique of paradox and the notion of pederastic code from Plato. Furthermore, Wilde was heavily influenced by Walter Pater; he called Pater's The Renaissance: Studies in the History of Art and Poetry his "golden book", declaring he never went anywhere without it. He also called it "...the very flower of decadence; the last trumpet should have sounded the moment it was written". The aesthetics suggested by Pater guided Wilde in creating the worlds within A House of Pomegranates, each respective story reflecting decadent subjects and delving into their own senses of sensuality.

Despite this collection being similarly defined by decadent themes which "...encode and express a pederastic ethos through the particular focus on sensual experience and moral enlightenment", he also preaches an orthodox Christian morality and pagan joys. While facing critique that his fairytales were not suited for children, he wrote that he "had about as much intention of pleasing the British child as [he] had of pleasing the British public". Regardless, Wilde pulls readers away from rigid innocence and introduces new pleasures within his fairytales, offering an idealistic kind of sensuality.

== Contents ==
=== The Young King ===
Nearing death, an old king reveals his secret grandson, who lived with a poor family, is next in line for the throne. The old king's servants bring the son back. The son is thrilled with the change of lifestyle and admires all the riches he is surrounded by. He sends orders for more art, jewels and riches to be brought to him. Falling asleep, he dreams about the royal workshop, filled with malnourished workers. The young king asks one of the workers who their master is and the worker explains that the master is a man just like them, save for the fact that he lives a rich person's life while the workers toil and suffer. The young king realizes they are working to make him a robe. He then has another dream, where a young worker dies collecting pearls for the king's scepter. There is a third dream where Death and Avarice fight over the workers mining for the young king's crown. Waking up, the young king refuses to wear the robe, crown and scepter. At first the people antagonize him for this, but soon they realize the king's justness.

=== The Birthday of the Infanta ===
A princess in Spain is celebrating her twelfth birthday; performers are invited to entertain the princess and she takes a liking to the dancing dwarf. Yet, nobody in the court wants to be near the dwarf because of his physical appearance. Later on, the princess gives the dwarf a white rose, with him thinking that this means she's in love with him. They start to dance in the forest and the dwarf starts to dream of running away with the princess. However, he realizes why people shun him, as he sees his own reflection in a mirror and initially mistakes himself for a monster. The dwarf is miserable, having realized that the princess was only interested in mocking him. Shortly afterwards the princess walks in, demanding the dwarf to dance for her and he doesn't respond, as he is dead from a broken heart. The princess then tells herself she will not play with people who have hearts from now on.

=== The Fisherman and His Soul ===
A fisherman catches a mermaid; he thinks she's very beautiful and tries to keep her, but she pleads that he lets her go. He agrees on the condition that whenever he calls she comes and sings so he can catch fish. He falls in love with the mermaid and asks her to marry him; she explains she can't unless he has no soul. The fisherman sees a young witch who agrees to help him get rid of his soul if he dances with her at the Witches' Sabbath. She tells the fisherman he can be free of his soul if he cuts his shadow away from his feet. Before they are separated, his soul asks the fisherman not to let him out without a heart, but the fisherman refuses. The soul promises to return every year and call for the fisherman. Over the next two years the soul brings tales of wisdom and riches, but the fisherman rejects all of these over love. The third year, the soul invites the fisherman to join him on his journey, but he tricks the fisherman into killing a merchant because the soul does not have a heart. He tries to return to the mermaid but she does not come back. Two years later the mermaid's dead body washes ashore and the fisherman's heart breaks, allowing him and the soul to completely merge as one. The fisherman drowns himself and dies.

=== The Star-Child ===
A poor lumberjack finds a baby and decides to take him home, raising the child as his own. The baby grows up to be a handsome young boy, but he is cruel and goes around torturing animals and people. One day he throws a stone at an old woman, with the lumberjack demanding him to stop. The old woman gasps, as she recognizes the little boy as the child she had birthed ten years ago. The boy is disgusted and refuses to believe that she is his mother. He runs off to play with his friends, but they refuse to play with him because he looks like a toad. He runs to the river and sees he has the face and scales of a toad. Realizing that this transformation is because he rejected his mother, he sets off to find her and gain her forgiveness. He wanders the world for three years; nobody will help him, and he is sold to an old man as a slave. The old man asks the boy to find three bars of white, yellow, and red gold. Yet, whenever he finds a bar of gold, he gives it to a beggar asking for money, choosing to suffer the old man's cruel punishments. By the third time he helps the beggar, he is rewarded and honored by the entire city. He learns that his parents are in fact the king and queen, and eventually takes over the throne himself.

== Themes ==
=== Aestheticism ===
Wilde's detailed descriptions of beauty, separated from their traditional notions of virtues and "social mores" found in other fairy tales, become its perfection and end. "The Young King" features a main character who seeks beautiful things, even if it as the expense of others. In "The Birthday of the Infanta", the ideals of beauty are ultimately shallow as the titular princess who is deemed the ideal beauty, is cruel. The third story, "The Fisherman and His Soul", contains a quest that signifies the perilous nature of aesthetic obsession. The final story of the collection, "The Star-Child", features detailed descriptions of beauty, and like the Infanta, the child is arrogant and proud despite his appearance—his looks are useless as they don't determine his character.

=== Judeo-Christian Imagery ===
The collection's title evokes Judeo-Christian imagery with the understanding of pomegranates associated with fertility, suffering, and the resurrection. Pomegranates also symbolize beauty in Judean understandings. Both heritages also view pomegranates as an "aesthetic object". The pomegranate is also placed as a symbol of decadence, luxury and sumptuousness, fitting for the great detail and descriptions found in the stories regarding luxury and aesthetics.

In "The Young King" the titular character has a "Christlike appeal" and undergoes a spiritual transformation where he "receives and projects the light of God" into the room and in front of his subjects. Raised by and as a peasant, the young king becomes a Christian, crowned by God, and enters "a new aesthetic realm...[where] Christianity...is the highest form of aestheticism". "The Fisherman and His Soul" portrays a similar exploration of Christian imagery while touching on themes of temptation, love, suffering and sin while being "told in a manner reminiscent of the Holy Bible". The soul who drinks the "sweet juices" (1) of the pomegranates further descends into sin and temptation. At the end of the tale, the fisherman "becomes a Christian", receiving God's mercy and love at his grave, "prompting a change in the wrathful priest, who speaks of all-embracing love and blesses all of God's creatures".

=== Greek mythology ===
In Greek myth, pomegranates allude to blood and violence and life coming from death as well. In Ancient Greece, pomegranates are most prominent in the myth of Persephone, who consumed pomegranate seeds which required her to spend some time in the underworld and on land during specific seasons of the year. This cycle is attributed to the temptation and consumption of pomegranates. A similar allegorical exploration of the use of pomegranates in the Greek myth is featured in "The Fisherman and His Soul". The repetition of pomegranate imagery in the story is used to reflect temptation, luxury and threat as the places the soul travels to: the Street of Pomegranates and the garden of pomegranates. The soul's drinking of the pomegranate juices parallels Persphone's consumption of the seeds and also "serves as a signal that the places through which the soul passes can be seen to constitute a moral underworld". The ending of the story can also refer to the cycle of life and death in the myth of Persephone—the barren graves and the Sea-folk who left.
