= Carol Day =

Carol
- A c. 1965 Carol Day daily comic strip panel by David Wright (strip #2795), © Patrick Wright. Carol and a beau are shown.
- Author(s): David Wright and Peter Meriton
- Current status/schedule: Discontinued
- Launch date: 10 September 1956
- End date: 25 May 1967
- Syndicate(s): The Daily Mail.
- Genre(s): Drama comics, Romance comics

Carol Day was a British soap opera comic strip, created by David Wright and Peter Meriton, and published from 10 September 1956 to 25 May 1967.

== History and concept ==
Carol Day was published in The Daily Mail and syndicated in around 70 newspapers around the world. It featured the every-day adventures of a young blonde model, Carol Day. She had a wealthy uncle in the Caribbean, Marcus, who serves as her guardian and help. David Wright drew the stories, while Peter Meriton provided the scripts.

== Cast ==
- Carol Day: A young female model.

=== Family members ===
- Marcus Axel: Carol's uncle and guardian. He collects African art.
- Richard Axel: Carol's uncle, who owns the Caribbean island Gabriela.
- Cousin Hugo: Carol's cousin who is the black sheep of the family. He is an associate of con-man Vernon Flowers and always begs for money when he is at Carol's place.

=== Friends ===
- Michael Fletcher: A photographer and first fiancé of Carol.
- Joe Wilson: Australian photographer and Carol's second fiancé.
- Charles Logan: A friend of Carol whom she fancies.
- Mark Lovell: A jazz musician. Brother of Nora Lovell.
- Nora Lovell: Carol's schoolmate and early roommate in London. Sister of Mark Lovell.
- Max Kessell: Mark Lovell's roommate and fellow musician.
- Adam Boone: A friend of Carol who is a reclusive sculptor.
- Clive Ellis: An artist and friend of Carol.
- Jack Slingsby: An artist and friend of Carol.
- Angela Logan: A friend of Carol who is a model.
- Baines: Butler of Marcus Axel. Carol often takes him in confidence.
- Humphrey Patcham
- Oswald Patcham: Son of Humphrey Patcham, who develops a crush on Carol.
- Vernon Flowers: A con-man and a criminal who is a bad influence on Carol's cousin Hugo.

=== Side characters ===
- Arnold Tracy: An older man who tries to make Carol love him.
- Reverend William Evans: A vicar in Marcus Axel's village.
- Commander Black: A retired commander and good friend of Uncle Marcus. He is the father of Edward Black.
- Edward Black: Son of Commander Black. He is a spoiled man.
- Captain Riker: Friend of the Patcham who keeps over Oswald.
- Paul Egan: Head of a fashion house and Carol's main employer.
- June Egan: Wife of Paul Egan.
- Jennifer Egan: Daughter of Paul Egan.
- Gillian Vane: Assistant of Paul Egan
- Henry Dietz: Owns a small Caribbean island.
- Ian Carr: Sent down from Oxford in disgrace, stays with his mother Anne.
- Peter Castle: Playwright and friend of Paul Egan.
- Tim Privett: Friend of Uncle Richard.
- Doctor Gomez: A black doctor who lives on the Caribbean island Gabriela.
- Sarah: Uncle Richard's black housekeeper.
- Joe Wilson
- Simon Ware: An assistant of Joe Wilson who suffers from mental problems. He develops an obsession with Carol.

== Story Lines ==
Carol Day stories from David Wright were published from 1956 to 1967, last strip was #3305. Kenneth Inns then took over from 1967 to 1971. See the following story timeline:

Episodes	Start date	End date	Notes	
1. Charles Logan	1 - 104	Monday, September 10, 1956	Thursday, January 10, 1957	There was no paper on Tuesday and Wednesday, December 25 and 26, 1956
2. Lance Hallam	105 - 188	Friday, January 11, 1957	Thursday, April 18, 1957	There was no paper on Friday, April 19, 1957 (Good Friday)
3. Paris Episode	189 - 276	Saturday, April 20, 1957	Wednesday, July 31, 1957	
4. Dangerous Currents	277 - 356	Thursday, August 1, 1957	Friday, November 1, 1957	
5. Problem Child	357 - 451	Saturday, November 2, 1957	Saturday, February 22, 1958	There was no paper on Wednesday and Thursday, December 25 and 26, 1957
6. Seconds Out!	452 - 508	Monday, February 24, 1958	Thursday, May 1, 1958	There was no paper on Friday, April 4, 1958 (Good Friday)
7. Brother Brushes	509 - 609	Friday, May 2, 1958	Wednesday, August 27, 1958	
8. Riverside Racket	610 - 698	Thursday, August 28, 1958	Tuesday, December 9, 1958	
9. Face Value	699 - 777	Wednesday, December 10, 1958	Friday, March 13, 1959	There was no paper on Thursday and Friday, December 25 and 26, 1958
10. Ebb-Tide	778 - 865	Saturday, March 14, 1959	Thursday, June 25, 1959	There was no paper on Friday, March 27, 1959 (Good Friday)
11. Cross-Currents	866 - 952	Friday, June 26, 1959	Monday, October 5, 1959	
12. Where There's A Will	953 - 1045	Tuesday, October 6, 1959	Saturday, January 23, 1960	There was no paper on Friday and Saturday, December 25 and 26, 1959
13. Last Of The Line	1046 - 1149	Monday, January 25, 1960	Wednesday, May 25, 1960	There was no paper on Friday, April 15, 1960 (Good Friday)
14. Money Matters	1150 - 1246	Thursday, May 26, 1960	Thursday, September 15, 1960	
15. Off Stage	1247 - 1332	Friday, September 16, 1960	Saturday, December 24, 1960	
16. Emergency!	1333 - 1433	Wednesday, December 28, 1960	Tuesday, April 25, 1961	There was no paper on Monday and Tuesday, December 26 and 27, 1960, and there was no paper on Friday, March 31, 1961 (Good Friday)
17. Shadow of Suspicion	1434 - 1521	Wednesday, April 26, 1961	Saturday, August 5, 1961	
18. Caribbean Captives	1522 - 1620	Monday, August 7, 1961	Wednesday, November 29, 1961	
19. The Changeling	1621 - 1713	Thursday, November 30, 1961	Tuesday, March 20, 1962	There was no paper on Monday and Tuesday, December 25 and 26, 1961
20. The Prophet	1714 - 1809	Wednesday, March 21, 1962	Wednesday, July 11, 1962	There was no paper on Friday, April 20, 1962 (Good Friday); #1807, Monday, July 9, 1962 - last printed story title in the Daily Mail
21. Edgar Tracy	1809 - 1881	Wednesday, July 11, 1962 (last panel)	Wednesday, October 3, 1962	
22. Friedrich Kahlenberg	1882 - 1969	Thursday, October 4, 1962	Wednesday, January 16, 1963	There was no paper on Tuesday and Wednesday, December 25 and 26, 1962
23. Simon Ware	1970 - 2075	Thursday, January 17, 1963	Tuesday, May 21, 1963	There was no paper on Friday, April 12, 1963 (Good Friday)
24. Jimmy Hayes	2075 - 2205	Tuesday, May 21, 1963 (last panel)	Saturday, October 19, 1963	
25. Cousin Hugo	2205 - 2315	Saturday, October 19, 1963 (last panel)	Thursday, February 27, 1964	There was no paper on Wednesday and Thursday, December 25 and 26, 1963
26. Gerald Wain	2315 - 2413	Thursday, February 27, 1964 (last panel)	Monday, June 22, 1964	There was no paper on Friday, March 27, 1964 (Good Friday)
27. Jack Slingsby	2414 - 2528	Tuesday, June 23, 1964	Tuesday, November 3, 1964	
28. Rev. William Evans	2529 - 2639	Wednesday, November 4, 1964	Monday, March 15, 1965	There was no paper on Friday and Saturday, December 25 and 26, 1964
29. Adam Boone	2640 - 2733	Tuesday, March 16, 1965	Saturday, July 3, 1965	There was no paper on Friday, April 16, 1965 (Good Friday)
30. Gordon Grimes	2733 - 2847	Saturday, July 3, 1965 (last panel)	Saturday, November 13, 1965	
31. Mr. Boker	2848 - 2966	Monday, November 15, 1965	Monday, April 4, 1966	There was no paper on Saturday and Monday, December 25 and 27, 1965
32. Mystery Man	2967 - 3042	Tuesday, April 5, 1966	Saturday, July 2, 1966	There was no paper on Friday, April 8, 1966 (Good Friday)
33. Max Kalman	3043 - 3147	Monday, July 4, 1966	Wednesday, November 2, 1966	
34. Uncle Richard	3148 - 3250	Thursday, November 3, 1966	Saturday, March 4, 1967	There was no paper on Monday and Tuesday, December 26 and 27, 1966, and there was no paper on Friday, March 24, 1967 (Good Friday). On Monday, March 6, 1967, the Mail reported: David Wright, the creator of Carol Day, has been ordered to rest by his doctor. He has been drawing this immensely popular strip for the Daily Mail for 10 1/2 years, and while he takes a well-earned respite we are re-publishing one of the earlier episodes, in the Carol Day saga, beginning today. At the end of the story, David Wright will be back with a new adventure. Shadow of Suspicion was the story they chose to reprint.
35. Spiros Londos	3251 - 3346	Monday, June 19, 1967	Saturday, October 7, 1967	Episode 3305, Monday, August 21 is David Wright's last Carol Day. As of episode 3306 the art was taken over by Kenneth Inns.
36. [JACK SLINGSBY 2]	3347 - 3454	Monday, October 9, 1967	Tuesday, February 13, 1968	There was no paper on Monday and Tuesday, December 25 and 26, 1967
37. [GORDON GRIMES 2]	3455 - 3544	Wednesday, February 14, 1968	Wednesday, May 29, 1968	There was no paper on Friday, April 12, 1968 (Good Friday). #3532, Wednesday, May 15, 1968, is a repeat of Tuesday, May 14, 1968
38. [DR. THOMSON]	3445 - 3642	Thursday, May 30, 1968	Thursday, October 31, 1968	Publication of Carol Day was suspended from Thursday, August 1, 1968, through Tuesday, September 10, 1968, due to a newspaper strike. Carol Day resumed publication on Wednesday, September 11, 1968, with strip 3599.
39. [PEREGRINE ARMSLEY]	3643 - 3742	Friday, November 1, 1968	Thursday, February 27, 1969	There was no paper on Wednesday and Thursday, December 25 and 26, 1968
40. [ADAM BOONE 2]	3742 - 3829	Thursday, February 27, 1969 (last panel)	Wednesday, June 11, 1969	There was no paper on Friday, April 4, 1969 (Good Friday). Friday, May 2, 1969, reprints strip #3795 from Thursday, May 1, 1969. No explanation given. #3796 is printed on Saturday, May 3, 1969, so no strip is missing. Weird end of story — the plot isn't wrapped up at all but #3830 on June 12 is an abrupt transition to a completely different plot
41. [SERGEI MARIKARDIS]	3830 - 3929	Thursday, June 12, 1969	Monday, October 6, 1969 (first panel)	
42. [DR. THOMSON 2]	3929 - 4018	Monday, October 6, 1969 (last two panels)	Tuesday, January 20, 1970 (first 2 panels)	There was no paper on Thursday and Friday, December 25 and 26, 1969
43. [MISS LOVEGROVE]	4018 - 4106	Tuesday, January 20, 1970 (last panel)	Monday, May 4, 1970	
44. [PEREGRINE ARMSLEY #2]	4107 - 4192 or 4193	Tuesday, May 5, 1970	Tuesday, August 18, 1970	
45. [SUSAN GORTON]	4194 - 4263	Wednesday, August 19, 1970	Saturday, November 7, 1970	
46. [JACK SLINGSBY #3]	4264 - 4357	Monday, November 9, 1970	Saturday, January 30, 1971 (first 2 panels)	
47. [IAN]	4357 - 4406	Saturday, January 30, 1971 (last panel)	Friday, April 30, 1971	
