= List of Hellboy comics =

Hellboy, B.P.R.D., Abe Sapien, Sir Edward Grey, Witchfinder, Lobster Johnson are comic book creations by Mike Mignola and are usually published by Dark Horse Comics. They have been featured in numerous miniseries, one-shots, backup features, crossovers, and guest appearances.

== Hellboy ==
=== Hellboy issues ===
Hellboy has an internal numbering on the inside cover of its issues. Below are the stories listed by their internal numbering for the comics. For better readability, Non-Hellboy-Universe backup stories are listed in a separate table.

Issue	Title	Published	Pages	Story	Art	Colors	Cover	Collections	Notes
#1	Seed of Destruction	PART 1: March, 1994 "#1 FOR $1": August 18, 2010; 25TH ANNIVERSARY: March 20, 2019	32 "#1 FOR $1": 28; 25TH ANNIVERSARY: 32	STORY: Mike Mignola; SCRIPT: John Byrne	Mike Mignola	Mark Chiarello	Mike Mignola; 25TH ANNIVERSARY: Mike Mignola	Hellboy Volume 1: Seed of Destruction TPB; Hellboy Library Edition Volume 1 HC; Hellboy Omnibus Volume 1: Seed of Destruction TPB	
#2	Seed of Destruction	PART 2: April, 1994	32	STORY: Mike Mignola; SCRIPT: John Byrne	Mike Mignola	Mark Chiarello	Mike Mignola; 25TH ANNIVERSARY: Mike Mignola	Hellboy Volume 1: Seed of Destruction TPB; Hellboy Library Edition Volume 1 HC; Hellboy Omnibus Volume 1: Seed of Destruction TPB	
#3	Seed of Destruction	PART 3: May, 1994	32	STORY: Mike Mignola; SCRIPT: John Byrne	Mike Mignola	Mark Chiarello	Mike Mignola; 25TH ANNIVERSARY: Mike Mignola	Hellboy Volume 1: Seed of Destruction TPB; Hellboy Library Edition Volume 1 HC; Hellboy Omnibus Volume 1: Seed of Destruction TPB	
#4	Seed of Destruction	PART 4: June, 1994	32	STORY: Mike Mignola; SCRIPT: John Byrne	Mike Mignola	Mark Chiarello	Mike Mignola; 25TH ANNIVERSARY: Mike Mignola	Hellboy Volume 1: Seed of Destruction TPB; Hellboy Library Edition Volume 1 HC; Hellboy Omnibus Volume 1: Seed of Destruction TPB	
#5	The Wolves of Saint August	November, 1995	48	Mike Mignola		James Sinclair	Mike Mignola	Hellboy Volume 3: The Chained Coffin and Others TPB; Hellboy Library Edition Volume 2 HC; Hellboy Omnibus Volume 1: Seed of Destruction TPB	32 of 40 pages originally published in b/w in Dark Horse Presents #88–#91; prestige format; ISBN 978-1-56971-094-4
#6	The Corpse and the Iron Shoes	January, 1996	32	Mike Mignola		THE CORPSE: Matt Hollingsworth; THE IRON SHOES: James Sinclair	Mike Mignola	Hellboy Volume 3: The Chained Coffin and Others TPB; Hellboy Library Edition Volume 2 HC; Hellboy: The Complete Short Stories Volume 1 TPB	16 of 25 pages of The Corpse originally published in Capital City's Advance Comics catalog #75–#82
#7	Wake the Devil	PART 1: June, 1996	32	Mike Mignola		James Sinclair, Dave Stewart	Mike Mignola	Hellboy Volume 2: Wake the Devil TPB; Hellboy Library Edition Volume 1 HC; Hellboy Omnibus Volume 1: Seed of Destruction TPB	
#8	Wake the Devil	PART 2: July, 1996	32	Mike Mignola		James Sinclair, Dave Stewart	Mike Mignola	Hellboy Volume 2: Wake the Devil TPB; Hellboy Library Edition Volume 1 HC; Hellboy Omnibus Volume 1: Seed of Destruction TPB	
#9	Wake the Devil	PART 3: August, 1996	32	Mike Mignola		James Sinclair, Dave Stewart	Mike Mignola	Hellboy Volume 2: Wake the Devil TPB; Hellboy Library Edition Volume 1 HC; Hellboy Omnibus Volume 1: Seed of Destruction TPB	
#10	Wake the Devil	PART 4: September, 1996	32	Mike Mignola		James Sinclair, Dave Stewart	Mike Mignola	Hellboy Volume 2: Wake the Devil TPB; Hellboy Library Edition Volume 1 HC; Hellboy Omnibus Volume 1: Seed of Destruction TPB	
#11	Wake the Devil	PART 5: October, 1996	32	Mike Mignola		James Sinclair, Dave Stewart	Mike Mignola	Hellboy Volume 2: Wake the Devil TPB; Hellboy Library Edition Volume 1 HC; Hellboy Omnibus Volume 1: Seed of Destruction TPB	
#12	Almost Colossus	PART 1: June 25, 1997	32	Mike Mignola		James Sinclair, Dave Stewart	Mike Mignola	Hellboy Volume 3: The Chained Coffin and Others TPB; Hellboy Library Edition Volume 2 HC; Hellboy Omnibus Volume 1: Seed of Destruction TPB	3 story pages added in collected version
#13	Almost Colossus	PART 2: July 30, 1997	32	Mike Mignola		James Sinclair, Dave Stewart	Mike Mignola	Hellboy Volume 3: The Chained Coffin and Others TPB; Hellboy Library Edition Volume 2 HC; Hellboy Omnibus Volume 1: Seed of Destruction TPB	3 story pages added in collected version
#14	Hellboy Christmas Special	December 3, 1997	52	A Christmas Underground			Gary Gianni	Hellboy Volume 3: The Chained Coffin and Others TPB; Hellboy Library Edition Volume 2 HC; Hellboy: The Complete Short Stories Volume 2 TPB	
#14	Hellboy Christmas Special	December 3, 1997	52	Mike Mignola		James Sinclair	Gary Gianni	Hellboy Volume 3: The Chained Coffin and Others TPB; Hellboy Library Edition Volume 2 HC; Hellboy: The Complete Short Stories Volume 2 TPB	
#15	Box Full of Evil	PART 1: August 11, 1999	32	Box Full of Evil #1			Mike Mignola	Hellboy Volume 4: The Right Hand of Doom TPB; Hellboy Library Edition Volume 2 HC; Hellboy Omnibus Volume 2: Strange Places TPB	
#15	Box Full of Evil	PART 1: August 11, 1999	32	Mike Mignola		Dave Stewart	Mike Mignola	Hellboy Volume 4: The Right Hand of Doom TPB; Hellboy Library Edition Volume 2 HC; Hellboy Omnibus Volume 2: Strange Places TPB	
#15	Box Full of Evil	PART 1: August 11, 1999	32	Lobster Johnson: The Killer in My Skull			Mike Mignola	B.P.R.D. Volume 1: Hollow Earth & Other Stories TPB; B.P.R.D.: Plague of Frogs Volume 1 HC/TPB; Lobster Johnson Omnibus Volume 2 HC	
#15	Box Full of Evil	PART 1: August 11, 1999	32	Mike Mignola	PENCILS: Matt Smith; INKS: Ryan Sook	Dave Stewart	Mike Mignola	B.P.R.D. Volume 1: Hollow Earth & Other Stories TPB; B.P.R.D.: Plague of Frogs Volume 1 HC/TPB; Lobster Johnson Omnibus Volume 2 HC	
#16	Box Full of Evil	PART 2: September 8, 1999	32	Box Full of Evil #2			Mike Mignola	Hellboy Volume 4: The Right Hand of Doom TPB; Hellboy Library Edition Volume 2 HC; Hellboy Omnibus Volume 2: Strange Places TPB	
#16	Box Full of Evil	PART 2: September 8, 1999	32	Mike Mignola		Dave Stewart	Mike Mignola	Hellboy Volume 4: The Right Hand of Doom TPB; Hellboy Library Edition Volume 2 HC; Hellboy Omnibus Volume 2: Strange Places TPB	
#16	Box Full of Evil	PART 2: September 8, 1999	32	Abe Sapien versus Science			Mike Mignola	B.P.R.D. Volume 1: Hollow Earth & Other Stories TPB; B.P.R.D.: Plague of Frogs Volume 1 HC/TPB; B.P.R.D. Omnibus Volume 1 TPB	
#16	Box Full of Evil	PART 2: September 8, 1999	32	Mike Mignola	PENCILS: Matt Smith; INKS: Mike Mignola	Dave Stewart	Mike Mignola	B.P.R.D. Volume 1: Hollow Earth & Other Stories TPB; B.P.R.D.: Plague of Frogs Volume 1 HC/TPB; B.P.R.D. Omnibus Volume 1 TPB	
#17	Conqueror Worm	PART 1: May 9, 2001	32	Mike Mignola		Dave Stewart	Mike Mignola	Hellboy Volume 5: Conqueror Worm TPB; Hellboy Library Edition Volume 3 HC; Hellboy Omnibus Volume 2: Strange Places TPB	
#18	Conqueror Worm	PART 2: June 13, 2001	32	Mike Mignola		Dave Stewart	Mike Mignola	Hellboy Volume 5: Conqueror Worm TPB; Hellboy Library Edition Volume 3 HC; Hellboy Omnibus Volume 2: Strange Places TPB	
#19	Conqueror Worm	PART 3: July 11, 2001	32	Mike Mignola		Dave Stewart	Mike Mignola	Hellboy Volume 5: Conqueror Worm TPB; Hellboy Library Edition Volume 3 HC; Hellboy Omnibus Volume 2: Strange Places TPB	
#20	Conqueror Worm	PART 4: August 8, 2001	32	Mike Mignola		Dave Stewart	Mike Mignola	Hellboy Volume 5: Conqueror Worm TPB; Hellboy Library Edition Volume 3 HC; Hellboy Omnibus Volume 2: Strange Places TPB	
#21	The Third Wish	PART 1: July 24, 2002	32	Mike Mignola		Dave Stewart	Mike Mignola	Hellboy Volume 6: Strange Places TPB; Hellboy Library Edition Volume 3 HC; Hellboy Omnibus Volume 2: Strange Places TPB	
#22	The Third Wish	PART 2: August 21, 2002	32	Mike Mignola		Dave Stewart	Mike Mignola	Hellboy Volume 6: Strange Places TPB; Hellboy Library Edition Volume 3 HC; Hellboy Omnibus Volume 2: Strange Places TPB	
—	The Corpse	March 24, 2004	40	Mike Mignola		Matt Hollingsworth	Mike Mignola	Hellboy Volume 3: The Chained Coffin and Others TPB; Hellboy Library Edition Volume 2 HC; Hellboy: The Complete Short Stories Volume 1 TPB	Reprint of The Corpse from Hellboy #6: The Corpse and the Iron Shoes with additional behind-the-scenes-art from the 2004 movie Hellboy
—	Hellboy Premiere Edition	December 2003; DAVIS VARIANT COVER: December 2003; WIZARD WORLD LOS ANGELES VARIANT COVER: December 2003	24	The Penanggalan			Mike Mignola; VARIANT: Guy Davis; WIZARD WORLD LOS ANGELES VARIANT: photo cover of Hellboy from the 2004 movie	Hellboy Volume 7 The Troll Witch and Others TPB; Hellboy Library Edition Volume 4 HC; Hellboy: The Complete Short Stories Volume 1 TPB	Free mail order issue offered in Wizard magazine #148
—	Hellboy Premiere Edition	December 2003; DAVIS VARIANT COVER: December 2003; WIZARD WORLD LOS ANGELES VARIANT COVER: December 2003	24	Mike Mignola	Mike Mignola	Dave Stewart	Mike Mignola; VARIANT: Guy Davis; WIZARD WORLD LOS ANGELES VARIANT: photo cover of Hellboy from the 2004 movie	Hellboy Volume 7 The Troll Witch and Others TPB; Hellboy Library Edition Volume 4 HC; Hellboy: The Complete Short Stories Volume 1 TPB	Free mail order issue offered in Wizard magazine #148
—	Hellboy Premiere Edition	December 2003; DAVIS VARIANT COVER: December 2003; WIZARD WORLD LOS ANGELES VARIANT COVER: December 2003	24	B.P.R.D.: Born Again			Mike Mignola; VARIANT: Guy Davis; WIZARD WORLD LOS ANGELES VARIANT: photo cover of Hellboy from the 2004 movie	B.P.R.D. Volume 4: The Dead TPB; B.P.R.D.: Plague of Frogs Volume 2: The Soul of Venice & Other Stories HC/TPB; B.P.R.D.: Omnibus Volume 2 TPB	Free mail order issue offered in Wizard magazine #148
—	Hellboy Premiere Edition	December 2003; DAVIS VARIANT COVER: December 2003; WIZARD WORLD LOS ANGELES VARIANT COVER: December 2003	24	John Arcudi	Guy Davis	Dave Stewart	Mike Mignola; VARIANT: Guy Davis; WIZARD WORLD LOS ANGELES VARIANT: photo cover of Hellboy from the 2004 movie	B.P.R.D. Volume 4: The Dead TPB; B.P.R.D.: Plague of Frogs Volume 2: The Soul of Venice & Other Stories HC/TPB; B.P.R.D.: Omnibus Volume 2 TPB	Free mail order issue offered in Wizard magazine #148
#23	The Island	PART 1: June 22, 2005	32	Mike Mignola		Dave Stewart	Mike Mignola	Hellboy Volume 6: Strange Places TPB; Hellboy Library Edition Volume 3 HC; Hellboy Omnibus Volume 2: Strange Places TPB	
#24	The Island	PART 2: July 27, 2005	32	Mike Mignola		Dave Stewart	Mike Mignola	Hellboy Volume 6: Strange Places TPB; Hellboy Library Edition Volume 3 HC; Hellboy Omnibus Volume 2: Strange Places TPB	
#25	Makoma, Or, a Tale Told by a Mummy in the New York City Explorer's Club on August 16, 1993	PART 1: February 1, 2006	32	Mike Mignola	PAGES 1–7: Mike Mignola; PAGES 8–24: Richard Corben	Dave Stewart	Mike Mignola	Hellboy Volume 7: The Troll Witch and Others TPB; Hellboy Library Edition Volume 4 HC; Hellboy: The Complete Short Stories Volume 2 TPB	
#26	Makoma, Or, a Tale Told by a Mummy in the New York City Explorer's Club on August 16, 1993	PART 2: March 1, 2006	32	Mike Mignola	PAGES 1–21: Richard Corben; PAGES 22–24: Mike Mignola	Dave Stewart	Richard Corben	Hellboy Volume 7: The Troll Witch and Others TPB; Hellboy Library Edition Volume 4 HC; Hellboy: The Complete Short Stories Volume 2 TPB	
#27	Darkness Calls	PART 1: May 2, 2007	32	Mike Mignola	Duncan Fegredo	Dave Stewart	Mike Mignola	Hellboy Volume 8: Darkness Calls TPB; Hellboy Library Edition Volume 5 HC; Hellboy Omnibus Volume 3: The Wild Hunt TPB	
#28	Darkness Calls	PART 2: May 30, 2007	32	Mike Mignola	Duncan Fegredo	Dave Stewart	Mike Mignola	Hellboy Volume 8: Darkness Calls TPB; Hellboy Library Edition Volume 5 HC; Hellboy Omnibus Volume 3: The Wild Hunt TPB	
#29	Darkness Calls	PART 3: June 27, 2007	32	Mike Mignola	Duncan Fegredo	Dave Stewart	Mike Mignola	Hellboy Volume 8: Darkness Calls TPB; Hellboy Library Edition Volume 5 HC; Hellboy Omnibus Volume 3: The Wild Hunt TPB	
#30	Darkness Calls	PART 4: July 25, 2007	32	Mike Mignola	Duncan Fegredo	Dave Stewart	Mike Mignola	Hellboy Volume 8: Darkness Calls TPB; Hellboy Library Edition Volume 5 HC; Hellboy Omnibus Volume 3: The Wild Hunt TPB	
#31	Darkness Calls	PART 5: August 29, 2007	32	Mike Mignola	Duncan Fegredo	Dave Stewart	Mike Mignola	Hellboy Volume 8: Darkness Calls TPB; Hellboy Library Edition Volume 5 HC; Hellboy Omnibus Volume 3: The Wild Hunt TPB	
#32	Darkness Calls	PART 6: November 7, 2007	32	Mike Mignola	Duncan Fegredo	Dave Stewart	Mike Mignola	Hellboy Volume 8: Darkness Calls TPB; Hellboy Library Edition Volume 5 HC; Hellboy Omnibus Volume 3: The Wild Hunt TPB	
—	They That Go Down to the Sea in Ships	August 2007	24	Mike Mignola, Joshua Dysart	Jason Shawn Alexander	Dave Stewart	Mike Mignola	Hellboy Volume 10: The Crooked Man and Others TPB; Hellboy Library Edition Volume 4 HC; Hellboy: The Complete Short Stories Volume 2 TPB	Free comic co-published by Konami to promote the video game Hellboy: The Science of Evil
—	Free Comic Book Day 2008: Hellboy	May 03, 2008	24	The Mole			Mike Mignola	Hellboy Volume 10: The Crooked Man and Others TPB; Hellboy Library Edition Volume 5 HC; Hellboy Omnibus Volume 3: The Wild Hunt TPB	
—	Free Comic Book Day 2008: Hellboy	May 03, 2008	24	Mike Mignola	Duncan Fegredo	Dave Stewart	Mike Mignola	Hellboy Volume 10: The Crooked Man and Others TPB; Hellboy Library Edition Volume 5 HC; Hellboy Omnibus Volume 3: The Wild Hunt TPB	
—	Free Comic Book Day 2008: Hellboy	May 03, 2008	24	B.P.R.D.: Bishop Olek's Devil			Mike Mignola	B.P.R.D. Volume 9: 1946 TPB; B.P.R.D.: 1946–1948 HC/TPB	
—	Free Comic Book Day 2008: Hellboy	May 03, 2008	24	Mike Mignola, Josh Dysart	Paul Azaceta	Nick Filardi	Mike Mignola	B.P.R.D. Volume 9: 1946 TPB; B.P.R.D.: 1946–1948 HC/TPB	
—	Free Comic Book Day 2008: Hellboy	May 03, 2008	24	B.P.R.D.: Out of Reach			Mike Mignola	B.P.R.D. Volume 10: The Warning TPB; B.P.R.D.: Plague of Frogs Volume 4 HC/TPB; B.P.R.D. Omnibus Volume 4 TPB	
—	Free Comic Book Day 2008: Hellboy	May 03, 2008	24	Mike Mignola, John Arcudi	Guy Davis	Dave Stewart	Mike Mignola	B.P.R.D. Volume 10: The Warning TPB; B.P.R.D.: Plague of Frogs Volume 4 HC/TPB; B.P.R.D. Omnibus Volume 4 TPB	
#33	The Crooked Man	PART 1: July 2, 2008	32	Mike Mignola	Richard Corben	Dave Stewart	Richard Corben	Hellboy Volume 10: The Crooked Man and Others TPB; Hellboy Library Edition Volume 4 HC; Hellboy: The Complete Short Stories Volume 1 TPB	
#34	The Crooked Man	PART 2: August 13, 2008	32	Mike Mignola	Richard Corben	Dave Stewart	Richard Corben	Hellboy Volume 10: The Crooked Man and Others TPB; Hellboy Library Edition Volume 4 HC; Hellboy: The Complete Short Stories Volume 1 TPB	
#35	The Crooked Man	PART 3: September 24, 2008	32	Mike Mignola	Richard Corben	Dave Stewart	Richard Corben	Hellboy Volume 10: The Crooked Man and Others TPB; Hellboy Library Edition Volume 4 HC; Hellboy: The Complete Short Stories Volume 1 TPB	
#36	In the Chapel of Moloch	October 29, 2008	32	Mike Mignola		Dave Stewart	Mike Mignola	Hellboy Volume 10: The Crooked Man and Others TPB; Hellboy Library Edition Volume 4 HC; Hellboy: The Complete Short Stories Volume 2 TPB	
#37	The Wild Hunt	PART 1: December 3, 2008	32	The Wild Hunt #1			Mike Mignola	Hellboy Volume 9: The Wild Hunt TPB; Hellboy Library Edition Volume 5 HC; Hellboy Omnibus Volume 3: The Wild Hunt TPB	
#37	The Wild Hunt	PART 1: December 3, 2008	32	Mike Mignola	Duncan Fegredo	Dave Stewart	Mike Mignola	Hellboy Volume 9: The Wild Hunt TPB; Hellboy Library Edition Volume 5 HC; Hellboy Omnibus Volume 3: The Wild Hunt TPB	
#38	The Wild Hunt	PART 2: January 7, 2009	32	The Wild Hunt #2			Mike Mignola	Hellboy Volume 9: The Wild Hunt TPB; Hellboy Library Edition Volume 5 HC; Hellboy Omnibus Volume 3: The Wild Hunt TPB	
#38	The Wild Hunt	PART 2: January 7, 2009	32	Mike Mignola	Duncan Fegredo	Dave Stewart	Mike Mignola	Hellboy Volume 9: The Wild Hunt TPB; Hellboy Library Edition Volume 5 HC; Hellboy Omnibus Volume 3: The Wild Hunt TPB	
#38	The Wild Hunt	PART 2: January 7, 2009	32	How Koshchei Became Deathless #1			Mike Mignola	Hellboy: Weird Tales HC/TPB	
#38	The Wild Hunt	PART 2: January 7, 2009	32	Mike Mignola	Guy Davis	Dave Stewart	Mike Mignola	Hellboy: Weird Tales HC/TPB	
#39	The Wild Hunt	PART 3: February 11, 2009	32	The Wild Hunt #3			Mike Mignola	Hellboy Volume 9: The Wild Hunt TPB; Hellboy Library Edition Volume 5 HC; Hellboy Omnibus Volume 3: The Wild Hunt TPB	
#39	The Wild Hunt	PART 3: February 11, 2009	32	Mike Mignola	Duncan Fegredo	Dave Stewart	Mike Mignola	Hellboy Volume 9: The Wild Hunt TPB; Hellboy Library Edition Volume 5 HC; Hellboy Omnibus Volume 3: The Wild Hunt TPB	
#39	The Wild Hunt	PART 3: February 11, 2009	32	How Koshchei Became Deathless #2			Mike Mignola	Hellboy: Weird Tales HC/TPB	
#39	The Wild Hunt	PART 3: February 11, 2009	32	Mike Mignola	Guy Davis	Dave Stewart	Mike Mignola	Hellboy: Weird Tales HC/TPB	
#40	The Wild Hunt	PART 4: March 4, 2009	32	The Wild Hunt #4			Mike Mignola	Hellboy Volume 9: The Wild Hunt TPB; Hellboy Library Edition Volume 5 HC; Hellboy Omnibus Volume 3: The Wild Hunt TPB	
#40	The Wild Hunt	PART 4: March 4, 2009	32	Mike Mignola	Duncan Fegredo	Dave Stewart	Mike Mignola	Hellboy Volume 9: The Wild Hunt TPB; Hellboy Library Edition Volume 5 HC; Hellboy Omnibus Volume 3: The Wild Hunt TPB	
#40	The Wild Hunt	PART 4: March 4, 2009	32	Baba Yaga's Feast			Mike Mignola	Hellboy: Weird Tales HC/TPB	
#40	The Wild Hunt	PART 4: March 4, 2009	32	Mike Mignola	Guy Davis	Dave Stewart	Mike Mignola	Hellboy: Weird Tales HC/TPB	
#41	The Wild Hunt	PART 5: August 12, 2009	32	The Wild Hunt #5			Mike Mignola	Hellboy Volume 9: The Wild Hunt TPB; Hellboy Library Edition Volume 5 HC; Hellboy Omnibus Volume 3: The Wild Hunt TPB	
#41	The Wild Hunt	PART 5: August 12, 2009	32	Mike Mignola	Duncan Fegredo	Dave Stewart	Mike Mignola	Hellboy Volume 9: The Wild Hunt TPB; Hellboy Library Edition Volume 5 HC; Hellboy Omnibus Volume 3: The Wild Hunt TPB	
#42	The Wild Hunt	PART 6: September 9, 2009	32	The Wild Hunt #6			Mike Mignola	Hellboy Volume 9: The Wild Hunt TPB; Hellboy Library Edition Volume 5 HC; Hellboy Omnibus Volume 3: The Wild Hunt TPB	
#42	The Wild Hunt	PART 6: September 9, 2009	32	Mike Mignola	Duncan Fegredo	Dave Stewart	Mike Mignola	Hellboy Volume 9: The Wild Hunt TPB; Hellboy Library Edition Volume 5 HC; Hellboy Omnibus Volume 3: The Wild Hunt TPB	
#43	The Wild Hunt	PART 7: October 14, 2009	32	The Wild Hunt #7			Mike Mignola	Hellboy Volume 9: The Wild Hunt TPB; Hellboy Library Edition Volume 5 HC; Hellboy Omnibus Volume 3: The Wild Hunt TPB	
#43	The Wild Hunt	PART 7: October 14, 2009	32	Mike Mignola	Duncan Fegredo	Dave Stewart	Mike Mignola	Hellboy Volume 9: The Wild Hunt TPB; Hellboy Library Edition Volume 5 HC; Hellboy Omnibus Volume 3: The Wild Hunt TPB	
#43	The Wild Hunt	PART 7: October 14, 2009	32	The Burial of Katharine Baker			Mike Mignola	Witchfinder Volume 1: In the Service of Angels TPB; Witchfinder Omnibus Volume 1 HC/TPB	
#43	The Wild Hunt	PART 7: October 14, 2009	32	Mike Mignola, Scott Allie	Patric Reynolds	Dave Stewart	Mike Mignola	Witchfinder Volume 1: In the Service of Angels TPB; Witchfinder Omnibus Volume 1 HC/TPB	
#44	The Wild Hunt	PART 8: November 11, 2009	32	The Wild Hunt #8			Mike Mignola	Hellboy Volume 9: The Wild Hunt TPB; Hellboy Library Edition Volume 5 HC; Hellboy Omnibus Volume 3: The Wild Hunt TPB	
#44	The Wild Hunt	PART 8: November 11, 2009	32	Mike Mignola	Duncan Fegredo	Dave Stewart	Mike Mignola	Hellboy Volume 9: The Wild Hunt TPB; Hellboy Library Edition Volume 5 HC; Hellboy Omnibus Volume 3: The Wild Hunt TPB	
#45	The Bride of Hell	December 23, 2009	32	Mike Mignola	Richard Corben	Dave Stewart	Mike Mignola	Hellboy Volume 11: The Bride of Hell and Others TPB; Hellboy Library Edition Volume 6 HC; Hellboy: The Complete Short Stories Volume 2 TPB	
#46	Hellboy in Mexico (Or, a Drunken Blur)	May 5, 2010; MIGNOLA VARIANT COVER: May 5, 2010	32	Mike Mignola	Richard Corben	Dave Stewart	Richard Corben; VARIANT: Mike Mignola	Hellboy Volume 11: The Bride of Hell and Others TPB; Hellboy Library Edition Volume 6 HC; Hellboy in Mexico TPB; Hellboy: The Complete Short Stories Volume 1 TPB	
#47	The Storm	PART 1: July 7, 2010; B.P.R.D. MEMBERS ONLY VARIANT COVER: July 7, 2010	32	Mike Mignola	Duncan Fegredo	Dave Stewart	Mike Mignola; B.P.R.D. MEMBERS ONLY VARIANT: Mike Mignola	Hellboy Volume 12: The Storm and the Fury TPB; Hellboy Library Edition Volume 6 HC; Hellboy Omnibus Volume 3: The Wild Hunt TPB	
#48	The Storm	PART 2: August 4, 2010	32	Mike Mignola	Duncan Fegredo	Dave Stewart	Mike Mignola	Hellboy Volume 12: The Storm and the Fury TPB; Hellboy Library Edition Volume 6 HC; Hellboy Omnibus Volume 3: The Wild Hunt TPB	
#49	The Storm	PART 3: September 1, 2010	32	Mike Mignola	Duncan Fegredo	Dave Stewart	Mike Mignola	Hellboy Volume 12: The Storm and the Fury TPB; Hellboy Library Edition Volume 6 HC; Hellboy Omnibus Volume 3: The Wild Hunt TPB	
#50	Double Feature of Evil	November 17, 2010; CORBEN VARIANT COVER: November 17, 2010	32	Mike Mignola	Richard Corben	Dave Stewart	Mike Mignola; VARIANT: Richard Corben	Hellboy Volume 11: The Bride of Hell and Others TPB; Hellboy Library Edition Volume 6 HC; Hellboy: The Complete Short Stories Volume 1 TPB	
#51	The Sleeping and the Dead	PART 1: December 29, 2010; HAMPTON VARIANT COVER: December 29, 2010	32	Mike Mignola	Scott Hampton	Dave Stewart	Mike Mignola; VARIANT: Scott Hampton	Hellboy Volume 11: The Bride of Hell and Others TPB; Hellboy Library Edition Volume 6 HC; Hellboy: The Complete Short Stories Volume 2 TPB	
#52	The Sleeping and the Dead	PART 2: February 2, 2011	32	Mike Mignola	Scott Hampton	Dave Stewart	Mike Mignola	Hellboy Volume 11: The Bride of Hell and Others TPB; Hellboy Library Edition Volume 6 HC; Hellboy: The Complete Short Stories Volume 2 TPB	
#53	Buster Oakley Gets His Wish	April 13, 2011; MIGNOLA VARIANT COVER: April 13, 2011	32	Mike Mignola	Kevin Nowlan	Kevin Nowlan	Kevin Nowlan; VARIANT: Mike Mignola	Hellboy Volume 11: The Bride of Hell and Others TPB; Hellboy Library Edition Volume 6 HC; Hellboy: The Complete Short Stories Volume 2 TPB	
#54	Being Human	May 11, 2011	32	Mike Mignola	Richard Corben	Dave Stewart	Richard Corben	B.P.R.D.: Being Human TPB; Hellboy Omnibus Volume 2: Strange Places HC	
#55	The Fury	PART 1: June 1, 2011; FRANCAVILLA VARIANT COVER: June 1, 2011	32	Mike Mignola	Duncan Fegredo	Dave Stewart	Mike Mignola; VARIANT: Francesco Francavilla	Hellboy Volume 12: The Storm and the Fury TPB; Hellboy Library Edition Volume 6 HC; Hellboy Omnibus Volume 3: The Wild Hunt TPB	
#56	The Fury	PART 2: July 13, 2011	32	Mike Mignola	Duncan Fegredo	Dave Stewart	Mike Mignola	Hellboy Volume 12: The Storm and the Fury TPB; Hellboy Library Edition Volume 6 HC; Hellboy Omnibus Volume 3: The Wild Hunt TPB	
#57	The Fury	PART 3: August 10, 2011; MIGNOLA VARIANT COVER: August 10, 2011	32	Mike Mignola	Duncan Fegredo	Dave Stewart	Mike Mignola; VARIANT: Mike Mignola	Hellboy Volume 12: The Storm and the Fury TPB; Hellboy Library Edition Volume 6 HC; Hellboy Omnibus Volume 3: The Wild Hunt TPB	
—	HELLBOY IN HELL #1; The Descent	December 5, 2012; MIGNOLA VARIANT COVER: December 5, 2012; SECOND PRINTING: January 30, 2013	32	Mike Mignola	Mike Mignola	Dave Stewart	Mike Mignola; VARIANT: Mike Mignola; SECOND PRINTING: Mike Mignola	Hellboy in Hell Volume 1: The Descent TPB; Hellboy in Hell Library Edition HC; Hellboy Omnibus Volume 4: Hellboy in Hell TPB	Second printing has a new cover
—	HELLBOY IN HELL #2; Pandemonium	January 2, 2013; SECOND PRINTING: February 6, 2013	32	Mike Mignola	Mike Mignola	Dave Stewart	Mike Mignola	Hellboy in Hell Volume 1: The Descent TPB; Hellboy in Hell Library Edition HC; Hellboy Omnibus Volume 4: Hellboy in Hell TPB	
—	HELLBOY IN HELL #3; Family Ties	February 6, 2013	32	Mike Mignola	Mike Mignola	Dave Stewart	Mike Mignola	Hellboy in Hell Volume 1: The Descent TPB; Hellboy in Hell Library Edition HC; Hellboy Omnibus Volume 4: Hellboy in Hell TPB	
—	HELLBOY IN HELL #4; Death Riding an Elephant	March 6, 2013	32	Mike Mignola	Mike Mignola	Dave Stewart	Mike Mignola	Hellboy in Hell Volume 1: The Descent TPB; Hellboy in Hell Library Edition HC; Hellboy Omnibus Volume 4: Hellboy in Hell TPB	
—	HELLBOY IN HELL #5; The Three Gold Whips	December 4, 2013; COMICSPRO VARIANT: Mike Mignola	32	Mike Mignola	Mike Mignola	Dave Stewart	Mike Mignola; COMICSPRO EXCLUSIVE VARIANT: Mike Mignola	Hellboy in Hell Volume 1: The Descent TPB; Hellboy in Hell Library Edition HC; Hellboy Omnibus Volume 4: Hellboy in Hell TPB	
—	Hellboy 20th Anniversary Sampler	March 19, 2014	32	The Coffin Man			Mike Mignola	Hellboy in Mexico TPB; Hellboy: The Complete Short Stories Volume 1 TPB	
—	Hellboy 20th Anniversary Sampler	March 19, 2014	32	Mike Mignola	Fábio Moon	Dave Stewart	Mike Mignola	Hellboy in Mexico TPB; Hellboy: The Complete Short Stories Volume 1 TPB	
—	Hellboy 20th Anniversary Sampler	March 19, 2014	32	B.P.R.D. Color Comics Fun!			Mike Mignola	—	Parodies of newspaper comic strips, out of continuity
—	Hellboy 20th Anniversary Sampler	March 19, 2014	32	Robert Sikoryak			Mike Mignola	—	Parodies of newspaper comic strips, out of continuity
—	Hellboy 20th Anniversary Sampler	March 19, 2014	32	The Ghoul			Mike Mignola	—	Previously published in The Dark Horse Book of the Dead
—	Hellboy 20th Anniversary Sampler	March 19, 2014	32	Mike Mignola		Dave Stewart	Mike Mignola	—	Previously published in The Dark Horse Book of the Dead
—	Hellboy 20th Anniversary Sampler	March 19, 2014	32	B.P.R.D.: Another Day at the Office			Mike Mignola	—	Previously published in B.P.R.D. Volume 2: The Soul of Venice & Other Stories TPB
—	Hellboy 20th Anniversary Sampler	March 19, 2014	32	Mike Mignola	Cameron Stewart	Michelle Madsen	Mike Mignola	—	Previously published in B.P.R.D. Volume 2: The Soul of Venice & Other Stories TPB
—	HELLBOY IN HELL #6; The Death Card	May 14, 2014	32	Mike Mignola	Mike Mignola	Dave Stewart	Mike Mignola	Hellboy in Hell Volume 2: The Death Card TPB; Hellboy in Hell Library Edition HC; Hellboy Omnibus Volume 4: Hellboy in Hell TPB	
—	HELLBOY IN HELL #7–#8; The Hounds of Pluto	PART 1: August 26, 2015	32	Mike Mignola	Mike Mignola	Dave Stewart	Mike Mignola	Hellboy in Hell Volume 2: The Death Card TPB; Hellboy in Hell Library Edition HC; Hellboy Omnibus Volume 4: Hellboy in Hell TPB	
—	HELLBOY IN HELL #7–#8; The Hounds of Pluto	PART 2: September 23, 2015	32	Mike Mignola	Mike Mignola	Dave Stewart	Mike Mignola	Hellboy in Hell Volume 2: The Death Card TPB; Hellboy in Hell Library Edition HC; Hellboy Omnibus Volume 4: Hellboy in Hell TPB	
—	Hellboy Winter Special	January 27, 2016; 30TH ANNIVERSARY VARIANT COVER: January 27, 2016; FRIED PIE VARIANT COVER: January 27, 2016; COMIC BLOCK VARIANT COVER: January 27, 2016	36	Broken Vessels		Dave Stewart	Tim Sale; 30TH ANNIVERSARY VARIANT: Mike Mignola; FRIED PIE EXCLUSIVE VARIANT: Michael Avon Oeming; COMIC BLOCK EXCLUSIVE VARIANT: Ben Stenbeck	B.P.R.D.: The Devil You Know Volume 1: Messiah TPB; B.P.R.D.: The Devil You Know HC/TPB; B.P.R.D. Omnibus Volume 10 TPB	Fried Pie Exclusive Variant Cover has ISBN 978-1-4924-8190-4
—	Hellboy Winter Special	January 27, 2016; 30TH ANNIVERSARY VARIANT COVER: January 27, 2016; FRIED PIE VARIANT COVER: January 27, 2016; COMIC BLOCK VARIANT COVER: January 27, 2016	36	Mike Mignola, Scott Allie	Tim Sale	Dave Stewart	Tim Sale; 30TH ANNIVERSARY VARIANT: Mike Mignola; FRIED PIE EXCLUSIVE VARIANT: Michael Avon Oeming; COMIC BLOCK EXCLUSIVE VARIANT: Ben Stenbeck	B.P.R.D.: The Devil You Know Volume 1: Messiah TPB; B.P.R.D.: The Devil You Know HC/TPB; B.P.R.D. Omnibus Volume 10 TPB	Fried Pie Exclusive Variant Cover has ISBN 978-1-4924-8190-4
—	Hellboy Winter Special	January 27, 2016; 30TH ANNIVERSARY VARIANT COVER: January 27, 2016; FRIED PIE VARIANT COVER: January 27, 2016; COMIC BLOCK VARIANT COVER: January 27, 2016	36	Hellboy and the B.P.R.D.: Wandering Souls		Dave Stewart	Tim Sale; 30TH ANNIVERSARY VARIANT: Mike Mignola; FRIED PIE EXCLUSIVE VARIANT: Michael Avon Oeming; COMIC BLOCK EXCLUSIVE VARIANT: Ben Stenbeck	Hellboy and the B.P.R.D.: 1953 TPB; Hellboy and the B.P.R.D.: 1952–1954 HC/TPB	Fried Pie Exclusive Variant Cover has ISBN 978-1-4924-8190-4
—	Hellboy Winter Special	January 27, 2016; 30TH ANNIVERSARY VARIANT COVER: January 27, 2016; FRIED PIE VARIANT COVER: January 27, 2016; COMIC BLOCK VARIANT COVER: January 27, 2016	36	Mike Mignola, Chris Roberson	Michael Walsh	Dave Stewart	Tim Sale; 30TH ANNIVERSARY VARIANT: Mike Mignola; FRIED PIE EXCLUSIVE VARIANT: Michael Avon Oeming; COMIC BLOCK EXCLUSIVE VARIANT: Ben Stenbeck	Hellboy and the B.P.R.D.: 1953 TPB; Hellboy and the B.P.R.D.: 1952–1954 HC/TPB	Fried Pie Exclusive Variant Cover has ISBN 978-1-4924-8190-4
—	Hellboy Winter Special	January 27, 2016; 30TH ANNIVERSARY VARIANT COVER: January 27, 2016; FRIED PIE VARIANT COVER: January 27, 2016; COMIC BLOCK VARIANT COVER: January 27, 2016	36	Mood Swings		Dave Stewart	Tim Sale; 30TH ANNIVERSARY VARIANT: Mike Mignola; FRIED PIE EXCLUSIVE VARIANT: Michael Avon Oeming; COMIC BLOCK EXCLUSIVE VARIANT: Ben Stenbeck	—	Fried Pie Exclusive Variant Cover has ISBN 978-1-4924-8190-4
—	Hellboy Winter Special	January 27, 2016; 30TH ANNIVERSARY VARIANT COVER: January 27, 2016; FRIED PIE VARIANT COVER: January 27, 2016; COMIC BLOCK VARIANT COVER: January 27, 2016	36	Chelsea Cain	Michael Avon Oeming	Dave Stewart	Tim Sale; 30TH ANNIVERSARY VARIANT: Mike Mignola; FRIED PIE EXCLUSIVE VARIANT: Michael Avon Oeming; COMIC BLOCK EXCLUSIVE VARIANT: Ben Stenbeck	—	Fried Pie Exclusive Variant Cover has ISBN 978-1-4924-8190-4
—	Hellboy Winter Special	January 27, 2016; 30TH ANNIVERSARY VARIANT COVER: January 27, 2016; FRIED PIE VARIANT COVER: January 27, 2016; COMIC BLOCK VARIANT COVER: January 27, 2016	36	Kung Pao Lobster		Dave Stewart	Tim Sale; 30TH ANNIVERSARY VARIANT: Mike Mignola; FRIED PIE EXCLUSIVE VARIANT: Michael Avon Oeming; COMIC BLOCK EXCLUSIVE VARIANT: Ben Stenbeck	—	Humor comic, out of continuity
—	Hellboy Winter Special	January 27, 2016; 30TH ANNIVERSARY VARIANT COVER: January 27, 2016; FRIED PIE VARIANT COVER: January 27, 2016; COMIC BLOCK VARIANT COVER: January 27, 2016	36	Dean Rankine		Dave Stewart	Tim Sale; 30TH ANNIVERSARY VARIANT: Mike Mignola; FRIED PIE EXCLUSIVE VARIANT: Michael Avon Oeming; COMIC BLOCK EXCLUSIVE VARIANT: Ben Stenbeck	—	Humor comic, out of continuity
—	HELLBOY IN HELL #9; The Spanish Bride	May 4, 2016	32	Mike Mignola	Mike Mignola	Dave Stewart	Mike Mignola	Hellboy in Hell Volume 2: The Death Card TPB; Hellboy in Hell Library Edition HC; Hellboy Omnibus Volume 4: Hellboy in Hell TPB	
—	HELLBOY IN HELL #10; For Whom the Bell Tolls	June 1, 2016	32	Mike Mignola	Mike Mignola	Dave Stewart	Mike Mignola	Hellboy in Hell Volume 2: The Death Card TPB; Hellboy in Hell Library Edition HC; Hellboy Omnibus Volume 4: Hellboy in Hell TPB	
—	Hellboy Winter Special 2017	January 25, 2017; FRIED PIE VARIANT COVER: January 25, 2017	36	Sir Edward Grey: The Great Blizzard			Sebastián Fiumara; FRIED PIE EXCLUSIVE VARIANT: Geof Darrow	Sir Edward Grey, Witchfinder Omnibus Volume 2 HC/TPB	Fried Pie Exclusive Variant Cover has ISBN 978-1-5325-1177-6
—	Hellboy Winter Special 2017	January 25, 2017; FRIED PIE VARIANT COVER: January 25, 2017	36	Mike Mignola, Chris Roberson	Christopher Mitten	Dave Stewart	Sebastián Fiumara; FRIED PIE EXCLUSIVE VARIANT: Geof Darrow	Sir Edward Grey, Witchfinder Omnibus Volume 2 HC/TPB	Fried Pie Exclusive Variant Cover has ISBN 978-1-5325-1177-6
—	Hellboy Winter Special 2017	January 25, 2017; FRIED PIE VARIANT COVER: January 25, 2017	36	The Visitor: God Rest Ye Merry			Sebastián Fiumara; FRIED PIE EXCLUSIVE VARIANT: Geof Darrow	The Visitor: How & Why He Stayed TPB; Hellboy Universe: The Secret Histories HC	Fried Pie Exclusive Variant Cover has ISBN 978-1-5325-1177-6
—	Hellboy Winter Special 2017	January 25, 2017; FRIED PIE VARIANT COVER: January 25, 2017	36	Mike Mignola, Chris Roberson	Paul Grist	Bill Crabtree	Sebastián Fiumara; FRIED PIE EXCLUSIVE VARIANT: Geof Darrow	The Visitor: How & Why He Stayed TPB; Hellboy Universe: The Secret Histories HC	Fried Pie Exclusive Variant Cover has ISBN 978-1-5325-1177-6
—	Hellboy Winter Special 2017	January 25, 2017; FRIED PIE VARIANT COVER: January 25, 2017	36	The Last Witch of Fairfield			Sebastián Fiumara; FRIED PIE EXCLUSIVE VARIANT: Geof Darrow	—	Fried Pie Exclusive Variant Cover has ISBN 978-1-5325-1177-6
—	Hellboy Winter Special 2017	January 25, 2017; FRIED PIE VARIANT COVER: January 25, 2017	36	Mike Mignola, Scott Allie	Sebastián Fiumara	Dave Stewart	Sebastián Fiumara; FRIED PIE EXCLUSIVE VARIANT: Geof Darrow	—	Fried Pie Exclusive Variant Cover has ISBN 978-1-5325-1177-6
—	Krampusnacht	December 20, 2017; PENCIL VARIANT COVER: December 20, 2017; MIGNOLA VARIANT COVER: December 20, 2017	36	Mike Mignola	Adam Hughes	Dave Stewart	Adam Hughes; PENCIL VARIANT: Adam Hughes; VARIANT: Mike Mignola	Hellboy and the B.P.R.D.: The Beast of Vargu and Others TPB	
—	Hellboy Winter Special 2018	December 12, 2018; BÁ VARIANT COVER: December 12, 2018; MOON VARIANT COVER: December 12, 2018	32	Hellboy and the B.P.R.D.: Happy New Year, Ava Galluci			Mike Mignola; VARIANT: Gabriel Bá; VARIANT: Fábio Moon	Hellboy and the B.P.R.D.: 1957 TPB; Hellboy and the B.P.R.D.: 1955–1957 HC	Oversize issue
—	Hellboy Winter Special 2018	December 12, 2018; BÁ VARIANT COVER: December 12, 2018; MOON VARIANT COVER: December 12, 2018	32	Mike Mignola	Ben Stenbeck	Dave Stewart	Mike Mignola; VARIANT: Gabriel Bá; VARIANT: Fábio Moon	Hellboy and the B.P.R.D.: 1957 TPB; Hellboy and the B.P.R.D.: 1955–1957 HC	Oversize issue
—	Hellboy Winter Special 2018	December 12, 2018; BÁ VARIANT COVER: December 12, 2018; MOON VARIANT COVER: December 12, 2018	32	B.P.R.D.: Vampire: Lost Ones			Mike Mignola; VARIANT: Gabriel Bá; VARIANT: Fábio Moon	B.P.R.D.: Vampire TPB (Second Edition)	Oversize issue
—	Hellboy Winter Special 2018	December 12, 2018; BÁ VARIANT COVER: December 12, 2018; MOON VARIANT COVER: December 12, 2018	32	Fábio Moon, Gabriel Bá		Dave Stewart	Mike Mignola; VARIANT: Gabriel Bá; VARIANT: Fábio Moon	B.P.R.D.: Vampire TPB (Second Edition)	Oversize issue
—	Hellboy Winter Special 2018	December 12, 2018; BÁ VARIANT COVER: December 12, 2018; MOON VARIANT COVER: December 12, 2018	32	Lobster Johnson: The Empty Chair			Mike Mignola; VARIANT: Gabriel Bá; VARIANT: Fábio Moon	Lobster Johnson Omnibus Volume 1 HC	Oversize issue
—	Hellboy Winter Special 2018	December 12, 2018; BÁ VARIANT COVER: December 12, 2018; MOON VARIANT COVER: December 12, 2018	32	Tonci Zonjic			Mike Mignola; VARIANT: Gabriel Bá; VARIANT: Fábio Moon	Lobster Johnson Omnibus Volume 1 HC	Oversize issue
—	Hellboy vs. Lobster Johnson: The Ring of Death	May 29, 2019	32	The Ring of Death			Paolo Rivera	Hellboy and the B.P.R.D.: 1956 TPB; Hellboy and the B.P.R.D.: 1955–1957 HC	
—	Hellboy vs. Lobster Johnson: The Ring of Death	May 29, 2019	32	Mike Mignola, Chris Roberson	Mike Norton	Dave Stewart	Paolo Rivera	Hellboy and the B.P.R.D.: 1956 TPB; Hellboy and the B.P.R.D.: 1955–1957 HC	
—	Hellboy vs. Lobster Johnson: The Ring of Death	May 29, 2019	32	Down Mexico Way			Paolo Rivera	Hellboy and the B.P.R.D.: 1956 TPB; Hellboy and the B.P.R.D.: 1955–1957 HC	
—	Hellboy vs. Lobster Johnson: The Ring of Death	May 29, 2019	32	Mike Mignola, Chris Roberson	Paul Grist	Bill Crabtree	Paolo Rivera	Hellboy and the B.P.R.D.: 1956 TPB; Hellboy and the B.P.R.D.: 1955–1957 HC	
—	Hellboy Winter Special 2019	January 15, 2020	32	Hellboy and the B.P.R.D.: The Miser's Gift			Mike Mignola	Hellboy and the B.P.R.D.: The Secret of Chesbro House & Others TPB	
—	Hellboy Winter Special 2019	January 15, 2020	32	Mike Mignola	Márk László	Dave Stewart	Mike Mignola	Hellboy and the B.P.R.D.: The Secret of Chesbro House & Others TPB	
—	Hellboy Winter Special 2019	January 15, 2020	32	The Longest Night			Mike Mignola	The House of Lost Horizons: A Sarah Jewell Mystery HC	
—	Hellboy Winter Special 2019	January 15, 2020	32	Chris Roberson	Leila del Duca	Michelle Madsen	Mike Mignola	The House of Lost Horizons: A Sarah Jewell Mystery HC	
—	Hellboy Winter Special 2019	January 15, 2020	32	The Beast of Ingelheim			Mike Mignola	—	Teaser for the canceled miniseries The Last Knight of St. Hagan
—	Hellboy Winter Special 2019	January 15, 2020	32	Scott Allie	Andrea Mutti	Lee Loughridge	Mike Mignola	—	Teaser for the canceled miniseries The Last Knight of St. Hagan
—	The Silver Lantern Club	PART 1: October 27, 2021	32	Mike Mignola, Chris Roberson	Ben Stenbeck, Christopher Mitten	Michelle Madsen	Mike Mignola, Christopher Mitten	The Silver Lantern Club HC	
—	The Silver Lantern Club	PART 2: November 24, 2021	32	Mike Mignola, Chris Roberson	Ben Stenbeck, Christopher Mitten	Michelle Madsen	Mike Mignola, Christopher Mitten	The Silver Lantern Club HC	
—	The Silver Lantern Club	PART 3: December 29, 2021	32	Mike Mignola, Chris Roberson	Ben Stenbeck, Christopher Mitten	Michelle Madsen	Mike Mignola, Christopher Mitten	The Silver Lantern Club HC	
—	The Silver Lantern Club	PART 4: January 26, 2022	32	Mike Mignola, Chris Roberson	Ben Stenbeck, Christopher Mitten	Michelle Madsen	Mike Mignola, Christopher Mitten	The Silver Lantern Club HC	
—	The Silver Lantern Club	PART 5: March 30, 2022	32	Mike Mignola, Chris Roberson	Ben Stenbeck, Christopher Mitten	Michelle Madsen	Mike Mignola, Christopher Mitten	The Silver Lantern Club HC	
—	The Bones of Giants	PART 1: November 3, 2021	32	Mike Mignola, Christopher Golden	Matt Smith	Chris O'Halloran	Matt Smith	The Bones of Giants HC	
—	The Bones of Giants	PART 2: December 1, 2021	32	Mike Mignola, Christopher Golden	Matt Smith	Chris O'Halloran	Matt Smith	The Bones of Giants HC	
—	The Bones of Giants	PART 3: January 5, 2022	32	Mike Mignola, Christopher Golden	Matt Smith	Chris O'Halloran	Matt Smith	The Bones of Giants HC	
—	The Bones of Giants	PART 4: February 16, 2022	32	Mike Mignola, Christopher Golden	Matt Smith	Chris O'Halloran	Matt Smith	The Bones of Giants HC	
—	Hellboy in Love: Goblin Night	PART 1: October 19, 2022	32	Mike Mignola, Christopher Golden	Matt Smith	Chris O'Halloran	Matt Smith	Hellboy in Love HC	
—	Hellboy in Love: Goblin Night	PART 2: December 07, 2022	32	Mike Mignola, Christopher Golden	Matt Smith	Chris O'Halloran	Matt Smith	Hellboy in Love HC	
—	Hellboy in Love: Shadow Theater	PART 1: February 22, 2023	32	Mike Mignola, Christopher Golden	Matt Smith	Chris O'Halloran	Matt Smith	Hellboy in Love HC	
—	Hellboy in Love: Shadow Theater	PART 2: March 29, 2023	32	Mike Mignola, Christopher Golden	Matt Smith	Chris O'Halloran	Matt Smith	Hellboy in Love HC	
—	Hellboy in Love: The Key To It All	July 12, 2023	32	Mike Mignola, Christopher Golden	Matt Smith	Chris O'Halloran	Matt Smith	Hellboy in Love HC	
—	Giant Robot Hellboy	PART 1: October 25, 2023; MIGNOLA VARIANT COVER: October 25, 2023	32	Mike Mignola	Duncan Fegredo	Dave Stewart	Duncan Fegredo; VARIANT: Mike Mignola		
—	Giant Robot Hellboy	PART 2: November 22, 2023; DARROW VARIANT COVER: November 22, 2023	32	Mike Mignola	Duncan Fegredo	Dave Stewart	Duncan Fegredo; VARIANT: Geof Darrow		
—	Giant Robot Hellboy	PART 3: December 27, 2023; ADAMS VARIANT COVER: December 27, 2023	32	Mike Mignola	Duncan Fegredo	Dave Stewart	Duncan Fegredo; VARIANT: Art Adams		
—	Hellboy Winter Special: The Yule Cat	December 6, 2023; MIGNOLA VARIANT COVER: December 6, 2023	32	Matt Smith		Chris O'Halloran	Matt Smith; VARIANT: Mike Mignola		
—	Free Comic Book Day 2024: Hellboy	May 4, 2024	32	The Fortune Teller			Mike Mignola		
—	Free Comic Book Day 2024: Hellboy	May 4, 2024	32	Mike Mignola	Márk László	Dave Stewart	Mike Mignola		
—	Hellboy in Love: The Art of Fire	PART 1: August 6, 2025	32	Mike Mignola, Christopher Golden	Alex Nieto				
—	Hellboy in Love: The Art of Fire	PART 2: September 10, 2025	32	Mike Mignola, Christopher Golden	Alex Nieto				

For better readability, Non-Hellboy-Universe backup stories in Hellboy issues are listed in this table.

Issue	Title	Backup story title	Story	Art	Colors
#1	Seed of Destruction #1	Monkeyman and O'Brien: Who Are Monkeyman and O'Brien?	Art Adams		Matt Hollingsworth
#2	Seed of Destruction #2	Monkeyman and O'Brien: Who Are Monkeyman and O'Brien?	Art Adams		Matt Hollingsworth
#3	Seed of Destruction #3	Monkeyman and O'Brien: Who Are Monkeyman and O'Brien?	Art Adams		Matt Hollingsworth
#4	Seed of Destruction #4	Monkeyman and O'Brien: Who Are Monkeyman and O'Brien?	Art Adams		Matt Hollingsworth
#7	Wake the Devil #1	The MonsterMen: Silent as the Grave	Gary Gianni		James Sinclair, Dave Stewart
#8	Wake the Devil #2	The MonsterMen: Silent as the Grave	Gary Gianni		James Sinclair, Dave Stewart
#9	Wake the Devil #3	The MonsterMen: Silent as the Grave	Gary Gianni		James Sinclair, Dave Stewart
#10	Wake the Devil #4	The MonsterMen: Silent as the Grave	Gary Gianni		James Sinclair, Dave Stewart
#11	Wake the Devil #5	The MonsterMen: Silent as the Grave	Gary Gianni		James Sinclair, Dave Stewart
#12	Almost Colossus #1	The MonsterMen: Autopsy In B-Flat	Gary Gianni		James Sinclair, Dave Stewart
#13	Almost Colossus #2	The MonsterMen: Autopsy In B-Flat	Gary Gianni		James Sinclair, Dave Stewart
#14	Hellboy Christmas Special	Toybox: Ernie's Holiday Ditty	Steve Purcell		
#14	Hellboy Christmas Special	A Strange Story	Gary Gianni		
#14	Hellboy Christmas Special	Christmas	Geof Darrow		Dave Stewart
#14	Hellboy Christmas Special	Toybox	Steve Purcell		
#14	Hellboy Christmas Special	The MonsterMen: Corpus Monstrum in A Gift for the Wicked	Gary Gianni		b/w
#41	The Wild Hunt #5	The MonsterMen: O Sinner Beneath Us!	Gary Gianni		Alex Wald
#42	The Wild Hunt #6	The MonsterMen: O Sinner Beneath Us!	Gary Gianni		Alex Wald
—	Free Comic Book Day 2024: Hellboy	Stranger Things: Deliver Me From Evil	Derek Fridolfs	Jonathan Case	Jonathan Case

=== Hellboy stories in other publications ===
Canon stories originally published in other publications, including original stories in Hellboy Universe collections. If a story was re-printed in a regular issue later, only that issue is mentioned in the column Collections; for other collections, see the entry of the regular issue.

Story title	Publication	Issue	Published	Format	Pages	Pages (story)	Story	Art	Colors	Cover	ISBN	Collections	Notes
Mike Mignola's Hellboy	San Diego Comic Con Comics	#2	August 1993	Saddle stitched	32	4	Mike Mignola, John Byrne	Mike Mignola	b/w COLLECTIONS: Matt Hollingsworth; SDCC 2018 SOUVENIR BOOK: Dave Stewart	Don Martin	—	Hellboy Volume 1 – Seed of Destruction TPB; Hellboy Library Edition Volume 1 HC; Hellboy Omnibus Volume 1 – Seed of Destruction TPB; San Diego Comic-Con International 2018 Souvenir Book TPB	Promotional comic, first published Hellboy story; reprinted in Comic's Buyer's Guide #1069
Mike Mignola's Hellboy: World's Greatest Paranormal Investigator	Comics Buyer's Guide	#1070	May 1994	Insert	?	4	Mike Mignola, John Byrne	Mike Mignola	b/w COLLECTIONS: Matt Hollingsworth	PENCILS: Mike Leeke; INKS: Dick Giordano	—	Hellboy Volume 1 – Seed of Destruction TPB; Hellboy Library Edition Volume 1 HC; Hellboy Omnibus Volume 1 – Seed of Destruction TPB	Promotional comic
The Wolves of Saint August	Dark Horse Presents	#88	PART 1: August 1994	Saddle stitched	36	8	Mike Mignola		b/w COLLECTIONS: James Sinclair	Mike Mignola	—	Hellboy #5: The Wolves of Saint August	8 additional pages in Hellboy #5
The Wolves of Saint August	Dark Horse Presents	#89	PART 2: September 1994	Saddle stitched	36	8	Mike Mignola		b/w COLLECTIONS: James Sinclair	Mike Mignola	—	Hellboy #5: The Wolves of Saint August	8 additional pages in Hellboy #5
The Wolves of Saint August	Dark Horse Presents	#90	PART 3: October 1994	Saddle stitched	36	8	Mike Mignola		b/w COLLECTIONS: James Sinclair	Mike Mignola	—	Hellboy #5: The Wolves of Saint August	8 additional pages in Hellboy #5
The Wolves of Saint August	Dark Horse Presents	#91	PART 4: November 1994	Saddle stitched	36	8	Mike Mignola		b/w COLLECTIONS: James Sinclair	Mike Mignola	—	Hellboy #5: The Wolves of Saint August	8 additional pages in Hellboy #5
The Corpse	Capital City's Advance Comics catalog	#75	PART 1: March 1995	?	364	2	Mike Mignola		Matt Hollingsworth	?	—	Hellboy #6: The Corpse and the Iron Shoes	New 1-page prologue and 8 story pages (parts 9–12) added in collected version
The Corpse	Capital City's Advance Comics catalog	#76	PART 2: April 1995	?	360	2	Mike Mignola		Matt Hollingsworth	?	—	Hellboy #6: The Corpse and the Iron Shoes	New 1-page prologue and 8 story pages (parts 9–12) added in collected version
The Corpse	Capital City's Advance Comics catalog	#77	PART 3: May 1995	?	372	2	Mike Mignola		Matt Hollingsworth	?	—	Hellboy #6: The Corpse and the Iron Shoes	New 1-page prologue and 8 story pages (parts 9–12) added in collected version
The Corpse	Capital City's Advance Comics catalog	#78	PART 4: June 1995	?	404	2	Mike Mignola		Matt Hollingsworth	?	—	Hellboy #6: The Corpse and the Iron Shoes	New 1-page prologue and 8 story pages (parts 9–12) added in collected version
The Corpse	Capital City's Advance Comics catalog	#79	PART 5: July 1995	?	332	2	Mike Mignola		Matt Hollingsworth	?	—	Hellboy #6: The Corpse and the Iron Shoes	New 1-page prologue and 8 story pages (parts 9–12) added in collected version
The Corpse	Capital City's Advance Comics catalog	#80	PART 6: August 1995	?	396	2	Mike Mignola		Matt Hollingsworth	?	—	Hellboy #6: The Corpse and the Iron Shoes	New 1-page prologue and 8 story pages (parts 9–12) added in collected version
The Corpse	Capital City's Advance Comics catalog	#81	PART 7: September 1995	?	348	2	Mike Mignola		Matt Hollingsworth	?	—	Hellboy #6: The Corpse and the Iron Shoes	New 1-page prologue and 8 story pages (parts 9–12) added in collected version
The Corpse	Capital City's Advance Comics catalog	#82	PART 8: October 1995	?	348	2	Mike Mignola		Matt Hollingsworth	?	—	Hellboy #6: The Corpse and the Iron Shoes	New 1-page prologue and 8 story pages (parts 9–12) added in collected version
The Chained Coffin	Dark Horse Presents	#100-0	PREVIEW (PAGES 3–5): August 1995	Saddle stitched	20	3	Mike Mignola		b/w COLLECTIONS: James Sinclair	Mike Allred	—	Hellboy Volume 3 – The Chained Coffin and Others TPB; Hellboy Library Edition Volume 2 HC; Hellboy Omnibus Volume 1 – Seed of Destruction TPB; Hellboy Universe Essentials: Hellboy TPB	Included with Hero Illustrated #26
The Chained Coffin	Dark Horse Presents	#100-2	FULL STORY: August 2, 1995	Saddle stitched	36	10	Mike Mignola		b/w COLLECTIONS: James Sinclair	Bernie Wrightson	—	Hellboy Volume 3 – The Chained Coffin and Others TPB; Hellboy Library Edition Volume 2 HC; Hellboy Omnibus Volume 1 – Seed of Destruction TPB; Hellboy Universe Essentials: Hellboy TPB	Page 1 slightly changed in collected version
The Baba Yaga	Hellboy Volume 3: The Chained Coffin and Others TPB		August 5, 1998	TPB	176	8	Mike Mignola		Dave Stewart	Mike Mignola	978-1-56971-349-5	Hellboy Volume 3 – The Chained Coffin and Others TPB; Hellboy Library Edition Volume 2 HC; Hellboy Omnibus Volume 1: Seed of Destruction TPB	
The Right Hand of Doom	Dark Horse Presents	Annual 1998	August 26, 1998	Saddle stitched	64	10	Mike Mignola		b/w COLLECTIONS: Dave Stewart	Mike Mignola	—	Hellboy Volume 4 – The Right Hand of Doom TPB; Hellboy Library Edition Volume 2 HC; Hellboy Omnibus Volume 2 – Strange Places TPB	New 1-page epilogue added in collected version
Goodbye Mister Tod	Gary Gianni's The MonsterMen		August 4, 1999	Saddle stitched	32	8	Mike Mignola		Dave Stewart	Gary Gianni	—	Hellboy Volume 4 – The Right Hand of Doom TPB; Hellboy Library Edition Volume 2 HC; Hellboy: The Complete Short Stories Volume 2 TPB	
Pancakes	Dark Horse Presents	Annual 1999	August 11, 1999	Saddle stitched	64	2	Mike Mignola		b/w COLLECTIONS: Dave Stewart	Various	—	Hellboy Volume 4 – The Right Hand of Doom TPB; Hellboy Library Edition Volume 2 HC; Hellboy: The Complete Short Stories Volume 1 TPB	
The Vârcolac (original version)	Dark Horse Extra	#14	PART 1: August 1999	Newspaper format	4	0.5	Mike Mignola		Dave Stewart	—	—	The Art of Hellboy HC/TPB	Story was redrawn and expanded for collected version; original version is collected in The Art of Hellboy
The Vârcolac (original version)	Dark Horse Extra	#15	PART 2: September 1999	Newspaper format	4	0.5	Mike Mignola		Dave Stewart	—	—	The Art of Hellboy HC/TPB	Story was redrawn and expanded for collected version; original version is collected in The Art of Hellboy
The Vârcolac (original version)	Dark Horse Extra	#16	PART 3: October 1999	Newspaper format	4	0.5	Mike Mignola		Dave Stewart	—	—	The Art of Hellboy HC/TPB	Story was redrawn and expanded for collected version; original version is collected in The Art of Hellboy
The Vârcolac (original version)	Dark Horse Extra	#17	PART 4: November 1999	Newspaper format	4	0.5	Mike Mignola		Dave Stewart	—	—	The Art of Hellboy HC/TPB	Story was redrawn and expanded for collected version; original version is collected in The Art of Hellboy
The Vârcolac (original version)	Dark Horse Extra	#18	PART 5: December 1999	Newspaper format	4	0.5	Mike Mignola		Dave Stewart	—	—	The Art of Hellboy HC/TPB	Story was redrawn and expanded for collected version; original version is collected in The Art of Hellboy
The Vârcolac (original version)	Dark Horse Extra	#19	PART 6: January 2000	Newspaper format	4	0.5	Mike Mignola		Dave Stewart	—	—	The Art of Hellboy HC/TPB	Story was redrawn and expanded for collected version; original version is collected in The Art of Hellboy
The Nature of the Beast	Dark Horse Presents	#151	February 16, 2000	Saddle stitched	32	8	Mike Mignola		b/w COLLECTIONS: Dave Stewart	Mike Mignola	—	Hellboy Volume 4 – The Right Hand of Doom TPB; Hellboy Library Edition Volume 2 HC; Hellboy: The Complete Short Stories Volume 2 TPB; Hellboy Universe Essentials: Hellboy TPB	
King Vold	Hellboy Volume 4: The Right Hand of Doom TPB		April 26, 2000	TPB	144	14	Mike Mignola		Dave Stewart	Mike Mignola	978-1-56971-489-8	Hellboy Volume 4 – The Right Hand of Doom TPB; Hellboy Library Edition Volume 2 HC; Hellboy Omnibus Volume 2: Strange Places TPB	
The Vârcolac (expanded version)	Hellboy Volume 4: The Right Hand of Doom TPB		April 26, 2000	TPB	144	12	Mike Mignola		Dave Stewart	Mike Mignola	978-1-56971-489-8	Hellboy Volume 4 – The Right Hand of Doom TPB; Hellboy Library Edition Volume 2 HC; Hellboy Omnibus Volume 2: Strange Places TPB	Redrawn and expanded version of short story from Dark Horse Extra #14–#19
The Nuckelavee	Dark Horse Maverick 2001		July 4, 2001	Saddle stitched	48	1	—	Mike Mignola	b/w COLLECTIONS: Dave Stewart	Frank Miller	—	The Art of Hellboy HC/TPB	1-page pin-up
The Magician and the Snake	Dark Horse Maverick: Happy Endings		September 4, 2002	Square bound	96	5	Mike Mignola, Katie Mignola	Mike Mignola	b/w COLLECTIONS: Dave Stewart	Frank Miller	978-1-56971-820-9	Hellboy in Hell Library Edition HC; Hellboy Omnibus Volume 4 – Hellboy in Hell TPB; The Amazing Screw-On Head and Other Curious Objects TPB	Not in continuity, but a fairy tale in the Hellboy Universe
Dr. Carp's Experiment	The Dark Horse; Book of Hauntings		August 27, 2003	HC	96	13	Mike Mignola		Dave Stewart	Gary Gianni	978-1-56971-958-9	Hellboy Volume 7 – The Troll Witch and Others TPB; Hellboy Library Edition Volume 4 HC; Hellboy: The Complete Short Stories Volume 2 TPB; The Dark Horse Book of Horror HC/TPB	
The Troll Witch	The Dark Horse; Book of Witchcraft		July 7, 2004	HC	96	10	Mike Mignola		Dave Stewart	Gary Gianni	978-1-59307-108-0	Hellboy Volume 7 – The Troll Witch and Others TPB; Hellboy Library Edition Volume 4 HC; Hellboy: The Complete Short Stories Volume 2 TPB; The Dark Horse Book of Horror HC/TPB	
The Ghoul	The Dark Horse; Book of Book of the Dead		June 1, 2005	HC	96	11	Mike Mignola		Dave Stewart	Gary Gianni	978-1-59307-281-0	Hellboy Volume 7 – The Troll Witch and Others TPB; Hellboy Library Edition Volume 4 HC; Hellboy: The Complete Short Stories Volume 2 TPB; The Dark Horse Book of Horror HC/TPB	
The Hydra and the Lion	The Dark Horse; Book of Monsters		December 13, 2006	HC	96	10	Mike Mignola		Dave Stewart	Gary Gianni	978-1-59307-656-6	Hellboy Volume 7 – The Troll Witch and Others TPB; Hellboy Library Edition Volume 4 HC; Hellboy: The Complete Short Stories Volume 2 TPB; The Dark Horse Book of Horror HC/TPB	
The Vampire of Prague	Hellboy Volume 7 The Troll Witch and Others TPB		October 3, 2007	TPB	144	19	Mike Mignola	P. Craig Russell	Lovern Kindzierski	Mike Mignola	978-1-59307-860-7	Hellboy Volume 7 – The Troll Witch and Others TPB; Hellboy Library Edition Volume 4 HC; Hellboy: The Complete Short Stories Volume 1 TPB	
The Whittier Legacy	DH:HD		PART 1: October 11, 2010	Digital	—	4	Mike Mignola		Dave Stewart	—	—	Hellboy Volume 11 – The Bride of Hell and Others TPB; Hellboy Library Edition Volume 6 HC; Hellboy: The Complete Short Stories Volume 2 TPB	
The Whittier Legacy	DH:HD		PART 2: October 12, 2010	Digital	—	4	Mike Mignola		Dave Stewart	—	—	Hellboy Volume 11 – The Bride of Hell and Others TPB; Hellboy Library Edition Volume 6 HC; Hellboy: The Complete Short Stories Volume 2 TPB	
Hellboy versus the Aztec Mummy	Dark Horse Presents; Volume 2	#7	December 21, 2011; CHAYKIN VARIANT COVER: December 21, 2011	Square bound	80	8	Mike Mignola		Dave Stewart	Mike Mignola; VARIANT: Howard Chaykin	—	Hellboy in Mexico TPB; Hellboy: The Complete Short Stories Volume 1 TPB	
Hellboy Gets Married	Dark Horse Presents; Volume 2	#31	PART 1: December 18, 2013	Square bound	80	8	Mike Mignola	Mick McMahon	Dave Stewart	Mike Mignola	—	Hellboy in Mexico TPB; Hellboy: The Complete Short Stories Volume 1 TPB	
Hellboy Gets Married	Dark Horse Presents; Volume 2	#32	PART 2: January 22, 2014	Square bound	80	8	Mike Mignola	Mick McMahon	Dave Stewart	Mick McMahon	—	Hellboy in Mexico TPB; Hellboy: The Complete Short Stories Volume 1 TPB	
The Coffin Man 2: The Rematch	Dark Horse Presents; Volume 3	#7	February 18, 2015; POWELL VARIANT COVER: February 18, 2015	Saddle stitched	80	8	Mike Mignola	Gabriel Bá	Dave Stewart	Mike Mignola; VARIANT: Eric Powell	—	Hellboy in Mexico TPB; Hellboy: The Complete Short Stories Volume 1 TPB	
The Exorcist of Vorsk	Dark Horse Presents; Volume 3	#16	November 18, 2015	Saddle stitched	56	8	Mike Mignola, Todd Mignola	Mike Mignola	Dave Stewart	Brendan McCarthy; FLIP COVER: Mike Mignola	—	Hellboy in Hell Volume 2 – The Death Card TPB; Hellboy in Hell Library Edition HC; Hellboy Omnibus Volume 4 – Hellboy in Hell TPB	

=== Hellboy original graphic novels ===
Special stories were created for hardcover original graphic novels.

Title	Published	Format	Pages	Story	Art	Colors	Cover	ISBN	Collections
House of the Living Dead	November 2, 2011	HC	56	Mike Mignola	Richard Corben	Dave Stewart	Mike Mignola	978-1-59582-757-9	Hellboy in Mexico TPB; Hellboy: The Complete Short Stories Volume 1
The Midnight Circus	October 23, 2013	HC	56	Mike Mignola	Duncan Fegredo	Dave Stewart	Mike Mignola	978-1-61655-238-1	Hellboy: The Complete Short Stories Volume 1
Into the Silent Sea	April 19, 2017	HC	56	Mike Mignola, Gary Gianni	Gary Gianni	Dave Stewart	Mike Mignola	978-1-5067-0143-1	Hellboy Omnibus Volume 2: Strange Places

=== Hellboy collections ===
All in-continuity Hellboy comics are collected in trade paperbacks or hardcover books.

Story cycle	Volume	Title	Collects	Published	Format	Pages	Cover	ISBN	Notes
Hellboy	1	Seed of Destruction	Introduction by Robert Bloch; Seed of Destruction #1–#4; Mike Mignola's Hellboy (promotional comic from San Diego Comic Con Comics #2); Mike Mignola's Hellboy: World's Greatest Paranormal Investigator (promotional comic from Comics Buyer's Guide #1070); Sketchbook; Art gallery (7 pages)	ORIGINAL COVER					
Hellboy	1	Seed of Destruction	Introduction by Robert Bloch; Seed of Destruction #1–#4; Mike Mignola's Hellboy (promotional comic from San Diego Comic Con Comics #2); Mike Mignola's Hellboy: World's Greatest Paranormal Investigator (promotional comic from Comics Buyer's Guide #1070); Sketchbook; Art gallery (7 pages)	October 1, 1994	TPB	128	Mike Mignola	978-1-56971-316-7	
Hellboy	1	Seed of Destruction	Introduction by Robert Bloch; Seed of Destruction #1–#4; Mike Mignola's Hellboy (promotional comic from San Diego Comic Con Comics #2); Mike Mignola's Hellboy: World's Greatest Paranormal Investigator (promotional comic from Comics Buyer's Guide #1070); Sketchbook; Art gallery (7 pages)	LIMITED EDITION					Limited to 1,000 signed-and-numbered copies; 16 extra pages with art from Mike Mignola; Signature plate
Hellboy	1	Seed of Destruction	Introduction by Robert Bloch; Seed of Destruction #1–#4; Mike Mignola's Hellboy (promotional comic from San Diego Comic Con Comics #2); Mike Mignola's Hellboy: World's Greatest Paranormal Investigator (promotional comic from Comics Buyer's Guide #1070); Sketchbook; Art gallery (7 pages)	March 1, 1995	HC in slipcase	150	Mike Mignola	978-1-56971-051-7	Limited to 1,000 signed-and-numbered copies; 16 extra pages with art from Mike Mignola; Signature plate
Hellboy	1	Seed of Destruction	Introduction by Robert Bloch; Seed of Destruction #1–#4; Mike Mignola's Hellboy (promotional comic from San Diego Comic Con Comics #2); Mike Mignola's Hellboy: World's Greatest Paranormal Investigator (promotional comic from Comics Buyer's Guide #1070); Sketchbook; Art gallery (7 pages)	STANDARDIZED COVER					
Hellboy	1	Seed of Destruction	Introduction by Robert Bloch; Seed of Destruction #1–#4; Mike Mignola's Hellboy (promotional comic from San Diego Comic Con Comics #2); Mike Mignola's Hellboy: World's Greatest Paranormal Investigator (promotional comic from Comics Buyer's Guide #1070); Sketchbook; Art gallery (7 pages)	February 4, 2004	TPB	128	Mike Mignola	978-1-59307-094-6	
Hellboy	1	Seed of Destruction	Introduction by Robert Bloch; Seed of Destruction #1–#4; Mike Mignola's Hellboy (promotional comic from San Diego Comic Con Comics #2); Mike Mignola's Hellboy: World's Greatest Paranormal Investigator (promotional comic from Comics Buyer's Guide #1070); Sketchbook; Art gallery (7 pages)	HELLBOY BOOK AND FIGURE SET					Box set with a 4" Hellboy figure; Digest-size hardcover edition; Only Seed of Destruction #1–#4 and 2 pages of figure designs
Hellboy	1	Seed of Destruction	Introduction by Robert Bloch; Seed of Destruction #1–#4; Mike Mignola's Hellboy (promotional comic from San Diego Comic Con Comics #2); Mike Mignola's Hellboy: World's Greatest Paranormal Investigator (promotional comic from Comics Buyer's Guide #1070); Sketchbook; Art gallery (7 pages)	June 11, 2008	HC	112	NEW COVER: Mike Mignola	978-1-59617-604-1	Box set with a 4" Hellboy figure; Digest-size hardcover edition; Only Seed of Destruction #1–#4 and 2 pages of figure designs
Hellboy	2	Wake the Devil	Introduction by Alan Moore; Wake the Devil #1–#5; Wake the Devil Epilogue (5 new pages); Art gallery (7 pages)	ORIGINAL COVER					
Hellboy	2	Wake the Devil	Introduction by Alan Moore; Wake the Devil #1–#5; Wake the Devil Epilogue (5 new pages); Art gallery (7 pages)	June 11, 1997	TPB	144	Mike Mignola	978-1-56971-226-9	
Hellboy	2	Wake the Devil	Introduction by Alan Moore; Wake the Devil #1–#5; Wake the Devil Epilogue (5 new pages); Art gallery (7 pages)	STANDARDIZED COVER					
Hellboy	2	Wake the Devil	Introduction by Alan Moore; Wake the Devil #1–#5; Wake the Devil Epilogue (5 new pages); Art gallery (7 pages)	February 4, 2004	TPB	144	Mike Mignola	978-1-59307-095-3	
Hellboy	3	The Chained Coffin and Others	Introduction by P. Craig Russell; The Corpse (short story from Hellboy #6); The Iron Shoes (short story from Hellboy #6); The Baba Yaga (original short story); A Christmas Underground (short story from Hellboy Christmas Special); The Chained Coffin (short story from Dark Horse Presents #100-2); The Wolves of Saint August (one-shot); Almost Colossus #1–#2 (with 3 new story pages); Art gallery (7 pages)	ORIGINAL COVER					
Hellboy	3	The Chained Coffin and Others	Introduction by P. Craig Russell; The Corpse (short story from Hellboy #6); The Iron Shoes (short story from Hellboy #6); The Baba Yaga (original short story); A Christmas Underground (short story from Hellboy Christmas Special); The Chained Coffin (short story from Dark Horse Presents #100-2); The Wolves of Saint August (one-shot); Almost Colossus #1–#2 (with 3 new story pages); Art gallery (7 pages)	August 5, 1998	TPB	176	Mike Mignola	978-1-56971-349-5	
Hellboy	3	The Chained Coffin and Others	Introduction by P. Craig Russell; The Corpse (short story from Hellboy #6); The Iron Shoes (short story from Hellboy #6); The Baba Yaga (original short story); A Christmas Underground (short story from Hellboy Christmas Special); The Chained Coffin (short story from Dark Horse Presents #100-2); The Wolves of Saint August (one-shot); Almost Colossus #1–#2 (with 3 new story pages); Art gallery (7 pages)	STANDARDIZED COVER					
Hellboy	3	The Chained Coffin and Others	Introduction by P. Craig Russell; The Corpse (short story from Hellboy #6); The Iron Shoes (short story from Hellboy #6); The Baba Yaga (original short story); A Christmas Underground (short story from Hellboy Christmas Special); The Chained Coffin (short story from Dark Horse Presents #100-2); The Wolves of Saint August (one-shot); Almost Colossus #1–#2 (with 3 new story pages); Art gallery (7 pages)	February 4, 2004	TPB	168	Mike Mignola	978-1-59307-091-5	
Hellboy	4	The Right Hand of Doom	Pancakes (short story from Dark Horse Presents Annual 1999); The Nature of the Beast (from Dark Horse Presents #151); King Vold (original short story); Heads (short story from Abe Sapien: Drums of the Dead); Goodbye Mister Tod (short story from Gary Gianni's The MonsterMen); The Vârcolac (new expanded version of short story from Dark Horse Extra #14–#19); The Right Hand of Doom (short story from Dark Horse Presents Annual 1998); Box Full of Evil #1–#2; Box Full of Evil Epilogue (4 new pages); Sketchbook (19 pages)	ORIGINAL COVER					
Hellboy	4	The Right Hand of Doom		April 26, 2000	TPB	144	Mike Mignola	978-1-56971-489-8	
Hellboy	4	The Right Hand of Doom		STANDARDIZED COVER					
Hellboy	4	The Right Hand of Doom		February 4, 2004	TPB	144	Mike Mignola	978-1-59307-093-9	
Hellboy	5	Conqueror Worm	Introduction by Guillermo del Toro; Conqueror Worm #1–#4; Conqueror Worm Epilogue (9 new pages); Sketchbook (5 pages)	ORIGINAL COVER					
Hellboy	5	Conqueror Worm	Introduction by Guillermo del Toro; Conqueror Worm #1–#4; Conqueror Worm Epilogue (9 new pages); Sketchbook (5 pages)	February 27, 2002	TPB	144	Mike Mignola	978-1-56971-699-1	
Hellboy	5	Conqueror Worm	Introduction by Guillermo del Toro; Conqueror Worm #1–#4; Conqueror Worm Epilogue (9 new pages); Sketchbook (5 pages)	STANDARDIZED COVER					
Hellboy	5	Conqueror Worm	Introduction by Guillermo del Toro; Conqueror Worm #1–#4; Conqueror Worm Epilogue (9 new pages); Sketchbook (5 pages)	February 4, 2004	TPB	144	Mike Mignola	978-1-59307-092-2	
Hellboy	6	Strange Places	Introduction by Gary Gianni; The Third Wish #1–#2; The Island #1–#2; The Island Epilogue (6 new pages); The Island unused pages (15 pages); Sketchbook (4 pages)	April 26, 2006	TPB	128	Mike Mignola	978-1-59307-475-3	
Hellboy	7	The Troll Witch and Others	Introduction by Walter Simonson; The Penanggalan (short story from Hellboy Premiere Edition); The Hydra and The Lion (short story from The Dark Horse Book of Monsters); The Troll Witch (short story from The Dark Horse Book of Witchcraft); The Vampire of Prague (original short story); Dr. Carp's Experiment (short story from The Dark Horse Book of Hauntings); The Ghoul (short story from The Dark Horse Book of The Dead); Makoma #1–#2; Sketchbook (13 pages)	October 3, 2007	TPB	144	Mike Mignola	978-1-59307-860-7	
Hellboy	8	Darkness Calls	Introduction by Jane Yolen; Darkness Calls #1–#6; Darkness Calls Epilogue One (4 new pages); Darkness Calls Epilogue Two (7 new pages); Sketchbook (18 pages)	May 16, 2008	TPB	192	Mike Mignola	978-1-59307-896-6	
Hellboy	9	The Wild Hunt	Introduction by Mark Chadbourn; The Wild Hunt #1–#8; Sketchbook (13 pages)	FIRST EDITION					
Hellboy	9	The Wild Hunt	Introduction by Mark Chadbourn; The Wild Hunt #1–#8; Sketchbook (13 pages)	March 10, 2010	TPB	192	Mike Mignola	978-1-59582-431-8	
Hellboy	9	The Wild Hunt	Introduction by Mark Chadbourn; The Wild Hunt #1–#8; Sketchbook (13 pages)	SECOND EDITION					Original cover with additional text THE INSPIRATION FOR THE NEW HELLBOY FILM!
Hellboy	9	The Wild Hunt	Introduction by Mark Chadbourn; The Wild Hunt #1–#8; Sketchbook (13 pages)	October 10, 2018	TPB	192	Mike Mignola	978-1-5067-0748-8	Original cover with additional text THE INSPIRATION FOR THE NEW HELLBOY FILM!
Hellboy	10	The Crooked Man and Others	Introduction by Gahan Wilson; The Crooked Man #1–#3; They That Go Down to the Sea in Ships (one-shot); In the Chapel of Moloch (one-shot); The Mole (short story from Free Comic Book Day 2008); Sketchbook (13 pages)	June 9, 2010	TPB	160	Mike Mignola	978-1-59582-477-6	
Hellboy	11	The Bride of Hell and Others	Hellboy in Mexico (one-shot); Double Feature of Evil (one-shot); The Sleeping and the Dead #1–#2; The Bride of Hell (one-shot); The Whittier Legacy (short story from DH:HD); Buster Oakley Gets His Wish (one-shot); Sketchbook (21 pages)	October 5, 2011	TPB	200	Mike Mignola	978-1-59582-740-1	
Hellboy	12	The Storm and the Fury	Introduction by Glen David Gold; The Storm #1–#3; The Fury #1–#3 (without 2-page recap with art from The Storm); The Storm and the Fury Epilogue (3 new pages); Sketchbook (7 pages)	March 7, 2012	TPB	176	Mike Mignola	978-1-59582-827-9	
Hellboy in Hell	1	The Descent	The Descent (one-shot); Pandemonium (one-shot); Family Ties (one-shot); Death Riding an Elephant (one-shot); The Three Gold Whips (one-shot); Sketchbook (24 pages)	May 14, 2014	TPB	152	Mike Mignola	978-1-61655-444-6	
Hellboy in Hell	2	The Death Card	The Death Card Prologue (3 new pages); The Death Card (one-shot); The Hounds of Pluto #1–#2; The Spanish Bride (one-shot); For Whom the Bell Tolls (one-shot); The Exorcist of Vorsk (short story from Dark Horse Presents Volume 3 #16); Afterword by Mike Mignola; Sketchbook (12 pages)	October 5, 2016	TPB	152	Mike Mignola	978-1-5067-0113-4	
Hellboy in Mexico			Hellboy in Mexico (one-shot); Hellboy versus the Aztec Mummy (short story from Dark Horse Presents Volume 2 #7); Hellboy Gets Married (short story from Dark Horse Presents Volume 2 #31–#32); The Coffin Man (short story from Hellboy 20th Anniversary Sampler); The Coffin Man 2: The Rematch (short story from Dark Horse Presents Volume 3 #7); House of the Living Dead (graphic novel); Sketchbook (17 pages)	April 13, 2016	TPB	152	Mike Mignola	978-1-61655-897-0	
Hellboy Universe Essentials: Hellboy			Introduction by Mike Mignola; The Chained Coffin (short story from Dark Horse Presents #100-2); The Third Wish #1–#2; Pancakes (short story from Dark Horse Presents Annual 1999); The Nature of the Beast (from Dark Horse Presents #151); The Corpse (short story from Hellboy #6); The Baba Yaga (short story from Hellboy Volume 3: The Chained Coffin and Others TPB); A Christmas Underground (short story from Hellboy Christmas Special); The Ghoul (short story from The Dark Horse Book of The Dead); The Troll Witch (short story from The Dark Horse Book of Witchcraft)	July 7, 2021	TPB	160	Mike Mignola	978-1-5067-2503-1	Stories already published in previous collections
Hellboy	The Silver Lantern Club		The Silver Lantern Club #1–#5; Sketchbook (20 pages)	September 7, 2022	HC	136	Christopher Mitten	978-1-5067-2816-2	
Hellboy	The Bones of Giants		The Bones of Giants #1–#4; Sketchbook (18 pages)	September 7, 2022	HC	112	Matt Smith	978-1-5067-2758-5	
Hellboy in Love			Goblin Night #1–#2; Shadow Theater #1–#2; The Key To It All (one-shot); Sketchbook	December 6, 2023	HC	136	Matt Smith	978-1-5067-3309-8	
Hellboy Artists Collection: Richard Corben			Being Human (one-shot); Hellboy in Mexico (one-shot); House of the Living Dead (graphic novel); The Bride of Hell (one-shot); Makoma #1–#2; Double Feature of Evil (one-shot); The Mirror (short story from Free Comic Book Day 2016: Serenity); The Crooked Man #1–#3	May 22, 2024	Oversize HC	312	Richard Corben	978-1-5067-4114-7	Stories already published in previous collections
Hellboy: The Crooked Man & The Return of Effie Kolb			The Crooked Man #1–#3; Hellboy and the B.P.R.D.: The Return of Effie Kolb #1–#2	June 26, 2024	TPB	128	Mike Mignola	978-1-5067-4404-9	Stories already published in previous collections

=== Hellboy library editions ===
These editions collect the stories in oversize volumes with extensive supplemental materials, including previously unreleased sketches and designs.

Volume	Title	Collects	Published	Format	Pages	Cover	ISBN	Notes
1	Seed of Destruction — Wake the Devil	Introduction by Scott Allie; Seed of Destruction TPB; Wake the Devil TPB (without art gallery); Afterword by Mike Mignola; Extended sketchbook (33 pages)	May 7, 2008	Oversize HC	288	Mike Mignola	978-1-59307-910-9	Introduction by Scott Allie was removed in editions printed after 2020
2	The Chained Coffin — The Right Hand of Doom	Introduction by Scott Allie; The Chained Coffin and Others TPB; The Right Hand of Doom TPB; Afterword by Mike Mignola; Extended sketchbook (39 pages)	October 8, 2008	Oversize HC	278	Mike Mignola	978-1-59307-989-5	Story order was re-arranged; introduction by Scott Allie was removed in editions printed after 2020
3	Conqueror Worm — Strange Places	Introduction by Scott Allie; Conqueror Worm TPB; Strange Places TPB; Afterword by Mike Mignola; Extended sketchbook (38 pages)	September 23, 2009	Oversize HC	312	Mike Mignola	978-1-59582-352-6	Introduction by Scott Allie was removed in editions printed after 2020
4	The Troll Witch — The Crooked Man	Introduction by Scott Allie; The Troll Witch and Others TPB; The Crooked Man and Others TPB (without short story The Mole); Afterword by Mike Mignola; Extended sketchbook (47 pages)	June 15, 2011	Oversize HC	312	Mike Mignola	978-1-59582-658-9	Story order was re-arranged; introduction by Scott Allie was removed in editions printed after 2020
5	Darkness Calls — The Wild Hunt	Introduction by Scott Allie; The Mole (short story from Free Comic Book Day 2008); Darkness Calls TPB; The Wild Hunt TPB; Afterword by Mike Mignola; Extended sketchbook (66 pages)	July 11, 2012	Oversize HC	408	Mike Mignola	978-1-59582-886-6	Introduction by Scott Allie was removed in editions printed after 2020
6	The Storm and the Fury — The Bride of Hell	Introduction by Scott Allie; The Storm and the Fury TPB; The Bride of Hell and Others TPB; Afterword by Mike Mignola; Extended sketchbook (73 pages)	June 12, 2013	Oversize HC	376	Mike Mignola	978-1-61655-133-9	Introduction by Scott Allie was removed in editions printed after 2020
—	Hellboy in Hell	Introduction by Scott Allie; The Descent TPB; The Death Card TPB; The Magician and the Snake (short story from Dark Horse Maverick: Happy Endings); Afterword by Mike Mignola; Extended sketchbook (84 pages)	October 11, 2017	Oversize HC	296	Mike Mignola	978-1-5067-0363-3	Introduction by Scott Allie was removed in editions printed after 2020

=== Hellboy omnibus editions ===
Softcover omnibus editions collecting the complete Hellboy series in chronological order.

Volume	Collects	Published	Format	Pages	Cover	ISBN	Notes
Hellboy Omnibus Volume 1: Seed of Destruction	Seed of Destruction #1–#4; The Wolves of Saint August (one-shot); The Chained Coffin (short story from Dark Horse Presents #100-2); Wake the Devil #1–#5; Wake the Devil Epilogue (5 pages); Almost Colossus #1–#2 (with 3 additional story pages); Mike Mignola's Hellboy: World's Greatest Paranormal Investigator (promotional comic from Comics Buyer's Guide #1070); Mike Mignola's Hellboy (promotional comic from San Diego Comic Con Comics #2); Sketchbook (17 pages)	May 9, 2018	TPB	368	Mike Mignola	978-1-5067-0666-5	
Hellboy Omnibus Volume 2: Strange Places	The Right Hand of Doom (short story from Dark Horse Presents Annual 1998); Box Full of Evil #1–#2; Box Full of Evil Epilogue (4 pages); Being Human (one-shot); Conqueror Worm #1–#4; Conqueror Worm Epilogue (9 pages); The Third Wish #1–#2; The Island #1–#2; The Island Epilogue (6 pages); Into the Silent Sea (graphic novel); Sketchbook (13 pages)	June 20, 2018	TPB	416	Mike Mignola	978-1-5067-0667-2	
Hellboy Omnibus Volume 3: The Wild Hunt	The Mole (short story from Free Comic Book Day 2008); Darkness Calls #1–#6; Darkness Calls Epilogue One (4 pages); Darkness Calls Epilogue Two (7 pages); The Wild Hunt #1–#8; The Storm #1–#3; The Fury #1–#3 (without 2-page recap with art from The Storm); The Storm and the Fury Epilogue (3 pages); Sketchbook (9 pages)	July 18, 2018	TPB	528	Mike Mignola	978-1-5067-0668-9	
Hellboy Omnibus Volume 4: Hellboy in Hell	The Descent (one-shot); Pandemonium (one-shot); Family Ties (one-shot); Death Riding an Elephant (one-shot); The Three Gold Whips (one-shot); The Death Card (one-shot); The Hounds of Pluto #1–#2; The Spanish Bride (one-shot); For Whom the Bell Tolls (one-shot); The Magician and the Snake (short story from Dark Horse Maverick: Happy Endings); The Exorcist of Vorsk (short story from Dark Horse Presents Volume 3 #16); Sketchbook (24 pages)	September 5, 2018	TPB	288	Mike Mignola	978-1-5067-0749-5	
Hellboy: The Complete Short Stories Volume 1	Pancakes (short story from Dark Horse Presents Annual 1999); The Midnight Circus (graphic novel); The Nature of the Beast (from Dark Horse Presents #151); King Vold (short story from Hellboy Volume 4: The Right Hand of Doom TPB); Hellboy in Mexico (one-shot); Hellboy versus the Aztec Mummy (short story from Dark Horse Presents Volume 2 #7); Hellboy Gets Married (short story from Dark Horse Presents Volume 2 #31–#32); The Coffin Man (short story from Hellboy 20th Anniversary Sampler); The Coffin Man 2: The Rematch (short story from Dark Horse Presents Volume 3 #7); House of the Living Dead (graphic novel); The Crooked Man #1–#3; The Penanggalan (short story from Hellboy Premiere Edition); The Corpse (short story from Hellboy #6); Double Feature of Evil (one-shot); The Iron Shoes (short story from Hellboy #6); Sketchbook (23 pages)	June 5, 2018	TPB	368	Mike Mignola	978-1-5067-0664-1	
Hellboy: The Complete Short Stories Volume 2	The Hydra and The Lion (short story from The Dark Horse Book of Monsters); The Troll Witch (short story from The Dark Horse Book of Witchcraft); The Baba Yaga (short story from Hellboy Volume 3: The Chained Coffin and Others TPB); The Sleeping and the Dead #1–#2; Heads (short story from Abe Sapien: Drums of the Dead); Goodbye Mister Tod (short story from Gary Gianni's The MonsterMen); The Vampire of Prague (short story from Hellboy Volume 7: The Troll Witch and Others TPB); The Vârcolac (expanded version of short story from Dark Horse Extra #14–#19); The Bride of Hell (one-shot); The Whittier Legacy (short story from DH:HD); Buster Oakley Gets His Wish (one-shot); They That Go Down to the Sea in Ships (one-shot); A Christmas Underground (short story from Hellboy Christmas Special); Dr. Carp's Experiment (short story from The Dark Horse Book of Hauntings); The Ghoul (short story from The Dark Horse Book of The Dead); In the Chapel of Moloch (one-shot); Makoma #1–#2; Sketchbook (25 pages)	August 28, 2018	TPB	368	Mike Mignola	978-1-5067-0665-8	
Hellboy Omnibus Boxed Set	Hellboy Omnibus volumes 1–4 in a slipcase	October 27, 2021	4 TPB in slipcase	1600	SLIPCASE ART: Mike Mignola	978-1-5067-2597-0	
Monster-Sized Hellboy	Hellboy Omnibus volumes 1–4	November 1, 2023	Oversize HC	1512	Mike Mignola	978-1-5067-3505-4	Collects Hellboy Omnibus volumes 1–4 in one hardcover book

== B.P.R.D. ==
=== B.P.R.D. issues ===
B.P.R.D. began as a series of miniseries, but it also had an ongoing numbering on the inside cover of its issues. For the 100th issue the internal numbering shifted to the front cover as the series became a monthly ongoing comic.

Issue	Title	Published	Pages	Story	Art	Colors	Cover	Collections	Notes
#1	Hollow Earth	PART 1: January 30, 2002	32	Mike Mignola, Christopher Golden, Thomas E. Sniegoski	Ryan Sook	Dave Stewart	Mike Mignola	B.P.R.D. Volume 1: Hollow Earth & Other Stories TPB; B.P.R.D.: Plague of Frogs Volume 1 HC/TPB; B.P.R.D. Omnibus Volume 1 TPB	
#2	Hollow Earth	PART 2: April 17, 2002	32	Mike Mignola, Christopher Golden, Thomas E. Sniegoski	PENCILS & INKS: Ryan Sook; INKS: Curtis P. Arnold	Dave Stewart	Mike Mignola	B.P.R.D. Volume 1: Hollow Earth & Other Stories TPB; B.P.R.D.: Plague of Frogs Volume 1 HC/TPB; B.P.R.D. Omnibus Volume 1 TPB	
#3	Hollow Earth	PART 3: June 5, 2002	32	Mike Mignola, Christopher Golden, Thomas E. Sniegoski	PENCILS: Ryan Sook; INKS: Curtis P. Arnold	Dave Stewart	Mike Mignola	B.P.R.D. Volume 1: Hollow Earth & Other Stories TPB; B.P.R.D.: Plague of Frogs Volume 1 HC/TPB; B.P.R.D. Omnibus Volume 1 TPB	
#4	The Soul of Venice	May 14, 2003	32	Miles Gunter, Michael Avon Oeming, Mike Mignola	Michael Avon Oeming	Dave Stewart	Michael Avon Oeming	B.P.R.D. Volume 2: The Soul of Venice & Other Stories TPB; B.P.R.D.: Plague of Frogs Volume 1 HC/TPB; B.P.R.D. Omnibus Volume 1 TPB	
#5	Dark Waters	July 23, 2003	32	Brian Augustyn	Guy Davis	Dave Stewart	Guy Davis	B.P.R.D. Volume 2: The Soul of Venice & Other Stories TPB; B.P.R.D.: Plague of Frogs Volume 1 HC/TPB; B.P.R.D. Omnibus Volume 1 TPB	
#6	Night Train	September 17, 2003	32	Geoff Johns, Scott Kolins	Scott Kolins	Dave Stewart	Scott Kolins	B.P.R.D. Volume 2: The Soul of Venice & Other Stories TPB; B.P.R.D.: Plague of Frogs Volume 1 HC/TPB; B.P.R.D. Omnibus Volume 1 TPB	
#7	There's Something Under My Bed	November 19, 2003	32	Joe Harris	PENCILS: Adam Pollina; INKS: Guillermo Zubiaga	Lee Loughridge	PENCILS: Adam Pollina; INKS: Guillermo Zubiaga	B.P.R.D. Volume 2: The Soul of Venice & Other Stories TPB; B.P.R.D.: Plague of Frogs Volume 1 HC/TPB; B.P.R.D. Omnibus Volume 1 TPB	
#8	Plague of Frogs	PART 1: March 3, 2004	32	Mike Mignola	Guy Davis	Dave Stewart	Guy Davis	B.P.R.D. Volume 3: Plague of Frogs TPB; B.P.R.D.: Plague of Frogs Volume 1 HC/TPB; B.P.R.D. Omnibus Volume 1 TPB	
#9	Plague of Frogs	PART 2: April 7, 2004	32	Mike Mignola	Guy Davis	Dave Stewart	Guy Davis	B.P.R.D. Volume 3: Plague of Frogs TPB; B.P.R.D.: Plague of Frogs Volume 1 HC/TPB; B.P.R.D. Omnibus Volume 1 TPB	
#10	Plague of Frogs	PART 3: May 5, 2004	32	Mike Mignola	Guy Davis	Dave Stewart	Guy Davis	B.P.R.D. Volume 3: Plague of Frogs TPB; B.P.R.D.: Plague of Frogs Volume 1 HC/TPB; B.P.R.D. Omnibus Volume 1 TPB	
#11	Plague of Frogs	PART 4: June 2, 2004	32	Mike Mignola	Guy Davis	Dave Stewart	Guy Davis	B.P.R.D. Volume 3: Plague of Frogs TPB; B.P.R.D.: Plague of Frogs Volume 1 HC/TPB; B.P.R.D. Omnibus Volume 1 TPB	
#12	Plague of Frogs	PART 5: July 7, 2004	32	Mike Mignola	Guy Davis	Dave Stewart	Guy Davis	B.P.R.D. Volume 3: Plague of Frogs TPB; B.P.R.D.: Plague of Frogs Volume 1 HC/TPB; B.P.R.D. Omnibus Volume 1 TPB	
#13	The Dead	PART 1: November 3, 2004	32	Mike Mignola, John Arcudi	Guy Davis	Dave Stewart	Guy Davis	B.P.R.D. Volume 4: The Dead TPB; B.P.R.D.: Plague of Frogs Volume 2 HC/TPB; B.P.R.D. Omnibus Volume 2 TPB	
#14	The Dead	PART 2: December 8, 2004	32	Mike Mignola, John Arcudi	Guy Davis	Dave Stewart	Guy Davis	B.P.R.D. Volume 4: The Dead TPB; B.P.R.D.: Plague of Frogs Volume 2 HC/TPB; B.P.R.D. Omnibus Volume 2 TPB	
#15	The Dead	PART 3: January 19, 2005	32	Mike Mignola, John Arcudi	Guy Davis	Dave Stewart	Guy Davis	B.P.R.D. Volume 4: The Dead TPB; B.P.R.D.: Plague of Frogs Volume 2 HC/TPB; B.P.R.D. Omnibus Volume 2 TPB	
#16	The Dead	PART 4: February 23, 2005	32	Mike Mignola, John Arcudi	Guy Davis	Dave Stewart	Guy Davis	B.P.R.D. Volume 4: The Dead TPB; B.P.R.D.: Plague of Frogs Volume 2 HC/TPB; B.P.R.D. Omnibus Volume 2 TPB	
#17	The Dead	PART 5: March 30, 2005	32	Mike Mignola, John Arcudi	Guy Davis	Dave Stewart	Guy Davis	B.P.R.D. Volume 4: The Dead TPB; B.P.R.D.: Plague of Frogs Volume 2 HC/TPB; B.P.R.D. Omnibus Volume 2 TPB	
#18	The Black Flame	PART 1: August 31, 2005	32	Mike Mignola, John Arcudi	Guy Davis	Dave Stewart	Mike Mignola	B.P.R.D. Volume 5: The Black Flame TPB; B.P.R.D.: Plague of Frogs Volume 2 HC/TPB; B.P.R.D. Omnibus Volume 2 TPB	
#19	The Black Flame	PART 2: September 28, 2005	32	Mike Mignola, John Arcudi	Guy Davis	Dave Stewart	Mike Mignola	B.P.R.D. Volume 5: The Black Flame TPB; B.P.R.D.: Plague of Frogs Volume 2 HC/TPB; B.P.R.D. Omnibus Volume 2 TPB	
#20	The Black Flame	PART 3: October 26, 2005	32	Mike Mignola, John Arcudi	Guy Davis	Dave Stewart	Mike Mignola	B.P.R.D. Volume 5: The Black Flame TPB; B.P.R.D.: Plague of Frogs Volume 2 HC/TPB; B.P.R.D. Omnibus Volume 2 TPB	
#21	The Black Flame	PART 4: November 30, 2005	32	Mike Mignola, John Arcudi	Guy Davis	Dave Stewart	Mike Mignola	B.P.R.D. Volume 5: The Black Flame TPB; B.P.R.D.: Plague of Frogs Volume 2 HC/TPB; B.P.R.D. Omnibus Volume 2 TPB	
#22	The Black Flame	PART 5: December 28, 2005	32	Mike Mignola, John Arcudi	Guy Davis	Dave Stewart	Mike Mignola	B.P.R.D. Volume 5: The Black Flame TPB; B.P.R.D.: Plague of Frogs Volume 2 HC/TPB; B.P.R.D. Omnibus Volume 2 TPB	
#23	The Black Flame	PART 6: January 25, 2006	32	Mike Mignola, John Arcudi	Guy Davis	Dave Stewart	Mike Mignola	B.P.R.D. Volume 5: The Black Flame TPB; B.P.R.D.: Plague of Frogs Volume 2 HC/TPB; B.P.R.D. Omnibus Volume 2 TPB	
#24	The Universal Machine	PART 1: April 12, 2006	32	Mike Mignola, John Arcudi	Guy Davis	Dave Stewart	Mike Mignola	B.P.R.D. Volume 6: The Universal Machine TPB; B.P.R.D.: Plague of Frogs Volume 3 HC/TPB; B.P.R.D. Omnibus Volume 3 TPB	
#25	The Universal Machine	PART 2: May 3, 2006	32	Mike Mignola, John Arcudi	Guy Davis	Dave Stewart	Mike Mignola	B.P.R.D. Volume 6: The Universal Machine TPB; B.P.R.D.: Plague of Frogs Volume 3 HC/TPB; B.P.R.D. Omnibus Volume 3 TPB	
#26	The Universal Machine	PART 3: June 7, 2006	32	Mike Mignola, John Arcudi	Guy Davis	Dave Stewart	Mike Mignola	B.P.R.D. Volume 6: The Universal Machine TPB; B.P.R.D.: Plague of Frogs Volume 3 HC/TPB; B.P.R.D. Omnibus Volume 3 TPB	
#27	The Universal Machine	PART 4: July 5, 2006	32	Mike Mignola, John Arcudi	Guy Davis	Dave Stewart	Mike Mignola	B.P.R.D. Volume 6: The Universal Machine TPB; B.P.R.D.: Plague of Frogs Volume 3 HC/TPB; B.P.R.D. Omnibus Volume 3 TPB	
#28	The Universal Machine	PART 5: August 2, 2006	32	Mike Mignola, John Arcudi	PAGES 1–19: Guy Davis; PAGES 20–24: Mike Mignola	Dave Stewart	Mike Mignola	B.P.R.D. Volume 6: The Universal Machine TPB; B.P.R.D.: Plague of Frogs Volume 3 HC/TPB; B.P.R.D. Omnibus Volume 3 TPB	
#29	Garden of Souls	PART 1: March 14, 2007	32	Mike Mignola, John Arcudi	Guy Davis	Dave Stewart	Mike Mignola	B.P.R.D. Volume 7: Garden of Souls TPB; B.P.R.D.: Plague of Frogs Volume 3 HC/TPB; B.P.R.D. Omnibus Volume 3 TPB	
#30	Garden of Souls	PART 2: April 11, 2007	32	Mike Mignola, John Arcudi	Guy Davis	Dave Stewart	Mike Mignola	B.P.R.D. Volume 7: Garden of Souls TPB; B.P.R.D.: Plague of Frogs Volume 3 HC/TPB; B.P.R.D. Omnibus Volume 3 TPB	
#31	Garden of Souls	PART 3: May 23, 2007	32	Mike Mignola, John Arcudi	Guy Davis	Dave Stewart	Mike Mignola	B.P.R.D. Volume 7: Garden of Souls TPB; B.P.R.D.: Plague of Frogs Volume 3 HC/TPB; B.P.R.D. Omnibus Volume 3 TPB	
#32	Garden of Souls	PART 4: June 13, 2007	32	Mike Mignola, John Arcudi	Guy Davis	Dave Stewart	Mike Mignola	B.P.R.D. Volume 7: Garden of Souls TPB; B.P.R.D.: Plague of Frogs Volume 3 HC/TPB; B.P.R.D. Omnibus Volume 3 TPB	
#33	Garden of Souls	PART 5: July 11, 2007	32	Mike Mignola, John Arcudi	Guy Davis	Dave Stewart	Mike Mignola	B.P.R.D. Volume 7: Garden of Souls TPB; B.P.R.D.: Plague of Frogs Volume 3 HC/TPB; B.P.R.D. Omnibus Volume 3 TPB	
#34	Killing Ground	PART 1: August 8, 2007	32	Mike Mignola, John Arcudi	Guy Davis	Dave Stewart	Guy Davis	B.P.R.D. Volume 8: Killing Ground TPB; B.P.R.D.: Plague of Frogs Volume 3 HC/TPB; B.P.R.D. Omnibus Volume 3 TPB	
#35	Killing Ground	PART 2: September 12, 2007	32	Mike Mignola, John Arcudi	Guy Davis	Dave Stewart	Guy Davis	B.P.R.D. Volume 8: Killing Ground TPB; B.P.R.D.: Plague of Frogs Volume 3 HC/TPB; B.P.R.D. Omnibus Volume 3 TPB	
#36	Killing Ground	PART 3: October 10, 2007	32	Mike Mignola, John Arcudi	Guy Davis	Dave Stewart	Guy Davis	B.P.R.D. Volume 8: Killing Ground TPB; B.P.R.D.: Plague of Frogs Volume 3 HC/TPB; B.P.R.D. Omnibus Volume 3 TPB	
#37	Killing Ground	PART 4: November 14, 2007	32	Mike Mignola, John Arcudi	Guy Davis	Dave Stewart	Guy Davis	B.P.R.D. Volume 8: Killing Ground TPB; B.P.R.D.: Plague of Frogs Volume 3 HC/TPB; B.P.R.D. Omnibus Volume 3 TPB	
#38	Killing Ground	PART 5: December 12, 2007	32	Mike Mignola, John Arcudi	Guy Davis	Dave Stewart	Guy Davis	B.P.R.D. Volume 8: Killing Ground TPB; B.P.R.D.: Plague of Frogs Volume 3 HC/TPB; B.P.R.D. Omnibus Volume 3 TPB	
#39	1946	PART 1: January 9, 2008	32	Mike Mignola, Joshua Dysart	Paul Azaceta	Nick Filardi	Mike Mignola	B.P.R.D. Volume 9: 1946 TPB; B.P.R.D.: 1946–1948 HC/TPB	
#40	1946	PART 2: February 13, 2008	32	Mike Mignola, Joshua Dysart	Paul Azaceta	Nick Filardi	Mike Mignola	B.P.R.D. Volume 9: 1946 TPB; B.P.R.D.: 1946–1948 HC/TPB	
#41	1946	PART 3: March 12, 2008	32	Mike Mignola, Joshua Dysart	Paul Azaceta	Nick Filardi	Mike Mignola	B.P.R.D. Volume 9: 1946 TPB; B.P.R.D.: 1946–1948 HC/TPB	
#42	1946	PART 4: April 9, 2008	32	Mike Mignola, Joshua Dysart	Paul Azaceta	Nick Filardi	Mike Mignola	B.P.R.D. Volume 9: 1946 TPB; B.P.R.D.: 1946–1948 HC/TPB	
#43	1946	PART 5: May 14, 2008	32	Mike Mignola, Joshua Dysart	Paul Azaceta	Nick Filardi	Mike Mignola	B.P.R.D. Volume 9: 1946 TPB; B.P.R.D.: 1946–1948 HC/TPB	
#44	War on Frogs #1	June 11, 2008	32	Mike Mignola, John Arcudi	PENCILS: Herb Trimpe; INKS: Guy Davis	Dave Stewart	Mike Mignola	B.P.R.D. Volume 12: War on Frogs TPB; B.P.R.D.: Plague of Frogs Volume 2 HC/TPB; B.P.R.D. Omnibus Volume 2 TPB	
#45	The Ectoplasmic Man	June 25, 2008	32	Mike Mignola, John Arcudi	Ben Stenbeck	Dave Stewart	Mike Mignola	B.P.R.D.: Being Human TPB	
#46	The Warning	PART 1: July 9, 2008	32	Mike Mignola, John Arcudi	Guy Davis	Dave Stewart	PENCILS: Mike Mignola; INKS: Kevin Nowlan	B.P.R.D. Volume 10: The Warning TPB; B.P.R.D.: Plague of Frogs Volume 4 HC/TPB; B.P.R.D. Omnibus Volume 4 TPB	
#47	The Warning	PART 2: August 13, 2008	32	Mike Mignola, John Arcudi	Guy Davis	Dave Stewart	PENCILS: Mike Mignola; INKS: Kevin Nowlan	B.P.R.D. Volume 10: The Warning TPB; B.P.R.D.: Plague of Frogs Volume 4 HC/TPB; B.P.R.D. Omnibus Volume 4 TPB	
#48	The Warning	PART 3: September 10, 2008	32	Mike Mignola, John Arcudi	Guy Davis	Dave Stewart	PENCILS: Mike Mignola; INKS: Kevin Nowlan	B.P.R.D. Volume 10: The Warning TPB; B.P.R.D.: Plague of Frogs Volume 4 HC/TPB; B.P.R.D. Omnibus Volume 4 TPB	
#49	The Warning	PART 4: October 8, 2008	32	Mike Mignola, John Arcudi	Guy Davis	Dave Stewart	PENCILS: Mike Mignola; INKS: Kevin Nowlan	B.P.R.D. Volume 10: The Warning TPB; B.P.R.D.: Plague of Frogs Volume 4 HC/TPB; B.P.R.D. Omnibus Volume 4 TPB	
#50	The Warning	PART 5: November 12, 2008	32	Mike Mignola, John Arcudi	Guy Davis	Dave Stewart	PENCILS: Mike Mignola; INKS: Kevin Nowlan	B.P.R.D. Volume 10: The Warning TPB; B.P.R.D.: Plague of Frogs Volume 4 HC/TPB; B.P.R.D. Omnibus Volume 4 TPB	
#51	War on Frogs #2	December 10, 2008	32	Mike Mignola, John Arcudi	John Severin	Dave Stewart	Mike Mignola	B.P.R.D. Volume 12: War on Frogs TPB; B.P.R.D.: Plague of Frogs Volume 2 HC/TPB; B.P.R.D. Omnibus Volume 2 TPB	
#52	The Black Goddess	PART 1: January 14, 2009	32	Mike Mignola, John Arcudi	Guy Davis	Dave Stewart	Kevin Nowlan	B.P.R.D. Volume 11: The Black Goddess TPB; B.P.R.D.: Plague of Frogs Volume 4 HC/TPB; B.P.R.D. Omnibus Volume 4 TPB	
#53	The Black Goddess	PART 2: February 11, 2009	32	Mike Mignola, John Arcudi	Guy Davis	Dave Stewart	Kevin Nowlan	B.P.R.D. Volume 11: The Black Goddess TPB; B.P.R.D.: Plague of Frogs Volume 4 HC/TPB; B.P.R.D. Omnibus Volume 4 TPB	
#54	The Black Goddess	PART 3: March 11, 2009	32	Mike Mignola, John Arcudi	Guy Davis	Dave Stewart	Kevin Nowlan	B.P.R.D. Volume 11: The Black Goddess TPB; B.P.R.D.: Plague of Frogs Volume 4 HC/TPB; B.P.R.D. Omnibus Volume 4 TPB	
#55	The Black Goddess	PART 4: April 8, 2009	32	Mike Mignola, John Arcudi	Guy Davis	Dave Stewart	Kevin Nowlan	B.P.R.D. Volume 11: The Black Goddess TPB; B.P.R.D.: Plague of Frogs Volume 4 HC/TPB; B.P.R.D. Omnibus Volume 4 TPB	
#56	The Black Goddess	PART 5: May 13, 2009	32	Mike Mignola, John Arcudi	Guy Davis	Dave Stewart	Kevin Nowlan	B.P.R.D. Volume 11: The Black Goddess TPB; B.P.R.D.: Plague of Frogs Volume 4 HC/TPB; B.P.R.D. Omnibus Volume 4 TPB	
#57	War on Frogs #3	June 10, 2009	32	Mike Mignola, John Arcudi	Karl Moline	Dave Stewart	Mike Mignola	B.P.R.D. Volume 12: War on Frogs TPB; B.P.R.D.: Plague of Frogs Volume 2 HC/TPB; B.P.R.D. Omnibus Volume 2 TPB	
#57 (58)	1947	PART 1: July 8, 2009	32	Mike Mignola, Joshua Dysart	Gabriel Bá, Fábio Moon	Dave Stewart	Mike Mignola	B.P.R.D. Volume 13: 1947 TPB; B.P.R.D.: 1946–1948 HC/TPB	
#58 (59)	1947	PART 2: August 12, 2009	32	Mike Mignola, Joshua Dysart	Gabriel Bá, Fábio Moon	Dave Stewart	Mike Mignola	B.P.R.D. Volume 13: 1947 TPB; B.P.R.D.: 1946–1948 HC/TPB	
#60	1947	PART 3: September 9, 2009	32	Mike Mignola, Joshua Dysart	Gabriel Bá, Fábio Moon	Dave Stewart	Mike Mignola	B.P.R.D. Volume 13: 1947 TPB; B.P.R.D.: 1946–1948 HC/TPB	
#61	1947	PART 4: October 14, 2009	32	Mike Mignola, Joshua Dysart	Gabriel Bá, Fábio Moon	Dave Stewart	Mike Mignola	B.P.R.D. Volume 13: 1947 TPB; B.P.R.D.: 1946–1948 HC/TPB	
#62	1947	PART 5: November 11, 2009	32	Mike Mignola, Joshua Dysart	Gabriel Bá, Fábio Moon	Dave Stewart	Mike Mignola	B.P.R.D. Volume 13: 1947 TPB; B.P.R.D.: 1946–1948 HC/TPB	
#63	War on Frogs #4	December 9, 2009	32	Mike Mignola, John Arcudi	Peter Snejbjerg	Bjarne Hansen	Mike Mignola	B.P.R.D. Volume 12: War on Frogs TPB; B.P.R.D.: Plague of Frogs Volume 2 HC/TPB; B.P.R.D. Omnibus Volume 2 TPB	
#64	King of Fear	PART 1: January 6, 2010	32	Mike Mignola, John Arcudi	Guy Davis	Dave Stewart	Mike Mignola	B.P.R.D. Volume 14: King of Fear TPB; B.P.R.D.: Plague of Frogs Volume 4 HC/TPB; B.P.R.D. Omnibus Volume 4 TPB	
#65	King of Fear	PART 2: February 10, 2010	32	Mike Mignola, John Arcudi	Guy Davis	Dave Stewart	Mike Mignola	B.P.R.D. Volume 14: King of Fear TPB; B.P.R.D.: Plague of Frogs Volume 4 HC/TPB; B.P.R.D. Omnibus Volume 4 TPB	
#66	King of Fear	PART 3: March 10, 2010	32	Mike Mignola, John Arcudi	Guy Davis	Dave Stewart	Mike Mignola	B.P.R.D. Volume 14: King of Fear TPB; B.P.R.D.: Plague of Frogs Volume 4 HC/TPB; B.P.R.D. Omnibus Volume 4 TPB	
#67	King of Fear	PART 4: April 14, 2010	32	Mike Mignola, John Arcudi	PAGES 1–13, 16–22: Guy Davis; PAGES 14–15: Mike Mignola	Dave Stewart	Mike Mignola	B.P.R.D. Volume 14: King of Fear TPB; B.P.R.D.: Plague of Frogs Volume 4 HC/TPB; B.P.R.D. Omnibus Volume 4 TPB	
#68	King of Fear	PART 5: May 12, 2010	32	Mike Mignola, John Arcudi	Guy Davis	Dave Stewart	Mike Mignola	B.P.R.D. Volume 14: King of Fear TPB; B.P.R.D.: Plague of Frogs Volume 4 HC/TPB; B.P.R.D. Omnibus Volume 4 TPB	
#69	HELL ON EARTH; New World	PART 1: August 11, 2010 "#1 FOR $1": March 26, 2014	32	Mike Mignola, John Arcudi	Guy Davis	Dave Stewart	Guy Davis	B.P.R.D.: Hell on Earth Volume 1: New World TPB; B.P.R.D.: Hell on Earth Volume 1 HC/TPB; B.P.R.D. Omnibus Volume 5 TPB	
#70	HELL ON EARTH; New World	PART 2: September 8, 2010	32	Mike Mignola, John Arcudi	Guy Davis	Dave Stewart	Guy Davis	B.P.R.D.: Hell on Earth Volume 1: New World TPB; B.P.R.D.: Hell on Earth Volume 1 HC/TPB; B.P.R.D. Omnibus Volume 5 TPB	
#71	HELL ON EARTH; New World	PART 3: October 13, 2010	32	Mike Mignola, John Arcudi	Guy Davis	Dave Stewart	Guy Davis	B.P.R.D.: Hell on Earth Volume 1: New World TPB; B.P.R.D.: Hell on Earth Volume 1 HC/TPB; B.P.R.D. Omnibus Volume 5 TPB	
#72	HELL ON EARTH; New World	PART 4: November 10, 2010	32	Mike Mignola, John Arcudi	Guy Davis	Dave Stewart	Guy Davis	B.P.R.D.: Hell on Earth Volume 1: New World TPB; B.P.R.D.: Hell on Earth Volume 1 HC/TPB; B.P.R.D. Omnibus Volume 5 TPB	
#73	HELL ON EARTH; New World	PART 5: December 8, 2010	32	Mike Mignola, John Arcudi	Guy Davis	Dave Stewart	Guy Davis	B.P.R.D.: Hell on Earth Volume 1: New World TPB; B.P.R.D.: Hell on Earth Volume 1 HC/TPB; B.P.R.D. Omnibus Volume 5 TPB	
#74	HELL ON EARTH; Gods	PART 1: January 12, 2011; DAVIS VARIANT COVER: January 12, 2011	32	Mike Mignola, John Arcudi	Guy Davis	Dave Stewart	Ryan Sook; VARIANT: Guy Davis	B.P.R.D.: Hell on Earth Volume 2: Gods and Monsters TPB; B.P.R.D.: Hell on Earth Volume 1 HC/TPB; B.P.R.D. Omnibus Volume 5 TPB	
#75	HELL ON EARTH; Gods	PART 2: February 9, 2011	32	Mike Mignola, John Arcudi	Guy Davis	Dave Stewart	Ryan Sook	B.P.R.D.: Hell on Earth Volume 2: Gods and Monsters TPB; B.P.R.D.: Hell on Earth Volume 1 HC/TPB; B.P.R.D. Omnibus Volume 5 TPB	
#76	HELL ON EARTH; Gods	PART 3: March 9, 2011	32	Mike Mignola, John Arcudi	Guy Davis	Dave Stewart	Ryan Sook	B.P.R.D.: Hell on Earth Volume 2: Gods and Monsters TPB; B.P.R.D.: Hell on Earth Volume 1 HC/TPB; B.P.R.D. Omnibus Volume 5 TPB	
—	HELL ON EARTH; Seattle	March 4, 2011	16	Mike Mignola, John Arcudi	Guy Davis	b/w COLLECTIONS: Dave Stewart	Guy Davis	B.P.R.D.: Hell on Earth Volume 1: New World TPB; B.P.R.D.: Hell on Earth Volume 1 HC/TPB; B.P.R.D. Omnibus Volume 5 TPB	Free comic available at Emerald City Comic Con 2011
#77	The Dead Remembered	PART 1: April 6, 2011; MOLINE VARIANT COVER: April 6, 2011	32	Mike Mignola, Scott Allie	PENCILS: Karl Moline; INKS: Andy Owens	Dave Stewart	Jo Chen; VARIANT: Karl Moline	B.P.R.D.: Being Human TPB	
#78	The Dead Remembered	PART 2: May 4, 2011	32	Mike Mignola, Scott Allie	PENCILS: Karl Moline; INKS: Andy Owens	Dave Stewart	Jo Chen	B.P.R.D.: Being Human TPB	
#79	The Dead Remembered	PART 3: June 1, 2011	32	Mike Mignola, Scott Allie	PENCILS: Karl Moline; INKS: Andy Owens	Dave Stewart	Jo Chen	B.P.R.D.: Being Human TPB	
#80	HELL ON EARTH; Monsters	PART 1: July 13, 2011; FRANCAVILLA VARIANT COVER: July 13, 2011	32	Mike Mignola, John Arcudi	Tyler Crook	Dave Stewart	Ryan Sook; VARIANT: Francesco Francavilla	B.P.R.D.: Hell on Earth Volume 2: Gods and Monsters TPB; B.P.R.D.: Hell on Earth Volume 1 HC/TPB; B.P.R.D. Omnibus Volume 5 TPB	
#81	HELL ON EARTH; Monsters	PART 2: August 10, 2011	32	Mike Mignola, John Arcudi	Tyler Crook	Dave Stewart	Ryan Sook	B.P.R.D.: Hell on Earth Volume 2: Gods and Monsters TPB; B.P.R.D.: Hell on Earth Volume 1 HC/TPB; B.P.R.D. Omnibus Volume 5 TPB	
#82	HELL ON EARTH; Russia	PART 1: September 21, 2011	32	Mike Mignola, John Arcudi	Tyler Crook	Dave Stewart	Dave Johnson	B.P.R.D.: Hell on Earth Volume 3: Russia TPB; B.P.R.D.: Hell on Earth Volume 1 HC/TPB; B.P.R.D. Omnibus Volume 5 TPB	
#83	HELL ON EARTH; Russia	PART 2: October 19, 2011	32	Mike Mignola, John Arcudi	Tyler Crook	Dave Stewart	Dave Johnson	B.P.R.D.: Hell on Earth Volume 3: Russia TPB; B.P.R.D.: Hell on Earth Volume 1 HC/TPB; B.P.R.D. Omnibus Volume 5 TPB	
#84	HELL ON EARTH; Russia	PART 3: November 23, 2011	32	Mike Mignola, John Arcudi	Tyler Crook	Dave Stewart	Dave Johnson	B.P.R.D.: Hell on Earth Volume 3: Russia TPB; B.P.R.D.: Hell on Earth Volume 1 HC/TPB; B.P.R.D. Omnibus Volume 5 TPB	
#85	HELL ON EARTH; Russia	PART 4: December 21, 2011	32	Mike Mignola, John Arcudi	Tyler Crook	Dave Stewart	Dave Johnson	B.P.R.D.: Hell on Earth Volume 3: Russia TPB; B.P.R.D.: Hell on Earth Volume 1 HC/TPB; B.P.R.D. Omnibus Volume 5 TPB	
#86	HELL ON EARTH; Russia	PART 5: January 25, 2012	32	Mike Mignola, John Arcudi	Tyler Crook	Dave Stewart	Dave Johnson	B.P.R.D.: Hell on Earth Volume 3: Russia TPB; B.P.R.D.: Hell on Earth Volume 1 HC/TPB; B.P.R.D. Omnibus Volume 5 TPB	
#87	HELL ON EARTH; The Long Death	PART 1: February 15, 2012; MIGNOLA VARIANT COVER: February 15, 2012	32	Mike Mignola, John Arcudi	James Harren	Dave Stewart	Duncan Fegredo; VARIANT: Mike Mignola	B.P.R.D.: Hell on Earth Volume 4: The Devil's Engine & The Long Death TPB; B.P.R.D.: Hell on Earth Volume 2 HC/TPB; B.P.R.D. Omnibus Volume 6 TPB	
#88	HELL ON EARTH; The Long Death	PART 2: March 21, 2012	32	Mike Mignola, John Arcudi	James Harren	Dave Stewart	Duncan Fegredo	B.P.R.D.: Hell on Earth Volume 4: The Devil's Engine & The Long Death TPB; B.P.R.D.: Hell on Earth Volume 2 HC/TPB; B.P.R.D. Omnibus Volume 6 TPB	
#90	HELL ON EARTH; The Long Death	PART 3: April 18, 2012	32	Mike Mignola, John Arcudi	James Harren	Dave Stewart	Duncan Fegredo	B.P.R.D.: Hell on Earth Volume 4: The Devil's Engine & The Long Death TPB; B.P.R.D.: Hell on Earth Volume 2 HC/TPB; B.P.R.D. Omnibus Volume 6 TPB	
#89	HELL ON EARTH; The Pickens County Horror	PART 1: March 28, 2012; MIGNOLA VARIANT COVER: March 28, 2012	32	Mike Mignola, Scott Allie	Jason Latour	Dave Stewart	Becky Cloonan; VARIANT: Mike Mignola	B.P.R.D.: Hell on Earth Volume 5: The Pickens County Horror & Others TPB; B.P.R.D.: Hell on Earth Volume 2 HC/TPB; B.P.R.D. Omnibus Volume 6 TPB	
#91	HELL ON EARTH; The Pickens County Horror	PART 2: April 25, 2012	32	Mike Mignola, Scott Allie	Jason Latour	Dave Stewart	Becky Cloonan	B.P.R.D.: Hell on Earth Volume 5: The Pickens County Horror & Others TPB; B.P.R.D.: Hell on Earth Volume 2 HC/TPB; B.P.R.D. Omnibus Volume 6 TPB	
#93	HELL ON EARTH; The Transformation of J.H. O'Donnell	May 30, 2012; MIGNOLA VARIANT COVER: May 30, 2012	32	Mike Mignola, Scott Allie	Max Fiumara	Dave Stewart	Max Fiumara; VARIANT: Mike Mignola	B.P.R.D.: Hell on Earth Volume 5: The Pickens County Horror & Others TPB; B.P.R.D.: Hell on Earth Volume 2 HC/TPB; B.P.R.D. Omnibus Volume 6 TPB	
#92	HELL ON EARTH; The Devil's Engine	PART 1: May 16, 2012	32	Mike Mignola, John Arcudi	Tyler Crook	Dave Stewart	Duncan Fegredo	B.P.R.D.: Hell on Earth Volume 4: The Devil's Engine & The Long Death TPB; B.P.R.D.: Hell on Earth Volume 2 HC/TPB; B.P.R.D. Omnibus Volume 6 TPB	
#94	HELL ON EARTH; The Devil's Engine	PART 2: June 20, 2012	32	Mike Mignola, John Arcudi	Tyler Crook	Dave Stewart	Duncan Fegredo	B.P.R.D.: Hell on Earth Volume 4: The Devil's Engine & The Long Death TPB; B.P.R.D.: Hell on Earth Volume 2 HC/TPB; B.P.R.D. Omnibus Volume 6 TPB	
#96	HELL ON EARTH; The Devil's Engine	PART 3: July 18, 2012; MIGNOLA VARIANT COVER: July 18, 2012	32	Mike Mignola, John Arcudi	Tyler Crook	Dave Stewart	Duncan Fegredo; VARIANT: Mike Mignola	B.P.R.D.: Hell on Earth Volume 4: The Devil's Engine & The Long Death TPB; B.P.R.D.: Hell on Earth Volume 2 HC/TPB; B.P.R.D. Omnibus Volume 6 TPB	
#95	HELL ON EARTH; Exorcism	PART 1: June 27, 2012	32	Mike Mignola, Cameron Stewart	Cameron Stewart	Dave Stewart	Viktor Kalvachev	B.P.R.D.: Hell on Earth Volume 14: The Exorcist TPB; B.P.R.D.: Hell on Earth Volume 4 HC/TPB; B.P.R.D. Omnibus Volume 8 TPB	
#97	HELL ON EARTH; Exorcism	PART 2: July 25, 2012	32	Mike Mignola, Cameron Stewart	Cameron Stewart	Dave Stewart	Viktor Kalvachev	B.P.R.D.: Hell on Earth Volume 14: The Exorcist TPB; B.P.R.D.: Hell on Earth Volume 4 HC/TPB; B.P.R.D. Omnibus Volume 8 TPB	
#98	HELL ON EARTH; The Return of the Master	PART 1: August 29, 2012; MIGNOLA VARIANT COVER: August 29, 2012	32	Mike Mignola, John Arcudi	Tyler Crook	Dave Stewart	Ryan Sook; VARIANT: Mike Mignola	B.P.R.D.: Hell on Earth Volume 6: The Return of the Master TPB; B.P.R.D.: Hell on Earth Volume 2 HC/TPB; B.P.R.D. Omnibus Volume 6 TPB	
#99	HELL ON EARTH; The Return of the Master	PART 2: September 26, 2012	32	Mike Mignola, John Arcudi	Tyler Crook	Dave Stewart	Ryan Sook	B.P.R.D.: Hell on Earth Volume 6: The Return of the Master TPB; B.P.R.D.: Hell on Earth Volume 2 HC/TPB; B.P.R.D. Omnibus Volume 6 TPB	
#100	HELL ON EARTH; The Return of the Master	PART 3: October 31, 2012	32	Mike Mignola, John Arcudi	Tyler Crook	Dave Stewart	Ryan Sook	B.P.R.D.: Hell on Earth Volume 6: The Return of the Master TPB; B.P.R.D.: Hell on Earth Volume 2 HC/TPB; B.P.R.D. Omnibus Volume 6 TPB	
#101	HELL ON EARTH; The Return of the Master	PART 4: November 28, 2012; MIGNOLA VARIANT COVER: November 28, 2012	32	Mike Mignola, John Arcudi	Tyler Crook	Dave Stewart	Ryan Sook; VARIANT: Mike Mignola	B.P.R.D.: Hell on Earth Volume 6: The Return of the Master TPB; B.P.R.D.: Hell on Earth Volume 2 HC/TPB; B.P.R.D. Omnibus Volume 6 TPB	
#102	HELL ON EARTH; The Return of the Master	PART 5: December 19, 2012	32	Mike Mignola, John Arcudi	Tyler Crook	Dave Stewart	Ryan Sook	B.P.R.D.: Hell on Earth Volume 6: The Return of the Master TPB; B.P.R.D.: Hell on Earth Volume 2 HC/TPB; B.P.R.D. Omnibus Volume 6 TPB	
—	1948	PART 1: October 17, 2012; MIGNOLA VARIANT COVER: October 17, 2012	32	Mike Mignola, John Arcudi	Max Fiumara	Dave Stewart	Dave Johnson; VARIANT: Mike Mignola	B.P.R.D.: 1948 TPB; B.P.R.D.: 1946–1948 HC/TPB	
—	1948	PART 2: November 21, 2012	32	Mike Mignola, John Arcudi	Max Fiumara	Dave Stewart	Dave Johnson	B.P.R.D.: 1948 TPB; B.P.R.D.: 1946–1948 HC/TPB	
—	1948	PART 3: December 19, 2012	32	Mike Mignola, John Arcudi	Max Fiumara	Dave Stewart	Dave Johnson	B.P.R.D.: 1948 TPB; B.P.R.D.: 1946–1948 HC/TPB	
—	1948	PART 4: January 16, 2013	32	Mike Mignola, John Arcudi	Max Fiumara	Dave Stewart	Dave Johnson	B.P.R.D.: 1948 TPB; B.P.R.D.: 1946–1948 HC/TPB	
—	1948	PART 5: February 20, 2013	32	Mike Mignola, John Arcudi	Max Fiumara	Dave Stewart	Dave Johnson	B.P.R.D.: 1948 TPB; B.P.R.D.: 1946–1948 HC/TPB	
#103	HELL ON EARTH; The Abyss of Time	PART 1: January 9, 2013	32	Mike Mignola, Scott Allie	James Harren	Dave Stewart	James Harren	B.P.R.D.: Hell on Earth Volume 5: The Pickens County Horror & Others TPB; B.P.R.D.: Hell on Earth Volume 2 HC/TPB; B.P.R.D. Omnibus Volume 6 TPB	
#104	HELL ON EARTH; The Abyss of Time	PART 2: February 13, 2013	32	Mike Mignola, Scott Allie	James Harren	Dave Stewart	James Harren	B.P.R.D.: Hell on Earth Volume 5: The Pickens County Horror & Others TPB; B.P.R.D.: Hell on Earth Volume 2 HC/TPB; B.P.R.D. Omnibus Volume 6 TPB	
#105	HELL ON EARTH; A Cold Day in Hell	PART 1: March 20, 2013	32	Mike Mignola, John Arcudi	Peter Snejbjerg	Dave Stewart	Dave Johnson	B.P.R.D.: Hell on Earth Volume 7: A Cold Day in Hell TPB; B.P.R.D.: Hell on Earth Volume 3 HC/TPB; B.P.R.D. Omnibus Volume 7 TPB	
#106	HELL ON EARTH; A Cold Day in Hell	PART 2: April 17, 2013	32	Mike Mignola, John Arcudi	Peter Snejbjerg	Dave Stewart	Dave Johnson	B.P.R.D.: Hell on Earth Volume 7: A Cold Day in Hell TPB; B.P.R.D.: Hell on Earth Volume 3 HC/TPB; B.P.R.D. Omnibus Volume 7 TPB	
—	Vampire	PART 1: March 27, 2013	32	Mike Mignola, Gabriel Bá, Fábio Moon	Gabriel Bá, Fábio Moon	Dave Stewart	Fábio Moon	B.P.R.D.: Vampire TPB	
—	Vampire	PART 2: April 24, 2013	32	Mike Mignola, Gabriel Bá, Fábio Moon	Gabriel Bá, Fábio Moon	Dave Stewart	Fábio Moon	B.P.R.D.: Vampire TPB	
—	Vampire	PART 3: May 29, 2013	32	Mike Mignola, Gabriel Bá, Fábio Moon	Gabriel Bá, Fábio Moon	Dave Stewart	Fábio Moon	B.P.R.D.: Vampire TPB	
—	Vampire	PART 4: June 26, 2013	32	Mike Mignola, Gabriel Bá, Fábio Moon	Gabriel Bá, Fábio Moon	Dave Stewart	Fábio Moon	B.P.R.D.: Vampire TPB	
—	Vampire	PART 5: July 31, 2013	32	Mike Mignola, Gabriel Bá, Fábio Moon	Gabriel Bá, Fábio Moon	Dave Stewart	Fábio Moon	B.P.R.D.: Vampire TPB	
#107	HELL ON EARTH; Wasteland	PART 1: May 15, 2013	32	Mike Mignola, John Arcudi	Laurence Campbell	Dave Stewart	Dave Johnson	B.P.R.D.: Hell on Earth Volume 7: A Cold Day in Hell TPB; B.P.R.D.: Hell on Earth Volume 3 HC/TPB; B.P.R.D. Omnibus Volume 7 TPB	
#108	HELL ON EARTH; Wasteland	PART 2: June 19, 2013	32	Mike Mignola, John Arcudi	Laurence Campbell	Dave Stewart	Dave Johnson	B.P.R.D.: Hell on Earth Volume 7: A Cold Day in Hell TPB; B.P.R.D.: Hell on Earth Volume 3 HC/TPB; B.P.R.D. Omnibus Volume 7 TPB	
#109	HELL ON EARTH; Wasteland	PART 3: July 17, 2013	32	Mike Mignola, John Arcudi	Laurence Campbell	Dave Stewart	Dave Johnson	B.P.R.D.: Hell on Earth Volume 7: A Cold Day in Hell TPB; B.P.R.D.: Hell on Earth Volume 3 HC/TPB; B.P.R.D. Omnibus Volume 7 TPB	
#110	HELL ON EARTH; Lake of Fire	PART 1: August 21, 2013	32	Mike Mignola, John Arcudi	Tyler Crook	Dave Stewart	Rafael Albuquerque	B.P.R.D.: Hell on Earth Volume 8: Lake of Fire TPB; B.P.R.D.: Hell on Earth Volume 3 HC/TPB; B.P.R.D. Omnibus Volume 7 TPB	
#111	HELL ON EARTH; Lake of Fire	PART 2: September 18, 2013	32	Mike Mignola, John Arcudi	Tyler Crook	Dave Stewart	Rafael Albuquerque	B.P.R.D.: Hell on Earth Volume 8: Lake of Fire TPB; B.P.R.D.: Hell on Earth Volume 3 HC/TPB; B.P.R.D. Omnibus Volume 7 TPB	
#112	HELL ON EARTH; Lake of Fire	PART 3: October 16, 2013	32	Mike Mignola, John Arcudi	Tyler Crook	Dave Stewart	Rafael Albuquerque	B.P.R.D.: Hell on Earth Volume 8: Lake of Fire TPB; B.P.R.D.: Hell on Earth Volume 3 HC/TPB; B.P.R.D. Omnibus Volume 7 TPB	
#113	HELL ON EARTH; Lake of Fire	PART 4: November 20, 2013	32	Mike Mignola, John Arcudi	Tyler Crook	Dave Stewart	Rafael Albuquerque	B.P.R.D.: Hell on Earth Volume 8: Lake of Fire TPB; B.P.R.D.: Hell on Earth Volume 3 HC/TPB; B.P.R.D. Omnibus Volume 7 TPB	
#114	HELL ON EARTH; Lake of Fire	PART 5: December 18, 2013	32	Mike Mignola, John Arcudi	Tyler Crook	Dave Stewart	Rafael Albuquerque	B.P.R.D.: Hell on Earth Volume 8: Lake of Fire TPB; B.P.R.D.: Hell on Earth Volume 3 HC/TPB; B.P.R.D. Omnibus Volume 7 TPB	
#115	HELL ON EARTH; The Reign of the Black Flame	PART 1: January 15, 2014; MIGNOLA VARIANT COVER: January 15, 2014	32	Mike Mignola, John Arcudi	James Harren	Dave Stewart	Rafael Albuquerque; VARIANT: Mike Mignola	B.P.R.D.: Hell on Earth Volume 9: The Reign of the Black Flame TPB; B.P.R.D.: Hell on Earth Volume 3 HC/TPB; B.P.R.D. Omnibus Volume 7 TPB	
#116	HELL ON EARTH; The Reign of the Black Flame	PART 2: February 19, 2014; CORBEN VARIANT COVER: February 19, 2014	32	Mike Mignola, John Arcudi	James Harren	Dave Stewart	Rafael Albuquerque; VARIANT: Richard Corben	B.P.R.D.: Hell on Earth Volume 9: The Reign of the Black Flame TPB; B.P.R.D.: Hell on Earth Volume 3 HC/TPB; B.P.R.D. Omnibus Volume 7 TPB	
#117	HELL ON EARTH; The Reign of the Black Flame	PART 3: March 19, 2014; HARREN VARIANT COVER: March 19, 2014	32	Mike Mignola, John Arcudi	James Harren	Dave Stewart	Rafael Albuquerque; VARIANT: James Harren	B.P.R.D.: Hell on Earth Volume 9: The Reign of the Black Flame TPB; B.P.R.D.: Hell on Earth Volume 3 HC/TPB; B.P.R.D. Omnibus Volume 7 TPB	
#118	HELL ON EARTH; The Reign of the Black Flame	PART 4: April 16, 2014; SOOK VARIANT COVER: April 16, 2014	32	Mike Mignola, John Arcudi	James Harren	Dave Stewart	Rafael Albuquerque; VARIANT: Ryan Sook	B.P.R.D.: Hell on Earth Volume 9: The Reign of the Black Flame TPB; B.P.R.D.: Hell on Earth Volume 3 HC/TPB; B.P.R.D. Omnibus Volume 7 TPB	
#119	HELL ON EARTH; The Reign of the Black Flame	PART 5: May 21, 2014; NOWLAN VARIANT COVER: May 21, 2014	32	Mike Mignola, John Arcudi	James Harren	Dave Stewart	Rafael Albuquerque; VARIANT: Kevin Nowlan	B.P.R.D.: Hell on Earth Volume 9: The Reign of the Black Flame TPB; B.P.R.D.: Hell on Earth Volume 3 HC/TPB; B.P.R.D. Omnibus Volume 7 TPB	
#120	HELL ON EARTH; The Devil's Wings	PART 1: June 18, 2014	32	Mike Mignola, John Arcudi	Laurence Campbell	Dave Stewart	Laurence Campbell	B.P.R.D.: Hell on Earth Volume 10: The Devil's Wings TPB; B.P.R.D.: Hell on Earth Volume 4 HC/TPB; B.P.R.D. Omnibus Volume 8 TPB	
#121	HELL ON EARTH; The Devil's Wings	PART 2: July 16, 2014	32	Mike Mignola, John Arcudi	Laurence Campbell	Dave Stewart	Laurence Campbell	B.P.R.D.: Hell on Earth Volume 10: The Devil's Wings TPB; B.P.R.D.: Hell on Earth Volume 4 HC/TPB; B.P.R.D. Omnibus Volume 8 TPB	
#122	HELL ON EARTH; The Broken Equation	PART 1: August 20, 2014	32	Mike Mignola, John Arcudi	Joe Querio	Dave Stewart	Laurence Campbell	B.P.R.D.: Hell on Earth Volume 10: The Devil's Wings TPB; B.P.R.D.: Hell on Earth Volume 4 HC/TPB; B.P.R.D. Omnibus Volume 8 TPB	
#123	HELL ON EARTH; The Broken Equation	PART 2: September 17, 2014	32	Mike Mignola, John Arcudi	Joe Querio	Dave Stewart	Laurence Campbell	B.P.R.D.: Hell on Earth Volume 10: The Devil's Wings TPB; B.P.R.D.: Hell on Earth Volume 4 HC/TPB; B.P.R.D. Omnibus Volume 8 TPB	
#124	HELL ON EARTH; Grind	October 15, 2014	32	Mike Mignola, John Arcudi	Tyler Crook	Dave Stewart	Laurence Campbell	B.P.R.D.: Hell on Earth Volume 10: The Devil's Wings TPB; B.P.R.D.: Hell on Earth Volume 4 HC/TPB; B.P.R.D. Omnibus Volume 8 TPB	
#125	HELL ON EARTH; Flesh and Stone	PART 1: November 19, 2014	32	Mike Mignola, John Arcudi	James Harren	Dave Stewart	Laurence Campbell	B.P.R.D.: Hell on Earth Volume 11: Flesh and Stone TPB; B.P.R.D.: Hell on Earth Volume 4 HC/TPB; B.P.R.D. Omnibus Volume 8 TPB	
#126	HELL ON EARTH; Flesh and Stone	PART 2: December 17, 2014	32	Mike Mignola, John Arcudi	James Harren	Dave Stewart	Laurence Campbell	B.P.R.D.: Hell on Earth Volume 11: Flesh and Stone TPB; B.P.R.D.: Hell on Earth Volume 4 HC/TPB; B.P.R.D. Omnibus Volume 8 TPB	
#127	HELL ON EARTH; Flesh and Stone	PART 3: January 21, 2015	32	Mike Mignola, John Arcudi	James Harren	Dave Stewart	Laurence Campbell	B.P.R.D.: Hell on Earth Volume 11: Flesh and Stone TPB; B.P.R.D.: Hell on Earth Volume 4 HC/TPB; B.P.R.D. Omnibus Volume 8 TPB	
#128	HELL ON EARTH; Flesh and Stone	PART 4: February 18, 2015	32	Mike Mignola, John Arcudi	James Harren	Dave Stewart	Laurence Campbell	B.P.R.D.: Hell on Earth Volume 11: Flesh and Stone TPB; B.P.R.D.: Hell on Earth Volume 4 HC/TPB; B.P.R.D. Omnibus Volume 8 TPB	
#129	HELL ON EARTH; Flesh and Stone	PART 5: March 18, 2015	32	Mike Mignola, John Arcudi	James Harren	Dave Stewart	Laurence Campbell	B.P.R.D.: Hell on Earth Volume 11: Flesh and Stone TPB; B.P.R.D.: Hell on Earth Volume 4 HC/TPB; B.P.R.D. Omnibus Volume 8 TPB	
#130	HELL ON EARTH; Nowhere, Nothing, Never	PART 1: April 15, 2015	32	Mike Mignola, John Arcudi	Peter Snejbjerg	Dave Stewart	Laurence Campbell	B.P.R.D.: Hell on Earth Volume 12: Metamorphosis TPB; B.P.R.D.: Hell on Earth Volume 5 HC/TPB; B.P.R.D. Omnibus Volume 9 TPB	
#131	HELL ON EARTH; Nowhere, Nothing, Never	PART 2: May 20, 2015	32	Mike Mignola, John Arcudi	Peter Snejbjerg	Dave Stewart	Laurence Campbell	B.P.R.D.: Hell on Earth Volume 12: Metamorphosis TPB; B.P.R.D.: Hell on Earth Volume 5 HC/TPB; B.P.R.D. Omnibus Volume 9 TPB	
#132	HELL ON EARTH; Nowhere, Nothing, Never	PART 3: June 17, 2015	32	Mike Mignola, John Arcudi	Peter Snejbjerg	Dave Stewart	Laurence Campbell	B.P.R.D.: Hell on Earth Volume 12: Metamorphosis TPB; B.P.R.D.: Hell on Earth Volume 5 HC/TPB; B.P.R.D. Omnibus Volume 9 TPB	
#133	HELL ON EARTH; Modern Prometheus	PART 1: July 15, 2015	32	Mike Mignola, John Arcudi	Julián Totino Tedesco	Dave Stewart	Laurence Campbell	B.P.R.D.: Hell on Earth Volume 12: Metamorphosis TPB; B.P.R.D.: Hell on Earth Volume 5 HC/TPB; B.P.R.D. Omnibus Volume 9 TPB	
#134	HELL ON EARTH; Modern Prometheus	PART 2: August 19, 2015	32	Mike Mignola, John Arcudi	Julián Totino Tedesco	Dave Stewart	Laurence Campbell	B.P.R.D.: Hell on Earth Volume 12: Metamorphosis TPB; B.P.R.D.: Hell on Earth Volume 5 HC/TPB; B.P.R.D. Omnibus Volume 9 TPB	
#135	HELL ON EARTH; End of Days	PART 1: September 16, 2015; MIGNOLA VARIANT COVER: September 16, 2015	32	Mike Mignola, John Arcudi	Laurence Campbell	Dave Stewart	Laurence Campbell; VARIANT: Mike Mignola	B.P.R.D.: Hell on Earth Volume 13: End of Days TPB; B.P.R.D.: Hell on Earth Volume 5 HC/TPB; B.P.R.D. Omnibus Volume 9 TPB	
#136	HELL ON EARTH; End of Days	PART 2: October 21, 2015	32	Mike Mignola, John Arcudi	Laurence Campbell	Dave Stewart	Laurence Campbell	B.P.R.D.: Hell on Earth Volume 13: End of Days TPB; B.P.R.D.: Hell on Earth Volume 5 HC/TPB; B.P.R.D. Omnibus Volume 9 TPB	
#137	HELL ON EARTH; End of Days	PART 3: November 18, 2015	32	Mike Mignola, John Arcudi	Laurence Campbell	Dave Stewart	Laurence Campbell	B.P.R.D.: Hell on Earth Volume 13: End of Days TPB; B.P.R.D.: Hell on Earth Volume 5 HC/TPB; B.P.R.D. Omnibus Volume 9 TPB	
#138	HELL ON EARTH; End of Days	PART 4: December 16, 2015	32	Mike Mignola, John Arcudi	Laurence Campbell	Dave Stewart	Laurence Campbell	B.P.R.D.: Hell on Earth Volume 13: End of Days TPB; B.P.R.D.: Hell on Earth Volume 5 HC/TPB; B.P.R.D. Omnibus Volume 9 TPB	
#139	HELL ON EARTH; End of Days	PART 5: January 20, 2016	32	Mike Mignola, John Arcudi	Laurence Campbell	Dave Stewart	Laurence Campbell	B.P.R.D.: Hell on Earth Volume 13: End of Days TPB; B.P.R.D.: Hell on Earth Volume 5 HC/TPB; B.P.R.D. Omnibus Volume 9 TPB	
#140	HELL ON EARTH; The Exorcist	PART 1: April 20, 2016; MACK VARIANT COVER: April 20, 2016	32	Mike Mignola, Cameron Stewart, Chris Roberson	Mike Norton	Dave Stewart	Duncan Fegredo; VARIANT: David Mack	B.P.R.D.: Hell on Earth Volume 14: The Exorcist TPB; B.P.R.D.: Hell on Earth Volume 4 HC/TPB; B.P.R.D. Omnibus Volume 8 TPB	
#141	HELL ON EARTH; The Exorcist	PART 2: May 18, 2016	32	Mike Mignola, Cameron Stewart, Chris Roberson	Mike Norton	Dave Stewart	Duncan Fegredo	B.P.R.D.: Hell on Earth Volume 14: The Exorcist TPB; B.P.R.D.: Hell on Earth Volume 4 HC/TPB; B.P.R.D. Omnibus Volume 8 TPB	
#142	HELL ON EARTH; The Exorcist	PART 3: June 15, 2016	32	Mike Mignola, Cameron Stewart, Chris Roberson	Mike Norton	Dave Stewart	Duncan Fegredo	B.P.R.D.: Hell on Earth Volume 14: The Exorcist TPB; B.P.R.D.: Hell on Earth Volume 4 HC/TPB; B.P.R.D. Omnibus Volume 8 TPB	
#143	HELL ON EARTH; Cometh the Hour	PART 1: July 20, 2016	32	Mike Mignola, John Arcudi	Laurence Campbell	Dave Stewart	Duncan Fegredo	B.P.R.D.: Hell on Earth Volume 15: Cometh the Hour TPB; B.P.R.D.: Hell on Earth Volume 5 HC/TPB; B.P.R.D. Omnibus Volume 9 TPB	
#144	HELL ON EARTH; Cometh the Hour	PART 2: August 17, 2016	32	Mike Mignola, John Arcudi	Laurence Campbell	Dave Stewart	Duncan Fegredo	B.P.R.D.: Hell on Earth Volume 15: Cometh the Hour TPB; B.P.R.D.: Hell on Earth Volume 5 HC/TPB; B.P.R.D. Omnibus Volume 9 TPB	
#145	HELL ON EARTH; Cometh the Hour	PART 3: September 21, 2016	32	Mike Mignola, John Arcudi	Laurence Campbell	Dave Stewart	Duncan Fegredo	B.P.R.D.: Hell on Earth Volume 15: Cometh the Hour TPB; B.P.R.D.: Hell on Earth Volume 5 HC/TPB; B.P.R.D. Omnibus Volume 9 TPB	
#146	HELL ON EARTH; Cometh the Hour	PART 4: October 19, 2016	32	Mike Mignola, John Arcudi	Laurence Campbell	Dave Stewart	Duncan Fegredo	B.P.R.D.: Hell on Earth Volume 15: Cometh the Hour TPB; B.P.R.D.: Hell on Earth Volume 5 HC/TPB; B.P.R.D. Omnibus Volume 9 TPB	
#147	HELL ON EARTH; Cometh the Hour	PART 5: November 16, 2016	32	Mike Mignola, John Arcudi	Laurence Campbell	Dave Stewart	Duncan Fegredo	B.P.R.D.: Hell on Earth Volume 15: Cometh the Hour TPB; B.P.R.D.: Hell on Earth Volume 5 HC/TPB; B.P.R.D. Omnibus Volume 9 TPB	
#148	THE DEVIL YOU KNOW #1–#5; Messiah	PART 1: July 26, 2017; MIGNOLA VARIANT COVER: July 26, 2017	32	Mike Mignola, Scott Allie	Laurence Campbell	Dave Stewart	Duncan Fegredo; VARIANT: Mike Mignola	B.P.R.D.: The Devil You Know Volume 1: Messiah TPB; B.P.R.D.: The Devil You Know HC/TPB; B.P.R.D. Omnibus Volume 10 TPB	
#149	THE DEVIL YOU KNOW #1–#5; Messiah	PART 2: August 30, 2017	32	Mike Mignola, Scott Allie	Laurence Campbell	Dave Stewart	Duncan Fegredo	B.P.R.D.: The Devil You Know Volume 1: Messiah TPB; B.P.R.D.: The Devil You Know HC/TPB; B.P.R.D. Omnibus Volume 10 TPB	
#150	THE DEVIL YOU KNOW #1–#5; Messiah	PART 3: October 25, 2017	32	Mike Mignola, Scott Allie	Laurence Campbell	Dave Stewart	Duncan Fegredo	B.P.R.D.: The Devil You Know Volume 1: Messiah TPB; B.P.R.D.: The Devil You Know HC/TPB; B.P.R.D. Omnibus Volume 10 TPB	
#151	THE DEVIL YOU KNOW #1–#5; Messiah	PART 4: November 29, 2017	32	Mike Mignola, Scott Allie	Laurence Campbell	Dave Stewart	Duncan Fegredo	B.P.R.D.: The Devil You Know Volume 1: Messiah TPB; B.P.R.D.: The Devil You Know HC/TPB; B.P.R.D. Omnibus Volume 10 TPB	
#152	THE DEVIL YOU KNOW #1–#5; Messiah	PART 5: December 27, 2017	32	Mike Mignola, Scott Allie	Laurence Campbell	Dave Stewart	Duncan Fegredo	B.P.R.D.: The Devil You Know Volume 1: Messiah TPB; B.P.R.D.: The Devil You Know HC/TPB; B.P.R.D. Omnibus Volume 10 TPB	
#153	THE DEVIL YOU KNOW #6–#10; Pandemonium	PART 1: May 9, 2018; MIGNOLA VARIANT COVER: May 9, 2018	32	Mike Mignola, Scott Allie	PAGES 1–3: Mike Mignola; PAGES 4–22: Sebastián Fiumara	Dave Stewart	Max Fiumara, Sebastián Fiumara; VARIANT: Mike Mignola	B.P.R.D.: The Devil You Know Volume 2: Pandemonium TPB; B.P.R.D.: The Devil You Know HC/TPB; B.P.R.D. Omnibus Volume 10 TPB	
#154	THE DEVIL YOU KNOW #6–#10; Pandemonium	PART 2: June 13, 2018	32	Mike Mignola, Scott Allie	Sebastián Fiumara	Dave Stewart	Max Fiumara	B.P.R.D.: The Devil You Know Volume 2: Pandemonium TPB; B.P.R.D.: The Devil You Know HC/TPB; B.P.R.D. Omnibus Volume 10 TPB	
#155	THE DEVIL YOU KNOW #6–#10; Pandemonium	PART 3: July 11, 2018	32	Mike Mignola, Scott Allie	Sebastián Fiumara	Dave Stewart	Max Fiumara	B.P.R.D.: The Devil You Know Volume 2: Pandemonium TPB; B.P.R.D.: The Devil You Know HC/TPB; B.P.R.D. Omnibus Volume 10 TPB	
#156	THE DEVIL YOU KNOW #6–#10; Pandemonium	PART 4: August 8, 2018	32	Mike Mignola, Scott Allie	Laurence Campbell	Dave Stewart	Max Fiumara	B.P.R.D.: The Devil You Know Volume 2: Pandemonium TPB; B.P.R.D.: The Devil You Know HC/TPB; B.P.R.D. Omnibus Volume 10 TPB	
#157	THE DEVIL YOU KNOW #6–#10; Pandemonium	PART 5: September 12, 2018	32	Mike Mignola, Scott Allie	Laurence Campbell	Dave Stewart	Max Fiumara	B.P.R.D.: The Devil You Know Volume 2: Pandemonium TPB; B.P.R.D.: The Devil You Know HC/TPB; B.P.R.D. Omnibus Volume 10 TPB	
#158	THE DEVIL YOU KNOW #11–#15; Ragna Rok	PART 1: December 5, 2018; MIGNOLA VARIANT COVER: December 5, 2018	32	Mike Mignola, Scott Allie	Laurence Campbell, Christopher Mitten	Dave Stewart	Mike Mignola; VARIANT: Mike Mignola	B.P.R.D.: The Devil You Know Volume 3: Ragna Rok TPB; B.P.R.D.: The Devil You Know HC/TPB; B.P.R.D. Omnibus Volume 10 TPB	
#159	THE DEVIL YOU KNOW #11–#15; Ragna Rok	PART 2: January 2, 2019	32	Mike Mignola, Scott Allie	Laurence Campbell	Dave Stewart	Mike Mignola	B.P.R.D.: The Devil You Know Volume 3: Ragna Rok TPB; B.P.R.D.: The Devil You Know HC/TPB; B.P.R.D. Omnibus Volume 10 TPB	
#160	THE DEVIL YOU KNOW #11–#15; Ragna Rok	PART 3: February 6, 2019	32	Mike Mignola, Scott Allie	Laurence Campbell	Dave Stewart	Mike Mignola	B.P.R.D.: The Devil You Know Volume 3: Ragna Rok TPB; B.P.R.D.: The Devil You Know HC/TPB; B.P.R.D. Omnibus Volume 10 TPB	
#161	THE DEVIL YOU KNOW #11–#15; Ragna Rok	PART 4: March 20, 2019	32	Mike Mignola, Scott Allie	Laurence Campbell	Dave Stewart	Mike Mignola	B.P.R.D.: The Devil You Know Volume 3: Ragna Rok TPB; B.P.R.D.: The Devil You Know HC/TPB; B.P.R.D. Omnibus Volume 10 TPB	
#162	THE DEVIL YOU KNOW #11–#15; Ragna Rok	PART 5: April 17, 2019	32	Mike Mignola, Scott Allie	Laurence Campbell, Mike Mignola	Dave Stewart	Mike Mignola	B.P.R.D.: The Devil You Know Volume 3: Ragna Rok TPB; B.P.R.D.: The Devil You Know HC/TPB; B.P.R.D. Omnibus Volume 10 TPB	

=== B.P.R.D. stories in other publications ===
Canon stories originally published in other publications, including original stories in Hellboy Universe collections. If a story was re-printed in a regular issue later, only that issue is mentioned in the column Collections; for other collections, see the entry of the regular issue.

Story title	Publication	Issue	Published	Format	Pages	Pages (story)	Story	Art	Colors	Cover	ISBN	Collections	Notes
Hollow Earth Dark Horse Extra	Dark Horse Extra	#42	PART 1: December 5, 2001	Newspaper format	4	0.5	Christopher Golden	Ryan Sook	Dave Stewart	—	—	B.P.R.D. Volume 1: Hollow Earth & Other Stories TPB; B.P.R.D.: Plague of Frogs Volume 1 HC/TPB; B.P.R.D. Omnibus Volume 1 TPB	Promotional comic for upcoming B.P.R.D. series
Hollow Earth Dark Horse Extra	Dark Horse Extra	#43	PART 2: January 2, 2002	Newspaper format	4	0.5	Christopher Golden	Ryan Sook	Dave Stewart	—	—	B.P.R.D. Volume 1: Hollow Earth & Other Stories TPB; B.P.R.D.: Plague of Frogs Volume 1 HC/TPB; B.P.R.D. Omnibus Volume 1 TPB	Promotional comic for upcoming B.P.R.D. series
Hollow Earth Dark Horse Extra	Dark Horse Extra	#44	PART 3: February 6, 2002	Newspaper format	4	0.5	Christopher Golden	Ryan Sook	Dave Stewart	—	—	B.P.R.D. Volume 1: Hollow Earth & Other Stories TPB; B.P.R.D.: Plague of Frogs Volume 1 HC/TPB; B.P.R.D. Omnibus Volume 1 TPB	Promotional comic for upcoming B.P.R.D. series
Another Day at the Office	B.P.R.D. Volume 2: The Soul of Venice & Other Stories TPB		August 25, 2004	TPB	128	8	Mike Mignola	Cameron Stewart	Michelle Madsen	Mike Mignola	978-1-59307-132-5	B.P.R.D.: Plague of Frogs Volume 1 HC/TPB; B.P.R.D. Omnibus Volume 1 TPB	
Revival	MySpace Dark Horse Presents	#8	PART 1: March 5, 2008	Digital	18	8	John Arcudi	Guy Davis	Dave Stewart	—	—	B.P.R.D. Volume 12: War on Frogs TPB; B.P.R.D.: Plague of Frogs Volume 2 HC/TPB; B.P.R.D.: War on Frogs #5; B.P.R.D. Omnibus Volume 2 TPB; MySpace Dark Horse Presents #2 TPB	8 additional pages in collected version (except in MySpace Dark Horse Presents #2 TPB)
Revival	MySpace Dark Horse Presents	#9	PART 2: April 2, 2008	Digital	18	8	John Arcudi	Guy Davis	Dave Stewart	—	—	B.P.R.D. Volume 12: War on Frogs TPB; B.P.R.D.: Plague of Frogs Volume 2 HC/TPB; B.P.R.D.: War on Frogs #5; B.P.R.D. Omnibus Volume 2 TPB; MySpace Dark Horse Presents #2 TPB	8 additional pages in collected version (except in MySpace Dark Horse Presents #2 TPB)
And What Shall I Find There?	MySpace Dark Horse Presents	#23	June 3, 2009	Digital	18	8	Mike Mignola, Joshua Dysart	Patric Reynolds	Dave Stewart	—	—	B.P.R.D.: 1947 TPB; B.P.R.D.: 1946–1948 HC/TPB; MySpace Dark Horse Presents #4 TPB	
War on Frogs #5	Dark Horse Digital		October 5, 2011	Digital	—	24	John Arcudi	Guy Davis	Dave Stewart	Mike Mignola	—	B.P.R.D. Volume 12: War on Frogs TPB; B.P.R.D.: Plague of Frogs Volume 2 HC/TPB; B.P.R.D. Omnibus Volume 2 TPB	16 of 24 pages originally published in MySpace Dark Horse Presents #8–#9
An Unmarked Grave	Dark Horse Presents; Volume 2	#8	February 1, 2012; DONALDSON VARIANT COVER: February 1, 2012	Square bound	80	8	Mike Mignola; John Arcudi	Duncan Fegredo	Dave Stewart	Duncan Fegredo; VARIANT: Kristian Donaldson	—	B.P.R.D.: Hell on Earth Volume 3: Russia TPB; B.P.R.D.: Hell on Earth Volume 1 HC/TPB; B.P.R.D. Omnibus Volume 7 TPB	
Casualties	Dark Horse Digital		March 1, 2012	Digital	—	8	Mike Mignola, John Arcudi	Guy Davis	Dave Stewart	Guy Davis	—	B.P.R.D.: Being Human TPB; Abe Sapien: The Drowning and Other Stories HC/TPB	

=== B.P.R.D. collections ===
Most of the B.P.R.D. comics have been collected by Dark Horse as trade paperbacks.

Story cycle	Volume	Title	Collects	Published	Format	Pages	Cover	ISBN	Notes
Plague of Frogs	1	Hollow Earth & Other Stories	Hollow Earth #1–#3; Lobster Johnson: The Killer in My Skull (short story from Hellboy: Box Full of Evil #1); Abe Sapien versus Science (short story from Hellboy: Box of Evil #2); Abe Sapien: Drums of the Dead (one-shot); Hollow Earth Dark Horse Extra (short story from Dark Horse Extra #42–#44); Sketchbook (9 pages)	January 29, 2003	TPB	120	Mike Mignola	978-1-56971-862-9	
Plague of Frogs	2	The Soul of Venice & Other Stories	The Soul of Venice (one-shot); Dark Waters (one-shot); Night Train (one-shot); There's Something Under My Bed (one-shot); Another Day at the Office (original short story); Sketchbook (13 pages)	August 25, 2004	TPB	128	Mike Mignola	978-1-59307-132-5	
Plague of Frogs	3	Plague of Frogs	Plague of Frogs #1–#5; Afterword by Mike Mignola; Sketchbook (8 pages)	February 23, 2005	TPB	144	Mike Mignola	978-1-59307-288-9	
Plague of Frogs	4	The Dead	Introduction by John Arcudi; Born Again (short story from Hellboy Premiere Edition); The Dead #1–#5; Afterword by Mike Mignola; Sketchbook (11 pages)	September 28, 2005	TPB	152	Mike Mignola	978-1-59307-380-0	
Plague of Frogs	5	The Black Flame	The Black Flame #1–#6; Afterword by Mike Mignola; Sketchbook (6 pages)	July 12, 2006	TPB	168	Mike Mignola	978-1-59307-550-7	
Plague of Frogs	6	The Universal Machine	The Universal Machine #1–#5; Afterword by Mike Mignola; Sketchbook (7 pages)	January 17, 2007	TPB	144	Mike Mignola	978-1-59307-710-5	
Plague of Frogs	7	Garden of Souls	Garden of Souls #1–#5; Afterword by John Arcudi; Sketchbook (13 pages)	January 30, 2008	TPB	146	Mike Mignola	978-1-59307-882-9	
Plague of Frogs	8	Killing Ground	Killing Ground #1–#5; Afterword by John Arcudi; Sketchbook (8 pages)	May 21, 2008	TPB	140	Mike Mignola	978-1-59307-956-7	
1946–1948	9	1946	1946 #1–#5; Bishop Olek's Devil (short story from Free Comic Book Day 2008); Afterword by Joshua Dysart; Sketchbook (8 pages)	November 5, 2008	TPB	144	Mike Mignola	978-1-59582-191-1	
Plague of Frogs	10	The Warning	Out of Reach (short story from Free Comic Book Day 2008); The Warning #1–#5; Afterword by John Arcudi; Sketchbook (6 pages)	April 15, 2009	TPB	152	Mike Mignola	978-1-59582-304-5	
Plague of Frogs	11	The Black Goddess	The Black Goddess #1–#5; Sketchbook (13 pages); "Latchkey Memories from Crab Point" feature (3 pages)	October 21, 2009	TPB	152	Mike Mignola	978-1-59582-411-0	
Plague of Frogs	12	War on Frogs	War on Frogs #1–#4; Revival (short story from MySpace Dark Horse Presents #8–#9 with 8 new pages); Sketchbook (8 pages)	April 28, 2010	TPB	144	Mike Mignola	978-1-59582-480-6	
1946–1948	13	1947	1947 #1–#5; And What Shall I Find There? (short story from MySpace Dark Horse Presents #23); Afterword by Mike Mignola; Sketchbook (15 pages)	July 7, 2010	TPB	160	Mike Mignola	978-1-59582-478-3	
Plague of Frogs	14	King of Fear	King of Fear #1–#5; Afterword by Mike Mignola; Sketchbook (18 pages)	November 3, 2010	TPB	144	Mike Mignola	978-1-59582-564-3	
Being Human			The Dead Remembered #1–#3; Casualties (short story from Dark Horse Digital); Hellboy: Being Human (one-shot); The Ectoplasmic Man (one-shot); Sketchbook (12 pages)	November 30, 2011	TPB	152	Mike Mignola	978-1-59582-756-2	
Hell on Earth	1	New World	New World #1–#5; Seattle (one-shot short story); Afterword by Mike Mignola; Sketchbook (8 pages)	August 17, 2011	TPB	144	Mike Mignola	978-1-59582-707-4	
Hell on Earth	2	Gods and Monsters	Gods #1–#3; Monsters #1–#2; Sketchbook (19 pages)	January 11, 2012	TPB	144	Mike Mignola	978-1-59582-822-4	
Hell on Earth	3	Russia	Russia #1–#5; An Unmarked Grave (short story from Dark Horse Presents Volume 2 #8); Sketchbook (24 pages)	August 15, 2012	TPB	160	Mike Mignola	978-1-59582-946-7	
Hell on Earth	4	The Devil's Engine & The Long Death	The Devil's Engine #1–#3; The Long Death #1–#3; Sketchbook (27 pages)	December 5, 2012	TPB	176	Mike Mignola	978-1-59582-981-8	
Hell on Earth	5	The Pickens County Horror & Others	The Pickens County Horror #1–#2; The Transformation of J.H. O'Donnell (one-shot); The Abyss of Time #1–#2; Sketchbook (30 pages)	July 17, 2013	TPB	152	Mike Mignola	978-1-61655-140-7	
Hell on Earth	6	The Return of the Master	The Return of the Master #1–#5; Sketchbook (34 pages)	August 7, 2013	TPB	144	Mike Mignola	978-1-61655-193-3	
1946–1948	—	1948	1948 #1–#5; Sketchbook (18 pages)	September 11, 2013	TPB	144	Mike Mignola	978-1-61655-183-4	
Vampire			FIRST EDITION						
Vampire			Vampire #1–#5; Sketchbook (17 pages)	November 27, 2013	TPB	144	Mike Mignola	978-1-61655-196-4	
Vampire			SECOND EDITION						
Vampire			Introduction by Gabriel Bá and Fábio Moon; Vampire #1–#5; Lost Ones (short story from Hellboy Winter Special 2018); Sketchbook (19 pages)	February 27, 2019	TPB	160	Mike Mignola	978-1-5067-1189-8	
Hell on Earth	7	A Cold Day in Hell	Wasteland #1–#3; A Cold Day in Hell #1–#2; Sketchbook (18 pages)	January 22, 2014	TPB	144	Mike Mignola	978-1-61655-199-5	
Hell on Earth	8	Lake of Fire	Lake of Fire #1–#5; Sketchbook (18 pages)	April 9, 2014	TPB	144	Mike Mignola	978-1-61655-402-6	
Hell on Earth	9	The Reign of the Black Flame	The Reign of the Black Flame #1–#5; Sketchbook (18 pages)	September 10, 2014	TPB	144	Mike Mignola	978-1-61655-471-2	
Hell on Earth	10	The Devil's Wings	The Devil's Wings #1–#2; The Broken Equation #1–#2; Grind (one-shot); Sketchbook (22 pages)	March 18, 2015	TPB	144	Ryan Sook	978-1-61655-617-4	
Hell on Earth	11	Flesh and Stone	Flesh and Stone #1–#5; Sketchbook (18 pages)	September 23, 2015	TPB	144	Laurence Campbell	978-1-61655-762-1	
Hell on Earth	12	Metamorphosis	Nowhere, Nothing, Never #1–#3; Modern Prometheus #1–#2; Sketchbook (18 pages)	December 23, 2015	TPB	144	Laurence Campbell	978-1-61655-794-2	
Hell on Earth	13	End of Days	End of Days #1–#5; Sketchbook (10 pages)	May 18, 2016	TPB	144	Laurence Campbell	978-1-61655-910-6	
Hell on Earth	14	The Exorcist	Exorcism #1–#2; The Exorcist #1–#3; Sketchbook (8 pages)	September 21, 2016	TPB	144	Laurence Campbell	978-1-5067-0011-3	
Hell on Earth	15	Cometh the Hour	Cometh the Hour #1–#5; Sketchbook (13 pages)	March 29, 2017	TPB	144	Laurence Campbell	978-1-5067-0131-8	
The Devil You Know	1	Messiah	Messiah #1–#5; Broken Vessels (short story from Hellboy Winter Special); Sketchbook (9 pages)	April 11, 2018	TPB	152	Laurence Campbell	978-1-5067-0196-7	
The Devil You Know	2	Pandemonium	Pandemonium #1–#5; Sketchbook (18 pages)	February 6, 2019	TPB	144	Laurence Campbell	978-1-5067-0653-5	
The Devil You Know	3	Ragna Rok	Ragna Rok #1–#5; Afterword by Mike Mignola; Sketchbook (14 pages)	July 17, 2019	TPB	144	Laurence Campbell	978-1-5067-0814-0	
Hellboy Universe Essentials: B.P.R.D.			Introduction by Mike Mignola; Plague of Frogs #1–#5	December 22, 2021	TPB	136	Mike Mignola	978-1-5067-2502-4	Stories already published in previous collections

=== B.P.R.D. omnibus editions ===
Omnibus editions collecting multiple trade paperbacks.

Volume	Volume (Original Edition)	Collects	Published	Format	Pages	Cover	ISBN	Notes
1	Plague of Frogs Volume 1	Introduction by Scott Allie; Hollow Earth & Other Stories TPB; The Soul of Venice & Other Stories TPB; Plague of Frogs TPB; Extended sketchbook	B.P.R.D.: PLAGUE OF FROGS VOLUME 1					
1	Plague of Frogs Volume 1	Introduction by Scott Allie; Hollow Earth & Other Stories TPB; The Soul of Venice & Other Stories TPB; Plague of Frogs TPB; Extended sketchbook	January 19, 2011	HC	408	Mike Mignola	978-1-59582-609-1	
1	Plague of Frogs Volume 1	Introduction by Scott Allie; Hollow Earth & Other Stories TPB; The Soul of Venice & Other Stories TPB; Plague of Frogs TPB; Extended sketchbook	October 22, 2014	TPB	408	Mike Mignola	978-1-59582-675-6	
1	Plague of Frogs Volume 1	Introduction by Scott Allie; Hollow Earth & Other Stories TPB; The Soul of Venice & Other Stories TPB; Plague of Frogs TPB; Extended sketchbook	B.P.R.D. OMNIBUS VOLUME 1					Story The Killer in My Skull was removed as it is collected in Lobster Johnson Omnibus Volume 2
1	Plague of Frogs Volume 1	Introduction by Scott Allie; Hollow Earth & Other Stories TPB; The Soul of Venice & Other Stories TPB; Plague of Frogs TPB; Extended sketchbook	September 14, 2022	TPB	408	NEW COVER: Mike Mignola	978-1-5067-2949-7	Story The Killer in My Skull was removed as it is collected in Lobster Johnson Omnibus Volume 2
2	Plague of Frogs Volume 2	Introduction by Scott Allie; The Dead TPB; War on Frogs TPB; The Black Flame TPB; Extended sketchbook	B.P.R.D.: PLAGUE OF FROGS VOLUME 2					Story order was re-arranged
2	Plague of Frogs Volume 2	Introduction by Scott Allie; The Dead TPB; War on Frogs TPB; The Black Flame TPB; Extended sketchbook	August 17, 2011	HC	480	Mike Mignola	978-1-59582-672-5	Story order was re-arranged
2	Plague of Frogs Volume 2	Introduction by Scott Allie; The Dead TPB; War on Frogs TPB; The Black Flame TPB; Extended sketchbook	January 21, 2015	TPB	480	Mike Mignola	978-1-59582-676-3	Story order was re-arranged
2	Plague of Frogs Volume 2	Introduction by Scott Allie; The Dead TPB; War on Frogs TPB; The Black Flame TPB; Extended sketchbook	B.P.R.D. OMNIBUS VOLUME 2					Story order was re-arranged
2	Plague of Frogs Volume 2	Introduction by Scott Allie; The Dead TPB; War on Frogs TPB; The Black Flame TPB; Extended sketchbook	November 2, 2022	TPB	480	NEW COVER: Mike Mignola	978-1-5067-2950-3	Story order was re-arranged
3	Plague of Frogs Volume 3	Introduction by Scott Allie; The Universal Machine TPB; Garden of Souls TPB; Killing Ground TPB; Extended sketchbook	B.P.R.D.: PLAGUE OF FROGS VOLUME 3					
3	Plague of Frogs Volume 3	Introduction by Scott Allie; The Universal Machine TPB; Garden of Souls TPB; Killing Ground TPB; Extended sketchbook	March 21, 2012	HC	448	Mike Mignola	978-1-59582-860-6	
3	Plague of Frogs Volume 3	Introduction by Scott Allie; The Universal Machine TPB; Garden of Souls TPB; Killing Ground TPB; Extended sketchbook	March 25, 2015	TPB	448	Mike Mignola	978-1-61655-622-8	
3	Plague of Frogs Volume 3	Introduction by Scott Allie; The Universal Machine TPB; Garden of Souls TPB; Killing Ground TPB; Extended sketchbook	B.P.R.D. OMNIBUS VOLUME 3					
3	Plague of Frogs Volume 3	Introduction by Scott Allie; The Universal Machine TPB; Garden of Souls TPB; Killing Ground TPB; Extended sketchbook	December 21, 2022	TPB	408	NEW COVER: Mike Mignola	978-1-5067-2951-0	
4	Plague of Frogs Volume 4	Introduction by Scott Allie; The Warning TPB; The Black Goddess TPB; King of Fear TPB; Afterword by John Arcudi; Extended sketchbook	B.P.R.D.: PLAGUE OF FROGS VOLUME 4					
4	Plague of Frogs Volume 4	Introduction by Scott Allie; The Warning TPB; The Black Goddess TPB; King of Fear TPB; Afterword by John Arcudi; Extended sketchbook	November 7, 2012	HC	456	Mike Mignola	978-1-59582-974-0	
4	Plague of Frogs Volume 4	Introduction by Scott Allie; The Warning TPB; The Black Goddess TPB; King of Fear TPB; Afterword by John Arcudi; Extended sketchbook	May 20, 2015	TPB	456	Mike Mignola	978-1-61655-641-9	
4	Plague of Frogs Volume 4	Introduction by Scott Allie; The Warning TPB; The Black Goddess TPB; King of Fear TPB; Afterword by John Arcudi; Extended sketchbook	B.P.R.D. OMNIBUS VOLUME 4					
4	Plague of Frogs Volume 4	Introduction by Scott Allie; The Warning TPB; The Black Goddess TPB; King of Fear TPB; Afterword by John Arcudi; Extended sketchbook	February 22, 2023	TPB	456	NEW COVER: Mike Mignola	978-1-5067-2952-7	
1946–1948		Introduction by Scott Allie; 1946 TPB; 1947 TPB; 1948 TPB; Afterword by Chris Roberson; Extended sketchbook	June 10, 2015	HC	472	Mike Mignola	978-1-61655-646-4	Story order was re-arranged
1946–1948		Introduction by Scott Allie; 1946 TPB; 1947 TPB; 1948 TPB; Afterword by Chris Roberson; Extended sketchbook	March 4, 2020	TPB	472	Mike Mignola	978-1-5067-1433-2	Story order was re-arranged
5	Hell on Earth Volume 1	Introduction by John Arcudi; New World TPB; Gods and Monsters TPB; Russia TPB; Extended sketchbook	B.P.R.D.: HELL ON EARTH VOLUME 1					
5	Hell on Earth Volume 1	Introduction by John Arcudi; New World TPB; Gods and Monsters TPB; Russia TPB; Extended sketchbook	December 27, 2017	HC	408	Laurence Campbell	978-1-5067-0360-2	
5	Hell on Earth Volume 1	Introduction by John Arcudi; New World TPB; Gods and Monsters TPB; Russia TPB; Extended sketchbook	March 24, 2021	TPB	448	Laurence Campbell	978-1-5067-1970-2	
5	Hell on Earth Volume 1	Introduction by John Arcudi; New World TPB; Gods and Monsters TPB; Russia TPB; Extended sketchbook	B.P.R.D. OMNIBUS VOLUME 5					
5	Hell on Earth Volume 1	Introduction by John Arcudi; New World TPB; Gods and Monsters TPB; Russia TPB; Extended sketchbook	April 19, 2023	TPB	448	NEW COVER: Mike Mignola	978-1-5067-2953-4	
6	Hell on Earth Volume 2	Introduction by Scott Allie; The Devil's Engine & The Long Death TPB; The Pickens County Horror & Others TPB; The Return of the Master TPB; Extended sketchbook	B.P.R.D.: HELL ON EARTH VOLUME 2					
6	Hell on Earth Volume 2	Introduction by Scott Allie; The Devil's Engine & The Long Death TPB; The Pickens County Horror & Others TPB; The Return of the Master TPB; Extended sketchbook	August 1, 2018	HC	408	Laurence Campbell	978-1-5067-0388-6	In original printing from April 18, 2018, page 153 (last page of The Long Death #3) was missing
6	Hell on Earth Volume 2	Introduction by Scott Allie; The Devil's Engine & The Long Death TPB; The Pickens County Horror & Others TPB; The Return of the Master TPB; Extended sketchbook	August 4, 2021	TPB	480	Laurence Campbell	978-1-5067-2429-4	
6	Hell on Earth Volume 2	Introduction by Scott Allie; The Devil's Engine & The Long Death TPB; The Pickens County Horror & Others TPB; The Return of the Master TPB; Extended sketchbook	B.P.R.D. OMNIBUS VOLUME 6					
6	Hell on Earth Volume 2	Introduction by Scott Allie; The Devil's Engine & The Long Death TPB; The Pickens County Horror & Others TPB; The Return of the Master TPB; Extended sketchbook	August 2, 2023	TPB	480	NEW COVER: Mike Mignola	978-1-5067-2954-1	
7	Hell on Earth Volume 3	Introduction by Scott Allie; A Cold Day in Hell TPB; Lake of Fire TPB; The Reign of the Black Flame TPB; Extended sketchbook	B.P.R.D.: HELL ON EARTH VOLUME 3					
7	Hell on Earth Volume 3	Introduction by Scott Allie; A Cold Day in Hell TPB; Lake of Fire TPB; The Reign of the Black Flame TPB; Extended sketchbook	October 24, 2018	HC	424	Laurence Campbell	978-1-5067-0490-6	
7	Hell on Earth Volume 3	Introduction by Scott Allie; A Cold Day in Hell TPB; Lake of Fire TPB; The Reign of the Black Flame TPB; Extended sketchbook	December 1, 2021	TPB	424	Laurence Campbell	978-1-5067-2430-0	
7	Hell on Earth Volume 3	Introduction by Scott Allie; A Cold Day in Hell TPB; Lake of Fire TPB; The Reign of the Black Flame TPB; Extended sketchbook	B.P.R.D. OMNIBUS VOLUME 7					
7	Hell on Earth Volume 3	Introduction by Scott Allie; A Cold Day in Hell TPB; Lake of Fire TPB; The Reign of the Black Flame TPB; Extended sketchbook	October 4, 2023	TPB	424	NEW COVER: Mike Mignola	978-1-5067-2955-8	
8	Hell on Earth Volume 4	Introduction by Scott Allie; The Devil's Wings TPB; Flesh and Stone TPB; The Exorcist TPB; Extended sketchbook	B.P.R.D.: HELL ON EARTH VOLUME 4					
8	Hell on Earth Volume 4	Introduction by Scott Allie; The Devil's Wings TPB; Flesh and Stone TPB; The Exorcist TPB; Extended sketchbook	January 2, 2019	HC	416	Laurence Campbell	978-1-5067-0654-2	
8	Hell on Earth Volume 4	Introduction by Scott Allie; The Devil's Wings TPB; Flesh and Stone TPB; The Exorcist TPB; Extended sketchbook	March 23, 2022	TPB	416	Laurence Campbell	978-1-5067-2431-7	
8	Hell on Earth Volume 4	Introduction by Scott Allie; The Devil's Wings TPB; Flesh and Stone TPB; The Exorcist TPB; Extended sketchbook	B.P.R.D. OMNIBUS VOLUME 8					
8	Hell on Earth Volume 4	Introduction by Scott Allie; The Devil's Wings TPB; Flesh and Stone TPB; The Exorcist TPB; Extended sketchbook	November 15, 2023	TPB	416	NEW COVER: Mike Mignola	978-1-5067-2956-5	
9	Hell on Earth Volume 5	Introduction by John Arcudi; Metamorphosis TPB; End of Days TPB; Cometh the Hour TPB; Extended sketchbook	B.P.R.D.: HELL ON EARTH VOLUME 5					
9	Hell on Earth Volume 5	Introduction by John Arcudi; Metamorphosis TPB; End of Days TPB; Cometh the Hour TPB; Extended sketchbook	March 20, 2019	HC	416	Laurence Campbell	978-1-5067-0815-7	
9	Hell on Earth Volume 5	Introduction by John Arcudi; Metamorphosis TPB; End of Days TPB; Cometh the Hour TPB; Extended sketchbook	September 7, 2022	TPB	416	Laurence Campbell	978-1-5067-2432-4	
9	Hell on Earth Volume 5	Introduction by John Arcudi; Metamorphosis TPB; End of Days TPB; Cometh the Hour TPB; Extended sketchbook	B.P.R.D. OMNIBUS VOLUME 9					
9	Hell on Earth Volume 5	Introduction by John Arcudi; Metamorphosis TPB; End of Days TPB; Cometh the Hour TPB; Extended sketchbook	January 3, 2024	TPB	416	NEW COVER: Mike Mignola	978-1-5067-2957-2	
10	The Devil You Know	Introduction by Laurence Campbell; Messiah TPB; Pandemonium TPB; Ragna Rok TPB; Extended sketchbook	B.P.R.D.: THE DEVIL YOU KNOW					
10	The Devil You Know	Introduction by Laurence Campbell; Messiah TPB; Pandemonium TPB; Ragna Rok TPB; Extended sketchbook	March 17, 2021	HC	440	Mike Mignola	978-1-5067-1971-9	
10	The Devil You Know	Introduction by Laurence Campbell; Messiah TPB; Pandemonium TPB; Ragna Rok TPB; Extended sketchbook	May 25, 2022	TPB	432	Mike Mignola	978-1-5067-2923-7	
10	The Devil You Know	Introduction by Laurence Campbell; Messiah TPB; Pandemonium TPB; Ragna Rok TPB; Extended sketchbook	B.P.R.D. OMNIBUS VOLUME 10					
10	The Devil You Know	Introduction by Laurence Campbell; Messiah TPB; Pandemonium TPB; Ragna Rok TPB; Extended sketchbook	March 6, 2024	TPB	432	NEW COVER: Mike Mignola	978-1-5067-2958-9	

== Hellboy and the B.P.R.D. ==
=== Hellboy and the B.P.R.D. issues ===
Hellboy and the B.P.R.D. is an ongoing series of miniseries.

Issue	Title	Published	Pages	Story	Art	Colors	Cover	Collections
#1	1952	PART 1: December 3, 2014; MIGNOLA VARIANT COVER: December 3, 2014	32	Mike Mignola, John Arcudi	Alex Maleev	Dave Stewart	Alex Maleev; PENCIL VARIANT: Mike Mignola	Hellboy and the B.P.R.D.: 1952 TPB; Hellboy and the B.P.R.D.: 1952–1954 HC/TPB
#2	1952	PART 2: January 7, 2015	32	Mike Mignola, John Arcudi	Alex Maleev	Dave Stewart	Alex Maleev	Hellboy and the B.P.R.D.: 1952 TPB; Hellboy and the B.P.R.D.: 1952–1954 HC/TPB
#3	1952	PART 3: February 4, 2015	32	Mike Mignola, John Arcudi	Alex Maleev	Dave Stewart	Alex Maleev	Hellboy and the B.P.R.D.: 1952 TPB; Hellboy and the B.P.R.D.: 1952–1954 HC/TPB
#4	1952	PART 4: March 4, 2015	32	Mike Mignola, John Arcudi	Alex Maleev	Dave Stewart	Alex Maleev	Hellboy and the B.P.R.D.: 1952 TPB; Hellboy and the B.P.R.D.: 1952–1954 HC/TPB
#5	1952	PART 5: April 1, 2015	32	Mike Mignola, John Arcudi	Alex Maleev	Dave Stewart	Alex Maleev	Hellboy and the B.P.R.D.: 1952 TPB; Hellboy and the B.P.R.D.: 1952–1954 HC/TPB
#6	1953 – The Phantom Hand & The Kelpie	October 28, 2015; HALLOWEEN COMICFEST 2018: October 27, 2018	32	The Phantom Hand			Mike Mignola	Hellboy and the B.P.R.D.: 1953 TPB; Hellboy and the B.P.R.D.: 1952–1954 HC/TPB
#6	1953 – The Phantom Hand & The Kelpie	October 28, 2015; HALLOWEEN COMICFEST 2018: October 27, 2018	32	Mike Mignola	Ben Stenbeck	Dave Stewart	Mike Mignola	Hellboy and the B.P.R.D.: 1953 TPB; Hellboy and the B.P.R.D.: 1952–1954 HC/TPB
#6	1953 – The Phantom Hand & The Kelpie	October 28, 2015; HALLOWEEN COMICFEST 2018: October 27, 2018	32	The Kelpie			Mike Mignola	Hellboy and the B.P.R.D.: 1953 TPB; Hellboy and the B.P.R.D.: 1952–1954 HC/TPB
#6	1953 – The Phantom Hand & The Kelpie	October 28, 2015; HALLOWEEN COMICFEST 2018: October 27, 2018	32	Mike Mignola	Ben Stenbeck	Dave Stewart	Mike Mignola	Hellboy and the B.P.R.D.: 1953 TPB; Hellboy and the B.P.R.D.: 1952–1954 HC/TPB
#7	1953 – The Witch Tree & Rawhead and Bloody Bones	November 25, 2015; HALLOWEEN COMICFEST 2017: October 28, 2017	32	The Witch Tree			Mike Mignola	Hellboy and the B.P.R.D.: 1953 TPB; Hellboy and the B.P.R.D.: 1952–1954 HC/TPB
#7	1953 – The Witch Tree & Rawhead and Bloody Bones	November 25, 2015; HALLOWEEN COMICFEST 2017: October 28, 2017	32	Mike Mignola	Ben Stenbeck	Dave Stewart	Mike Mignola	Hellboy and the B.P.R.D.: 1953 TPB; Hellboy and the B.P.R.D.: 1952–1954 HC/TPB
#7	1953 – The Witch Tree & Rawhead and Bloody Bones	November 25, 2015; HALLOWEEN COMICFEST 2017: October 28, 2017	32	Rawhead and Bloody Bones			Mike Mignola	Hellboy and the B.P.R.D.: 1953 TPB; Hellboy and the B.P.R.D.: 1952–1954 HC/TPB
#7	1953 – The Witch Tree & Rawhead and Bloody Bones	November 25, 2015; HALLOWEEN COMICFEST 2017: October 28, 2017	32	Mike Mignola	Ben Stenbeck	Dave Stewart	Mike Mignola	Hellboy and the B.P.R.D.: 1953 TPB; Hellboy and the B.P.R.D.: 1952–1954 HC/TPB
#8	1953 – Beyond the Fences	PART 1: February 24, 2016; MACK VARIANT COVER: February 24, 2016	32	Mike Mignola, Chris Roberson	PENCILS: Paolo Rivera; INKS: Joe Rivera	Dave Stewart	Paolo Rivera; VARIANT: David Mack	Hellboy and the B.P.R.D.: 1953 TPB; Hellboy and the B.P.R.D.: 1952–1954 HC/TPB
#9	1953 – Beyond the Fences	PART 2: March 23, 2016	32	Mike Mignola, Chris Roberson	PENCILS: Paolo Rivera; INKS: Joe Rivera	Dave Stewart	Paolo Rivera; VARIANT: David Mack	Hellboy and the B.P.R.D.: 1953 TPB; Hellboy and the B.P.R.D.: 1952–1954 HC/TPB
#10	1953 – Beyond the Fences	PART 3: April 27, 2016	32	Mike Mignola, Chris Roberson	PENCILS: Paolo Rivera; INKS: Joe Rivera	Dave Stewart	Paolo Rivera; VARIANT: David Mack	Hellboy and the B.P.R.D.: 1953 TPB; Hellboy and the B.P.R.D.: 1952–1954 HC/TPB
#11	1954 – The Black Sun	PART 1: September 21, 2016	32	Mike Mignola, Chris Roberson	Stephen Green	Dave Stewart	Mike Huddleston	Hellboy and the B.P.R.D.: 1954 TPB; Hellboy and the B.P.R.D.: 1952–1954 HC/TPB
#12	1954 – The Black Sun	PART 2: October 19, 2016	32	Mike Mignola, Chris Roberson	Stephen Green	Dave Stewart	Mike Huddleston	Hellboy and the B.P.R.D.: 1954 TPB; Hellboy and the B.P.R.D.: 1952–1954 HC/TPB
#13	1954 – The Unreasoning Beast	November 23, 2016; NERD BLOCK VARIANT COVER: November 23, 2016	32	Mike Mignola, Chris Roberson	Patric Reynolds	Dave Stewart	Mike Huddleston; NERD BLOCK EXCLUSIVE VARIANT: Eric Canete	Hellboy and the B.P.R.D.: 1954 TPB; Hellboy and the B.P.R.D.: 1952–1954 HC/TPB
#14	1954 – Ghost Moon	PART 1: March 8, 2017	32	Mike Mignola, Chris Roberson	Brian Churilla	Dave Stewart	Mike Huddleston	Hellboy and the B.P.R.D.: 1954 TPB; Hellboy and the B.P.R.D.: 1952–1954 HC/TPB
#15	1954 – Ghost Moon	PART 2: April 12, 2017	32	Mike Mignola, Chris Roberson	Brian Churilla	Dave Stewart	Mike Huddleston	Hellboy and the B.P.R.D.: 1954 TPB; Hellboy and the B.P.R.D.: 1952–1954 HC/TPB
#16	1955 – Secret Nature	August 9, 2017	32	Mike Mignola, Chris Roberson	Shawn Martinbrough	Dave Stewart	Shawn Martinbrough	Hellboy and the B.P.R.D.: 1955 TPB; Hellboy and the B.P.R.D.: 1955–1957 HC/TPB
#17	1955 – Occult Intelligence	PART 1: September 13, 2017	32	Mike Mignola, Chris Roberson	Brian Churilla	Dave Stewart	Paolo Rivera	Hellboy and the B.P.R.D.: 1955 TPB; Hellboy and the B.P.R.D.: 1955–1957 HC/TPB
#18	1955 – Occult Intelligence	PART 2: October 11, 2017	32	Mike Mignola, Chris Roberson	Brian Churilla	Dave Stewart	Paolo Rivera	Hellboy and the B.P.R.D.: 1955 TPB; Hellboy and the B.P.R.D.: 1955–1957 HC/TPB
#19	1955 – Occult Intelligence	PART 3: November 8, 2017	32	Mike Mignola, Chris Roberson	Brian Churilla	Dave Stewart	Paolo Rivera	Hellboy and the B.P.R.D.: 1955 TPB; Hellboy and the B.P.R.D.: 1955–1957 HC/TPB
#20	1955 – Burning Season	February 21, 2018	32	Mike Mignola, Chris Roberson	PENCILS: Paolo Rivera; INKS: Joe Rivera	Dave Stewart	Paolo Rivera	Hellboy and the B.P.R.D.: 1955 TPB; Hellboy and the B.P.R.D.: 1955–1957 HC/TPB
#21	1956	PART 1: November 28, 2018	32	Mike Mignola, Chris Roberson	Yishan Li, Mike Norton, Michael Avon Oeming	Dave Stewart	Dave Johnson	Hellboy and the B.P.R.D.: 1956 TPB; Hellboy and the B.P.R.D.: 1955–1957 HC/TPB
#22	1956	PART 2: December 26, 2019	32	Mike Mignola, Chris Roberson	Yishan Li, Mike Norton, Michael Avon Oeming	Dave Stewart	Dave Johnson	Hellboy and the B.P.R.D.: 1956 TPB; Hellboy and the B.P.R.D.: 1955–1957 HC/TPB
#23	1956	PART 3: January 23, 2019	32	Mike Mignola, Chris Roberson	Yishan Li, Mike Norton, Michael Avon Oeming	Dave Stewart	Dave Johnson	Hellboy and the B.P.R.D.: 1956 TPB; Hellboy and the B.P.R.D.: 1955–1957 HC/TPB
#24	1956	PART 4: February 27, 2019	32	Mike Mignola, Chris Roberson	Yishan Li, Mike Norton, Michael Avon Oeming	Dave Stewart	Dave Johnson	Hellboy and the B.P.R.D.: 1956 TPB; Hellboy and the B.P.R.D.: 1955–1957 HC/TPB
#25	1956	PART 5: March 27, 2019	32	Mike Mignola, Chris Roberson	Yishan Li, Mike Norton, Michael Avon Oeming	Dave Stewart	Dave Johnson	Hellboy and the B.P.R.D.: 1956 TPB; Hellboy and the B.P.R.D.: 1955–1957 HC/TPB
—	The Beast of Vargu	June 19, 2019; MIGNOLA VARIANT COVER: June 19, 2019	32	The Beast of Vargu			Duncan Fegredo; VARIANT: Mike Mignola	Hellboy and the B.P.R.D.: The Beast of Vargu and Others TPB
—	The Beast of Vargu	June 19, 2019; MIGNOLA VARIANT COVER: June 19, 2019	32	Mike Mignola	Duncan Fegredo	Dave Stewart	Duncan Fegredo; VARIANT: Mike Mignola	Hellboy and the B.P.R.D.: The Beast of Vargu and Others TPB
—	The Beast of Vargu	June 19, 2019; MIGNOLA VARIANT COVER: June 19, 2019	32	The Secret God of the Roma			Duncan Fegredo; VARIANT: Mike Mignola	Hellboy and the B.P.R.D.: The Beast of Vargu and Others TPB
—	The Beast of Vargu	June 19, 2019; MIGNOLA VARIANT COVER: June 19, 2019	32	Mike Mignola	Duncan Fegredo	Dave Stewart	Duncan Fegredo; VARIANT: Mike Mignola	Hellboy and the B.P.R.D.: The Beast of Vargu and Others TPB
—	Saturn Returns	PART 1: August 21, 2019	32	Mike Mignola, Scott Allie	Christopher Mitten	Brennan Wagner	Christopher Mitten	Hellboy and the B.P.R.D.: The Beast of Vargu and Others TPB
—	Saturn Returns	PART 2: September 18, 2019	32	Mike Mignola, Scott Allie	Christopher Mitten	Brennan Wagner	Christopher Mitten	Hellboy and the B.P.R.D.: The Beast of Vargu and Others TPB
—	Saturn Returns	PART 3: October 23, 2019	32	Mike Mignola, Scott Allie	Christopher Mitten	Brennan Wagner	Christopher Mitten	Hellboy and the B.P.R.D.: The Beast of Vargu and Others TPB
—	Long Night at Goloski Station	October 30, 2019	32	Mike Mignola	Matt Smith	Dave Stewart	Mike Mignola	Hellboy and the B.P.R.D.: The Return of Effie Kolb TPB
—	The Return of Effie Kolb	PART 1: February 19, 2020; MIGNOLA VARIANT COVER: February 19, 2020	32	Mike Mignola	Zach Howard	Dave Stewart	Zach Howard; VARIANT: Mike Mignola	Hellboy and the B.P.R.D.: The Return of Effie Kolb TPB
—	The Return of Effie Kolb	PART 2: October 28, 2020	32	Mike Mignola	Zach Howard	Dave Stewart	Zach Howard	Hellboy and the B.P.R.D.: The Return of Effie Kolb TPB
—	The Seven Wives Club	November 11, 2020; B/W VARIANT COVER: November 11, 2020; MIGNOLA VARIANT COVER: November 11, 2020	32	Mike Mignola	Adam Hughes	Adam Hughes	Adam Hughes; B/W VARIANT: Adam Hughes; VARIANT: Mike Mignola	Hellboy and the B.P.R.D.: The Return of Effie Kolb TPB
—	Her Fatal Hour & The Sending	December 2, 2020; MIGNOLA VARIANT COVER: December 2, 2020	32	Her Fatal Hour			Tiernen Trevallion; VARIANT: Mike Mignola	Hellboy and the B.P.R.D.: The Return of Effie Kolb TPB
—	Her Fatal Hour & The Sending	December 2, 2020; MIGNOLA VARIANT COVER: December 2, 2020	32	Mike Mignola	Tiernen Trevallion	Dave Stewart	Tiernen Trevallion; VARIANT: Mike Mignola	Hellboy and the B.P.R.D.: The Return of Effie Kolb TPB
—	Her Fatal Hour & The Sending	December 2, 2020; MIGNOLA VARIANT COVER: December 2, 2020	32	The Sending			Tiernen Trevallion; VARIANT: Mike Mignola	Hellboy and the B.P.R.D.: The Return of Effie Kolb TPB
—	Her Fatal Hour & The Sending	December 2, 2020; MIGNOLA VARIANT COVER: December 2, 2020	32	Mike Mignola	Tiernen Trevallion	Dave Stewart	Tiernen Trevallion; VARIANT: Mike Mignola	Hellboy and the B.P.R.D.: The Return of Effie Kolb TPB
—	The Secret of Chesbro House	PART 1: July 07, 2021; STENBECK VARIANT COVER: July 07, 2021	32	Mike Mignola, Chris Roberson	Shawn McManus	Dave Stewart	Shawn McManus; VARIANT: Ben Stenbeck	Hellboy and the B.P.R.D.: The Secret of Chesbro House TPB
—	The Secret of Chesbro House	PART 2: August 11, 2021; SMITH VARIANT COVER: August 11, 2021	32	Mike Mignola, Chris Roberson	Shawn McManus	Dave Stewart	Shawn McManus; VARIANT: Matt Smith	Hellboy and the B.P.R.D.: The Secret of Chesbro House TPB
—	1957 – Family Ties	September 15, 2021	32	Mike Mignola, Chris Roberson	Laurence Campbell	Dave Stewart	Laurence Campbell	Hellboy and the B.P.R.D.: 1957 TPB; Hellboy and the B.P.R.D.: 1955–1957 HC/TPB
—	1957 – Forgotten Lives	February 9, 2022	32	Mike Mignola, Chris Roberson	Steven Green	Dave Stewart	Laurence Campbell	Hellboy and the B.P.R.D.: 1957 TPB; Hellboy and the B.P.R.D.: 1955–1957 HC/TPB
—	Night of the Cyclops	May 25, 2022; MIGNOLA VARIANT COVER: May 25, 2022	32	Mike Mignola, Olivier Vitane	Olivier Vitane	Olivier Vitane	Olivier Vitane; VARIANT: Mike Mignola	Hellboy and the B.P.R.D.: The Secret of Chesbro House TPB
—	Old Man Whittier	June 29, 2022; MIGNOLA VARIANT COVER: June 29, 2022	32	Mike Mignola	Gabriel Hernández Walta	Dave Stewart	Gabriel Hernández Walta; VARIANT: Mike Mignola	Hellboy and the B.P.R.D.: The Secret of Chesbro House TPB
—	Time is a River	July 20, 2022; MIGNOLA VARIANT COVER: July 20, 2022	32	Mike Mignola	Márk László	Dave Stewart	Márk László; VARIANT: Mike Mignola	Hellboy and the B.P.R.D.: The Secret of Chesbro House TPB
—	1957 - Falling Sky	August 10, 2022	32	Mike Mignola, Chris Roberson	Shawn Martinbrough	Dave Stewart	Laurence Campbell	Hellboy and the B.P.R.D.: 1957 TPB; Hellboy and the B.P.R.D.: 1955–1957 HC/TPB
—	1957 – Fearful Symmetry	June 28, 2023	32	Mike Mignola, Chris Roberson	Alison Sampson	Dave Stewart	Laurence Campbell	Hellboy and the B.P.R.D.: 1957 TPB; Hellboy and the B.P.R.D.: 1955–1957 HC/TPB
—	1957 – From Below	August 2, 2023	32	Mike Mignola, Chris Roberson	Mike Norton	Dave Stewart	Laurence Campbell	Hellboy and the B.P.R.D.: 1957 TPB; Hellboy and the B.P.R.D.: 1955–1957 HC/TPB
—	Professor Harvey is Gone	August 27, 2025; MIGNOLA VARIANT COVER: August 27, 2025	32	Mike Mignola	Giuseppe Manunta	Dave Stewart	Giuseppe Manunta; VARIANT: Mike Mignola	
—	The Ghost Ships of Labrador	PART 1: November 12, 2025; SMITH VARIANT COVER: November 12, 2025	32	Mike Mignola, Rob Williams	Laurence Campbell	Lee Loughridge	Laurence Campbell; VARIANT: Matt Smith	
—	The Ghost Ships of Labrador	PART 2: Announced for: January 7, 2026; SERRA VARIANT COVER: January 7, 2026	32	Mike Mignola, Rob Williams	Laurence Campbell	Lee Loughridge	Laurence Campbell; VARIANT: Daniele Serra	

=== Hellboy and the B.P.R.D. stories in other publications ===
Canon stories originally published in other publications, including original stories in Hellboy Universe collections. If a story was re-printed in a regular issue later, only that issue is mentioned in the column Collections; for other collections, see the entry of the regular issue.

Story title	Publication	Issue	Published	Format	Pages	Pages (story)	Story	Art	Colors	Cover	ISBN	Collections
The Mirror	Free Comic Book Day 2016: Serenity		May 7, 2016	Saddle stitched	32	8	Mike Mignola	Richard Corben	Dave Stewart	Sean Cooke	—	Hellboy and the B.P.R.D.: 1954 TPB; Hellboy and the B.P.R.D.: 1952–1954 HC/TPB; Hellboy Artists Collection: Richard Corben HC
Hellboy: Return of the Lambton Worm	Playboy	Vol. 65, #3 (May/June 2018)	May 2018	SC	?	6	Mike Mignola	Ben Stenbeck	Dave Stewart	photo cover	—	Hellboy and the B.P.R.D.: The Beast of Vargu and Others TPB

=== Hellboy and the B.P.R.D. collections ===
Title	Collects	Published	Format	Pages	Cover	ISBN
1952	1952 #1–#5; Sketchbook (18 pages)	August 12, 2015	TPB	144	Mike Mignola	978-1-61655-660-0
1953	The Phantom Hand (short story from Hellboy and the B.P.R.D. #6); Rawhead and Bloody Bones (short story from Hellboy and the B.P.R.D. #7); The Witch Tree (short story from Hellboy and the B.P.R.D. #7); The Kelpie (short story from Hellboy and the B.P.R.D. #6); Wandering Souls (short story from Hellboy Winter Special); Beyond the Fences #1–#3; Sketchbook (24 pages)	August 10, 2016	TPB	152	Mike Mignola	978-1-61655-967-0
1954	Black Sun #1–#2; The Unreasoning Beast (one-shot); Ghost Moon #1–#2; The Mirror (short story from Free Comic Book Day 2016: Serenity); Sketchbook (14 pages)	January 10, 2018	TPB	144	Mike Mignola	978-1-5067-0207-0
1955	Secret Nature (one-shot); Occult Intelligence #1–#3; Burning Season (one-shot); Sketchbook (22 pages)	June 6, 2018	TPB	144	Paolo Rivera	978-1-5067-0531-6
1956	1956 #1–#5; Hellboy vs. Lobster Johnson: The Ring of Death (one-shot); Down Mexico Way (short story from Hellboy vs. Lobster Johnson: The Ring of Death); Sketchbook (18 pages)	September 4, 2019	TPB	168	Adam Hughes	978-1-5067-1105-8
The Beast of Vargu and Others	The Beast of Vargu (one-shot); The Secret God of the Roma (short story from Hellboy and the B.P.R.D.: The Beast of Vargu); Saturn Returns #1–#3; Krampusnacht (one-shot); Return of the Lambton Worm (short story from Playboy May/June 2018; Sketchbook (30 pages)	June 24, 2020	TPB	160	Adam Hughes	978-1-5067-1130-0
The Return of Effie Kolb and Others	The Return of Effie Kolb #1–#2; Long Night at Goloski Station (one-shot); Her Fatal Hour (short story from Hellboy and the B.P.R.D.: Her Fatal Hour & The Sending); The Sending (short story from Hellboy and the B.P.R.D.: Her Fatal Hour & The Sending); The Seven Wives Club (one-shot); Sketchbook (20 pages)	November 9, 2022	TPB	152	Mike Mignola	978-1-5067-3136-0
The Secret of Chesbro House & Others	Night of the Cyclops (one-shot); The Secret of Chesbro House #1–#2; Old Man Whittier (one-shot); The Miser's Gift (short story from Hellboy Winter Special 2019); Time is a River (one-shot); Sketchbook (26 pages)	October 18, 2023	TPB	160	Mike Mignola	978-1-5067-3517-7
1957	Family Ties (one-shot); Forgotten Lives (one-shot); Falling Sky (one-shot); Fearful Symmetry (one-shot); From Below (one-shot); Happy New Year, Ava Galluci (short story from Hellboy Winter Special 2018); Sketchbook (12 pages)	December 20, 2023	TPB	152	Mike Mignola	978-1-5067-2845-2

=== Hellboy and the B.P.R.D. omnibus editions ===
Omnibus editions collecting multiple trade paperbacks.

Title	Collects	Published	Format	Pages	Cover	ISBN
Hellboy and the B.P.R.D.: 1952–1954	Introduction by Mike Mignola; 1952 TPB; 1953 TPB; 1954 TPB; Afterword by Chris Roberson; Extended sketchbook	June 9, 2021	HC	440	Mike Mignola	978-1-5067-2526-0
Hellboy and the B.P.R.D.: 1952–1954	Introduction by Mike Mignola; 1952 TPB; 1953 TPB; 1954 TPB; Afterword by Chris Roberson; Extended sketchbook	October 1, 2024	TPB	440	Mike Mignola	978-1-5067-4469-8
Hellboy and the B.P.R.D.: 1955–1957	1955 TPB; 1956 TPB; 1957 TPB	December 3, 2024	HC	456	Mike Mignola	978-1-5067-4456-8
Hellboy and the B.P.R.D.: 1955–1957	1955 TPB; 1956 TPB; 1957 TPB	Announced for: July 14, 2026	TPB	456	Mike Mignola	978-1-5067-5484-0

== Abe Sapien ==
=== Abe Sapien issues ===
Abe Sapien has an internal numbering on the inside cover from its second issue onwards. When the series became an ongoing series in 2013, an ongoing numbering was present on the cover, which reset back 1. However, the internal numbering is still present on the inside cover.

Issue	Title	Published	Pages	Story	Art	Colors	Cover	Collections
—	Drums of the Dead	March 4, 1998	32	Drums of the Dead			Mike Mignola	B.P.R.D. Volume 1: Hollow Earth & Other Stories TPB; B.P.R.D.: Plague of Frogs Volume 1 HC/TPB; B.P.R.D. Omnibus Volume 1 TPB
—	Drums of the Dead	March 4, 1998	32	Brian McDonald	Derek Thompson	James Sinclair	Mike Mignola	B.P.R.D. Volume 1: Hollow Earth & Other Stories TPB; B.P.R.D.: Plague of Frogs Volume 1 HC/TPB; B.P.R.D. Omnibus Volume 1 TPB
—	Drums of the Dead	March 4, 1998	32	Hellboy: Heads			Mike Mignola	Hellboy Volume 4: The Right Hand of Doom TPB; Hellboy Library Edition Volume 1 HC; Hellboy: The Complete Short Stories Volume 2 TPB
—	Drums of the Dead	March 4, 1998	32	Mike Mignola	Mike Mignola	Dave Stewart	Mike Mignola	Hellboy Volume 4: The Right Hand of Doom TPB; Hellboy Library Edition Volume 1 HC; Hellboy: The Complete Short Stories Volume 2 TPB
#1	The Drowning	PART 1: February 6, 2008	32	Mike Mignola	Jason Shawn Alexander	Dave Stewart	Mike Mignola	Abe Sapien Volume 1: The Drowning TPB; Abe Sapien: The Drowning and Other Stories HC/TPB
#2	The Drowning	PART 2: March 12, 2008	32	Mike Mignola	Jason Shawn Alexander	Dave Stewart	Mike Mignola	Abe Sapien Volume 1: The Drowning TPB; Abe Sapien: The Drowning and Other Stories HC/TPB
#3	The Drowning	PART 3: April 2, 2008	32	Mike Mignola	Jason Shawn Alexander	Dave Stewart	Mike Mignola	Abe Sapien Volume 1: The Drowning TPB; Abe Sapien: The Drowning and Other Stories HC/TPB
#4	The Drowning	PART 4: May 7, 2008	32	Mike Mignola	Jason Shawn Alexander	Dave Stewart	Mike Mignola	Abe Sapien Volume 1: The Drowning TPB; Abe Sapien: The Drowning and Other Stories HC/TPB
#5	The Drowning	PART 5: June 4, 2008	32	Mike Mignola	Jason Shawn Alexander	Dave Stewart	Mike Mignola	Abe Sapien Volume 1: The Drowning TPB; Abe Sapien: The Drowning and Other Stories HC/TPB
#6	The Haunted Boy	October 28, 2009	40	Mike Mignola, John Arcudi	Patric Reynolds	Dave Stewart	Dave Johnson	Abe Sapien Volume 2: The Devil Does Not Jest and Other Stories TPB; Abe Sapien: The Drowning and Other Stories HC/TPB
#7	The Abyssal Plain	PART 1: June 30, 2010; SNEJBERG VARIANT COVER: June 30, 2010	32	Mike Mignola, John Arcudi	Peter Snejbjerg	Dave Stewart	Dave Johnson; VARIANT: Peter Snejbjerg	Abe Sapien Volume 2: The Devil Does Not Jest and Other Stories TPB; Abe Sapien: The Drowning and Other Stories HC/TPB
#8	The Abyssal Plain	PART 2: July 28, 2010	32	Mike Mignola, John Arcudi	Peter Snejbjerg	Dave Stewart	Dave Johnson	Abe Sapien Volume 2: The Devil Does Not Jest and Other Stories TPB; Abe Sapien: The Drowning and Other Stories HC/TPB
#9	The Devil Does Not Jest	PART 1: September 28, 2011; FRANCAVILLA VARIANT COVER: September 28, 2011	32	Mike Mignola, John Arcudi	James Harren	Dave Stewart	Dave Johnson; VARIANT: Francesco Francavilla	Abe Sapien Volume 2: The Devil Does Not Jest and Other Stories TPB; Abe Sapien: The Drowning and Other Stories HC/TPB
#10	The Devil Does Not Jest	PART 2: October 26, 2011	32	Mike Mignola, John Arcudi	James Harren	Dave Stewart	Dave Johnson	Abe Sapien Volume 2: The Devil Does Not Jest and Other Stories TPB; Abe Sapien: The Drowning and Other Stories HC/TPB
#11	ABE SAPIEN #1–#3; Dark and Terrible	PART 1: April 3, 2013; M. FIUMARA VARIANT COVER: April 3, 2013 "#1 FOR $1": November 27, 2013	32	Mike Mignola, Scott Allie	Sebastián Fiumara	Dave Stewart	Sebastián Fiumara; VARIANT: Max Fiumara "#1 FOR $1": Mike Mignola	Abe Sapien Volume 3: Dark and Terrible and The New Race of Man TPB; Abe Sapien: Dark and Terrible Volume 1 HC/TPB
#12	ABE SAPIEN #1–#3; Dark and Terrible	PART 2: May 1, 2013	32	Mike Mignola, Scott Allie	Sebastián Fiumara	Dave Stewart	Sebastián Fiumara	Abe Sapien Volume 3: Dark and Terrible and The New Race of Man TPB; Abe Sapien: Dark and Terrible Volume 1 HC/TPB
#13	ABE SAPIEN #1–#3; Dark and Terrible	PART 3: June 5, 2013	32	Mike Mignola, Scott Allie	Sebastián Fiumara	Dave Stewart	Sebastián Fiumara	Abe Sapien Volume 3: Dark and Terrible and The New Race of Man TPB; Abe Sapien: Dark and Terrible Volume 1 HC/TPB
#14	ABE SAPIEN #4–#5; The New Race of Man	PART 1: July 3, 2013; S. FIUMARA VARIANT COVER: July 3, 2013	32	Mike Mignola, John Arcudi	Max Fiumara	Dave Stewart	Max Fiumara; VARIANT: Sebastián Fiumara	Abe Sapien Volume 3: Dark and Terrible and The New Race of Man TPB; Abe Sapien: Dark and Terrible Volume 1 HC/TPB
#15	ABE SAPIEN #4–#5; The New Race of Man	PART 2: August 7, 2013	32	Mike Mignola, John Arcudi	Max Fiumara	Dave Stewart	Max Fiumara	Abe Sapien Volume 3: Dark and Terrible and The New Race of Man TPB; Abe Sapien: Dark and Terrible Volume 1 HC/TPB
#16	ABE SAPIEN #6–#7; The Shape of Things to Come	PART 1: October 9, 2013	32	Mike Mignola, Scott Allie	Sebastián Fiumara	Dave Stewart	Max Fiumara	Abe Sapien Volume 4: The Shape of Things to Come TPB; Abe Sapien: Dark and Terrible Volume 1 HC/TPB
#17	ABE SAPIEN #6–#7; The Shape of Things to Come	PART 2: November 13, 2013	32	Mike Mignola, Scott Allie	PENCILS: Sebastián Fiumara; INKS: Max Fiumara	Dave Stewart	Max Fiumara	Abe Sapien Volume 4: The Shape of Things to Come TPB; Abe Sapien: Dark and Terrible Volume 1 HC/TPB
#18	ABE SAPIEN #8; The Land of the Dead	December 11, 2013; OEMING VARIANT COVER: December 11, 2013	32	Mike Mignola, Scott Allie	Michael Avon Oeming	Dave Stewart	Sebastián Fiumara; VARIANT: Michael Avon Oeming	Abe Sapien Volume 9: Lost Lives and Other Stories TPB; Abe Sapien: The Drowning and Other Stories HC/TPB
#19	ABE SAPIEN #9–#11; To the Last Man	PART 1: January 8, 2014; MIGNOLA VARIANT COVER: January 8, 2014	32	Mike Mignola, Scott Allie	Max Fiumara	Dave Stewart	Max Fiumara; VARIANT: Mike Mignola	Abe Sapien Volume 4: The Shape of Things to Come TPB; Abe Sapien: Dark and Terrible Volume 1 HC/TPB
#20	ABE SAPIEN #9–#11; To the Last Man	PART 2: February 12, 2014	32	Mike Mignola, Scott Allie	Max Fiumara	Dave Stewart	Max Fiumara	Abe Sapien Volume 4: The Shape of Things to Come TPB; Abe Sapien: Dark and Terrible Volume 1 HC/TPB
#21	ABE SAPIEN #9–#11; To the Last Man	PART 3: March 12, 2014	32	Mike Mignola, Scott Allie	Max Fiumara	Dave Stewart	Max Fiumara	Abe Sapien Volume 4: The Shape of Things to Come TPB; Abe Sapien: Dark and Terrible Volume 1 HC/TPB
#22	ABE SAPIEN #12; The Garden (I)	May 14, 2014	32	Mike Mignola, Scott Allie	Max Fiumara	Dave Stewart	Sebastián Fiumara	Abe Sapien Volume 5: Sacred Places TPB; Abe Sapien: Dark and Terrible Volume 1 HC/TPB
#23	ABE SAPIEN #13; The Healer	June 11, 2014	32	Mike Mignola, Scott Allie	Sebastián Fiumara	Dave Stewart	Sebastián Fiumara	Abe Sapien Volume 5: Sacred Places TPB; Abe Sapien: Dark and Terrible Volume 1 HC/TPB
#24	ABE SAPIEN #14; Visions, Dreams, and Fishin'	July 9, 2014	32	Mike Mignola, Scott Allie	Max Fiumara	Dave Stewart	Sebastián Fiumara	Abe Sapien Volume 5: Sacred Places TPB; Abe Sapien: Dark and Terrible Volume 1 HC/TPB
#25	ABE SAPIEN #15; Lost Lives	August 13, 2014	32	Mike Mignola, Scott Allie	Juan Ferreyra	Juan Ferreyra, Eduardo Ferreyra	Sebastián Fiumara	Abe Sapien Volume 9: Lost Lives and Other Stories TPB; Abe Sapien: The Drowning and Other Stories HC/TPB
#26	ABE SAPIEN #16–#17; Sacred Places	PART 1: September 10, 2014	32	Mike Mignola, Scott Allie	Sebastián Fiumara	Dave Stewart	Sebastián Fiumara	Abe Sapien Volume 5: Sacred Places TPB; Abe Sapien: Dark and Terrible Volume 1 HC/TPB
#27	ABE SAPIEN #16–#17; Sacred Places	PART 2: October 8, 2014	32	Mike Mignola, Scott Allie	Sebastián Fiumara	Dave Stewart	Sebastián Fiumara	Abe Sapien Volume 5: Sacred Places TPB; Abe Sapien: Dark and Terrible Volume 1 HC/TPB
#28	ABE SAPIEN #18–#22; A Darkness so Great	PART 1: Grace; December 10, 2014	32	Mike Mignola, Scott Allie	Max Fiumara; PAGE 1: Robert Sikoryak	Dave Stewart	Max Fiumara	Abe Sapien Volume 6: A Darkness so Great TPB; Abe Sapien: Dark and Terrible Volume 2 HC/TPB
#29	ABE SAPIEN #18–#22; A Darkness so Great	PART 2: Dayana; January 14, 2015	32	Mike Mignola, Scott Allie	Sebastián Fiumara	Dave Stewart	Max Fiumara	Abe Sapien Volume 6: A Darkness so Great TPB; Abe Sapien: Dark and Terrible Volume 2 HC/TPB
#30	ABE SAPIEN #18–#22; A Darkness so Great	PART 3: Megan; February 11, 2015	32	Mike Mignola, Scott Allie	Max Fiumara	Dave Stewart	Max Fiumara	Abe Sapien Volume 6: A Darkness so Great TPB; Abe Sapien: Dark and Terrible Volume 2 HC/TPB
#31	ABE SAPIEN #18–#22; A Darkness so Great	PART 4: Arbogast; March 11, 2015	32	Mike Mignola, Scott Allie	Sebastián Fiumara	Dave Stewart	Max Fiumara	Abe Sapien Volume 6: A Darkness so Great TPB; Abe Sapien: Dark and Terrible Volume 2 HC/TPB
#32	ABE SAPIEN #18–#22; A Darkness so Great	PART 5: Abe; April 8, 2015	32	Mike Mignola, Scott Allie	Max Fiumara	Dave Stewart	Max Fiumara	Abe Sapien Volume 6: A Darkness so Great TPB; Abe Sapien: Dark and Terrible Volume 2 HC/TPB
#33	ABE SAPIEN #23; The Ogopogo	May 13, 2015	32	Mike Mignola, Scott Allie	Kevin Nowlan	Kevin Nowlan	Kevin Nowlan	Abe Sapien Volume 9: Lost Lives and Other Stories TPB; Abe Sapien: The Drowning and Other Stories HC/TPB
#34	ABE SAPIEN #24–#26; The Shadow Over Suwanee	PART 1: July 22, 2015	32	Mike Mignola, Scott Allie	PENCILS: Sebastián Fiumara; INKS: Sebastián Fiumara, Max Fiumara	Dave Stewart	Max Fiumara	Abe Sapien Volume 7: The Secret Fire TPB; Abe Sapien: Dark and Terrible Volume 2 HC/TPB
#35	ABE SAPIEN #24–#26; The Shadow Over Suwanee	PART 2: August 12, 2015	32	Mike Mignola, Scott Allie	PENCILS: Sebastián Fiumara; INKS: Max Fiumara; PENCILS & INKS; PAGES 4–19: Tyler Crook	Dave Stewart	Max Fiumara	Abe Sapien Volume 7: The Secret Fire TPB; Abe Sapien: Dark and Terrible Volume 2 HC/TPB
#36	ABE SAPIEN #24–#26; The Shadow Over Suwanee	PART 3: September 9, 2015	32	Mike Mignola, Scott Allie	PENCILS : Sebastián Fiumara; PENCILS PAGES 4–9: Max Fiumara; INKS: Sebastián Fiumara, Max Fiumara	Dave Stewart	Max Fiumara	Abe Sapien Volume 7: The Secret Fire TPB; Abe Sapien: Dark and Terrible Volume 2 HC/TPB
#37	ABE SAPIEN #27; Icthyo Sapien	October 14, 2015	32	Mike Mignola, Scott Allie	Alise Gluškova	Alise Gluškova	Mike Mignola	Abe Sapien Volume 9: Lost Lives and Other Stories TPB; Abe Sapien: The Drowning and Other Stories HC/TPB
#38	ABE SAPIEN #28–#29; The Garden (II)	PART 1: November 11, 2015	32	Mike Mignola, Scott Allie	Max Fiumara	Dave Stewart	Max Fiumara	Abe Sapien Volume 7: The Secret Fire TPB; Abe Sapien: Dark and Terrible Volume 2 HC/TPB
#39	ABE SAPIEN #28–#29; The Garden (II)	PART 2: December 9, 2015	32	Mike Mignola, Scott Allie	Max Fiumara	Dave Stewart	Max Fiumara	Abe Sapien Volume 7: The Secret Fire TPB; Abe Sapien: Dark and Terrible Volume 2 HC/TPB
#40	ABE SAPIEN #30; Witchcraft & Demonology	January 13, 2016	32	Mike Mignola, Scott Allie	Santiago Caruso	Dave Stewart	Max Fiumara	Abe Sapien Volume 9: Lost Lives and Other Stories TPB; Abe Sapien: The Drowning and Other Stories HC/TPB
#41	ABE SAPIEN #31; The Black School	February 10, 2016 MACK VARIANT COVER: February 10, 2016	32	Mike Mignola, Scott Allie	Sebastián Fiumara	Dave Stewart	Max Fiumara; VARIANT: David Mack	Abe Sapien Volume 7: The Secret Fire TPB; Abe Sapien: Dark and Terrible Volume 2 HC/TPB
#42	ABE SAPIEN #32–#33; Regressions	PART 1: April 13, 2016	32	Mike Mignola, Scott Allie	Max Fiumara	Dave Stewart	Sebastián Fiumara	Abe Sapien Volume 8: The Desolate Shore TPB; Abe Sapien: Dark and Terrible Volume 2 HC/TPB
#43	ABE SAPIEN #32–#33; Regressions	PART 2: May 11, 2016	32	Mike Mignola, Scott Allie	Max Fiumara	Dave Stewart	Sebastián Fiumara	Abe Sapien Volume 8: The Desolate Shore TPB; Abe Sapien: Dark and Terrible Volume 2 HC/TPB
#44	ABE SAPIEN #34; Dark and Terrible Deep	June 8, 2016	32	Mike Mignola, Scott Allie	Sebastián Fiumara	Dave Stewart	Sebastián Fiumara	Abe Sapien Volume 8: The Desolate Shore TPB; Abe Sapien: Dark and Terrible Volume 2 HC/TPB
#45	ABE SAPIEN #35; The Garden (III)	July 13, 2016	32	Mike Mignola, Scott Allie	Max Fiumara	Dave Stewart	Sebastián Fiumara	Abe Sapien Volume 8: The Desolate Shore TPB; Abe Sapien: Dark and Terrible Volume 2 HC/TPB
#46	ABE SAPIEN #36; The Desolate Shore	August 10, 2016	32	Mike Mignola, Scott Allie	Sebastián Fiumara	Dave Stewart	Sebastián Fiumara	Abe Sapien Volume 8: The Desolate Shore TPB; Abe Sapien: Dark and Terrible Volume 2 HC/TPB

=== Abe Sapien stories in other publications ===
Canon stories originally published in other publications, including original stories in Hellboy Universe collections. If a story was re-printed in a regular issue later, only that issue is mentioned in the column Collections; for other collections, see the entry of the regular issue.

Story title	Publication	Issue	Published	Format	Pages	Pages (story)	Story	Art	Colors	Cover	ISBN	Collections
The Calm Before the Storm	multiversitycomics.com	—	January 15, 2015	Digital	5	5	Alise Gluškova, Scott Allie	Alise Gluškova	Alise Gluškova	—	—	Abe Sapien: The Drowning and Other Stories HC/TPB
Subconscious	Dark Horse Presents; Volume 3	#11	June 17, 2015	Saddle stitched	48	8	John Arcudi	Mark Nelson	Mark Nelson	Mark Nelson	—	Abe Sapien Volume 9: Lost Lives and Other Stories TPB; Abe Sapien: The Drowning and Other Stories HC/TPB

=== Abe Sapien collections ===
Volume	Title	Collects	Published	Format	Pages	Cover	ISBN
1	The Drowning	The Drowning #1–#5; Sketchbook ( pages)	September 17, 2008	TPB	144	Mike Mignola	978-1-59582-185-0
2	The Devil Does Not Jest and Other Stories	The Haunted Boy (one-shot); The Abyssal Plain #1–#2; The Devil Does Not Jest #1–#2; Sketchbook (20 pages)	April 18, 2012	TPB	144	Mike Mignola	978-1-59582-925-2
3	Dark and Terrible and The New Race of Man	Dark and Terrible #1–#3; The New Race of Man #1–#2; Sketchbook (24 pages)	December 11, 2013	TPB	144	Mike Mignola	978-1-61655-284-8
4	The Shape of Things to Come	The Shape of Things to Come #1–#2; To the Last Man #1–#3; Sketchbook (18 pages)	July 9, 2014	TPB	144	Mike Mignola	978-1-61655-443-9
5	Sacred Places	The Garden (I) (one-shot); The Healer (one-shot); Visions, Dreams, and Fishin' (one-shot); Sacred Places #1–#2; Sketchbook (20 pages)	January 21, 2015	TPB	144	Max Fiumara; Sebastián Fiumara	978-1-61655-515-3
6	A Darkness So Great	A Darkness so Great #1–#5; Sketchbook (18 pages)	July 15, 2015	TPB	144	Max Fiumara; Sebastián Fiumara	978-1-61655-656-3
7	The Secret Fire	The Shadow Over Suwanee #1–#3; The Garden (II) #1–#2; The Black School (one-shot); Sketchbook (18 pages)	June 15, 2016	TPB	160	Max Fiumara; Sebastián Fiumara	978-1-61655-891-8
8	The Desolate Shore	Regressions #1–#2; Dark and Terrible Deep (one-shot); The Garden (III) (one-shot); The Desolate Shore (one-shot); Afterword by Scott Allie; Sketchbook (19 pages)	January 18, 2017	TPB	144	Sebastián Fiumara	978-1-5067-0031-1
9	Lost Lives and Other Stories	The Land of the Dead (one-shot); Witchcraft & Demonology (one-shot); The Ogopogo (one-shot); Subconscious (from Dark Horse Presents Volume 3 #11); Lost Lives (one-shot); Icthyo Sapien (one-shot); Sketchbook (14 pages)	June 7, 2017	TPB	152	Sebastián Fiumara	978-1-5067-0220-9

=== Abe Sapien omnibus editions ===
Omnibus editions collecting multiple trade paperbacks.

Title	Collects	Published	Format	Pages	Cover	ISBN	Notes
Abe Sapien: Dark and Terrible Volume 1	Introduction by Scott Allie; Dark and Terrible and The New Race of Man TPB; The Shape of Things to Come TPB; Sacred Places TPB; Extended sketchbook	November 15, 2017	HC	408	Sebastián Fiumara	978-1-5067-0538-5	
Abe Sapien: Dark and Terrible Volume 1	Introduction by Scott Allie; Dark and Terrible and The New Race of Man TPB; The Shape of Things to Come TPB; Sacred Places TPB; Extended sketchbook	November 16, 2022	TPB	440	Sebastián Fiumara	978-1-5067-3378-4	
Abe Sapien: Dark and Terrible Volume 2	Introduction by Scott Allie; A Darkness so Great TPB; The Secret Fire TPB; The Desolate Shore TPB; Extended sketchbook	March 21, 2018	HC	408	Sebastián Fiumara	978-1-5067-0385-5	
Abe Sapien: Dark and Terrible Volume 2	Introduction by Scott Allie; A Darkness so Great TPB; The Secret Fire TPB; The Desolate Shore TPB; Extended sketchbook	April 12, 2023	TPB	456	Sebastián Fiumara	978-1-5067-3379-1	
Abe Sapien: The Drowning and Other Stories	Introduction by Scott Allie; The Drowning TPB; The Devil Does Not Jest and Other Stories TPB; Lost Lives and Other Stories TPB; Icthyo Sapien epilogue (2 new pages); B.P.R.D.: Casualties (short story from Dark Horse Digital); The Calm Before the Storm (short story from Multiversity Comics); Extended sketchbook	July 11, 2018	HC	448	Sebastián Fiumara	978-1-5067-0488-3	Story order was re-arranged
Abe Sapien: The Drowning and Other Stories	Introduction by Scott Allie; The Drowning TPB; The Devil Does Not Jest and Other Stories TPB; Lost Lives and Other Stories TPB; Icthyo Sapien epilogue (2 new pages); B.P.R.D.: Casualties (short story from Dark Horse Digital); The Calm Before the Storm (short story from Multiversity Comics); Extended sketchbook	August 2, 2023	TPB	448	Sebastián Fiumara	978-1-5067-3380-7	Story order was re-arranged

== Lobster Johnson ==
=== Lobster Johnson issues ===
Lobster Johnson has an internal numbering on the inside cover of its issues.

Issue	Title	Published	Pages	Story	Art	Colors	Cover	Collections
#1	The Iron Prometheus	PART 1: September 5, 2007	32	Mike Mignola	Jason Armstrong	Dave Stewart	Mike Mignola	Lobster Johnson Volume 1: The Iron Prometheus TPB; Lobster Johnson Omnibus Volume 2 HC
#2	The Iron Prometheus	PART 2: October 3, 2007	32	Mike Mignola	Jason Armstrong	Dave Stewart	Mike Mignola	Lobster Johnson Volume 1: The Iron Prometheus TPB; Lobster Johnson Omnibus Volume 2 HC
#3	The Iron Prometheus	PART 3: November 7, 2007	32	Mike Mignola	Jason Armstrong	Dave Stewart	Mike Mignola	Lobster Johnson Volume 1: The Iron Prometheus TPB; Lobster Johnson Omnibus Volume 2 HC
#4	The Iron Prometheus	PART 4: December 5, 2007	32	Mike Mignola	Jason Armstrong	Dave Stewart	Mike Mignola	Lobster Johnson Volume 1: The Iron Prometheus TPB; Lobster Johnson Omnibus Volume 2 HC
#5	The Iron Prometheus	PART 5: January 2, 2008	32	Mike Mignola	Jason Armstrong	Dave Stewart	Mike Mignola	Lobster Johnson Volume 1: The Iron Prometheus TPB; Lobster Johnson Omnibus Volume 2 HC
#6	The Burning Hand	PART 1: January 11, 2012; MIGNOLA VARIANT COVER: January 11, 2012	32	Mike Mignola, John Arcudi	Tonci Zonjic	Dave Stewart	Dave Johnson; VARIANT: Mike Mignola	Lobster Johnson Volume 2: The Burning Hand TPB; Lobster Johnson Omnibus Volume 1 HC; Hellboy Universe Essentials: Lobster Johnson TPB
#7	The Burning Hand	PART 2: February 8, 2012	32	Mike Mignola, John Arcudi	Tonci Zonjic	Dave Stewart	Dave Johnson	Lobster Johnson Volume 2: The Burning Hand TPB; Lobster Johnson Omnibus Volume 1 HC; Hellboy Universe Essentials: Lobster Johnson TPB
#8	The Burning Hand	PART 3: March 14, 2012	32	Mike Mignola, John Arcudi	Tonci Zonjic	Dave Stewart	Dave Johnson	Lobster Johnson Volume 2: The Burning Hand TPB; Lobster Johnson Omnibus Volume 1 HC; Hellboy Universe Essentials: Lobster Johnson TPB
#9	The Burning Hand	PART 4: April 11, 2012; MIGNOLA VARIANT COVER: April 11, 2012	32	Mike Mignola, John Arcudi	Tonci Zonjic	Dave Stewart	Dave Johnson; VARIANT: Mike Mignola	Lobster Johnson Volume 2: The Burning Hand TPB; Lobster Johnson Omnibus Volume 1 HC; Hellboy Universe Essentials: Lobster Johnson TPB
#10	The Burning Hand	PART : May 9, 2012	32	Mike Mignola, John Arcudi	Tonci Zonjic	Dave Stewart	Dave Johnson	Lobster Johnson Volume 2: The Burning Hand TPB; Lobster Johnson Omnibus Volume 1 HC; Hellboy Universe Essentials: Lobster Johnson TPB
#11	The Prayer of Neferu	August 22, 2012	32	Mike Mignola, John Arcudi	Wilfredo Torres	Dave Stewart	Tonci Zonjic	Lobster Johnson Volume 3: Satan Smells a Rat TPB; Lobster Johnson Omnibus Volume 1 HC
#12	Caput Mortuum	September 19, 2012; MIGNOLA VARIANT COVER: September 19, 2012	32	Mike Mignola, John Arcudi	Tonci Zonjic	Dave Stewart	Tonci Zonjic; VARIANT: Mike Mignola	Lobster Johnson Volume 3: Satan Smells a Rat TPB; Lobster Johnson Omnibus Volume 1 HC
#13	Satan Smells a Rat	May 22, 2013	32	Mike Mignola, John Arcudi	Kevin Nowlan			Lobster Johnson Volume 3: Satan Smells a Rat TPB; Lobster Johnson Omnibus Volume 1 HC
#14	A Scent of Lotus	PART 1: July 24, 2013	32	Mike Mignola, John Arcudi	Sebastián Fiumara	Dave Stewart	Tonci Zonjic	Lobster Johnson Volume 3: Satan Smells a Rat TPB; Lobster Johnson Omnibus Volume 1 HC
#15	A Scent of Lotus	PART 2: August 21, 2013	32	Mike Mignola, John Arcudi	Sebastián Fiumara	Dave Stewart	Tonci Zonjic	Lobster Johnson Volume 3: Satan Smells a Rat TPB; Lobster Johnson Omnibus Volume 1 HC
#16	Get the Lobster	PART 1: February 5, 2014	32	Mike Mignola, John Arcudi	Tonci Zonjic	Dave Stewart	Tonci Zonjic	Lobster Johnson Volume 4: Get the Lobster TPB; Lobster Johnson Omnibus Volume 1 HC
#17	Get the Lobster	PART 2: March 5, 2014	32	Mike Mignola, John Arcudi	Tonci Zonjic	Dave Stewart	Tonci Zonjic	Lobster Johnson Volume 4: Get the Lobster TPB; Lobster Johnson Omnibus Volume 1 HC
#18	Get the Lobster	PART 3: April 2, 2014	32	Mike Mignola, John Arcudi	Tonci Zonjic	Dave Stewart	Tonci Zonjic	Lobster Johnson Volume 4: Get the Lobster TPB; Lobster Johnson Omnibus Volume 1 HC
#19	Get the Lobster	PART 4: June 4, 2014	32	Mike Mignola, John Arcudi	Tonci Zonjic	Dave Stewart	Tonci Zonjic	Lobster Johnson Volume 4: Get the Lobster TPB; Lobster Johnson Omnibus Volume 1 HC
#20	Get the Lobster	PART 5: August 13, 2014	32	Mike Mignola, John Arcudi	Tonci Zonjic	Dave Stewart	Tonci Zonjic	Lobster Johnson Volume 4: Get the Lobster TPB; Lobster Johnson Omnibus Volume 1 HC
#21	A Chain Forged in Life	July 29, 2015	32	Mike Mignola, John Arcudi	Troy Nixey	Dave Stewart	Tonci Zonjic	Lobster Johnson Volume 6: A Chain Forged in Life TPB; Lobster Johnson Omnibus Volume 2 HC
#21	A Chain Forged in Life	July 29, 2015	32	Mike Mignola, John Arcudi	PAGES 1, 22: Kevin Nowlan		Tonci Zonjic	Lobster Johnson Volume 6: A Chain Forged in Life TPB; Lobster Johnson Omnibus Volume 2 HC
#22	The Glass Mantis	December 30, 2015	32	Mike Mignola, John Arcudi	Toni Fejzula	Dave Stewart	Tonci Zonjic	Lobster Johnson Volume 6: A Chain Forged in Life TPB; Lobster Johnson Omnibus Volume 2 HC
#23	The Forgotten Man	April 6, 2016	32	Mike Mignola, John Arcudi	Peter Snejbjerg	Dave Stewart	Tonci Zonjic	Lobster Johnson Volume 6: A Chain Forged in Life TPB; Lobster Johnson Omnibus Volume 2 HC
#24	Metal Monsters of Midtown	PART 1: May 25, 2016	32	Mike Mignola, John Arcudi	Tonci Zonjic	Dave Stewart	Tonci Zonjic	Lobster Johnson Volume 5: The Pirate's Ghost and Metal Monsters of Midtown TPB; Lobster Johnson Omnibus Volume 2 HC
#25	Metal Monsters of Midtown	PART 2: June 29, 2016	32	Mike Mignola, John Arcudi	Tonci Zonjic	Dave Stewart	Tonci Zonjic	Lobster Johnson Volume 5: The Pirate's Ghost and Metal Monsters of Midtown TPB; Lobster Johnson Omnibus Volume 2 HC
#26	Metal Monsters of Midtown	PART 3: July 27, 2016	32	Mike Mignola, John Arcudi	Tonci Zonjic	Dave Stewart	Tonci Zonjic	Lobster Johnson Volume 5: The Pirate's Ghost and Metal Monsters of Midtown TPB; Lobster Johnson Omnibus Volume 2 HC
#27	Garden of Bones	January 11, 2017	32	Mike Mignola, John Arcudi	Stephen Green	Dave Stewart	Tonci Zonjic	Lobster Johnson Volume 6: A Chain Forged in Life TPB; Lobster Johnson Omnibus Volume 2 HC
#28	The Pirate's Ghost	PART 1: March 29, 2017	32	Mike Mignola, John Arcudi	Tonci Zonjic			Lobster Johnson Volume 5: The Pirate's Ghost and Metal Monsters of Midtown TPB; Lobster Johnson Omnibus Volume 2 HC
#29	The Pirate's Ghost	PART 2: April 26, 2017	32	Mike Mignola, John Arcudi	Tonci Zonjic			Lobster Johnson Volume 5: The Pirate's Ghost and Metal Monsters of Midtown TPB; Lobster Johnson Omnibus Volume 2 HC
#30	The Pirate's Ghost	PART 3: May 31, 2017	32	Mike Mignola, John Arcudi	Tonci Zonjic			Lobster Johnson Volume 5: The Pirate's Ghost and Metal Monsters of Midtown TPB; Lobster Johnson Omnibus Volume 2 HC
#31	Mangekyō	August 2, 2017	32	Mike Mignola, John Arcudi	Ben Stenbeck	Dave Stewart	Tonci Zonjic	Lobster Johnson Volume 6: A Chain Forged in Life TPB; Lobster Johnson Omnibus Volume 2 HC

=== Lobster Johnson stories in other publications ===
Canon stories originally published in other publications, including original stories in Hellboy Universe collections. If a story was re-printed in a regular issue later, only that issue is mentioned in the column Collections; for other collections, see the entry of the regular issue.

Story title	Publication	Issue	Published	Format	Pages	Pages story)	Story	Art	Colors	Cover	ISBN	Collections
Tony Masso's Finest Hour	Dark Horse Presents; Volume 2	#9	February 22, 2012; YEATES VARIANT COVER: February 22, 2012	Square bound	80	8	Mike Mignola	Joe Querio	Dave Stewart	Mike Mignola; VARIANT: Thomas Yeates	—	Lobster Johnson Volume 3: Satan Smells a Rat TPB; Lobster Johnson Omnibus Volume 1 HC

=== Lobster Johnson collections ===
Volume	Title	Collects	Published	Format	Pages	Cover	ISBN	Notes
1	The Iron Prometheus	The Iron Prometheus #1–#5; Sketchbook (17 pages)	June 18, 2008	TPB	140	Mike Mignola	978-1-59307-975-8	
2	The Burning Hand	The Burning Hand #1–#5; Sketchbook (18 pages)	November 14, 2012	TPB	144	Mike Mignola	978-1-61655-031-8	
3	Satan Smells a Rat	Caput Mortuum (one-shot); Satan Smells a Rat (one-shot); A Scent of Lotus #1–#2; Tony Masso's Finest Hour (short story from Dark Horse Presents Volume 2 #9); The Prayer of Neferu (one-shot); Sketchbook (18 pages)	February 12, 2014	TPB	144	Mike Mignola	978-1-61655-203-9	
4	Get the Lobster	Get the Lobster #1–#5; Sketchbook (18 pages)	December 17, 2014	TPB	144	Tonci Zonjic	978-1-61655-199-5	
5	The Pirate's Ghost and Metal Monsters of Midtown	Metal Monsters of Midtown #1–#3; The Pirate's Ghost #1–#3; Sketchbook (16 pages)	December 13, 2017	TPB	168	Tonci Zonjic	978-1-5067-0206-3	
6	A Chain Forged in Life	A Chain Forged in Life (one-shot); The Forgotten Man (one-shot); The Glass Mantis (one-shot); Garden of Bones (one-shot); Mangekyō (one-shot); Sketchbook (18 pages)	March 7, 2018	TPB	144	Tonci Zonjic	978-1-5067-0178-3	
—	Hellboy Universe Essentials: Lobster Johnson	Introduction by Katii O'Brien; The Burning Hand #1–#5	March 9, 2022	TPB	128	Mike Mignola	978-1-5067-2504-8	Stories already published in previous collections

=== Lobster Johnson omnibus editions ===
Omnibus editions collecting multiple trade paperbacks.

Title	Collects	Published	Format	Pages	Cover	ISBN
Lobster Johnson Omnibus Volume 1	The Empty Chair (short story from Hellboy Winter Special 2018); The Burning Hand TPB; Satan Smells a Rat TPB; Get the Lobster! TPB	March 9, 2022	HC	445	Tonci Zonjic	978-1-5067-2639-7
Lobster Johnson Omnibus Volume 2	A Chain Forged in Life TPB; The Pirate's Ghost and Metal Monsters of Midtown TPB; The Iron Prometheus TPB; The Killer in My Skull (short story from Hellboy: Box Full of Evil #1)	August 23, 2023	HC	472	Tonci Zonjic	978-1-5067-3503-0

== Sir Edward Grey, Witchfinder ==
=== Sir Edward Grey, Witchfinder issues ===
Sir Edward Grey, Witchfinder has an internal numbering on the inside cover of its issues.

Story cycle	Issue	Title	Published	Pages	Story	Art	Colors	Cover	Collections
Sir Edward Grey, Witchfinder	#1	In the Service of Angels	PART 1: July 01, 2009	32	Mike Mignola	Ben Stenbeck	Dave Stewart	Mike Mignola	Witchfinder Volume 1: In the Service of Angels TPB; Witchfinder Omnibus Volume 1 HC/TPB; Hellboy Universe Essentials: Witchfinder TPB
Sir Edward Grey, Witchfinder	#2	In the Service of Angels	PART 2: August 05, 2009	32	Mike Mignola	Ben Stenbeck	Dave Stewart	Mike Mignola	Witchfinder Volume 1: In the Service of Angels TPB; Witchfinder Omnibus Volume 1 HC/TPB; Hellboy Universe Essentials: Witchfinder TPB
Sir Edward Grey, Witchfinder	#3	In the Service of Angels	PART 3: September 02, 2009	32	Mike Mignola	Ben Stenbeck	Dave Stewart	Mike Mignola	Witchfinder Volume 1: In the Service of Angels TPB; Witchfinder Omnibus Volume 1 HC/TPB; Hellboy Universe Essentials: Witchfinder TPB
Sir Edward Grey, Witchfinder	#4	In the Service of Angels	PART 4: October 07, 2009	32	Mike Mignola	Ben Stenbeck	Dave Stewart	Mike Mignola	Witchfinder Volume 1: In the Service of Angels TPB; Witchfinder Omnibus Volume 1 HC/TPB; Hellboy Universe Essentials: Witchfinder TPB
Sir Edward Grey, Witchfinder	#5	In the Service of Angels	PART 5: November 04, 2009	32	Mike Mignola	Ben Stenbeck	Dave Stewart	Mike Mignola	Witchfinder Volume 1: In the Service of Angels TPB; Witchfinder Omnibus Volume 1 HC/TPB; Hellboy Universe Essentials: Witchfinder TPB
Sir Edward Grey, Witchfinder	#6	Lost and Gone Forever	PART 1: February 02, 2011; SEVERIN VARIANT COVER: February 02, 2011	32	Mike Mignola, John Arcudi	John Severin	Dave Stewart	Mike Mignola; VARIANT: John Severin	Witchfinder Volume 2: Lost and Gone Forever TPB; Witchfinder Omnibus Volume 1 HC/TPB
Sir Edward Grey, Witchfinder	#7	Lost and Gone Forever	PART 2: March 02, 2011	32	Mike Mignola, John Arcudi	John Severin	Dave Stewart	Mike Mignola	Witchfinder Volume 2: Lost and Gone Forever TPB; Witchfinder Omnibus Volume 1 HC/TPB
Sir Edward Grey, Witchfinder	#8	Lost and Gone Forever	PART 3: April 06, 2011	32	Mike Mignola, John Arcudi	John Severin	Dave Stewart	Mike Mignola	Witchfinder Volume 2: Lost and Gone Forever TPB; Witchfinder Omnibus Volume 1 HC/TPB
Sir Edward Grey, Witchfinder	#9	Lost and Gone Forever	PART 4: May 04, 2011	32	Mike Mignola, John Arcudi	John Severin	Dave Stewart	Mike Mignola	Witchfinder Volume 2: Lost and Gone Forever TPB; Witchfinder Omnibus Volume 1 HC/TPB
Sir Edward Grey, Witchfinder	#10	Lost and Gone Forever	PART 5: June 01, 2011	32	Mike Mignola, John Arcudi	John Severin	Dave Stewart	Mike Mignola	Witchfinder Volume 2: Lost and Gone Forever TPB; Witchfinder Omnibus Volume 1 HC/TPB
Sir Edward Grey, Witchfinder	#11	The Mysteries of Unland	PART 1: June 18, 2014	32	Kim Newman, Maura McHugh	Tyler Crook	Dave Stewart	Julián Totino Tedesco	Witchfinder Volume 3: The Mysteries of Unland TPB; Witchfinder Omnibus Volume 1 HC/TPB
Sir Edward Grey, Witchfinder	#12	The Mysteries of Unland	PART 2: July 16, 2014	32	Kim Newman, Maura McHugh	Tyler Crook	Dave Stewart	Julián Totino Tedesco	Witchfinder Volume 3: The Mysteries of Unland TPB; Witchfinder Omnibus Volume 1 HC/TPB
Sir Edward Grey, Witchfinder	#13	The Mysteries of Unland	PART 3: August 20, 2014	32	Kim Newman, Maura McHugh	Tyler Crook	Dave Stewart	Julián Totino Tedesco	Witchfinder Volume 3: The Mysteries of Unland TPB; Witchfinder Omnibus Volume 1 HC/TPB
Sir Edward Grey, Witchfinder	#14	The Mysteries of Unland	PART 4: September 17, 2014	32	Kim Newman, Maura McHugh	Tyler Crook	Dave Stewart	Julián Totino Tedesco	Witchfinder Volume 3: The Mysteries of Unland TPB; Witchfinder Omnibus Volume 1 HC/TPB
Sir Edward Grey, Witchfinder	#15	The Mysteries of Unland	PART 5: October 15, 2014	32	Kim Newman, Maura McHugh	Tyler Crook	Dave Stewart	Julián Totino Tedesco	Witchfinder Volume 3: The Mysteries of Unland TPB; Witchfinder Omnibus Volume 1 HC/TPB
Sir Edward Grey, Witchfinder	#16	City of the Dead	PART 1: August 31, 2016	32	Mike Mignola, Chris Roberson	Ben Stenbeck	Michelle Madsen	Julián Totino Tedesco	Witchfinder Volume 4: The City of the Dead TPB; Witchfinder Omnibus Volume 2 HC/TPB
Sir Edward Grey, Witchfinder	#17	City of the Dead	PART 2: September 28, 2016	32	Mike Mignola, Chris Roberson	Ben Stenbeck	Michelle Madsen	Julián Totino Tedesco	Witchfinder Volume 4: The City of the Dead TPB; Witchfinder Omnibus Volume 2 HC/TPB
Sir Edward Grey, Witchfinder	#18	City of the Dead	PART 3: October 26, 2016	32	Mike Mignola, Chris Roberson	Ben Stenbeck	Michelle Madsen	Julián Totino Tedesco	Witchfinder Volume 4: The City of the Dead TPB; Witchfinder Omnibus Volume 2 HC/TPB
Sir Edward Grey, Witchfinder	#19	City of the Dead	PART 4: November 30, 2016	32	Mike Mignola, Chris Roberson	Ben Stenbeck	Michelle Madsen	Julián Totino Tedesco	Witchfinder Volume 4: The City of the Dead TPB; Witchfinder Omnibus Volume 2 HC/TPB
Sir Edward Grey, Witchfinder	#20	City of the Dead	PART 5: December 28, 2016	32	Mike Mignola, Chris Roberson	Ben Stenbeck	Michelle Madsen	Julián Totino Tedesco	Witchfinder Volume 4: The City of the Dead TPB; Witchfinder Omnibus Volume 2 HC/TPB
Sir Edward Grey, Witchfinder	#21	The Gates of Heaven	PART 1: May 23, 2018	32	Mike Mignola, Chris Roberson	D'Israeli	Michelle Madsen	D'Israeli	Witchfinder Volume 5: The Gates of Heaven TPB; Witchfinder Omnibus Volume 2 HC/TPB
Sir Edward Grey, Witchfinder	#22	The Gates of Heaven	PART 2: June 20, 2018	32	Mike Mignola, Chris Roberson	D'Israeli	Michelle Madsen	D'Israeli	Witchfinder Volume 5: The Gates of Heaven TPB; Witchfinder Omnibus Volume 2 HC/TPB
Sir Edward Grey, Witchfinder	#23	The Gates of Heaven	PART 3: July 18, 2018	32	Mike Mignola, Chris Roberson	D'Israeli	Michelle Madsen	D'Israeli	Witchfinder Volume 5: The Gates of Heaven TPB; Witchfinder Omnibus Volume 2 HC/TPB
Sir Edward Grey, Witchfinder	#24	The Gates of Heaven	PART 4: August 15, 2018	32	Mike Mignola, Chris Roberson	D'Israeli	Michelle Madsen	D'Israeli	Witchfinder Volume 5: The Gates of Heaven TPB; Witchfinder Omnibus Volume 2 HC/TPB
Sir Edward Grey, Witchfinder	#25	The Gates of Heaven	PART 5: September 19, 2018	32	Mike Mignola, Chris Roberson	D'Israeli	Michelle Madsen	D'Israeli	Witchfinder Volume 5: The Gates of Heaven TPB; Witchfinder Omnibus Volume 2 HC/TPB
Sir Edward Grey, Witchfinder	#26	The Reign of Darkness	PART 1: November 27, 2019	32	Mike Mignola, Chris Roberson	Christopher Mitten	Michelle Madsen	Christopher Mitten	Witchfinder Volume 6: The Reign of Darkness TPB; Witchfinder Omnibus Volume 2 HC/TPB
Sir Edward Grey, Witchfinder	#27	The Reign of Darkness	PART 2: December 18, 2019	32	Mike Mignola, Chris Roberson	Christopher Mitten	Michelle Madsen	Christopher Mitten	Witchfinder Volume 6: The Reign of Darkness TPB; Witchfinder Omnibus Volume 2 HC/TPB
Sir Edward Grey, Witchfinder	#28	The Reign of Darkness	PART 3: January 29, 2020	32	Mike Mignola, Chris Roberson	Christopher Mitten	Michelle Madsen	Christopher Mitten	Witchfinder Volume 6: The Reign of Darkness TPB; Witchfinder Omnibus Volume 2 HC/TPB
Sir Edward Grey, Witchfinder	#29	The Reign of Darkness	PART 4: February 26, 2020	32	Mike Mignola, Chris Roberson	Christopher Mitten	Michelle Madsen	Christopher Mitten	Witchfinder Volume 6: The Reign of Darkness TPB; Witchfinder Omnibus Volume 2 HC/TPB
Sir Edward Grey, Witchfinder	#30	The Reign of Darkness	PART 5: March 25, 2020	32	Mike Mignola, Chris Roberson	Christopher Mitten	Michelle Madsen	Christopher Mitten	Witchfinder Volume 6: The Reign of Darkness TPB; Witchfinder Omnibus Volume 2 HC/TPB
Sir Edward Grey: Acheron			December 1, 2021; STENBECK VARIANT COVER: December 1, 2021	32	Mike Mignola	Mike Mignola	Dave Stewart	Mike Mignola; VARIANT: Ben Stenbeck	Koshchei in Hell HC; Koshchei the Deathless Omnibus HC
The Serpent in the Garden: Ed Grey and The Last Battle for England			PART 1: November 27, 2024	32	Mike Mignola	Ben Stenbeck	Dave Stewart	Ben Stenbeck	The Serpent in the Garden: Ed Grey and The Last Battle for England HC; Koshchei the Deathless Omnibus HC
The Serpent in the Garden: Ed Grey and The Last Battle for England			PART 2: January 8, 2025	32	Mike Mignola	Ben Stenbeck	Dave Stewart	Ben Stenbeck	The Serpent in the Garden: Ed Grey and The Last Battle for England HC; Koshchei the Deathless Omnibus HC
The Serpent in the Garden: Ed Grey and The Last Battle for England			PART 3: March 19, 2025	32	Mike Mignola	Ben Stenbeck	Dave Stewart	Ben Stenbeck	The Serpent in the Garden: Ed Grey and The Last Battle for England HC; Koshchei the Deathless Omnibus HC

=== Sir Edward Grey, Witchfinder stories in other publications ===
Canon stories originally published in other publications, including original stories in Hellboy Universe collections. If a story was re-printed in a regular issue later, only that issue is mentioned in the column Collections; for other collections, see the entry of the regular issue.

Story title	Publication	Issue	Published	Format	Pages	Pages (story)	Story	Art	Colors	Cover	ISBN	Collections
Murderous Intent	MySpace Dark Horse Presents	#16	November 5, 2008	Digital	18	8	Mike Mignola	Ben Stenbeck	Dave Stewart	—	—	Witchfinder Volume 1: In the Service of Angels TPB; Witchfinder Omnibus Volume 1 HC/TPB; MySpace Dark Horse Presents #3 TPB
Beware the Ape	Dark Horse Presents; Volume 2	#36	May 21, 2014	Square bound	80	8	Mike Mignola	Ben Stenbeck	Dave Stewart	Ben Stenbeck	—	Witchfinder Volume 3: The Mysteries of Unland TPB; Witchfinder Omnibus Volume 1 HC/TPB

=== Sir Edward Grey, Witchfinder collections ===
Story cycle	Volume	Title	Collects	Published	Format	Pages	Cover	ISBN	Notes
Sir Edward Grey, Witchfinder	1	In the Service of Angels	In the Service of Angels #1–#5; Murderous Intent (short story from MySpace Dark Horse Presents #16); The Burial of Katharine Baker (short story from Hellboy: The Wild Hunt #7); Afterword by Mike Mignola; Sketchbook (10 pages)	April 7, 2010	TPB	160	Mike Mignola	978-1-59582-483-7	
Sir Edward Grey, Witchfinder	2	Lost and Gone Forever	Lost and Gone Forever #1–#5; Afterword by John Arcudi; Sketchbook (9 pages)	January 11, 2012	TPB	136	Mike Mignola	978-1-59582-794-4	
Sir Edward Grey, Witchfinder	3	The Mysteries of Unland	The Mysteries of Unland #1–#5; Beware the Ape (short story from Dark Horse Presents Volume 2 #36); Sketchbook (18 pages)	April 22, 2015	TPB	144	Mike Mignola	978-1-61655-630-3	
Sir Edward Grey, Witchfinder	4	City of the Dead	City of the Dead #1–#5; Sketchbook (10 pages)	April 19, 2017	TPB	144	Julian Totino Tedesco	978-1-5067-0166-0	
Sir Edward Grey, Witchfinder	5	The Gates of Heaven	The Gates of Heaven #1–#5; Sketchbook (18 pages)	January 2, 2019	TPB	144	Julian Totino Tedesco	978-1-5067-0683-2	
Sir Edward Grey, Witchfinder	6	The Reign of Darkness	The Reign of Darkness #1–#5; Sketchbook (18 pages)	October 7, 2020	TPB	144	Julian Totino Tedesco	978-1-5067-1406-6	
Hellboy Universe Essentials: Witchfinder			Introduction by Ben Stenbeck; In the Service of Angels #1–#5	August 10, 2022	TPB	128	Mike Mignola	978-1-5067-2505-5	Stories already published in previous collections
The Serpent in the Garden: Ed Grey and The Last Battle for England			The Serpent in the Garden: Ed Grey and The Last Battle for England #1–#3; Sketchbook	September 2, 2025	HC	112	Ben Stenbeck	978-1-5067-4518-3	

=== Sir Edward Grey, Witchfinder omnibus editions ===
Omnibus editions collecting multiple trade paperbacks.

Title	Collects	Published	Format	Pages	Cover	ISBN	Notes
Sir Edward Grey, Witchfinder Omnibus Volume 1	Introduction by Mike Mignola; In the Service of Angels TPB; Lost and Gone Forever TPB; The Mysteries of Unland TPB; Extended sketchbook	November 27, 2019	HC	440	Mike Mignola	978-1-5067-1442-4	Story order was re-arranged
Sir Edward Grey, Witchfinder Omnibus Volume 1	Introduction by Mike Mignola; In the Service of Angels TPB; Lost and Gone Forever TPB; The Mysteries of Unland TPB; Extended sketchbook	April 3, 2024	TPB	440	Mike Mignola	978-1-5067-4073-7	Story order was re-arranged
Sir Edward Grey, Witchfinder Omnibus Volume 2	Introduction by Chris Roberson; City of the Dead TPB; The Gates of Heaven TPB; The Reign of Darkness TPB; The Great Blizzard (short story from Hellboy Winter Special 2017); Extended sketchbook	November 17, 2021	HC	424	Mike Mignola	978-1-5067-2617-5	
Sir Edward Grey, Witchfinder Omnibus Volume 2	Introduction by Chris Roberson; City of the Dead TPB; The Gates of Heaven TPB; The Reign of Darkness TPB; The Great Blizzard (short story from Hellboy Winter Special 2017); Extended sketchbook	August 14, 2024	TPB	424	Mike Mignola	978-1-5067-4074-4	

== Frankenstein ==
=== Frankenstein issues ===
Title	Published	Pages	Story	Art	Colors	Cover	Collections	Notes
Frankenstein Underground	PART 1: March 18, 2015	32	Mike Mignola	Ben Stenbeck	Dave Stewart	Mike Mignola	Frankenstein Underground TPB	
Frankenstein Underground	PART 2: April 22, 2015	32	Mike Mignola	Ben Stenbeck	Dave Stewart	Mike Mignola	Frankenstein Underground TPB	
Frankenstein Underground	PART 3: May 27, 2015	32	Mike Mignola	Ben Stenbeck	Dave Stewart	Mike Mignola	Frankenstein Underground TPB	
Frankenstein Underground	PART 4: June 24, 2015	32	Mike Mignola	Ben Stenbeck	Dave Stewart	Mike Mignola	Frankenstein Underground TPB	
Frankenstein Underground	PART 5: July 22, 2015	32	Mike Mignola	Ben Stenbeck	Dave Stewart	Mike Mignola	Frankenstein Underground TPB	
Frankenstein Undone	PART 1: January 29, 2020; MIGNOLA VARIANT COVER: January 29, 2020	32	Mike Mignola, Scott Allie	Ben Stenbeck	Brennan Wagner	Ben Stenbeck; VARIANT: Mike Mignola	—	Canceled after publication of second issue following sexual harassment allegations surrounding Scott Allie
Frankenstein Undone	PART 2: May 27, 2020; D'ARMINI VARIANT COVER: May 27, 2020	32	Mike Mignola, Scott Allie	Ben Stenbeck	Brennan Wagner	Ben Stenbeck; VARIANT: Simone D'Armini	—	Canceled after publication of second issue following sexual harassment allegations surrounding Scott Allie
Frankenstein Undone	PART 3: canceled		Mike Mignola, Scott Allie	Ben Stenbeck	Brennan Wagner	—	—	Canceled after publication of second issue following sexual harassment allegations surrounding Scott Allie
Frankenstein Undone	PART 4: canceled		Mike Mignola, Scott Allie	Ben Stenbeck	Brennan Wagner	—	—	Canceled after publication of second issue following sexual harassment allegations surrounding Scott Allie
Frankenstein Undone	PART 5: canceled		Mike Mignola, Scott Allie	Ben Stenbeck	Brennan Wagner	—	—	Canceled after publication of second issue following sexual harassment allegations surrounding Scott Allie
New World	PART 1: August 03, 2022; MIGNOLA VARIANT COVER: August 03, 2022	32	Mike Mignola, Thomas E. Sniegoski, Christopher Golden	Peter Bergting	Michelle Madsen	Peter Bergting; VARIANT: Mike Mignola	Frankenstein: New World HC	
New World	PART 2: September 21, 2022; HITCHCOCK VARIANT COVER: September 21, 2022	32	Mike Mignola, Thomas E. Sniegoski, Christopher Golden	Peter Bergting	Michelle Madsen	Peter Bergting; VARIANT: David Hitchcock	Frankenstein: New World HC	
New World	PART 3: November 16, 2022; CAMPBELL VARIANT COVER: November 16, 2022	32	Mike Mignola, Thomas E. Sniegoski, Christopher Golden	Peter Bergting	Michelle Madsen	Peter Bergting; VARIANT: Laurence Campbell	Frankenstein: New World HC	
New World	PART 4: December 28, 2022; STENBECK VARIANT COVER: December 28, 2022	32	Mike Mignola, Thomas E. Sniegoski, Christopher Golden	Peter Bergting	Michelle Madsen	Peter Bergting; VARIANT: Ben Stenbeck	Frankenstein: New World HC	
New World – The Sea of Forever	PART 1: February 05, 2025	32	Mike Mignola, Christopher Golden, Thomas E. Sniegoski	Peter Bergting	Michelle Madsen	Peter Bergting	Frankenstein: New World Volume 2 – The Sea of Forever HC	
New World – The Sea of Forever	PART 2: March 26, 2025	32	Mike Mignola, Christopher Golden, Thomas E. Sniegoski	Peter Bergting	Michelle Madsen	Peter Bergting	Frankenstein: New World Volume 2 – The Sea of Forever HC	
New World – The Sea of Forever	PART 3: April 30, 2025	32	Mike Mignola, Christopher Golden, Thomas E. Sniegoski	Peter Bergting	Michelle Madsen	Peter Bergting	Frankenstein: New World Volume 2 – The Sea of Forever HC	
New World – The Sea of Forever	PART 4: June 11, 2025	32	Mike Mignola, Christopher Golden, Thomas E. Sniegoski	Peter Bergting	Michelle Madsen	Peter Bergting	Frankenstein: New World Volume 2 – The Sea of Forever HC	

=== Frankenstein collections ===
Story cycle	Volume	Title	Collects	Published	Format	Pages	Cover	ISBN
Frankenstein Underground			Frankenstein Underground #1–#5; Sketchbook (18 pages)	November 25, 2015	TPB	144	Mike Mignola	978-1-61655-782-9
New World	1	New World	New World #1–#4; Sketchbook (16 pages)	May 10, 2023	HC	112	Peter Bergting	978-1-5067-3343-2
New World	2	The Sea of Forever	The Sea of Forever #1–#4; Sketchbook	December 2, 2025	HC	112	Peter Bergting	978-1-5067-4591-6

== Young Hellboy ==
=== Young Hellboy issues ===
Title	Published	Pages	Story	Art	Colors	Cover	Collections
The Hidden Land	PART 1: February 17, 2021; MIGNOLA VARIANT COVER: February 17, 2021; JETPACK COMICS VARIANT COVER: February 17, 2021	32	Mike Mignola, Thomas E. Sniegoski	Craig Rousseau	Dave Stewart	Matt Smith; VARIANT: Mike Mignola; JETPACK COMICS VARIANT: Craig Rousseau	Young Hellboy: The Hidden Land HC
The Hidden Land	PART 2: March 31, 2021; ARAGNO VARIANT COVER: March 31, 2021	32	Mike Mignola, Thomas E. Sniegoski	Craig Rousseau	Dave Stewart	Matt Smith; VARIANT: Rachele Aragno	Young Hellboy: The Hidden Land HC
The Hidden Land	PART 3: April 14, 2021; BECKERT VARIANT COVER: April 14, 2021	32	Mike Mignola, Thomas E. Sniegoski	Craig Rousseau	Dave Stewart	Matt Smith; VARIANT: Wylie Beckert	Young Hellboy: The Hidden Land HC
The Hidden Land	PART 4: June 2, 2021; CARPENTER VARIANT COVER: June 2, 2021	32	Mike Mignola, Thomas E. Sniegoski	Craig Rousseau	Dave Stewart	Matt Smith; VARIANT: Anthony Carpenter	Young Hellboy: The Hidden Land HC
Assault on Castle Death	PART 1: July 20, 2022; ZONJIC VARIANT COVER: July 20, 2022	32	Mike Mignola, Thomas E. Sniegoski	Craig Rousseau	Chris O'Halloran	Matt Smith; VARIANT: Tonci Zonjic	Young Hellboy: Assault on Castle Death HC
Assault on Castle Death	PART 2: September 21, 2022; OEMING VARIANT COVER: September 21, 2022	32	Mike Mignola, Thomas E. Sniegoski	Craig Rousseau	Chris O'Halloran	Matt Smith; VARIANT: Michael Avon Oeming	Young Hellboy: Assault on Castle Death HC
Assault on Castle Death	PART 3: November 16, 2022; ROSSEAU VARIANT COVER: November 16, 2022	32	Mike Mignola, Thomas E. Sniegoski	Craig Rousseau	Chris O'Halloran	Matt Smith; VARIANT: Craig Rousseau	Young Hellboy: Assault on Castle Death HC
Assault on Castle Death	PART 4: February 1, 2023; TREIMAN VARIANT COVER: February 1, 2023	32	Mike Mignola, Thomas E. Sniegoski	Craig Rousseau	Chris O'Halloran	Matt Smith; VARIANT: Lissa Treiman	Young Hellboy: Assault on Castle Death HC

=== Young Hellboy collections ===
Title	Collects	Published	Format	Pages	Cover	ISBN
The Hidden Land	The Hidden Land #1–#4; Sketchbook (18 pages)	October 13, 2021	HC	120	Matt Smith	978-1-5067-2398-3
Assault on Castle Death	Assault on Castle Death #1–#4; Sketchbook (10 pages)	July 5, 2023	HC	112	Matt Smith	978-1-5067-3331-9

== Other canon stories ==
Canonical stories that are part of the overall plot.

=== Other canon issues ===
Title	Issue	Published	Pages	Story	Art	Colors	Cover	Collections	Notes
Sledgehammer 44	#1	March 13, 2013	32	Mike Mignola, John Arcudi	Jason Latour	Dave Stewart	Mike Mignola	Sledgehammer 44 TPB; Hellboy Universe: The Secret Histories HC	
Sledgehammer 44	#2	April 10, 2013	32	Mike Mignola, John Arcudi	Jason Latour	Dave Stewart	Mike Mignola	Sledgehammer 44 TPB; Hellboy Universe: The Secret Histories HC	
Sledgehammer 44: Lightning War	#1	November 27, 2013	32	Mike Mignola, John Arcudi	Laurence Campbell	Dave Stewart	Mike Mignola	Sledgehammer 44 TPB; Hellboy Universe: The Secret Histories HC	
Sledgehammer 44: Lightning War	#2	December 18, 2013	32	Mike Mignola, John Arcudi	Laurence Campbell	Dave Stewart	Mike Mignola	Sledgehammer 44 TPB; Hellboy Universe: The Secret Histories HC	
Sledgehammer 44: Lightning War	#3	January 29, 2014	32	Mike Mignola, John Arcudi	Laurence Campbell	Dave Stewart	Mike Mignola	Sledgehammer 44 TPB; Hellboy Universe: The Secret Histories HC	
Rise of the Black Flame	#1	September 07, 2016	32	Mike Mignola, Chris Roberson	Christopher Mitten	Dave Stewart	Laurence Campbell	Rise of the Black Flame TPB	
Rise of the Black Flame	#2	October 05, 2016	32	Mike Mignola, Chris Roberson	Christopher Mitten	Dave Stewart	Laurence Campbell	Rise of the Black Flame TPB	
Rise of the Black Flame	#3	November 02, 2016	32	Mike Mignola, Chris Roberson	Christopher Mitten	Dave Stewart	Laurence Campbell	Rise of the Black Flame TPB	
Rise of the Black Flame	#4	December 07, 2016	32	Mike Mignola, Chris Roberson	Christopher Mitten	Dave Stewart	Laurence Campbell	Rise of the Black Flame TPB	
Rise of the Black Flame	#5	January 04, 2017	32	Mike Mignola, Chris Roberson	Christopher Mitten	Dave Stewart	Laurence Campbell	Rise of the Black Flame TPB	
The Visitor: How & Why He Stayed	#1	February 22, 2017	32	Mike Mignola, Chris Roberson	Paul Grist	Bill Crabtree	Paul Grist	The Visitor: How & Why He Stayed TPB; Hellboy Universe: The Secret Histories HC	
The Visitor: How & Why He Stayed	#2	March 29, 2017	32	Mike Mignola, Chris Roberson	Paul Grist	Bill Crabtree	Paul Grist	The Visitor: How & Why He Stayed TPB; Hellboy Universe: The Secret Histories HC	
The Visitor: How & Why He Stayed	#3	April 26, 2017	32	Mike Mignola, Chris Roberson	Paul Grist	Bill Crabtree	Paul Grist	The Visitor: How & Why He Stayed TPB; Hellboy Universe: The Secret Histories HC	
The Visitor: How & Why He Stayed	#4	May 31, 2017	32	Mike Mignola, Chris Roberson	Paul Grist	Bill Crabtree	Paul Grist	The Visitor: How & Why He Stayed TPB; Hellboy Universe: The Secret Histories HC	
The Visitor: How & Why He Stayed	#5	July 05, 2017	32	Mike Mignola, Chris Roberson	Paul Grist	Bill Crabtree	Paul Grist	The Visitor: How & Why He Stayed TPB; Hellboy Universe: The Secret Histories HC	
Rasputin: The Voice of the Dragon	#1	November 15, 2017; MIGNOLA VARIANT COVER: November 15, 2017	32	Mike Mignola, Chris Roberson	Christopher Mitten	Dave Stewart	Mike Huddleston; VARIANT: Mike Mignola	Rasputin: The Voice of the Dragon TPB; Hellboy Universe: The Secret Histories HC	
Rasputin: The Voice of the Dragon	#2	December 06, 2017; MANCHESS VARIANT COVER: December 06, 2017	32	Mike Mignola, Chris Roberson	Christopher Mitten	Dave Stewart	Mike Huddleston; VARIANT: Greg Manchess	Rasputin: The Voice of the Dragon TPB; Hellboy Universe: The Secret Histories HC	
Rasputin: The Voice of the Dragon	#3	December 27, 2017; FRANCAVILLA VARIANT COVER: December 27, 2017	32	Mike Mignola, Chris Roberson	Christopher Mitten	Dave Stewart	Mike Huddleston; VARIANT: Francesco Francavilla	Rasputin: The Voice of the Dragon TPB; Hellboy Universe: The Secret Histories HC	
Rasputin: The Voice of the Dragon	#4	February 07, 2018; DEL REY VARIANT COVER: February 07, 2018	32	Mike Mignola, Chris Roberson	Christopher Mitten	Dave Stewart	Mike Huddleston; VARIANT: Vanesa Del Rey	Rasputin: The Voice of the Dragon TPB; Hellboy Universe: The Secret Histories HC	
Rasputin: The Voice of the Dragon	#5	March 07, 2018; KALUTA VARIANT COVER: March 07, 2018	32	Mike Mignola, Chris Roberson	Christopher Mitten	Dave Stewart	Mike Huddleston; VARIANT: Michael Kaluta	Rasputin: The Voice of the Dragon TPB; Hellboy Universe: The Secret Histories HC	
Koshchei the Deathless	#1	January 03, 2018	32	Mike Mignola	Ben Stenbeck	Dave Stewart	Mike Mignola	Koshchei the Deathless TPB; Koshchei the Deathless Omnibus HC	
Koshchei the Deathless	#2	February 07, 2018	32	Mike Mignola	Ben Stenbeck	Dave Stewart	Mike Mignola	Koshchei the Deathless TPB; Koshchei the Deathless Omnibus HC	
Koshchei the Deathless	#3	March 07, 2018	32	Mike Mignola	Ben Stenbeck	Dave Stewart	Mike Mignola	Koshchei the Deathless TPB; Koshchei the Deathless Omnibus HC	
Koshchei the Deathless	#4	April 04, 2018	32	Mike Mignola	Ben Stenbeck	Dave Stewart	Mike Mignola	Koshchei the Deathless TPB; Koshchei the Deathless Omnibus HC	
Koshchei the Deathless	#5	May 02, 2018	32	Mike Mignola	Ben Stenbeck	Dave Stewart	Mike Mignola	Koshchei the Deathless TPB; Koshchei the Deathless Omnibus HC	
Koshchei the Deathless	#6	June 06, 2018	32	Mike Mignola	Ben Stenbeck	Dave Stewart	Mike Mignola	Koshchei the Deathless TPB; Koshchei the Deathless Omnibus HC	
Crimson Lotus	#1	November 21, 2018	32	John Arcudi	Mindy Lee	Michelle Madsen	Tonci Zonjic	Crimson Lotus TPB	
Crimson Lotus	#2	December 19, 2018	32	John Arcudi	Mindy Lee	Michelle Madsen	Tonci Zonjic	Crimson Lotus TPB	
Crimson Lotus	#3	January 30, 2019	32	John Arcudi	Mindy Lee	Michelle Madsen	Tonci Zonjic	Crimson Lotus TPB	
Crimson Lotus	#4	February 27, 2019	32	John Arcudi	Mindy Lee	Michelle Madsen	Tonci Zonjic	Crimson Lotus TPB	
Crimson Lotus	#5	March 27, 2019	32	John Arcudi	Mindy Lee	Michelle Madsen	Tonci Zonjic	Crimson Lotus TPB	
The Last Knight of St. Hagan	#1	canceled		Mike Mignola, Scott Allie	Andrea Mutti	Lee Loughridge	—	—	Originally intended to debut on April 15, 2020; canceled before publication of first issue following sexual harassment allegations surrounding Scott Allie
The Last Knight of St. Hagan	#2	canceled		Mike Mignola, Scott Allie	Andrea Mutti	Lee Loughridge	—	—	Originally intended to debut on April 15, 2020; canceled before publication of first issue following sexual harassment allegations surrounding Scott Allie
The Last Knight of St. Hagan	#3	canceled		Mike Mignola, Scott Allie	Andrea Mutti	Lee Loughridge	—	—	Originally intended to debut on April 15, 2020; canceled before publication of first issue following sexual harassment allegations surrounding Scott Allie
The Last Knight of St. Hagan	#4	canceled		Mike Mignola, Scott Allie	Andrea Mutti	Lee Loughridge	—	—	Originally intended to debut on April 15, 2020; canceled before publication of first issue following sexual harassment allegations surrounding Scott Allie
The House of Lost Horizons: A Sarah Jewell Mystery	#1	May 12, 2021	32	Mike Mignola, Chris Roberson	Leila del Duca	Michelle Madsen	Christopher Mitten	The House of Lost Horizons: A Sarah Jewell Mystery HC	
The House of Lost Horizons: A Sarah Jewell Mystery	#2	June 16, 2021	32	Mike Mignola, Chris Roberson	Leila del Duca	Michelle Madsen	Christopher Mitten	The House of Lost Horizons: A Sarah Jewell Mystery HC	
The House of Lost Horizons: A Sarah Jewell Mystery	#3	July 14, 2021	32	Mike Mignola, Chris Roberson	Leila del Duca	Michelle Madsen	Christopher Mitten	The House of Lost Horizons: A Sarah Jewell Mystery HC	
The House of Lost Horizons: A Sarah Jewell Mystery	#4	August 11, 2021	32	Mike Mignola, Chris Roberson	Leila del Duca	Michelle Madsen	Christopher Mitten	The House of Lost Horizons: A Sarah Jewell Mystery HC	
The House of Lost Horizons: A Sarah Jewell Mystery	#5	September 15, 2021	32	Mike Mignola, Chris Roberson	Leila del Duca	Michelle Madsen	Christopher Mitten	The House of Lost Horizons: A Sarah Jewell Mystery HC	
The Sword of Hyperborea	#1	January 12, 2022; MITTEN VARIANT COVER: January 12, 2022	32	Mike Mignola, Rob Williams	Laurence Campbell	Quinton Winter, Dave Stewart	Laurence Campbell; VARIANT: Christopher Mitten	The Sword of Hyperborea HC	
The Sword of Hyperborea	#2	February 16, 2022; LI VARIANT COVER: February 16, 2022	32	Mike Mignola, Rob Williams	Laurence Campbell	Quinton Winter, Dave Stewart	Laurence Campbell; VARIANT: Yishan Li	The Sword of Hyperborea HC	
The Sword of Hyperborea	#3	March 16, 2022; LONERGAN VARIANT COVER: March 16, 2022	32	Mike Mignola, Rob Williams	Laurence Campbell	Quinton Winter, Dave Stewart	Laurence Campbell; VARIANT: Jesse Lonergan	The Sword of Hyperborea HC	
The Sword of Hyperborea	#4	April 13, 2022; GÓMEZ VARIANT COVER: April 13, 2022	32	Mike Mignola, Rob Williams	Laurence Campbell	Quinton Winter, Dave Stewart	Laurence Campbell; VARIANT: Bizar Gómez	The Sword of Hyperborea HC	
The British Paranormal Society: Time Out of Mind	#1	April 27, 2022	32	Mike Mignola, Chris Roberson	Andrea Mutti	Lee Loughridge	Sebastián Fiumara	The British Paranormal Society: Time Out of Mind HC	
The British Paranormal Society: Time Out of Mind	#2	May 25, 2022	32	Mike Mignola, Chris Roberson	Andrea Mutti	Lee Loughridge	Sebastián Fiumara	The British Paranormal Society: Time Out of Mind HC	
The British Paranormal Society: Time Out of Mind	#3	July 13, 2022	32	Mike Mignola, Chris Roberson	Andrea Mutti	Lee Loughridge	Sebastián Fiumara	The British Paranormal Society: Time Out of Mind HC	
The British Paranormal Society: Time Out of Mind	#4	October 05, 2022	32	Mike Mignola, Chris Roberson	Andrea Mutti	Lee Loughridge	Sebastián Fiumara	The British Paranormal Society: Time Out of Mind HC	
Castle Full of Blackbirds	#1	September 14, 2022; DEL REY VARIANT COVER: September 14, 2022	32	Mike Mignola, Angela Slatter	Valeria Burzo	Michelle Madsen	Wylie Beckert; VARIANT: Vanesa Del Rey	Castle Full of Blackbirds HC	
Castle Full of Blackbirds	#2	October 19, 2022; STRYCHOWSKA VARIANT COVER: October 19, 2022	32	Mike Mignola, Angela Slatter	Valeria Burzo	Michelle Madsen	Wylie Beckert; VARIANT: Marianna Strychowska	Castle Full of Blackbirds HC	
Castle Full of Blackbirds	#3	December 07, 2022; GALLAGHER VARIANT COVER: December 07, 2022	32	Mike Mignola, Angela Slatter	Valeria Burzo	Michelle Madsen	Wylie Beckert; VARIANT: Evangeline Gallagher	Castle Full of Blackbirds HC	
Castle Full of Blackbirds	#4	March 01, 2023; SZABLA VARIANT COVER: March 01, 2023	32	Mike Mignola, Angela Slatter	Valeria Burzo	Michelle Madsen	Wylie Beckert; VARIANT: A. H. Szabla	Castle Full of Blackbirds HC	
Koshchei in Hell	#1	November 30, 2022	32	Mike Mignola	Ben Stenbeck	Dave Stewart	Ben Stenbeck	Koshchei in Hell HC; Koshchei the Deathless Omnibus HC	
Koshchei in Hell	#2	February 08, 2023	32	Mike Mignola	Ben Stenbeck	Dave Stewart	Ben Stenbeck	Koshchei in Hell HC; Koshchei the Deathless Omnibus HC	
Koshchei in Hell	#3	March 01, 2023	32	Mike Mignola	Ben Stenbeck	Dave Stewart	Ben Stenbeck	Koshchei in Hell HC; Koshchei the Deathless Omnibus HC	
Koshchei in Hell	#4	April 05, 2023	32	Mike Mignola	Ben Stenbeck	Dave Stewart	Ben Stenbeck	Koshchei in Hell HC; Koshchei the Deathless Omnibus HC	
Miss Truesdale and the Fall of Hyperborea	#1	May 17, 2023; MIGNOLA VARIANT COVER: May 17, 2023	32	Mike Mignola	Jesse Lonergan	Jesse Lonergan	Jesse Lonergan; VARIANT: Mike Mignola	Miss Truesdale and the Fall of Hyperborea HC	
Miss Truesdale and the Fall of Hyperborea	#2	June 14, 2023; LARSEN VARIANT COVER: June 14, 2023	32	Mike Mignola	Jesse Lonergan	Jesse Lonergan	Jesse Lonergan; VARIANT: Christine Larsen	Miss Truesdale and the Fall of Hyperborea HC	
Miss Truesdale and the Fall of Hyperborea	#3	July 19, 2023; CHARRETIER VARIANT COVER: July 19, 2023	32	Mike Mignola	Jesse Lonergan	Jesse Lonergan	Jesse Lonergan; VARIANT: Elsa Charretier	Miss Truesdale and the Fall of Hyperborea HC	
Miss Truesdale and the Fall of Hyperborea	#4	August 16, 2023; CRAIG VARIANT COVER: August 16, 2023	32	Mike Mignola	Jesse Lonergan	Jesse Lonergan	Jesse Lonergan; VARIANT: Wes Craig	Miss Truesdale and the Fall of Hyperborea HC	
Panya: The Mummy's Curse	#1	July 12, 2023	32	Mike Mignola, Chris Roberson	Christopher Mitten	Michelle Madsen	Christopher Mitten	Panya: The Mummy's Curse HC	
Panya: The Mummy's Curse	#2	August 16, 2023	32	Mike Mignola, Chris Roberson	Christopher Mitten	Michelle Madsen	Christopher Mitten	Panya: The Mummy's Curse HC	
Panya: The Mummy's Curse	#3	September 20, 2023	32	Mike Mignola, Chris Roberson	Christopher Mitten	Michelle Madsen	Christopher Mitten	Panya: The Mummy's Curse HC	
Panya: The Mummy's Curse	#4	November 08, 2023	32	Mike Mignola, Chris Roberson	Christopher Mitten	Michelle Madsen	Christopher Mitten	Panya: The Mummy's Curse HC	
Shadow of the Golden Crane	#1	January 15, 2025	32	Mike Mignola, Chris Roberson	Michael Avon Oeming	Michael Avon Oeming	Michael Avon Oeming	Shadow of the Golden Crane HC	
Shadow of the Golden Crane	#2	March 26, 2025	32	Mike Mignola, Chris Roberson	Michael Avon Oeming	Michael Avon Oeming	Michael Avon Oeming	Shadow of the Golden Crane HC	
Shadow of the Golden Crane	#3	April 16, 2025	32	Mike Mignola, Chris Roberson	Michael Avon Oeming	Michael Avon Oeming	Michael Avon Oeming	Shadow of the Golden Crane HC	
Shadow of the Golden Crane	#4	June 25, 2025	32	Mike Mignola, Chris Roberson	Michael Avon Oeming	Michael Avon Oeming	Michael Avon Oeming	Shadow of the Golden Crane HC	
Captain Henry and the Graveyard of Time	#1	October 22, 2025; MIGNOLA VARIANT COVER: October 22, 2025	32	Mike Mignola, Bruce Zick	Bruce Zick	Bruce Zick	Bruce Zick; VARIANT: Mike Mignola	Captain Henry and the Graveyard of Time HC	
Captain Henry and the Graveyard of Time	#2	December 10, 2025; NIXEY VARIANT COVER: October 22, 2025	32	Mike Mignola, Bruce Zick	Bruce Zick	Bruce Zick	Bruce Zick; VARIANT: Troy Nixey	Captain Henry and the Graveyard of Time HC	
Captain Henry and the Graveyard of Time	#3	Announced for: January 14, 2026; STENBECK VARIANT COVER: January 14, 2026	32	Mike Mignola, Bruce Zick	Bruce Zick	Bruce Zick	Bruce Zick; VARIANT: Ben Stenbeck	Captain Henry and the Graveyard of Time HC	
Captain Henry and the Graveyard of Time	#4	Announced for: February 18, 2026; KALUTA VARIANT COVER: February 18, 2026	32	Mike Mignola, Bruce Zick	Bruce Zick	Bruce Zick	Bruce Zick; VARIANT: Michael Kaluta	Captain Henry and the Graveyard of Time HC	
Miss Truesdale and the Rise of Man	#1	December 10, 2025; LONERGAN VARIANT COVER: December 10, 2025	32	Mike Mignola	Jesse Lonergan	Jesse Lonergan	Jesse Lonergan; VARIANT: Jesse Lonergan		
Miss Truesdale and the Rise of Man	#2	Announced for: January 21, 2026; LONERGAN VARIANT COVER: January 21, 2026	32	Mike Mignola	Jesse Lonergan	Jesse Lonergan	Jesse Lonergan; VARIANT: Jesse Lonergan		
Miss Truesdale and the Rise of Man	#3	Announced for: February 25, 2026; LONERGAN VARIANT COVER: February 25, 2026	32	Mike Mignola	Jesse Lonergan	Jesse Lonergan	Jesse Lonergan; VARIANT: Jesse Lonergan		
Miss Truesdale and the Rise of Man	#4	Announced for: March 25, 2026; LONERGAN VARIANT COVER: March 25, 2026	32	Mike Mignola	Jesse Lonergan	Jesse Lonergan	Jesse Lonergan; VARIANT: Jesse Lonergan		
Carmen Red Claw: Belly of the Beast	#1	Announced for: January 7, 2026; MIGNOLA VARIANT COVER: January 7, 20265	32	Rae Allen	Rae Allen	Rae Allen	Rae Allen; VARIANT: Mike Mignola		
Carmen Red Claw: Belly of the Beast	#2	Announced for: February 18, 2026; PARKER VARIANT COVER: February 18, 2026	32	Rae Allen	Rae Allen	Rae Allen	Rae Allen; VARIANT: Jake Parker		
Carmen Red Claw: Belly of the Beast	#3	Announced for: March 18, 2026; ZONJIC VARIANT COVER: March 18, 2026	32	Rae Allen	Rae Allen	Rae Allen	Rae Allen; VARIANT: Tonci Zonjic		
Carmen Red Claw: Belly of the Beast	#4	Not yet announced		Rae Allen	Rae Allen	Rae Allen			
The Crown: A Tale of Hell	#1	Announced for: February 11, 2026; MIGNOLA VARIANT COVER: February 11, 2026	32	Mike Mignola, Todd Mignola	Warwick Johnson-Cadwell	Warwick Johnson-Cadwell	Warwick Johnson-Cadwell; VARIANT: Mike Mignola		
The Crown: A Tale of Hell	#2	Announced for: March 25, 2026; SEELIG VARIANT COVER: March 25, 2026	32	Mike Mignola, Todd Mignola	Warwick Johnson-Cadwell	Warwick Johnson-Cadwell	Warwick Johnson-Cadwell; VARIANT: Bruno Seelig		

=== Other canon collections ===
Title	Collects	Published	Format	Pages	Cover	ISBN
Sledgehammer 44	Sledgehammer 44 #1–#2; Sledgehammer 44: Lightning War #1–#3; Afterword by Scott Allie; Sketchbook (17 pages)	May 28, 2014	TPB	144	Mike Mignola	978-1-61655-395-1
Rise of the Black Flame	Rise of the Black Flame #1–#5; Sketchbook (10 pages)	May 3, 2017	TPB	144	Laurence Campbell	978-1-5067-0155-4
The Visitor: How & Why He Stayed	The Visitor: How & Why He Stayed #1–#5; God Rest Ye Merry (short story from Hellboy Winter Special 2017); Afterword by Chris Roberson; Sketchbook (7 pages)	October 4, 2017	TPB	144	Paul Grist	978-1-5067-0345-9
Rasputin: The Voice of the Dragon	Rasputin: The Voice of the Dragon #1–#5; Sketchbook (10 pages)	July 25, 2018	TPB	144	Mike Mignola	978-1-5067-0498-2
Koshchei the Deathless	Koshchei the Deathless #1–#6; Sketchbook (18 pages)	September 12, 2018	TPB	168	Mike Mignola	978-1-5067-0672-6
Crimson Lotus	Crimson Lotus #1–#5; Sketchbook (18 pages)	July 3, 2019	TPB	144	Tonci Zonjic	978-1-5067-0822-5
The House of Lost Horizons: A Sarah Jewell Mystery	The House of Lost Horizons #1–#5; The Longest Night (short story from Hellboy Winter Special 2019); Sketchbook (12 pages)	February 9, 2022	HC	136	Christopher Mitten	978-1-5067-2006-7
The Sword of Hyperborea	Introduction by Laurence Campbell; Introduction by Rob Williams; The Sword of Hyperborea #1–#4; Sketchbook (18 pages)	September 14, 2022	HC	136	Laurence Campbell	978-1-5067-2982-4
The British Paranormal Society: Time Out of Mind	The British Paranormal Society: Time Out of Mind #1–#4; Sketchbook (18 pages)	February 8, 2023	HC	112	Sebastián Fiumara	978-1-5067-3260-2
Castle Full of Blackbirds	Castle Full of Blackbirds #1–#4; Sketchbook	July 26, 2023	HC	112	Wylie Beckert	978-1-5067-3278-7
Koshchei in Hell	Sir Edward Grey: Acheron (one-shot); Koshchei in Hell #1–#4; Koshchei in Hell epilogue (6 pages); Sketchbook (12 pages)	September 6, 2023	HC	144	Mike Mignola	978-1-5067-3347-0
Miss Truesdale and the Fall of Hyperborea	Miss Truesdale and the Fall of Hyperborea #1–#4; Sketchbook (22 pages)	January 31, 2024	HC	120	Jesse Lonergan	978-1-5067-3817-8
Panya: The Mummy's Curse	Panya: The Mummy's Curse #1–#4; Sketchbook (18 pages)	April 3, 2024	HC	112	Christopher Mitten	978-1-5067-3819-2
Shadow of the Golden Crane	Shadow of the Golden Crane #1–#4; Sketchbook	November 11, 2025	HC	112	Michael Avon Oeming	978-1-5067-4602-9
Captain Henry and the Graveyard of Time	Captain Henry and the Graveyard of Time #1–#4; Bonus material	Announced for: July 21, 2026	HC	112	Bruce Zick	978-1-5067-5089-7

=== Other canon omnibus editions ===
Omnibus editions collecting multiple trade paperbacks.

Title	Collects	Published	Format	Pages	Cover	ISBN
Hellboy Universe: The Secret Histories	Introduction by Chris Roberson; Rasputin: The Voice of the Dragon; Sledgehammer 44; The Visitor: How and Why He Stayed; Extended sketchbook	June 2, 2021	HC	432	Mike Mignola	978-1-5067-2524-6
Hellboy Universe: The Secret Histories	Introduction by Chris Roberson; Rasputin: The Voice of the Dragon; Sledgehammer 44; The Visitor: How and Why He Stayed; Extended sketchbook	Announced for: March 24, 2026	TPB	?	Mike Mignola	978-1-5067-5462-8
Koshchei the Deathless Omnibus	Koshchei the Deathless; Koshchei in Hell; Sir Edward Grey: Acheron; The Serpent in the Garden: Ed Grey and The Last Battle for England; Cover gallery; Sketchbook	Announced for: June 16, 2026	HC	408	Mike Mignola	978-1-5067-4598-5

== Non-canon stories ==
Non-canonical stories written by various writers.

=== Hellboy Junior issues ===
Title	Published	Pages	Story	Art	Colors	Cover	Collections
Hellboy Junior Halloween Special	October 15, 1997	48	Maggots, Maggots, Everywhere			Bill Wray	Hellboy Junior TPB
Hellboy Junior Halloween Special	October 15, 1997	48	Bill Wray			Bill Wray	Hellboy Junior TPB
Hellboy Junior Halloween Special	October 15, 1997	48	Wheezy The Sick Little Witch			Bill Wray	Hellboy Junior TPB
Hellboy Junior Halloween Special	October 15, 1997	48	Bill Wray	Stephen DeStefano	Bill Wray	Bill Wray	Hellboy Junior TPB
Hellboy Junior Halloween Special	October 15, 1997	48	The Ginger-Beef Boy			Bill Wray	Hellboy Junior TPB
Hellboy Junior Halloween Special	October 15, 1997	48	Bill Wray	Hilary Barta	Bill Wray	Bill Wray	Hellboy Junior TPB
Hellboy Junior Halloween Special	October 15, 1997	48	The Creation of Hellboy Jr.			Bill Wray	Hellboy Junior TPB
Hellboy Junior Halloween Special	October 15, 1997	48	Bill Wray, Mike Mignola		Dave Stewart	Bill Wray	Hellboy Junior TPB
Hellboy Junior Halloween Special	October 15, 1997	48	Somnambo The Sleeping Giant			Bill Wray	Hellboy Junior TPB
Hellboy Junior Halloween Special	October 15, 1997	48	Bill Wray	Dave Cooper		Bill Wray	Hellboy Junior TPB
Hellboy Junior Halloween Special	October 15, 1997	48	Hellboy Jr. pin-up			Bill Wray	Hellboy Junior TPB
Hellboy Junior Halloween Special	October 15, 1997	48	—	Kevin Nowlan		Bill Wray	Hellboy Junior TPB
Hellboy Junior Halloween Special	October 15, 1997	48	The Devil Don't Smoke			Bill Wray	Hellboy Junior TPB
Hellboy Junior Halloween Special	October 15, 1997	48	Mike Mignola, Bill Wray	Mike Mignola	Bill Wray	Bill Wray	Hellboy Junior TPB
Hellboy Junior #1	October 20, 1999	32	Magical Mushroom Trip			Bill Wray	Hellboy Junior TPB
Hellboy Junior #1	October 20, 1999	32	Bill Wray	Dave Cooper		Bill Wray	Hellboy Junior TPB
Hellboy Junior #1	October 20, 1999	32	The Wolvertons			Bill Wray	Hellboy Junior TPB
Hellboy Junior #1	October 20, 1999	32	Bill Wray	Pat McEown	Bill Wray	Bill Wray	Hellboy Junior TPB
Hellboy Junior #1	October 20, 1999	32	Hellboy Jr. pin-up			Bill Wray	Hellboy Junior TPB
Hellboy Junior #1	October 20, 1999	32	—	Glenn Barr		Bill Wray	Hellboy Junior TPB
Hellboy Junior #1	October 20, 1999	32	Huge Retarded Duck pin-up			Bill Wray	Hellboy Junior TPB
Hellboy Junior #1	October 20, 1999	32	—	Stephen DeStefano		Bill Wray	Hellboy Junior TPB
Hellboy Junior #1	October 20, 1999	32	Squid of Man			Bill Wray	Hellboy Junior TPB
Hellboy Junior #1	October 20, 1999	32	Bill Wray	Mike Mignola	Dave Stewart	Bill Wray	Hellboy Junior TPB
Hellboy Junior #2	November 17, 1999	32	The House of Candy Pain			Hilary Barta	Hellboy Junior TPB
Hellboy Junior #2	November 17, 1999	32	Bill Wray	Hilary Barta	Dave Stewart	Hilary Barta	Hellboy Junior TPB
Hellboy Junior #2	November 17, 1999	32	Sparky Bear			Hilary Barta	Hellboy Junior TPB
Hellboy Junior #2	November 17, 1999	32	Bill Wray			Hilary Barta	Hellboy Junior TPB
Hellboy Junior #2	November 17, 1999	32	Huge Retarded Duck			Hilary Barta	Hellboy Junior TPB
Hellboy Junior #2	November 17, 1999	32	Bill Wray	Stephen DeStefano	Bill Wray	Hilary Barta	Hellboy Junior TPB
Hellboy Junior #2	November 17, 1999	32	Hellboy Jr. Gets a Car			Hilary Barta	Hellboy Junior TPB
Hellboy Junior #2	November 17, 1999	32	Mike Mignola		Dave Stewart	Hilary Barta	Hellboy Junior TPB

=== Hellboy: Weird Tales issues ===
Hellboy: Weird Tales was an anthology series by various guest writers and artists.

Issue	Published	Pages	Story	Art	Colors	Cover	Collections
#1	February 26, 2003	32	Big-Top Hellboy			John Cassaday	Hellboy: Weird Tales Volume 1 TPB; Hellboy: Weird Tales HC/TPB
#1	February 26, 2003	32	John Cassaday		Dan Jackson	John Cassaday	Hellboy: Weird Tales Volume 1 TPB; Hellboy: Weird Tales HC/TPB
#1	February 26, 2003	32	Sugar-Coated Wire feat. Dr. Karl Ruprect Kroenen pin-up			John Cassaday	Hellboy: Weird Tales Volume 1 TPB; Hellboy: Weird Tales HC/TPB
#1	February 26, 2003	32	—	TyRuben Ellingson		John Cassaday	Hellboy: Weird Tales Volume 1 TPB; Hellboy: Weird Tales HC/TPB
#1	February 26, 2003	32	Party Pooper			John Cassaday	Hellboy: Weird Tales Volume 1 TPB; Hellboy: Weird Tales HC/TPB
#1	February 26, 2003	32	Andi Watson			John Cassaday	Hellboy: Weird Tales Volume 1 TPB; Hellboy: Weird Tales HC/TPB
#1	February 26, 2003	32	Children of the Black Mound			John Cassaday	Hellboy: Weird Tales Volume 1 TPB; Hellboy: Weird Tales HC/TPB
#1	February 26, 2003	32	Fabian Nicieza	Stefano Raffaele	Elena Sanjust	John Cassaday	Hellboy: Weird Tales Volume 1 TPB; Hellboy: Weird Tales HC/TPB
#1	February 26, 2003	32	Lobster Johnson in Doc Hollow's Grand Vibro-Destructo Machine Episode 1			John Cassaday	Hellboy: Weird Tales Volume 1 TPB; Hellboy: Weird Tales HC/TPB
#1	February 26, 2003	32	John Cassaday		Dan Jackson	John Cassaday	Hellboy: Weird Tales Volume 1 TPB; Hellboy: Weird Tales HC/TPB
#2	April 23, 2003	32	Lloyd McCay in Flight Risk			Jason Pearson	Hellboy: Weird Tales Volume 1 TPB; Hellboy: Weird Tales HC/TPB
#2	April 23, 2003	32	Joe Casey	Steve Parkhouse		Jason Pearson	Hellboy: Weird Tales Volume 1 TPB; Hellboy: Weird Tales HC/TPB
#2	April 23, 2003	32	Hot			Jason Pearson	Hellboy: Weird Tales Volume 1 TPB; Hellboy: Weird Tales HC/TPB
#2	April 23, 2003	32	Randy Stradley	Seung Kim	Michelle Madsen	Jason Pearson	Hellboy: Weird Tales Volume 1 TPB; Hellboy: Weird Tales HC/TPB
#2	April 23, 2003	32	Curse of the Haunted Doily			Jason Pearson	Hellboy: Weird Tales Volume 1 TPB; Hellboy: Weird Tales HC/TPB
#2	April 23, 2003	32	Mark Ricketts	Eric Wight	Michelle Madsen	Jason Pearson	Hellboy: Weird Tales Volume 1 TPB; Hellboy: Weird Tales HC/TPB
#2	April 23, 2003	32	Midnight Cowboy			Jason Pearson	Hellboy: Weird Tales Volume 1 TPB; Hellboy: Weird Tales HC/TPB
#2	April 23, 2003	32	Eric Powell		Eric Powell, Robin Powell	Jason Pearson	Hellboy: Weird Tales Volume 1 TPB; Hellboy: Weird Tales HC/TPB
#2	April 23, 2003	32	Lobster Johnson in Doc Hollow's Grand Vibro-Destructo Machine Episode 2			Jason Pearson	Hellboy: Weird Tales Volume 1 TPB; Hellboy: Weird Tales HC/TPB
#2	April 23, 2003	32	John Cassaday		Dan Jackson	Jason Pearson	Hellboy: Weird Tales Volume 1 TPB; Hellboy: Weird Tales HC/TPB
#3	June 25, 2003	32	Still Born			Alex Maleev	Hellboy: Weird Tales Volume 1 TPB; Hellboy: Weird Tales HC/TPB
#3	June 25, 2003	32	Matt Hollingsworth, Alex Maleev	Alex Maleev	Matt Hollingsworth	Alex Maleev	Hellboy: Weird Tales Volume 1 TPB; Hellboy: Weird Tales HC/TPB
#3	June 25, 2003	32	Down Time			Alex Maleev	Hellboy: Weird Tales Volume 1 TPB; Hellboy: Weird Tales HC/TPB
#3	June 25, 2003	32	Bob Fingerman			Alex Maleev	Hellboy: Weird Tales Volume 1 TPB; Hellboy: Weird Tales HC/TPB
#3	June 25, 2003	32	Hellboy versus Rasputin pin-up			Alex Maleev	Hellboy: Weird Tales Volume 1 TPB; Hellboy: Weird Tales HC/TPB
#3	June 25, 2003	32	—	Galen Showman		Alex Maleev	Hellboy: Weird Tales Volume 1 TPB; Hellboy: Weird Tales HC/TPB
#3	June 25, 2003	32	Family Story			Alex Maleev	Hellboy: Weird Tales Volume 1 TPB; Hellboy: Weird Tales HC/TPB
#3	June 25, 2003	32	Sara Ryan	Steve Lieber	Jeff Parker	Alex Maleev	Hellboy: Weird Tales Volume 1 TPB; Hellboy: Weird Tales HC/TPB
#3	June 25, 2003	32	Hellboy at the Mountains of Madness pin-up			Alex Maleev	Hellboy: Weird Tales Volume 1 TPB; Hellboy: Weird Tales HC/TPB
#3	June 25, 2003	32	—	William Stout		Alex Maleev	Hellboy: Weird Tales Volume 1 TPB; Hellboy: Weird Tales HC/TPB
#3	June 25, 2003	32	Lobster Johnson in Doc Hollow's Grand Vibro-Destructo Machine Episode 3			Alex Maleev	Hellboy: Weird Tales Volume 1 TPB; Hellboy: Weird Tales HC/TPB
#3	June 25, 2003	32	John Cassaday		Dan Jackson	Alex Maleev	Hellboy: Weird Tales Volume 1 TPB; Hellboy: Weird Tales HC/TPB
#4	August 27, 2003	32	The Dread Within			Leinil Francis Yu	Hellboy: Weird Tales Volume 1 TPB; Hellboy: Weird Tales HC/TPB
#4	August 27, 2003	32	Jason Pearson		Dave Stewart	Leinil Francis Yu	Hellboy: Weird Tales Volume 1 TPB; Hellboy: Weird Tales HC/TPB
#4	August 27, 2003	32	Abe Sapien: Star of the B.P.R.D.			Leinil Francis Yu	Hellboy: Weird Tales Volume 1 TPB; Hellboy: Weird Tales HC/TPB
#4	August 27, 2003	32	John Arcudi	Roger Langridge		Leinil Francis Yu	Hellboy: Weird Tales Volume 1 TPB; Hellboy: Weird Tales HC/TPB
#4	August 27, 2003	32	Haunted			Leinil Francis Yu	Hellboy: Weird Tales Volume 1 TPB; Hellboy: Weird Tales HC/TPB
#4	August 27, 2003	32	Thomas E. Sniegoski	Ovi Nedelecu	Ovi Nedelecu, Michelle Madsen	Leinil Francis Yu	Hellboy: Weird Tales Volume 1 TPB; Hellboy: Weird Tales HC/TPB
#4	August 27, 2003	32	Shred pin-up			Leinil Francis Yu	Hellboy: Weird Tales Volume 1 TPB; Hellboy: Weird Tales HC/TPB
#4	August 27, 2003	32	—	Rick Cortes	Anjin	Leinil Francis Yu	Hellboy: Weird Tales Volume 1 TPB; Hellboy: Weird Tales HC/TPB
#4	August 27, 2003	32	Lobster Johnson in Doc Hollow's Grand Vibro-Destructo Machine Episode 4			Leinil Francis Yu	Hellboy: Weird Tales Volume 1 TPB; Hellboy: Weird Tales HC/TPB
#4	August 27, 2003	32	John Cassaday		Dan Jackson	Leinil Francis Yu	Hellboy: Weird Tales Volume 1 TPB; Hellboy: Weird Tales HC/TPB
#5	October 15, 2003	32	Love is Scarier Than Monsters			J.H. Williams III	Hellboy: Weird Tales Volume 2 TPB; Hellboy: Weird Tales HC/TPB
#5	October 15, 2003	32	J.H. Williams III, Haden Blackman	J.H. Williams III		J.H. Williams III	Hellboy: Weird Tales Volume 2 TPB; Hellboy: Weird Tales HC/TPB
#5	October 15, 2003	32	Cool Your Head			J.H. Williams III	Hellboy: Weird Tales Volume 2 TPB; Hellboy: Weird Tales HC/TPB
#5	October 15, 2003	32	Scott Morse			J.H. Williams III	Hellboy: Weird Tales Volume 2 TPB; Hellboy: Weird Tales HC/TPB
#5	October 15, 2003	32	Shattered			J.H. Williams III	Hellboy: Weird Tales Volume 2 TPB; Hellboy: Weird Tales HC/TPB
#5	October 15, 2003	32	Ron Marz	Jim Starlin	Dave Stewart	J.H. Williams III	Hellboy: Weird Tales Volume 2 TPB; Hellboy: Weird Tales HC/TPB
#5	October 15, 2003	32	pin-up			J.H. Williams III	Hellboy: Weird Tales Volume 2 TPB; Hellboy: Weird Tales HC/TPB
#5	October 15, 2003	32	—	Cameron Stewart		J.H. Williams III	Hellboy: Weird Tales Volume 2 TPB; Hellboy: Weird Tales HC/TPB
#5	October 15, 2003	32	Lobster Johnson in Doc Hollow's Grand Vibro-Destructo Machine Episode 5			J.H. Williams III	Hellboy: Weird Tales Volume 2 TPB; Hellboy: Weird Tales HC/TPB
#5	October 15, 2003	32	John Cassaday		Nick Derington	J.H. Williams III	Hellboy: Weird Tales Volume 2 TPB; Hellboy: Weird Tales HC/TPB
#6	December 10, 2003	32	Command Performance			Frank Cho	Hellboy: Weird Tales Volume 2 TPB; Hellboy: Weird Tales HC/TPB
#6	December 10, 2003	32	Will Pfeifer	P. Craig Russell	Lovern Kindzierski	Frank Cho	Hellboy: Weird Tales Volume 2 TPB; Hellboy: Weird Tales HC/TPB
#6	December 10, 2003	32	Friday			Frank Cho	Hellboy: Weird Tales Volume 2 TPB; Hellboy: Weird Tales HC/TPB
#6	December 10, 2003	32	Doug Petrie	Gene Colan	Dave Stewart	Frank Cho	Hellboy: Weird Tales Volume 2 TPB; Hellboy: Weird Tales HC/TPB
#6	December 10, 2003	32	My Vacation in Hell			Frank Cho	Hellboy: Weird Tales Volume 2 TPB; Hellboy: Weird Tales HC/TPB
#6	December 10, 2003	32	Craig Thompson			Frank Cho	Hellboy: Weird Tales Volume 2 TPB; Hellboy: Weird Tales HC/TPB
#6	December 10, 2003	32	pin-up			Frank Cho	Hellboy: Weird Tales Volume 2 TPB; Hellboy: Weird Tales HC/TPB
#6	December 10, 2003	32	—	Steve Purcell		Frank Cho	Hellboy: Weird Tales Volume 2 TPB; Hellboy: Weird Tales HC/TPB
#6	December 10, 2003	32	Lobster Johnson in Doc Hollow's Grand Vibro-Destructo Machine Episode 6			Frank Cho	Hellboy: Weird Tales Volume 2 TPB; Hellboy: Weird Tales HC/TPB
#6	December 10, 2003	32	John Cassaday		Nick Derington	Frank Cho	Hellboy: Weird Tales Volume 2 TPB; Hellboy: Weird Tales HC/TPB
#7	February 11, 2004	32	A Love Story			Phil Noto	Hellboy: Weird Tales Volume 2 TPB; Hellboy: Weird Tales HC/TPB
#7	February 11, 2004	32	Tommy Lee Edwards			Phil Noto	Hellboy: Weird Tales Volume 2 TPB; Hellboy: Weird Tales HC/TPB
#7	February 11, 2004	32	Theater of the Dead			Phil Noto	Hellboy: Weird Tales Volume 2 TPB; Hellboy: Weird Tales HC/TPB
#7	February 11, 2004	32	Jim Pascoe, Tom Fassbender	Simeon Wilkins	David Self	Phil Noto	Hellboy: Weird Tales Volume 2 TPB; Hellboy: Weird Tales HC/TPB
#7	February 11, 2004	32	Long Distance Caller			Phil Noto	Hellboy: Weird Tales Volume 2 TPB; Hellboy: Weird Tales HC/TPB
#7	February 11, 2004	32	Kev Walker			Phil Noto	Hellboy: Weird Tales Volume 2 TPB; Hellboy: Weird Tales HC/TPB
#7	February 11, 2004	32	pin-up			Phil Noto	Hellboy: Weird Tales Volume 2 TPB; Hellboy: Weird Tales HC/TPB
#7	February 11, 2004	32	—	Dave Stevens	Dave Stewart	Phil Noto	Hellboy: Weird Tales Volume 2 TPB; Hellboy: Weird Tales HC/TPB
#7	February 11, 2004	32	Lobster Johnson in Doc Hollow's Grand Vibro-Destructo Machine Episode 7			Phil Noto	Hellboy: Weird Tales Volume 2 TPB; Hellboy: Weird Tales HC/TPB
#7	February 11, 2004	32	John Cassaday		Nick Derington	Phil Noto	Hellboy: Weird Tales Volume 2 TPB; Hellboy: Weird Tales HC/TPB
#8	April 14, 2004	32	Fifteen Minutes...			Michael Kaluta	Hellboy: Weird Tales Volume 2 TPB; Hellboy: Weird Tales HC/TPB (Toy Soldier not included in TPB)
#8	April 14, 2004	32	Jill Thompson			Michael Kaluta	Hellboy: Weird Tales Volume 2 TPB; Hellboy: Weird Tales HC/TPB (Toy Soldier not included in TPB)
#8	April 14, 2004	32	Toy Soldier			Michael Kaluta	Hellboy: Weird Tales Volume 2 TPB; Hellboy: Weird Tales HC/TPB (Toy Soldier not included in TPB)
#8	April 14, 2004	32	Akira Yoshida, Kia Asamiya	Kia Asamiya	Dave Stewart	Michael Kaluta	Hellboy: Weird Tales Volume 2 TPB; Hellboy: Weird Tales HC/TPB (Toy Soldier not included in TPB)
#8	April 14, 2004	32	Professional Help			Michael Kaluta	Hellboy: Weird Tales Volume 2 TPB; Hellboy: Weird Tales HC/TPB (Toy Soldier not included in TPB)
#8	April 14, 2004	32	Evan Dorkin		Sarah Dyer	Michael Kaluta	Hellboy: Weird Tales Volume 2 TPB; Hellboy: Weird Tales HC/TPB (Toy Soldier not included in TPB)
#8	April 14, 2004	32	pin-up			Michael Kaluta	Hellboy: Weird Tales Volume 2 TPB; Hellboy: Weird Tales HC/TPB (Toy Soldier not included in TPB)
#8	April 14, 2004	32	—	Gary Fields; Michelle Madsen		Michael Kaluta	Hellboy: Weird Tales Volume 2 TPB; Hellboy: Weird Tales HC/TPB (Toy Soldier not included in TPB)
#8	April 14, 2004	32	Lobster Johnson in Doc Hollow's Grand Vibro-Destructo Machine Episode 8			Michael Kaluta	Hellboy: Weird Tales Volume 2 TPB; Hellboy: Weird Tales HC/TPB (Toy Soldier not included in TPB)
#8	April 14, 2004	32	John Cassaday		Nick Derington	Michael Kaluta	Hellboy: Weird Tales Volume 2 TPB; Hellboy: Weird Tales HC/TPB (Toy Soldier not included in TPB)

=== Hellboy Animated comics ===
Stories based in the Hellboy Animated universe.

Volume	Title	Published	Format	Pages	Story	Art	Colors	Cover	ISBN	Collections	Notes
—	Phantom Limbs	October 28, 2006	Saddle stitched	32	Phantom Limbs			Jeff Matsuda	—	—	Comic included with the DVD of Sword of Storms
—	Phantom Limbs	October 28, 2006	Saddle stitched	32	Jim Pascoe	Rick Lacy	Michelle Madsen	Jeff Matsuda	—	—	Comic included with the DVD of Sword of Storms
—	Phantom Limbs	October 28, 2006	Saddle stitched	32	Hellboy pin-up			Jeff Matsuda	—	—	Comic included with the DVD of Sword of Storms
—	Phantom Limbs	October 28, 2006	Saddle stitched	32	—	Mike Mignola	Dave Stewart	Jeff Matsuda	—	—	Comic included with the DVD of Sword of Storms
1	The Black Wedding	January 31, 2007	TPB	80	The Black Wedding			Jeff Matsuda	978-1-59582-757-9	—	
1	The Black Wedding	January 31, 2007	TPB	80	Jim Pascoe	Rick Lacy	Dan Jackson	Jeff Matsuda	978-1-59582-757-9	—	
1	The Black Wedding	January 31, 2007	TPB	80	Hellboy pin-up			Jeff Matsuda	978-1-59582-757-9	—	
1	The Black Wedding	January 31, 2007	TPB	80	—	Mike Mignola	Dave Stewart	Jeff Matsuda	978-1-59582-757-9	—	
1	The Black Wedding	January 31, 2007	TPB	80	Pyramid of Death			Jeff Matsuda	978-1-59582-757-9	—	
1	The Black Wedding	January 31, 2007	TPB	80	Tad Stones	Fabio Laguna	Michelle Madsen	Jeff Matsuda	978-1-59582-757-9	—	
—	The Yearning	May 2007	Saddle stitched	32	The Yearning			Eric Powell	—	—	Comic included with the DVD of Blood & Iron
—	The Yearning	May 2007	Saddle stitched	32	Jim Pascoe	Ben Stenbeck	Michelle Madsen	Eric Powell	—	—	Comic included with the DVD of Blood & Iron
—	The Yearning	May 2007	Saddle stitched	32	Hellboy pin-up			Eric Powell	—	—	Comic included with the DVD of Blood & Iron
—	The Yearning	May 2007	Saddle stitched	32	—	Mike Mignola	Dave Stewart	Eric Powell	—	—	Comic included with the DVD of Blood & Iron
2	The Judgment Bell	June 13, 2007	TPB	80	The Judgment Bell			Eric Powell	978-1-59307-799-0	—	Front cover on some sources shows the title Judgment Bell
2	The Judgment Bell	June 13, 2007	TPB	80	Jim Pascoe	Rick Lacy	Michelle Madsen	Eric Powell	978-1-59307-799-0	—	Front cover on some sources shows the title Judgment Bell
2	The Judgment Bell	June 13, 2007	TPB	80	Young Hellboy pin-up			Eric Powell	978-1-59307-799-0	—	Front cover on some sources shows the title Judgment Bell
2	The Judgment Bell	June 13, 2007	TPB	80	—	Mike Mignola	Dave Stewart	Eric Powell	978-1-59307-799-0	—	Front cover on some sources shows the title Judgment Bell
2	The Judgment Bell	June 13, 2007	TPB	80	The Menace of the Mechanical Monster			Eric Powell	978-1-59307-799-0	—	Front cover on some sources shows the title Judgment Bell
2	The Judgment Bell	June 13, 2007	TPB	80	Tad Stones	Tad Stones	Michelle Madsen	Eric Powell	978-1-59307-799-0	—	Front cover on some sources shows the title Judgment Bell
3	The Menagerie	December 05, 2007	TPB	80	The Menagerie			Humberto Ramos	978-1-59307-861-4	—	
3	The Menagerie	December 05, 2007	TPB	80	Jason Hall	Rick Lacy	Michelle Madsen	Humberto Ramos	978-1-59307-861-4	—	
3	The Menagerie	December 05, 2007	TPB	80	Hellboy pin-up			Humberto Ramos	978-1-59307-861-4	—	
3	The Menagerie	December 05, 2007	TPB	80	—	Rick Lacy	Michelle Madsen	Humberto Ramos	978-1-59307-861-4	—	
3	The Menagerie	December 05, 2007	TPB	80	Small Victories			Humberto Ramos	978-1-59307-861-4	—	
3	The Menagerie	December 05, 2007	TPB	80	Nate Piekos	Fabio Laguna	Michelle Madsen	Humberto Ramos	978-1-59307-861-4	—	

=== Itty Bitty Hellboy issues ===
Title	Published	Pages	Story	Art	Colors	Cover	Collections	Notes
Itty Bitty Hellboy	PART 1: August 28, 2013 "#1 FOR $1": April 02, 2014	32	Art Baltazar, Franco	Art Baltazar	Art Baltazar	Art Baltazar	Itty Bitty Hellboy TPB	
Itty Bitty Hellboy	PART 2: September 25, 2013	32	Art Baltazar, Franco	Art Baltazar	Art Baltazar	Art Baltazar	Itty Bitty Hellboy TPB	
Itty Bitty Hellboy	PART 3: October 30, 2013	32	Art Baltazar, Franco	Art Baltazar	Art Baltazar	Art Baltazar	Itty Bitty Hellboy TPB	
Itty Bitty Hellboy	PART 4: November 27, 2013	32	Art Baltazar, Franco	Art Baltazar	Art Baltazar	Art Baltazar	Itty Bitty Hellboy TPB	
Itty Bitty Hellboy	PART 5: December 18, 2013	32	Art Baltazar, Franco	Art Baltazar	Art Baltazar	Art Baltazar	Itty Bitty Hellboy TPB	
Halloween ComicFest 2013: Itty Bitty Hellboy	October 2013	16	Art Baltazar, Franco	Art Baltazar	Art Baltazar	Art Baltazar	—	Reprint of comics from Itty Bitty Hellboy #1
Itty Bitty Hellboy: The Search for the Were-Jaguar!	PART 1: November 25, 2015	32	Art Baltazar, Franco	Art Baltazar	Art Baltazar	Art Baltazar	Itty Bitty Hellboy: The Search for the Were-Jaguar! TPB	
Itty Bitty Hellboy: The Search for the Were-Jaguar!	PART 2: December 23, 2015	32	Art Baltazar, Franco	Art Baltazar	Art Baltazar	Art Baltazar	Itty Bitty Hellboy: The Search for the Were-Jaguar! TPB	
Itty Bitty Hellboy: The Search for the Were-Jaguar!	PART 3: January 27, 2016	32	Art Baltazar, Franco	Art Baltazar	Art Baltazar	Art Baltazar	Itty Bitty Hellboy: The Search for the Were-Jaguar! TPB	
Itty Bitty Hellboy: The Search for the Were-Jaguar!	PART 4: February 24, 2016	32	Art Baltazar, Franco	Art Baltazar	Art Baltazar	Art Baltazar	Itty Bitty Hellboy: The Search for the Were-Jaguar! TPB	

=== Non-canon stories in other publications ===
Non-canon stories originally published in other publications, including original stories in Hellboy Universe collections. If a story was re-printed in a regular issue later, only that issue is mentioned in the column Collections; for other collections, see the entry of the regular issue.

Story title	Publication	Issue	Published	Format	Pages	Pages (story)	Story	Art	Colors	Cover	ISBN	Collections	Notes
Hell Boy	Great Salt Lake Comic Convention '91	—	August 1991	Saddle stitched	?	1	—	Mike Mignola	b/w	?	—	The Art of Hellboy HC/TPB; Hellboy: The First 20 Years HC	First use of the character name on a demon's belt buckle
Hellboy/Nathan Never	Dime Press	#4	May 1993	?	82	1	—	Mike Mignola, Nicola Mari	?	Mike Mignola, Nicola Mari	—	—	Hellboy prototype fighting Nathan Never on the cover of an Italian fanzine
Hi, My Name's Hellboy	Celebrate Diversity Collector's Edition	October 1994	October 1994	Saddle stitched	32	1	Mike Mignola	Mike Mignola	b/w	Various	—	The Art of Hellboy HC/TPB	One-page panel ad in a Diamond Comic Distributors catalog supplement
Hellboy: The Astromagnet	Hellboy Sourcebook and Roleplaying Game	—	August 2002	HC/TPB	208	2	Mike Mignola, Jai Nitz, Philip Reed	Zach Howard	Peter Bergting, Philip Reed	Mike Mignola	HARDCOVER: 1-55634-684-0; TRADE PAPERBACK: 1-55634-654-9	—	
Hellboy: The Kabandha	Hellboy Sourcebook and Roleplaying Game	—	August 2002	HC/TPB	208	6	Jai Nitz, Philip Reed	Peter Bergting	Alex Fernandez	Mike Mignola	HARDCOVER: 1-55634-684-0; TRADE PAPERBACK: 1-55634-654-9	—	
Hellboy Jr. vs. Hitler	Hellboy Junior TPB		January 21, 2004	TPB	120	16	Bill Wray	Bill Wray	Art Baltazar	Dave Stewart	978-1-56971-988-6	—	
Itty Bitty Hellboy: The Chained Coughin'	Free Comic Book Day 2014: All Ages	—	May 03, 2014	Saddle stitched	32	2	Art Baltazar, Franco	Art Baltazar	Art Baltazar	Faith Erin Hicks	—	—	

=== Other non-canon comics ===
Title	Published	Format	Pages	Story	Art	Colors	Cover	Collections	Notes
Hellboy: The Golden Army	February 20, 2008	Saddle stitched	16	STORY: Guillermo del Toro, Mike Mignola; SCRIPT: Mike Mignola	Francisco Ruiz Velasco		—	3 photo variant covers	Promotional comic for the 2008 movie Hellboy II: The Golden Army

=== Non-canon collections ===
Title	Collects	Published	Format	Pages	Cover	ISBN
Hellboy: Weird Tales Volume 1	Hellboy: Weird Tales #1–#4; Sketchbook; Art gallery	December 17, 2003	TPB	128	Mike Mignola	978-1-56971-622-9
Hellboy Junior	Hellboy Junior Halloween Special; Hellboy Junior #1–#2; Hellboy Jr. vs. Hitler (original short story); Sketchbook	January 21, 2004	TPB	120	Bill Wray	978-1-56971-988-6
Hellboy: Weird Tales Volume 2	Hellboy: Weird Tales #5–#8; Sketchbook; Art gallery	October 27, 2004	TPB	144	Mike Mignola	978-1-56971-953-4
Itty Bitty Hellboy	Itty Bitty Hellboy #1–#5	April 16, 2014	TPB	128	Art Baltazar	978-1-61655-414-9
Itty Bitty Hellboy: The Search for the Were-Jaguar!	Itty Bitty Hellboy: The Search for the Were-Jaguar! #1–#4	May 18, 2016	TPB	104	Art Baltazar	978-1-61655-801-7

=== Non-canon omnibus editions ===
Omnibus editions collecting multiple trade paperbacks.

Title	Collects	Published	Format	Pages	Cover	ISBN	Notes
Hellboy: Weird Tales	Introduction by Scott Allie; Hellboy: Weird Tales Volume 1 TPB; Hellboy: Weird Tales Volume 2 TPB; How Koshchei Became Deathless (short story from Hellboy: The Wild Hunt #2–#3); Baba Yaga's Feast (short story from Hellboy: The Wild Hunt #4); Gallery (16 pages)	November 26, 2014	HC	256	Mike Mignola	978-1-61655-510-8	
Hellboy: Weird Tales	Introduction by Scott Allie; Hellboy: Weird Tales Volume 1 TPB; Hellboy: Weird Tales Volume 2 TPB; How Koshchei Became Deathless (short story from Hellboy: The Wild Hunt #2–#3); Baba Yaga's Feast (short story from Hellboy: The Wild Hunt #4); Gallery (16 pages)	November 9, 2022	TPB	248	Mike Mignola	978-1-5067-3384-5	Without story Toy Soldier and introduction by Scott Allie

== Non-Hellboy Universe stories ==
Mike Mignola's creation has starred in many other artists' comics. These are all non-canon stories.

=== Non-Hellboy Universe issues ===
Title	Publisher	Published	Pages	Story	Art	Colors	Cover	Collections	Notes
John Byrne's Next Men #14	Dark Horse Comics	April 10, 1993	32	John Byrne	John Byrne	Matt Webb	John Byrne	John Byrne's Next Men Volume 3: Fame TPB	Cameo by Hellboy on a poster in the background
John Byrne's Next Men #21	Dark Horse Comics	December 10, 1993	32	John Byrne	PAGES 1–11, 22–24: John Byrne; PAGES 12–21: Mike Mignola	Matt Webb	Mike Mignola	John Byrne's Next Men Volume 4: Faith TPB	Guest appearance by Hellboy; first appearance in a full-color comic story
Danger Unlimited #4	Dark Horse Comics	May 1994	32	John Byrne	John Byrne	Matt Webb	PENCILS: John Byrne; INKS: Gary Cody	Danger Unlimited TPC/HC (Dark Horse 1995); Danger Unlimited TPB (IDW 2009)	Cameo by Hellboy
Madman Comics #5	Dark Horse Comics	January 1995	32	Mike Allred	Mike Allred	Laura Allred	Mike Allred	Madman Comics: Yearbook '95 TPB; Madman Gargantua! HC; Madman Volume 2 TPB; Madman Library Edition Volume 1 HC; Madman Omnibus Volume 1 TPB	Major cameo by Hellboy
Babe 2 #2	Dark Horse Comics	April 1995	32	John Byrne	John Byrne	Matt Webb	John Byrne	Danger Unlimited TPB (IDW 2009)	Major cameo by Abe Sapien
Shi/Cyblade: The Battle For Independents	Crusade Comics	September 1995; TUCCI VARIANT COVER: September 1995	32	Billy Tucci, Gary Cohn, Jeff Smith, Brian David-Marshall	PENCILS: Billy Tucci, Stephen R. Bissette, B. C. Boyer, Evan Dorkin, Poly Feliciano, Terry Moore, Andy Orjuela, Joe Quesada, Nelson DeCastro, Marc Sasso, Rob Schrab, Don Simpson, Jeff Smith, David Mack; INKS: Nelson Asencio, Jimmy Palmiotti	J. D. Smith	PENCILS: Marc Silvestri; INKS: Matt Banning; VARIANT PENCILS: Billy Tucci; VARIANT INKS: Nelson Asencio	—	Small cameo by Hellboy
Ghost/Hellboy Special	Dark Horse Comics	PART 1: May 1996	32	Mike Mignola	PENCILS: Scott Benefiel; INKS: Jasen Rodriguez	Pamela Rambo	Mike Mignola	Ghost/Hellboy Special TPB; Hellboy: Masks and Monsters TPB	Ghost/Hellboy crossover
Ghost/Hellboy Special	Dark Horse Comics	PART 2: June 1996	32	Mike Mignola	PENCILS: Scott Benefiel; INKS: Jasen Rodriguez	Pamela Rambo	Mike Mignola	Ghost/Hellboy Special TPB; Hellboy: Masks and Monsters TPB	Ghost/Hellboy crossover
Body Bags #1	Dark Horse Comics	September 1996	32	Jason Pearson		Digital Chameleon	Michael Golden	Body Bags: Father's Day TPB	Brief cameo by Hellboy and Abe Sapien in disguise
Gen¹³ #13C	Image Comics	November 13, 1996; CHRISTMAS VARIANT COVER: November 20, 1996	16	Brandon Choi, J. Scott Campbell, Jim Lee	PENCILS: J. Scott Campbell; INKS: Alex Garner, Richard Friend, Tom McWeeney, Edwin Rosell, Pete Guzman	Joe Chiodo, Martin Jimenez	PENCILS: J. Scott Campbell; INKS: Alex Garner; CHRISTMAS VARIANT PENCILS: J. Scott Campbell; CHRISTMAS VARIANT INKS: Alex Garner	Gen¹³ #13ABC Special Edition; Gen¹³ #13 A, B & C Collected Edition TPB; Gen¹³ Archives TPB	Guest appearance by Hellboy
Savage Dragon	Image Comics	#34; November 30, 1996	32	Erik Larsen, Mike Mignola	Erik Larsen	Reuben Rude, Abel Mouton, Bill Zindel, Lea Rude, John Zaia, José Arenas	Erik Larsen	Savage Dragon/Hellboy TPB; Savage Dragon Vol. 8: Terminated TPB; Savage Dragon Archives Vol. 2 TPB; Savage Dragon Ultimate Collection Vol. 3 HC	Savage Dragon/Hellboy crossover
Savage Dragon	Image Comics	#35; January 31, 1997	32	Erik Larsen, Mike Mignola	Erik Larsen	Reuben Rude, Abel Mouton, Bill Zindel, Lea Rude, John Zaia, José Arenas	Erik Larsen	Savage Dragon/Hellboy TPB; Savage Dragon Vol. 8: Terminated TPB; Savage Dragon Archives Vol. 2 TPB; Savage Dragon Ultimate Collection Vol. 3 HC	Savage Dragon/Hellboy crossover
The Heretic #4	Dark Horse Comics	March 1997	32	Joe Phillips	PENCILS: Joe Phillips; INKS: Dexter Vines	Bad@$$ Studio	Joe Phillips	The Heretic TPB	Cameo by Hellboy and Abe Sapien
Savage Dragon	Image Comics	#41; August 31, 1997	32	Erik Larsen	Erik Larsen	Reuben Rude, Abel Mouton, Bill Zindel, Lea Rude, José Arenas	Erik Larsen	Savage Dragon Vol. 9: Worlds at War TPB; Savage Dragon Archives Vol. 2 TPB	Cameo by Hellboy
Savage Dragon	Image Comics	#51; June 30, 1998	32	Erik Larsen	Erik Larsen	Reuben Rude, Abel Mouton, Bill Zindel, Lea Rude	Erik Larsen	Savage Dragon Vol. 10: Endgame TPB; Savage Dragon Archives Vol. 3 TPB	Cameo by Hellboy
Painkiller Jane/Hellboy	Event Comics	September 30, 1998; MIGNOLA VARIANT COVER: September 30, 1998	32	Brian Augustyn	PENCILS: Rick Leonardi; INKS: Jimmy Palmiotti	Elizabeth Lewis, Snakebite Cortez	PENCILS: Joe Quesada; INKS: Jimmy Palmiotti; VARIANT: Mike Mignola	—	Painkiller Jane/Hellboy crossover
Batman/Hellboy/Starman	DC Comics	PART 1: November 25, 1998	32	James Robinson	Mike Mignola	Matt Hollingsworth	Mike Mignola	Hellboy: Masks and Monsters TPB; Starman Omnibus Volume 4 HC; DC/Dark Horse: Justice League Volume 1 TPB	Batman/Hellboy/Starman crossover
Batman/Hellboy/Starman	DC Comics	PART 2: December 30, 1998	32	James Robinson	Mike Mignola	Matt Hollingsworth	Tony Harris	Hellboy: Masks and Monsters TPB; Starman Omnibus Volume 4 HC; DC/Dark Horse: Justice League Volume 1 TPB	Batman/Hellboy/Starman crossover
Sin City: Hell and Back #7	Dark Horse Comics	January 19, 2000	32	Frank Miller		Lynn Varley	Frank Miller	Sin City: Hell and Back TPB; Frank Miller's Sin City Library Set 2 HC; Frank Miller's Sin City Volume 7: Hell and Back Deluxe Edition HC	Brief appearance by Hellboy in a hallucination
The Goon #7	Dark Horse Comics	June 23, 2004	32	Eric Powell, Mike Mignola	PAGES 1–3, 26: Mike Mignola; PAGES 4–25: Eric Powell	PAGES 1–3, 26: Dave Stewart; PAGES 4–25: Eric Powell, Ben Cocke, Barry Gregory, Robin Powell	Mike Mignola	The Goon Vol. 3: Heaps of Ruination TPB; The Goon Library Volume 1 HC; The Goon: A Bunch of Old Crap – An Omnibus Volume 1 TPB	Goon/Hellboy crossover
Beasts of Burden/Hellboy: Sacrifice	Dark Horse Comics	October 27, 2010; MIGNOLA VARIANT COVER: October 27, 2010	32	Mike Mignola, Evan Dorkin	Jill Thompson		Jill Thompson; VARIANT: Mike Mignola	Beasts of Burden Volume 2: Neigborhood Watch HC; Beasts of Burden Omnibus TPB	Beasts of Burden/Hellboy crossover
Criminal Macabre/The Goon: When Freaks Collide	Dark Horse Comics	July 20, 2011; POWELL VARIANT COVER: July 20, 2011	32	Steve Niles, Eric Powell	Christopher Mitten	Michelle Madsen	Fiona Staples; VARIANT: Eric Powell	Criminal Macabre: No Peace for Dead Men TPB; Criminal Macabre: Omnibus Volume 3 TPB	Cameo by Hellboy
Archie vs. Predator #1	Dark Horse Comics	April 15, 2015; POWELL VARIANT COVER: April 15, 2015; FRANCAVILLA VARIANT COVER: April 15, 2015	32	Archie vs. Predator: When You Wish Upon a Star			PENCILS: Fernando Ruiz; INKS: Rich Koslowski; VARIANT: Eric Powell; VARIANT: Francesco Francavilla	Archie vs. Predator HC/TPB	
Archie vs. Predator #1	Dark Horse Comics	April 15, 2015; POWELL VARIANT COVER: April 15, 2015; FRANCAVILLA VARIANT COVER: April 15, 2015	32	Alex de Campi	PENCILS: Fernando Ruiz; INKS: Rich Koslowski	Jason Millet	PENCILS: Fernando Ruiz; INKS: Rich Koslowski; VARIANT: Eric Powell; VARIANT: Francesco Francavilla	Archie vs. Predator HC/TPB	
Archie vs. Predator #1	Dark Horse Comics	April 15, 2015; POWELL VARIANT COVER: April 15, 2015; FRANCAVILLA VARIANT COVER: April 15, 2015	32	Sabrina Meets Hellboy			PENCILS: Fernando Ruiz; INKS: Rich Koslowski; VARIANT: Eric Powell; VARIANT: Francesco Francavilla	Archie vs. Predator HC/TPB	Sabrina/Hellboy crossover (1-page story)
Archie vs. Predator #1	Dark Horse Comics	April 15, 2015; POWELL VARIANT COVER: April 15, 2015; FRANCAVILLA VARIANT COVER: April 15, 2015	32	Alex de Campi	Robert Hack		PENCILS: Fernando Ruiz; INKS: Rich Koslowski; VARIANT: Eric Powell; VARIANT: Francesco Francavilla	Archie vs. Predator HC/TPB	Sabrina/Hellboy crossover (1-page story)
3-D Cowboy's Cosmic Convict Challenge(rs)	Challengers Comics + Conversation	May 7, 2016	24	Ryan Browne, Mike Norton, Tim Seeley, Luke Smarto				—	Guest appearance by Hellboy; only available at the Challengers Comics + Conversation comic book store in Chicago
Fearless Dawn meets Hellboy	Albatross Funny Books	June 17, 2020; LTD. ED. CARD STOCK VARIANT COVER: June 17, 2020	32	Mike Mignola, Steve Mannion	PAGES 1–3, 28: Mike Mignola; PAGES 4–27: Steve Mannion	Dave Stewart	Steve Mannion; LTD. ED. CARD STOCK VARIANT: Mike Mignola	—	Fearless Dawn/Hellboy Crossover

=== Non-Hellboy Universe collections ===
Column Collects shows only content relevant to the Hellboy Universe.

Title	Collects	Publisher	Published	Format	Pages	Cover	ISBN	Notes
John Byrne's Next Men, Volume 3: Fame	John Byrne's Next Men #14	Dark Horse Comics	November 1994	TPB	160	Gary Cody	978-1-56971-025-8	Cameo by Hellboy on a poster in the background
John Byrne's Next Men, Volume 4: Faith	John Byrne's Next Men #21	Dark Horse Comics	February 1995	TPB	112	Gary Cody	978-1-56971-055-5	Guest appearance by Hellboy; first appearance in a full-color comic story
Danger Unlimited	Danger Unlimited #4	Dark Horse Comics	April 25, 1995	TPB	112	John Byrne	978-1-56971-058-6	Cameo by Hellboy
Danger Unlimited	Danger Unlimited #4	Dark Horse Comics	August 1995	HC	112	John Byrne	978-1-56971-111-8	Cameo by Hellboy
Madman Comics: Yearbook '95	Madman Comics #5	Dark Horse Comics	January 1996	TPB	160	Mike Allred	978-1-56971-091-3	Major cameo by Hellboy
Gen¹³ #13ABC Special Edition	Gen¹³ #13C	Image Comics	October 1996	Saddle stitched	40	PENCILS: J. Scott Campbell; INKS: Alex Garner	—	Guest appearance by Hellboy; mail order issue published with the Wizard magazine Jim Lee Tribute Edition
Ghost/Hellboy Special	Ghost/Hellboy Special #1–#2	Dark Horse Comics	June 25, 1997	TPB	48	Mike Mignola	978-1-56971-273-3	Ghost/Hellboy crossover
Body Bags: Father's Day	Body Bags #1	Dark Horse Comics	August 20, 1997	TPB	104	Jason Pearson, Michael Golden	978-1-56971-268-9	Brief cameo by Hellboy and Abe Sapien in disguise
Gen¹³ #13 A, B & C Collected Edition	Gen¹³ #13C	Image Comics	November 5, 1997	TPB	48	PENCILS: J. Scott Campbell; INKS: Sandra Hope	1-887279-66-0	Guest appearance by Hellboy
Gen¹³ Archives	Gen¹³ #13C	Image Comics	August 28, 1998	TPB	528	?	1-887279-91-1	Guest appearance by Hellboy
Sin City: Hell and Back	Sin City: Hell and Back #7	Dark Horse Comics	FIRST EDITION					Brief appearance by Hellboy in a hallucination
Sin City: Hell and Back	Sin City: Hell and Back #7	Dark Horse Comics	December 20, 2000	TPB	312	Frank Miller	978-1-56971-481-2	Brief appearance by Hellboy in a hallucination
Sin City: Hell and Back	Sin City: Hell and Back #7	Dark Horse Comics	SECOND EDITION					Brief appearance by Hellboy in a hallucination
Sin City: Hell and Back	Sin City: Hell and Back #7	Dark Horse Comics	April 6, 2005	TPB	320	Frank Miller	978-1-59307-299-5	Brief appearance by Hellboy in a hallucination
Sin City: Hell and Back	Sin City: Hell and Back #7	Dark Horse Comics	THIRD EDITION					Brief appearance by Hellboy in a hallucination
Sin City: Hell and Back	Sin City: Hell and Back #7	Dark Horse Comics	December 1, 2010	TPB	320	Frank Miller	978-1-59307-299-5	Brief appearance by Hellboy in a hallucination
Sin City: Hell and Back	Sin City: Hell and Back #7	Dark Horse Comics	FOURTH EDITION					Brief appearance by Hellboy in a hallucination
Sin City: Hell and Back	Sin City: Hell and Back #7	Dark Horse Comics	November 2, 2022	TPB	328	Frank Miller	978-1-5067-2288-7	Brief appearance by Hellboy in a hallucination
Savage Dragon/Hellboy: The Collected Edition	Savage Dragon #34–#35	Image Comics	November 6, 2002	TPB	48	Mike Mignola	—	Savage Dragon/Hellboy crossover
Savage Dragon Vol. 8: Terminated	Savage Dragon #34–#35	Image Comics	December 17, 2003	TPB	176	Erik Larsen	978-1-58240-336-6	Savage Dragon/Hellboy crossover
Savage Dragon Vol. 9: Worlds at War	Savage Dragon #41	Image Comics	February 18, 2004	TPB	144	Erik Larsen	978-1-58240-324-3	Cameo by Hellboy
Savage Dragon Vol. 10: End Game	Savage Dragon #51	Image Comics	May 26, 2004	TPB	144	Erik Larsen	978-1-58240-346-5	Cameo by Hellboy
The Goon Vol. 3: Heaps of Ruination	The Goon #7	Dark Horse Comics	FIRST EDITION					Goon/Hellboy crossover
The Goon Vol. 3: Heaps of Ruination	The Goon #7	Dark Horse Comics	February 23, 2005	TPB	120	Eric Powell	978-1-59307-292-6	Goon/Hellboy crossover
The Goon Vol. 3: Heaps of Ruination	The Goon #7	Dark Horse Comics	SECOND EDITION					Goon/Hellboy crossover
The Goon Vol. 3: Heaps of Ruination	The Goon #7	Dark Horse Comics	August 31, 2011	TPB	128	Eric Powell	978-1-59582-625-1	Goon/Hellboy crossover
Frank Miller's Sin City Library Set 2	Sin City: Hell and Back #7	Dark Horse Comics	June 7, 2006	4 Oversize HC in slipcase	736	Frank Miller	978-1-59307-422-7	Brief appearance by Hellboy in a hallucination
Savage Dragon Archives Vol. 2	Savage Dragon #34–#35, #41	Image Comics	July 5, 2007	TPB (b/w)	660	Erik Larsen	978-1-58240-737-1	Savage Dragon/Hellboy crossover, cameo by Hellboy
Madman Gargantua!	Madman Comics #5	Image Comics	July 11, 2007	HC	852	Mike Allred	978-1-58240-740-1	Major cameo by Hellboy
Madman Volume 2	Madman Comics #5	Image Comics	November 21, 2007	TPB	456	Mike Allred	978-1-58240-811-8	Major cameo by Hellboy
The Heretic	The Heretic #4	IDW Publishing	November 5, 2008	TPB	104	Joe Phillips	978-1-60010-316-2	Cameo by Hellboy and Abe Sapien
Danger Unlimited	Danger Unlimited #4; Babe 2 #2	IDW Publishing	March 4, 2009}	TPB	224	John Byrne	978-1-60010-363-6	Cameo by Hellboy, major cameo by Abe Sapien
Hellboy: Masks and Monsters	Batman/Hellboy/Starman #1–#2; Ghost/Hellboy Special #1–#2; Sketchbook	Dark Horse Comics	October 13, 2010	TPB	136	Mike Mignola	978-1-59582-567-4	Batman/Hellboy/Starman crossover, Ghost/Hellboy crossover
Starman Omnibus Volume 4	Batman/Hellboy/Starman #1–#2	DC Comics	February 17, 2010	HC	432	Tony Harris	978-1-4012-2596-4	Batman/Hellboy/Starman crossover
Criminal Macabre: No Peace for Dead Men	Criminal Macabre/The Goon: When Freaks Collide	Dark Horse Comics	May 8, 2013	TPB	144	Fiona Staples	978-1-61655-137-7	Cameo by Hellboy
Savage Dragon Archives Vol. 3	Savage Dragon #51	Image Comics	January 16, 2014	TPB (b/w)	554	Erik Larsen	978-1-58240-770-8	Cameo by Hellboy
Criminal Macabre: Omnibus Volume 3	Criminal Macabre/The Goon: When Freaks Collide	Dark Horse Comics	June 10, 2015	TPB	368	Justin Erickson	978-1-61655-648-8	Cameo by Hellboy
Archie vs. Predator	Sabrina Meets Hellboy (1-page story from Archie vs. Predator #1)	Dark Horse Comics	November 4, 2015	HC	128	PENCILS: Fernando Ruiz; INKS: Rich Koslowski	978-1-61655-805-5	Sabrina/Hellboy crossover
Archie vs. Predator	Sabrina Meets Hellboy (1-page story from Archie vs. Predator #1)	Dark Horse Comics	August 21, 2019	TPB	104	PENCILS: Fernando Ruiz; INKS: Rich Koslowski	978-1-5067-1466-0	Sabrina/Hellboy crossover
The Goon Library Volume 1	The Goon #7	Dark Horse Comics	November 11, 2015	Oversize HC	496	Eric Powell	978-1-61655-842-0	Goon/Hellboy crossover
DC/Dark Horse: Justice League Volume 1	Batman/Hellboy/Starman #1–#2	DC Comics	November 9, 2016	TPB	408	Mike Mignola	978-1-4012-7009-4	Batman/Hellboy/Starman crossover
The Goon: A Bunch of Old Crap – An Omnibus Volume 1	The Goon #7	Dark Horse Comics	FIRST EDITION					Goon/Hellboy crossover
The Goon: A Bunch of Old Crap – An Omnibus Volume 1	The Goon #7	Dark Horse Comics	June 11, 2019	TPB	496	Eric Powell	978-0-9983792-9-6	Goon/Hellboy crossover
The Goon: A Bunch of Old Crap – An Omnibus Volume 1	The Goon #7	Dark Horse Comics	SECOND EDITION					Goon/Hellboy crossover
The Goon: A Bunch of Old Crap – An Omnibus Volume 1	The Goon #7	Dark Horse Comics	November 5, 2024	TPB	496	Eric Powell	978-1-5067-4687-6	Goon/Hellboy crossover
Beasts of Burden Volume 2: Neighborhood Watch	Beasts of Burden/Hellboy: Sacrifice	Dark Horse Comics	September 18, 2019	HC	160	Jill Thompson	978-1-5067-1410-3	Beasts of Burden/Hellboy crossover
Madman Library Edition Volume 1	Madman Comics #5	Dark Horse Comics	June 16, 2021	Oversize HC	680	Mike Allred	978-1-5067-2244-3	Major cameo by Hellboy
Frank Miller's Sin City Volume 7: Hell and Back Deluxe Edition	Sin City: Hell and Back #7	Dark Horse Comics	November 2, 2022	Oversize HC in a slipcase	328	Frank Miller	978-1-5067-2843-8	Brief appearance by Hellboy in a hallucination
Beasts of Burden Omnibus	Beasts of Burden/Hellboy: Sacrifice	Dark Horse Comics	February 18, 2025	TPB	576	Jill Thompson	978-1-5067-4678-4	
Savage Dragon Ultimate Collection Vol. 3	Savage Dragon #34–#35	Image Comics	March 5, 2025	HC	400	Erik Larsen	978-1-5343-5638-2	Savage Dragon/Hellboy crossover
Madman Omnibus Volume 1	Madman Comics #5	Dark Horse Comics	Announced for: July 1, 2025	TPB	680	Mike Allred	978-1-5067-3807-9	Major cameo by Hellboy

== Prose stories ==
Novels, illustrated novels, anthologies, audiobooks and other prose stories in the Hellboy Universe are included here as some of them are considered canon.

=== Prose stories (print) ===
Title	Story	Art	Colors	Publisher	Published	Format	Pages	Cover	ISBN	Notes
Hellboy: The Lost Army	Christopher Golden	Mike Mignola	b/w	Dark Horse Comics	June 1, 1997	TPB	288	Mike Mignola	978-1-56971-185-9	
Hellboy: Odd Jobs	Christopher Golden, Mike Mignola, Yvonne Navarro, Stephen R. Bissette, Philip Nutman, Greg Rucka, Nancy Holder, Craig Shaw Gardner, Nancy A. Collins, Rick Hautala, Jim Connolly, Chet Williamson, Max Allan Collins, Matthew J. Costello, Poppy Z. Brite, Brian Hodge	Mike Mignola, Gahan Wilson	b/w	Dark Horse Comics	December 15, 1999	TPB	216	Mike Mignola	978-1-56971-440-9	Anthology edited by Christopher Golden
Hellboy: The Bones of Giants	Christopher Golden	Mike Mignola	b/w	PAPERBACK						
Hellboy: The Bones of Giants	Christopher Golden	Mike Mignola	b/w	Dark Horse Comics	December 5, 2001	TPB	200	Mike Mignola	978-1-56971-610-6	
Hellboy: The Bones of Giants	Christopher Golden	Mike Mignola	b/w	MASS MARKET PAPERBACK						
Hellboy: The Bones of Giants	Christopher Golden	Mike Mignola	b/w	Pocket Star Books	February 2004	TPB	368	Mike Mignola	978-0-7434-6283-9	
Hellboy	Yvonne Navarro	—	—	Pocket Star Books	March 2004	TPB	304	photo cover	978-0-7434-9289-8	Novelization of the 2004 movie Hellboy
Hellboy: Odder Jobs	Frank Darabont, Peter Crowther, Scott Allie, Charles de Lint, David J. Schow, James L. Cambias, Ed Gorman, Richard Dean Starr, Tom Piccirilli, Nancy Kilpatrick, Sharyn McCrumb, Thomas E. Sniegoski, Graham Joyce, James A. Moore, Ray Garton, Tim Lebbon, Guillermo del Toro, Matthew Robbins	Mike Mignola	b/w	Dark Horse Comics	October 6, 2004	TPB	216	Mike Mignola	978-1-59307-226-1	Anthology edited by Christopher Golden
Hellboy: On Earth As It Is In Hell	Brian Hodge	—	—	MASS MARKET PAPERBACK						
Hellboy: On Earth As It Is In Hell	Brian Hodge	—	—	Pocket Star Books	October 2005	TPB	368	Mike Mignola	978-1-4165-0782-6	
Hellboy: On Earth As It Is In Hell	Brian Hodge	—	—	SCIENCE FICTION BOOK CLUB EXCLUSIVE EDITION						
Hellboy: On Earth As It Is In Hell	Brian Hodge	—	—	Pocket Star Books	October 2005	HC	368	Mike Mignola	978-0-7394-6265-2	
Hellboy: On Earth As It Is In Hell	Brian Hodge	—	—	PAPERBACK						
Hellboy: On Earth As It Is In Hell	Brian Hodge	—	—	Gallery Books	March 13, 2012	TPB	368	Mike Mignola	978-1-4516-6898-8	
Hellboy: Unnatural Selection	Tim Lebbon	—	—	MASS MARKET PAPERBACK						
Hellboy: Unnatural Selection	Tim Lebbon	—	—	Pocket Star Books	April 2006	TPB	320	Mike Mignola	978-1-4165-0783-3	
Hellboy: Unnatural Selection	Tim Lebbon	—	—	PAPERBACK						
Hellboy: Unnatural Selection	Tim Lebbon	—	—	Gallery Books	November 5, 2011	TPB	320	Mike Mignola	978-1-4516-6041-8	
Hellboy: The God Machine	Thomas E. Sniegoski	—	—	MASS MARKET PAPERBACK						
Hellboy: The God Machine	Thomas E. Sniegoski	—	—	Pocket Star Books	August 2006	TPB	368	Mike Mignola	978-1-4165-0784-0	
Hellboy: The God Machine	Thomas E. Sniegoski	—	—	PAPERBACK						
Hellboy: The God Machine	Thomas E. Sniegoski	—	—	Gallery Books	December 1, 2006	TPB	368	Mike Mignola	978-1-4165-4743-3	
Hellboy: The Dragon Pool	Christopher Golden	—	—	MASS MARKET PAPERBACK						
Hellboy: The Dragon Pool	Christopher Golden	—	—	Pocket Star Books	April 2007	TPB	368	Mike Mignola	978-1-4165-0785-7	
Hellboy: The Dragon Pool	Christopher Golden	—	—	PAPERBACK						
Hellboy: The Dragon Pool	Christopher Golden	—	—	Gallery Books	September 10, 2011	TPB	368	Mike Mignola	978-1-4516-6648-9	
Hellboy: Emerald Hell	Tom Piccirilli	—	—	Dark Horse Comics	February 13, 2008	TPB	256	Mike Mignola	978-1-59582-141-6	
Hellboy II: The Golden Army	Robert Greenberger	—	—	Dark Horse Comics	June 18, 2008	TPB	272	photo cover	978-1-59307-954-3	Novelization of the 2008 movie Hellboy II: The Golden Army
Hellboy: Oddest Jobs	Christopher Golden, Joe R. Lansdale, Mark Chadbourn, John Skipp, Cody Goodfellow, Ken Bruen, Garth Nix, Brian Keene, Tad Williams, Amber Benson, Barbara Hambly, Gary A. Braunbeck, Rhys Hughes, Stephen Volk, Don Winslow, China Miéville	Mike Mignola	b/w	Dark Horse Comics	July 9, 2008	TPB	216	Mike Mignola	978-1-59307-944-4	Anthology edited by Christopher Golden
Hellboy: The All-Seeing Eye	Mark Morris	—	—	Dark Horse Comics	October 22, 2008	TPB	256	Mike Mignola	978-1-59582-142-3	
Hellboy: The Fire Wolves	Tim Lebbon	—	—	Dark Horse Comics	April 1, 2009	TPB	256	Duncan Fegredo	978-1-59582-204-8	
Lobster Johnson: The Satan Factory	Thomas E. Sniegoski	—	—	Dark Horse Comics	July 22, 2009	SC	256	Gregory Manchess	978-1-59582-203-1	
Hellboy: The Ice Wolves	Mark Chadbourn	—	—	Dark Horse Comics	September 30, 2009	TPB	256	Duncan Fegredo	978-1-59582-205-5	
Hellboy: An Assortment of Horrors	Christopher Golden, Rio Youers, Delilah S. Dawson, Chris Roberson, Chris Priestley, Chelsea Cain, Jonathan Maberry, E. Lily Yu, Michael Rowe, Richard Kadrey, Weston Ochse, Paul Tremblay, Angela Slatter, Kealan Patrick Burke, Laird Barron, Seanan McGuire, Nathan Ballingrud	Mike Mignola	Dave Stewart	Dark Horse Comics	August 23, 2017	TPB	216	Mike Mignola	978-1-5067-0343-5	Anthology edited by Christopher Golden

=== Prose stories (print) in other publications ===
Prose stories and illustrated prose stories published in other publications.

Story title	Story	Art	Colors	Publication	Issue	Published	Format	Pages	Pages (story)	Cover	ISBN
Hellboy: Dakini	Christopher Golden	—	—	Hellboy Sourcebook and Roleplaying Game	—	August 2002	HC/TPB	208	10	Mike Mignola	—
Hellboy: The City in the Sea	Christopher Golden, Mike Mignola	Mike Mignola	Dave Stewart	Weird Tales	#367	May 2023	Square bound	96	10	Mike Mignola	—

=== Audiobooks ===
Title	Story	Publisher	Published	Narrator	Run time	Cover	ISBN	Notes
Hellboy: An Assortment of Horrors	Various	Dreamscape Media	January 28, 2020	Seth Podowitz	9 hours, 25 Minutes	Mike Mignola	978-1-6665-5845-6	Anthology edited by Christopher Golden
Hellboy: The Lost Army	Christopher Golden	Dreamscape Media	February 4, 2020	Wayne Mitchell	7 hours, 1 Minute	Mike Mignola	978-1-6665-5844-9	
Hellboy: Odd Jobs	Various	Dreamscape Media	February 11, 2020	Seth Podowitz	8 hours, 32 Minutes	Mike Mignola	978-1-6665-6533-1	Anthology edited by Christopher Golden
Hellboy: The Bones of Giants	Christopher Golden	Dreamscape Media	February 25, 2020	Wayne Mitchell	7 hours, 39 Minutes	Mike Mignola	978-1-6665-6532-4	
Hellboy: Odder Jobs	Various	Dreamscape Media	March 10, 2020	Seth Podowitz	10 hours, 4 Minutes	Mike Mignola	978-1-6665-5021-4	Anthology edited by Christopher Golden
Hellboy: Emerald Hell	Tom Piccirilli	Dreamscape Media	March 17, 2020	Wayne Mitchell	6 hours, 37 Minutes	Mike Mignola	978-1-6665-5020-7	
Hellboy: Oddest Jobs	Various	Dreamscape Media	March 24, 2020	Seth Podowitz	9 hours, 41 Minutes	Mike Mignola	978-1-6665-6621-5	Anthology edited by Christopher Golden
Hellboy: The All-Seeing Eye	Mark Morrris	Dreamscape Media	April 7, 2020	Wayne Mitchell	9 hours, 15 Minutes	Mike Mignola	978-1-6665-5022-1	
Hellboy: The Fire Wolves	Tim Lebbon	Dreamscape Media	April 14, 2020	Qarie Marshall	8 hours, 8 Minutes	Duncan Fegredo	978-1-6665-5023-8	
Hellboy: The Ice Wolves	Mark Chadbourn	Dreamscape Media	April 21, 2020	Qarie Marshall	8 hours, 6 Minutes	Duncan Fegredo	978-1-6665-5024-5	
Hellboy: A Plague Of Wasps	Christopher Golden	GraphicAudio	July 11, 2023	Full cast	6 hours	Mike Mignola	979-8-89055-001-9	Original audiobook
Lobster Johnson: The Proteus Club	Christopher Golden, Thomas E. Sniegoski	GraphicAudio	October 24, 2023	Full cast	6 hours	Mike Mignola	979-8-89055-042-2	Original audiobook
Hellboy and the B.P.R.D.: The Goddess Of Manhattan	Christopher Golden, Thomas E. Sniegoski	GraphicAudio	September 10, 2024	Full cast	6 hours	Mike Mignola	979-8-89055-030-9	Original audiobook

== Other publications ==
Title	Story	Art	Colors	Publisher	Published	Format	Pages	Cover	ISBN	Notes
Hellboy Sourcebook and Roleplaying Game	Phil Masters, Jonathan Woodward	—	—	Steve Jackson Games	August 2002	HC	208	Mike Mignola	1-55634-684-0	GURPS role-playing game sourcebook, including: The Astromagnet (short story); The Kabandha (short story); Dakini (prose short story)
Hellboy Sourcebook and Roleplaying Game	Phil Masters, Jonathan Woodward	—	—	Steve Jackson Games	August 2002	TPB	208	Mike Mignola	1-55634-654-9	GURPS role-playing game sourcebook, including: The Astromagnet (short story); The Kabandha (short story); Dakini (prose short story)
The Art of Hellboy	—	Mike Mignola	Mark Chiarello, Matt Hollingsworth, James Sinclair, Pamela Rambo, Dave Stewart	Dark Horse Comics	March 26, 2003	Oversize HC	200	Mike Mignola	978-1-56971-910-7	Artbook collecting art from Mike Mignola, including: Hi, My Name's Hellboy (1-page promotional comic from Celebrate Diversity); The Vârcolac (original version from Dark Horse Extra #14–#19); The Nuckelavee (1-page pin-up from Dark Horse Maverick 2001)
The Art of Hellboy	—	Mike Mignola	Mark Chiarello, Matt Hollingsworth, James Sinclair, Pamela Rambo, Dave Stewart	Dark Horse Comics	March 31, 2004	TPB	200	Mike Mignola	978-1-59307-089-2	Artbook collecting art from Mike Mignola, including: Hi, My Name's Hellboy (1-page promotional comic from Celebrate Diversity); The Vârcolac (original version from Dark Horse Extra #14–#19); The Nuckelavee (1-page pin-up from Dark Horse Maverick 2001)
Hellboy: The Art of the Movie	—			Dark Horse Comics	March 3, 2004	TPB	200	photo cover	978-1-59307-188-2	Artbook for the 2004 movie Hellboy
Hellboy: The Companion	Stephen Weiner, Jason Hall, Victoria Blake	Mike Mignola	—	Dark Horse Comics	May 21, 2008	TPB	200	Mike Mignola	978-1-59307-655-9	Guide to the Hellboy Universe
Hellboy II: The Art of the Movie	—			Dark Horse Comics	June 18, 2008	TPB	224	photo cover	978-1-59307-188-2	Artbook for the 2008 movie Hellboy II: The Golden Army
Hellboy: The First 20 Years	—	Mike Mignola	Dave Stewart	Dark Horse Comics	March 19, 2014	Oversize HC	136	Mike Mignola	978-1-61655-353-1	Artbook collecting sketches and finished pieces from Mike Mignola
Artist's Edition #23 – Mike Mignola's Hellboy In Hell and Other Stories	Mike Mignola		b/w	IDW Publishing	FIRST EDITION					
Artist's Edition #23 – Mike Mignola's Hellboy In Hell and Other Stories	Mike Mignola		b/w	IDW Publishing	July 9, 2014	Original Size HC	200	Mike Mignola	978-1-63140-003-2	Reprint of original artwork in its original size: Hellboy in Hell #1–#4 (without word ballons and lettering); Hellboy in Hell: The Three Gold Whips (without word ballons and lettering); Mike Mignola's Hellboy (promotional comic from San Diego Comic Con Comics #2); Mike Mignola's Hellboy: World's Greatest Paranormal Investigator (promotional comic from Comics Buyer's Guide #1070); Faith (page 12–21 from John Byrne's Next Men #21); The Corpse (full version with 25 pages); The Ghoul (short story from The Dark Horse Book of the Dead); The Troll-Witch (short story from The Dark Horse Book of Witchcraft); Early designs and promo pieces (5 pages); Covers of Hellboy: Seed of Destruction #1 and #2
Artist's Edition #23 – Mike Mignola's Hellboy In Hell and Other Stories	Mike Mignola		b/w	IDW Publishing	SAN DIEGO COMIC CON EXCLUSIVE EDITION					
Artist's Edition #23 – Mike Mignola's Hellboy In Hell and Other Stories	Mike Mignola		b/w	IDW Publishing	July 2014	Original Size HC	200	Mike Mignola	?	Cover of Variant Edition without border
Artist's Edition #23 – Mike Mignola's Hellboy In Hell and Other Stories	Mike Mignola		b/w	IDW Publishing	VARIANT EDITION					
Artist's Edition #23 – Mike Mignola's Hellboy In Hell and Other Stories	Mike Mignola		b/w	IDW Publishing	2014	Original Size HC	200	Mike Mignola	978-1-63140-003-2	Limited edition with different cover; signed, numbered and remarqued by Mike Mignola
Artist's Edition #23 – Mike Mignola's Hellboy In Hell and Other Stories	Mike Mignola		b/w	IDW Publishing	NEW PRINTING					
Artist's Edition #23 – Mike Mignola's Hellboy In Hell and Other Stories	Mike Mignola		b/w	IDW Publishing	November 2017	Original Size HC	200	Mike Mignola	978-1-68405-105-2	New cover
Artist's Edition #23 – Mike Mignola's Hellboy In Hell and Other Stories	Mike Mignola		b/w	IDW Publishing	ARTISAN EDITION					
Artist's Edition #23 – Mike Mignola's Hellboy In Hell and Other Stories	Mike Mignola		b/w	IDW Publishing	May 10, 2022	TPB	200	Mike Mignola	978-1-68405-886-0	Smaller TPB version with new cover
The Hellboy 100 Project	—	Various	Various	Dark Horse Comics	September 23, 2015	HC	120	Various	978-1-61655-933-5	All 109 original covers to Hellboy and the B.P.R.D.: 1952 #1 of The Hero Initiative's The Hellboy 100 Project
The Hellboy 100 Project	—	Various	Various	Dark Horse Comics	September 23, 2015	TPB	120	Various	978-1-61655-932-8	All 109 original covers to Hellboy and the B.P.R.D.: 1952 #1 of The Hero Initiative's The Hellboy 100 Project
Hellboy: Into the Silent Sea Studio Edition	Mike Mignola, Gary Gianni	Gary Gianni	b/w	Flesk Publications	April 2018	Oversize HC	144	Gary Gianni	978-1-64041-004-6	Reprint of original artwork: Hellboy: Into the Silent Sea (including thumbnails, pencil preliminaries, story text and notes for each page); The MonsterMen: A Gift for the Wicked from Hellboy Christmas Special
Hellboy: The Art of the Motion Picture	—			Dark Horse Comics	April 09, 2019	HC	200	photo cover	978-1-5067-1177-5	Artbook for the 2019 movie Hellboy
Hellboy: 25 Years of Covers	—	Various	Various	Dark Horse Comics	July 3, 2019	Oversize HC	192	Mike Mignola	978-1-5067-1455-4	Artbook collecting covers from the Hellboy Universe
Mike Mignola: The Quarantine Sketchbook	Mike Mignola	Mike Mignola	b/w	Dark Horse Comics	March 3, 2021	Oversize HC	208	Mike Mignola	978-1-5067-2427-0	A collection of Mike Mignola's self-quarantine sketches during the 2020 coronavirus pandemic
Hell, Ink & Water: The Art of Mike Mignola	Mike Mignola	Mike Mignola	Mike Mignola	IDW Publishing	October 2024	Oversize HC	64	Mike Mignola	979-8-88724-290-3	Official catalog for Mike Mignola art gallery show at Philippe Labaune Gallery, September 20, 2024 – October 26, 2024

== Chronological list of Hellboy and related comic books ==
The following list includes all miniseries, one-shots, back-up features, crossovers, and guest appearances of Hellboy and related characters sorted by date of publishing. Collections, art books, and other reprints are only listed if they premiered previously unpublished material.

=== 1991 ===
- Great Salt Lake Comic Convention '91 pamphlet (August 1991) – first use of the character name on a demon's belt buckle

=== 1993 ===
- Dime Press #4 (March 1993) – first appearance of Hellboy prototype fighting Nathan Never on the cover
- John Byrne's Next Men #14 (April 1993) by John Byrne – cameo appearance by Hellboy on a poster in the background
- San Diego Comic Con Comics #2 (August 1993) – includes first published Hellboy story Mike Mignola's Hellboy by Mike Mignola and John Byrne
- John Byrne's Next Men #21 (December 1993) by John Byrne and Mike Mignola – guest appearance by Hellboy; first appearance in a full-color comic story

=== 1994 ===
- Hellboy: Seed of Destruction (4 issues, March – June 1994) by Mike Mignola and John Byrne
- Danger Unlimited #4 (May 1994) by John Byrne – cameo appearance by Hellboy
- Comics Buyer's Guide #1070 (May 1994) – includes promo insert Mike Mignola's Hellboy: World's Greatest Paranormal Investigator by Mike Mignola and John Byrne
- Dark Horse Presents #88–#91 (August – November 1994) – includes The Wolves of Saint August by Mike Mignola
- Celebrate Diversity Collector's Edition (catalog supplement, October 1994) – includes panel ad Hi, My Name's Hellboy by Mike Mignola

=== 1995 ===
- Madman Comics #5 (January 1995) by Mike Allred – major cameo by Hellboy
- Capital City's Advance Comics catalog #75–#82 (March – October 1995) – includes first part of The Corpse by Mike Mignola
- Babe 2 #2 (April 1995) by John Byrne - major cameo by Abe Sapien
- Dark Horse Presents #100-2 (August 1995) – includes The Chained Coffin by Mike Mignola
- Shi/Cyblade: The Battle For Independents (September 1995) by Billy Tucci, Gary Cohn, and others – includes a small cameo by Hellboy
- Hellboy: The Wolves of Saint August (November 1995) - collects The Wolves of Saint August by Mike Mignola with 8 new pages

=== 1996 ===
- Hellboy: The Corpse and the Iron Shoes (one-shot, January 1996) by Mike Mignola
- Ghost/Hellboy Special (2 issues, May – June 1996) by Mike Mignola and Scott Benefiel
- Hellboy: Wake the Devil (5 issues, June – October 1996) by Mike Mignola
- Body Bags #1 (September 1996) by Jason Pearson – brief cameo by Hellboy and Abe Sapien in disguise
- Gen¹³ #13C (November 1996) by Brandon Choi, J. Scott Campbell, and Jim Lee – guest appearance by Hellboy
- Savage Dragon #34–#35 (December 1996 – January 1997) – includes Savage Dragon/Hellboy by Erik Larsen

=== 1997 ===
- The Heretic #4 (March 1997) by Joe Phillips – cameo by Hellboy and Abe Sapien
- Hellboy: The Lost Army (prose, June 1997) by Christopher Golden
- Hellboy: Wake the Devil TPB (June 1997) – includes a new epilogue by Mike Mignola
- Hellboy: Almost Colossus (2 issues, June – July 1997) by Mike Mignola
- Savage Dragon #41 (August 1997) by Erik Larsen – cameo by Hellboy
- Hellboy Junior Halloween Special (one-shot, October 1997) by Bill Wray, Mike Mignola, and others
- Hellboy Christmas Special (one-shot, December 1997) – includes A Christmas Underground by Mike Mignola

=== 1998 ===
- Abe Sapien: Drums of the Dead (one-shot, March 1998) by Brian McDonald and Derek Thompson – includes Heads by Mike Mignola
- Savage Dragon #51 (June 1998) by Erik Larsen – cameo by Hellboy
- Hellboy: The Chained Coffin and Others TPB (August 1998) – includes The Baba Yaga and 3 new story pages for Almost Colossus, both by Mike Mignola
- Painkiller Jane/Hellboy (one-shot, August 1998) by Brian Augustyn, Rick Leonardi, and Jimmy Palmiotti
- Dark Horse Presents Annual 1998 (August 1998) – includes The Right Hand of Doom by Mike Mignola
- Batman/Hellboy/Starman (2 issues, November – December 1998) by James Robinson and Mike Mignola

=== 1999 ===
- Gary Gianni's The Monster Men (one-shot, August 1999) – includes Goodbye Mister Tod by Mike Mignola
- Dark Horse Presents Annual 1999 (August 1999) – includes Pancakes by Mike Mignola
- Dark Horse Extra #14–#19 (August 1999 – January 2000) – includes The Vârcolac by Mike Mignola
- Hellboy: Box Full of Evil (2 issues, August – September 1999) by Mike Mignola – #1 includes Lobster Johnson: The Killer in My Skull by Mike Mignola, Matt Smith, and Ryan Sook; #2 includes Abe Sapien versus Science by Mike Mignola and Matt Smith
- Hellboy Junior (2 issues, October – November 1999) by Bill Wray, Mike Mignola, and others
- Hellboy: Odd Jobs (prose anthology, December 1999) edited by Christopher Golden

=== 2000 ===
- Sin City: Hell and Back #7 (January 2000) by Frank Miller – brief appearance by Hellboy in a hallucination
- Dark Horse Presents #151 (February 2000) – includes The Nature of the Beast by Mike Mignola
- Hellboy: The Right Hand of Doom TPB (April 2000) – includes King Vold, a new version of The Vârcolac, and a new epilogue for Box Full of Evil, all by Mike Mignola

=== 2001 ===
- Hellboy: Conqueror Worm (4 issues, May – August 2001) by Mike Mignola
- Dark Horse Maverick 2001 (one-shot, July 2001) – includes pinup The Nuckelavee by Mike Mignola
- Hellboy: The Bones of Giants (prose, December 2001) by Christopher Golden
- Dark Horse Extra #42–#44 (December 2001 – February 2002) – includes B.P.R.D.: Hollow Earth Dark Horse Extra by Christopher Golden and Ryan Sook

=== 2002 ===
- B.P.R.D.: Hollow Earth (3 issues, January – June 2002) by Mike Mignola, Christopher Golden, Thomas E. Sniegoski, and Ryan Sook
- Hellboy: Conqueror Worm TPB (February 2002) – includes a new epilogue by Mike Mignola
- Hellboy: The Third Wish (2 issues, July – August 2002) by Mike Mignola
- Hellboy Sourcebook and Roleplaying Game (August 2002) – includes The Astromagnet by Mike Mignola, Jai Nitz, Philip Reed, and Zach Howard; The Kabandha by Jai Nitz, Philip Reed, and Peter Bergting; and the prose short story Dakini by Christopher Golden
- Dark Horse Maverick: Happy Endings (September 2002) – includes The Magician and the Snake by Mike Mignola and Katie Mignola

=== 2003 ===
- Hellboy: Weird Tales (8 issues, February 2003 – April 2004) by various writers
- B.P.R.D.: The Soul of Venice (one-shot, May 2003) by Michael Avon Oeming, Miles Gunter, and Mike Mignola
- B.P.R.D.: Dark Waters (one-shot, July 2003) by Brian Augustyn and Guy Davis
- The Dark Horse Book of Hauntings (one-shot, August 2003) – includes Dr. Carp's Experiment by Mike Mignola
- B.P.R.D.: Night Train (one-shot, September 2003) by Geoff Johns and Scott Kolins
- B.P.R.D.: There's Something Under My Bed (one-shot, November 2003) by Joe Harris, Adam Pollina, and Guillermo Zubiaga

=== 2004 ===
- Hellboy Junior TPB (January 2004) – includes Hellboy Jr. vs. Hitler by Bill Wray, Mike Mignola, and others
- Hellboy (movie novelization, February 2004) by Yvonne Navarro
- Hellboy Premiere Edition (one-shot, March 2004) – includes The Penanggalan by Mike Mignola, and B.P.R.D.: Born Again by Mike Mignola, John Arcudi, and Guy Davis
- B.P.R.D.: Plague of Frogs (5 issues, March – July 2004) by Mike Mignola and Guy Davis
- The Goon #7 (June 2004) by Eric Powell and Mike Mignola – featuring Hellboy
- The Dark Horse Book of Witchcraft (one-shot, July 2004) – includes The Troll Witch by Mike Mignola
- B.P.R.D.: The Soul of Venice & Other Stories TPB (August 2004) – includes B.P.R.D.: Another Day at the Office by Mike Mignola and Cameron Stewart
- Hellboy: Odder Jobs (prose anthology, October 2004) edited by Christopher Golden
- B.P.R.D.: The Dead (5 issues, November 2004 – March 2005) by Mike Mignola, John Arcudi, and Guy Davis

=== 2005 ===
- Hellboy: On Earth As It Is In Hell (prose, January 2005) by Brian Hodge
- The Dark Horse Book of the Dead (one-shot, June 2005) – includes The Ghoul by Mike Mignola
- Hellboy: The Island (2 issues, June – July 2005) by Mike Mignola
- B.P.R.D.: The Black Flame (6 issues, August 2005 – January 2006) by Mike Mignola, John Arcudi, and Guy Davis

=== 2006 ===
- Hellboy: Makoma (2 issues, February – March 2006) by Richard Corben and Mike Mignola
- Hellboy: Unnatural Selection (prose, March 2006) by Tim Lebbon
- B.P.R.D.: The Universal Machine (5 issues, April – August 2006) by Mike Mignola, John Arcudi, and Guy Davis
- Hellboy: Strange Places TPB (April 2006) – includes a new epilogue for The Island by Mike Mignola
- Hellboy: The God Machine (prose, July 2006) by Thomas E. Sniegoski
- Hellboy Animated: Phantom Limbs (one-shot, October 2006) by Jim Pascoe and Rick Lacy
- The Dark Horse Book of Monsters (one-shot, December 2006) – includes The Hydra and the Lion by Mike Mignola

=== 2007 ===
- Hellboy Animated: The Black Wedding (January 2007) by Jim Pascoe and Rick Lacy – also includes Pyramid of Death by Tad Stones and Fabio Laguna
- Hellboy: The Dragon Pool (prose, March 2007) by Christopher Golden
- B.P.R.D.: Garden of Souls (5 issues, March – July 2007) by Mike Mignola, John Arcudi, and Guy Davis
- Hellboy: Darkness Calls (6 issues, May – November 2007) by Mike Mignola and Duncan Fegredo
- Hellboy Animated: The Yearning (one-shot, May 2007) by Jim Pascoe and Ben Stenbeck
- Hellboy Animated: The Judgment Bell (June 2007) by Jim Pascoe and Rick Lacy – also includes The Menace of the Mechanical Monster by Tad Stones
- B.P.R.D.: Killing Ground (5 issues, August – December 2007) by Mike Mignola, John Arcudi, and Guy Davis
- They That Go Down to the Sea in Ships (one-shot, August 2007) by Mike Mignola, Joshua Dysart, and Jason Shawn Alexander
- Lobster Johnson: The Iron Prometheus (5 issues, September 2007 – January 2008) by Mike Mignola and Jason Armstrong
- Hellboy: The Troll Witch and Others TPB (October 2007) – includes The Vampire of Prague by P. Craig Russell and Mike Mignola
- Hellboy Animated: The Menagerie (December 2007) by Jason Hall and Rick Lacy – also includes Small Victories by Nate Piekos and Fabio Laguna

=== 2008 ===
- B.P.R.D.: 1946 (5 issues, January – May 2008) by Mike Mignola, Joshua Dysart, and Paul Azaceta
- Hellboy: The Golden Army (promotional comic, January 2008) by Mike Mignola, Guillermo del Toro, and Francisco Ruiz Velasco
- Abe Sapien: The Drowning (5 issues, February – June 2008) by Mike Mignola and Jason Shawn Alexander
- Hellboy: Emerald Hell (prose, February 2008) by Tom Piccirilli
- MySpace Dark Horse Presents #8–#9 (digital release on MySpace, March – April 2008) – includes B.P.R.D.: Revival by John Arcudi and Guy Davis
- Free Comic Book Day 2008: Hellboy (one-shot, May 2008) – includes The Mole by Mike Mignola and Duncan Fegredo; B.P.R.D.: Bishop Olek's Devil by Mike Mignola, Josh Dysart, and Paul Azaceta; and B.P.R.D.: Out of Reach by Mike Mignola, John Arcudi, and Guy Davis
- Hellboy: Darkness Calls TPB (May 2008) – includes two new epilogues by Mike Mignola and Duncan Fegredo
- B.P.R.D.: War on Frogs (4 issues, June 2008 – December 2009) by John Arcudi, Herb Trimpe, John Severin, Karl Moline, Peter Snejbjerg, and Guy Davis – there was a six month interval between issues
- Hellboy II: The Golden Army (movie novelization, June 2008) by Robert Greenberger
- B.P.R.D.: The Ectoplasmic Man (one-shot, June 2008) by John Arcudi, Mike Mignola, and Ben Stenbeck
- Hellboy: The Crooked Man (3 issues, July – September 2008) by Mike Mignola and Richard Corben
- Hellboy: Oddest Jobs (prose anthology, July 2008) edited by Christopher Golden
- B.P.R.D.: The Warning (5 issues, July – November 2008) by Mike Mignola, John Arcudi, and Guy Davis
- Hellboy: The All-Seeing Eye (prose, October 2008) by Mark Morris
- Hellboy: In the Chapel of Moloch (one-shot, October 2008) by Mike Mignola
- MySpace Dark Horse Presents #16 (digital release on MySpace, November 2008) – includes Witchfinder: Murderous Intent by Mike Mignola and Ben Stenbeck
- Hellboy: The Wild Hunt (8 issues, December 2008 – March 2009 and August – November 2009) by Mike Mignola and Duncan Fegredo – #2–#3 include How Koshchei Became Deathless by Mike Mignola and Guy Davis; #4 includes Baba Yaga's Feast by Mike Mignola and Guy Davis; #7 includes The Burial of Katharine Baker by Mike Mignola, Scott Allie and Patric Reynolds

=== 2009 ===
- B.P.R.D.: The Black Goddess (5 issues, January – May 2009) by Mike Mignola, John Arcudi, and Guy Davis
- Hellboy: The Fire Wolves (prose, April 2009) by Tim Lebbon
- MySpace Dark Horse Presents #23 (digital release on MySpace, June 2009) – includes B.P.R.D.: And What Shall I Find There? by Mike Mignola, Joshua Dysart, and Patric Reynolds
- B.P.R.D.: 1947 (5 issues, July – November 2009) by Mike Mignola, Joshua Dysart, Fábio Moon, and Gabriel Bá
- Sir Edward Grey, Witchfinder: In the Service of Angels (5 issues, July – November 2009) by Mike Mignola and Ben Stenbeck
- Lobster Johnson: The Satan Factory (prose, July 2009) by Thomas E. Sniegoski
- Hellboy: The Ice Wolves (prose, September 2009) by Mark Chadbourn
- Abe Sapien: The Haunted Boy (one-shot, October 2009) by Mike Mignola, John Arcudi, and Patric Reynolds
- Hellboy: The Bride of Hell (one-shot, December 2009) by Mike Mignola and Richard Corben

=== 2010 ===
- B.P.R.D.: King of Fear (5 issues, January – May 2010) by Mike Mignola, John Arcudi, and Guy Davis
- B.P.R.D.: War on Frogs TPB (April 2010) – includes 8 new pages for B.P.R.D.: Revival
- Hellboy in Mexico (Or, a Drunken Blur) (one-shot, May 2010) by Mike Mignola and Richard Corben
- Abe Sapien: The Abyssal Plain (2 issues, June – July 2010) by Mike Mignola, John Arcudi, and Peter Snejbjerg
- Hellboy: The Storm (3 issues, July – September 2010) by Mike Mignola and Duncan Fegredo
- B.P.R.D. Hell on Earth: New World (5 issues, August – December 2010) by Mike Mignola, John Arcudi, and Guy Davis
- Hellboy: The Whittier Legacy (short story in 2 parts, digital release on DH:HD, October 2010) – by Mike Mignola
- Beasts of Burden/Hellboy: Sacrifice (one-shot, October 2010) by Mike Mignola, Evan Dorkin, and Jill Thompson
- Hellboy: Double Feature of Evil (one-shot, November 2010) by Mike Mignola and Richard Corben
- Hellboy: The Sleeping and the Dead (2 issues, December 2010 – February 2011) by Mike Mignola and Scott Hampton

=== 2011 ===
- B.P.R.D. Hell on Earth: Gods (3 issues, January – March 2011) by Mike Mignola, John Arcudi, and Guy Davis
- Sir Edward Grey, Witchfinder: Lost and Gone Forever (5 issues, February – June 2011) by Mike Mignola, John Arcuda, and John Severine
- B.P.R.D. Hell on Earth: Seattle (Emerald City Comic-Con one-shot, March 2011) by Mike Mignola, John Arcudi, and Guy Davis
- B.P.R.D.: The Dead Remembered (3 issues, April – June 2011) by Mike Mignola, Scott Allie, Karl Moline, and Andy Owens
- Hellboy: Buster Oakley Gets His Wish (one-shot, April 2011) by Mike Mignola and Kevin Nowlan
- Hellboy: Being Human (one-shot, May 2011) by Mike Mignola and Richard Corben
- Hellboy: The Fury (3 issues, June – August 2011) by Mike Mignola and Duncan Fegredo
- B.P.R.D.: Casualties (digital release on Dark Horse Digital, July 2011) by Mike Mignola, John Arcudi, and Guy Davis
- B.P.R.D. Hell on Earth: Monsters (2 issues, July – August 2011) by Mike Mignola, John Arcudi, and Tyler Crook
- Criminal_Macabre/The_Goon When Freaks Collide (one-shot, July 2011) by Steve Niles, Eric Powell, and Christopher Mitten – cameo by Hellboy
- B.P.R.D. Hell on Earth: Russia (5 issues, September 2011 – January 2012) by Mike Mignola, John Arcudi, and Tyler Crook
- Abe Sapien: The Devil Does Not Jest (2 issues, September – October 2011) by Mike Mignola, John Arcudi, and James Harren
- Hellboy: House of the Living Dead (original graphic novel, November 2011) by Mike Mignola and Richard Corben
- Dark Horse Presents Volume 2 #7 (December 2011) – includes Hellboy vs. the Aztec Mummy by Mike Mignola

=== 2012 ===
- Lobster Johnson: The Burning Hand (5 issues, January – May 2012) by Mike Mignola, John Arcudi, and Tonči Zonjić
- Dark Horse Presents Volume 2 #8 (February 2012) – includes B.P.R.D.: An Unmarked Grave by John Arcudi and Duncan Fegredo
- B.P.R.D. Hell on Earth: The Long Death (3 issues, February – April 2012) by Mike Mignola, John Arcudi, and James Harren
- Dark Horse Presents Volume 2 #9 (February 2012) – includes Lobster Johnson: Tony Masso's Finest Hour by Mike Mignola and Joe Querio
- The Storm and the Fury TPB (March 2012) – includes a new epilogue by Mike Mignola and Duncan Fegredo
- B.P.R.D. Hell on Earth: The Pickens County Horror (2 issues, March – April 2012) by Mike Mignola, Scott Allie, and Jason Latour
- B.P.R.D. Hell on Earth: The Devil's Engine (3 issues, May – July 2012) by Mike Mignola, John Arcudi, and Tyler Crook
- B.P.R.D. Hell on Earth: The Transformation of J.H. O'Donnell (one-shot, May 2012) by Mike Mignola, Scott Allie, and Max Fiumara
- B.P.R.D. Hell on Earth: Exorcism (2 issues, June – July 2012) by Mike Mignola and Cameron Stewart
- Lobster Johnson: The Prayer of Neferu (one-shot, August 2012) by Mike Mignola, John Arcudi, and Wilfredo Torres
- B.P.R.D. Hell on Earth: Return of the Master (5 issues, August – December 2012) by Mike Mignola, John Arcudi, and Tyler Crook
- Lobster Johnson: Caput Mortuum (one-shot, September 2012) by Mike Mignola, John Arcudi, and Tonči Zonjić
- B.P.R.D.: 1948 (5 issues, October 2012 – February 2013) by Mike Mignola, John Arcudi, and Max Fiumara
- Hellboy in Hell #1–#4 (December 2012 – March 2013) by Mike Mignola

=== 2013 ===
- B.P.R.D. Hell on Earth: The Abyss of Time (2 issues, January – February 2013) by Mike Mignola, Scott Allie, and James Harren
- Sledgehammer 44 (2 issues, March – April 2013) by Mike Mignola, John Arcudi, and Jason Latour
- B.P.R.D. Hell on Earth: A Cold Day in Hell (2 issues, March – April 2013) by Mike Mignola, John Arcudi, and Peter Snejbjerg
- B.P.R.D.: Vampire (5 issues, March – July 2013) by Mike Mignola, Fábio Moon, and Gabriel Bá
- Abe Sapien: Dark and Terrible (3 issues, April – June 2013) by Mike Mignola, Scott Allie, and Sebastián Fiumara
- B.P.R.D. Hell on Earth: Wasteland (3 issues, May – July 2013) by Mike Mignola, John Arcudi, and Laurence Campbell
- Lobster Johnson: Satan Smells a Rat (one-shot, May 2013) by Mike Mignola, John Arcudi, and Kevin Nowlan
- Abe Sapien: The New Race of Man (2 issues, July – August 2013) by Mike Mignola, John Arcudi, and Max Fiumara
- Lobster Johnson: A Scent of Lotus (2 issues, July – August 2013) by Mike Mignola, John Arcudi, and Sebastián Fiumara
- B.P.R.D. Hell on Earth: Lake of Fire (5 issues, August – December 2013) by Mike Mignola, John Arcudi, and Tyler Crook
- Itty Bitty Hellboy (5 issues, August – December 2013) by Art Baltazar and Franco
- Abe Sapien: The Shape of Things to Come (2 issues, October – November 2013) by Mike Mignola, Scott Allie, and Sebastián Fiumara
- Hellboy: The Midnight Circus (original graphic novel, October 2013) by Mike Mignola and Duncan Fegredo
- Sledgehammer 44: Lightning War (3 issues, November 2013 – January 2014) by Mike Mignola, John Arcudi, and Laurence Campbell
- Hellboy in Hell: The Three Gold Whips (one-shot, December 2013) by Mike Mignola and Dave Stewart
- Abe Sapien: The Land of the Dead (one-shot, December 2013) by Mike Mignola, Scott Allie, and Michael Avon Oeming
- Dark Horse Presents Volume 2 #31–#32 (December 2013 – January 2014) – includes Hellboy Gets Married by Mike Mignola and Mick McMahon

=== 2014 ===
- Abe Sapien: To the Last Man (3 issues, January – March 2014) by Mike Mignola, Scott Allie, and Max Fiumara
- B.P.R.D. Hell on Earth: The Reign of the Black Flame (5 issues, January – May 2014) by Mike Mignola, John Arcudi, and James Harren
- Lobster Johnson: Get the Lobster (5 issues, February – August 2014) by Mike Mignola, John Arcudi, and Tonči Zonjić
- Hellboy 20th Anniversary Sampler (one-shot, March 2014) – includes reprints of The Ghoul and B.P.R.D.: Another Day at the Office with new story The Coffin Man by Mike Mignola and Fabio Moon
- Free Comic Book Day 2014: All Ages (one-shot, May 2014) – includes Itty Bitty Hellboy: The Chained Coughin' by Art Baltazar and Franko
- Hellboy in Hell: The Death Card (one-shot, May 2014) by Mike Mignola
- Abe Sapien: The Garden (one-shot, May 2014) by Mike Mignola, Scott Allie, and Max Fiumara
- Dark Horse Presents #36 (May 2014) – includes Witchfinder: Beware the Ape by Mike Mignola and Ben Stenbeck
- Abe Sapien: The Healer (one-shot, June 2014) by Mike Mignola, Scott Allie, and Sebastián Fiumara
- B.P.R.D. Hell on Earth: The Devil's Wings (2 issues, June – July 2014) by Mike Mignola, John Arcudi, and Laurence Campbell
- Sir Edward Grey, Witchfinder: The Mysteries of Unland (5 issues, June – October 2014) by Kim Newman, Maura McHugh, and Tyler Crook
- Abe Sapien: Visions, Dreams, and Fishin' (one-shot, July 2014) by Mike Mignola, Scott Allie, and Max Fiumara
- Abe Sapien: Lost Lives (one-shot, August 2014) by Mike Mignola, Scott Allie, and Juan Ferreyra
- B.P.R.D. Hell on Earth: The Broken Equation (2 issues, August – September 2014) by Mike Mignola, John Arcudi, and Joe Querio
- Abe Sapien: Sacred Places (2 issues, September – October 2014) by Mike Mignola, Scott Allie, and Sebastián Fiumara
- B.P.R.D. Hell on Earth: Grind (one-shot, October 2014) by Mike Mignola, John Arcudi, and Tyler Crook
- B.P.R.D. Hell on Earth: Flesh and Stone (5 issues, November 2014 – March 2015) by Mike Mignola, John Arcudi, and James Harren
- Hellboy and the B.P.R.D.: 1952 (5 issues, December 2014 – April 2015) by Mike Mignola, John Arcudi, and Alex Maleev
- Abe Sapien: A Darkness So Great (5 issues, December 2014 – April 2015) by Mike Mignola, Scott Allie, Max Fiumara, Sebastián Fiumara, and Robert Sikoryak

=== 2015 ===
- Abe Sapien: The Calm Before the Storm (short story, digital release on multiversitycomics.com, January 2015) by Alise Gluškova and Scott Allie
- Dark Horse Presents Volume 3 #7 (February 2015) – includes Hellboy: The Coffin Man 2: The Rematch by Mike Mignola and Gabriel Bá
- Frankenstein Underground (5 issues, March – July 2015) by Mike Mignola and Ben Stenbeck
- B.P.R.D. Hell on Earth: Nowhere, Nothing, Never (3 issues, April – June 2015) by Mike Mignola, John Arcudi, and Peter Snejbjerg
- Archie vs. Predator #1 (April 2015) by Alex de Campi and Fernando Ruiz - includes Sabrina Meets Hellboy by Alex de Campi and Robert Hack
- Abe Sapien: The Ogopogo (one-shot, May 2015) by Mike Mignola, Scott Allie, and Kevin Nowlan
- Dark Horse Presents Volume 3 #11 (June 2015) – includes Abe Sapien: Subconscious by John Arcudi and Mark Nelson
- Abe Sapien: The Shadow Over Suwanee (3 issues, July – August 2015) by Mike Mignola, Scott Allie, Sebastián Fiumara, Max Fiumara, and Tyler Crook
- B.P.R.D. Hell on Earth: Modern Prometheus (2 issues, July – August 2015) by Mike Mignola, John Arcudi, and Julián Totino Tedesco
- Lobster Johnson: A Chain Forged in Life (one-shot, July 2015) by Mike Mignola, John Arcudi, Troy Nixey, and Kevin Nowlan
- Hellboy in Hell: The Hounds of Pluto (2 issues, August – September 2015) by Mike Mignola
- B.P.R.D. Hell on Earth: End of Days (5 issues, September 2015 – January 2016) by Mike Mignola, John Arcudi, and Laurence Campbell
- Abe Sapien: Icthyo Sapien (one-shot, October 2015) by Mike Mignola, Scott Allie, and Alise Gluškova
- Hellboy and the B.P.R.D. 1953: The Phantom Hand & The Kelpie (one-shot, October 2015) by Mike Mignola and Ben Stenbeck
- Abe Sapien: The Garden II (2 issues, November – December 2015) by Mike Mignola, Scott Allie, and Max Fiumara
- Dark Horse Presents Volume 3 #16 (November 2015) – includes The Excorcist of Vorsk by Mike Mignola and Todd Mignola
- Hellboy and the B.P.R.D. 1953: The Witch Tree & Rawhead and Bloody Bones (one-shot, November 2015) by Mike Mignola and Ben Stenbeck
- Itty Bitty Hellboy: The Search for the Were-Jaguar! (4 issues, November 2015 – February 2026) by Art Baltazar and Franco
- Lobster Johnson: The Glass Mantis (one-shot, December 2015) by Mike Mignola, John Arcudi, and Toni Fejzula

=== 2016 ===
- Abe Sapien: Witchcraft & Demonology (one-shot, January 2016) by Mike Mignola, Scott Allie, and Santiago Caruso
- Hellboy Winter Special (one-shot, January 2016) – includes Broken Vessels by Mike Mignola, Scott Allie, and Tim Sale; Hellboy and the B.P.R.D.: Wandering Souls by Mike Mignola, Chris Roberson, and Michael Walsh; Mood Swings by Chelsea Cain and Michael Avon Oeming; and Lobster Johnson: Kung Pao Lobster by Dean Rankine
- Abe Sapien: The Black School (one-shot, February 2016) by Mike Mignola, Scott Allie, and Sebastián Fiumara
- Hellboy and the B.P.R.D. 1953: Beyond the Fences (3 issues, February – April 2016) by Mike Mignola, Chris Roberson, Paolo Rivera, and Joe Rivera
- Lobster Johnson: The Forgotten Man (one-shot, April 2016) by Mike Mignola, John Arcudi, and Peter Snejbjerg
- Abe Sapien: Regressions (2 issues, April – May 2016) by Mike Mignola, Scott Allie, and Max Fiumara
- B.P.R.D. Hell on Earth: The Exorcist (3 issues, April – June 2016) by Mike Mignola and Cameron Stewart
- Hellboy in Hell: The Spanish Bride (one-shot, May 2016) by Mike Mignola
- Free Comic Book Day 2016: Serenity (one-shot, May 2008) – includes The Mirror by Mike Mignola and Richard Corben
- 3-D Cowboy's Cosmic Convict Challenge(rs) (May 2016) by Ryan Browne, Mike Norton, Tim Seeley, and Luke Smarto – guest appearance by Hellboy
- Lobster Johnson: Metal Monsters of Midtown (3 issues, May – July 2016) by Mike Mignola, John Arcudi, and Tonci Zonjic
- Hellboy in Hell: For Whom the Bell Tolls (one-shot, June 2016) by Mike Mignola
- Abe Sapien: Dark and Terrible Deep (one-shot, June 2016) by Mike Mignola, Scott Allie, and Sebastián Fiumara
- Abe Sapien: The Garden III (one-shot, July 2016) by Mike Mignola, Scott Allie, and Max Fiumara
- B.P.R.D. Hell on Earth: Cometh the Hour (5 issues, July – November 2016) by Mike Mignola, John Arcudi, and Laurence Campbell
- Abe Sapien: The Desolate Shore (one-shot, August 2016) by Mike Mignola, Scott Allie, and Sebastián Fiumara
- Sir Edward Grey, Witchfinder: City of the Dead (5 issues, August – December 2016) by Mike Mignola, Chris Roberson, and Ben Stenbeck
- Rise of the Black Flame (5 issues, September 2016 – January 2017) by Mike Mignola, Chris Roberson, and Christopher Mitten
- Hellboy and the B.P.R.D. 1954: Black Sun (2 issues, September – October 2016) by Mike Mignola, Chris Roberson, and Stephen Green
- Hellboy in Hell 2 TPB (October 2016) – includes a new prologue for The Death Card by Mike Mignola
- Hellboy and the B.P.R.D. 1954: The Unreasoning Beast (one-shot, November 2016) by Mike Mignola, Chris Roberson, and Patrick Reynolds

=== 2017 ===
- Lobster Johnson: Garden of Bones (one-shot, January 2017) by Mike Mignola, John Arcudi, and Stephen Green
- Hellboy Winter Special 2017 (one-shot, January 2017) – includes Sir Edward Grey: The Great Blizzard by Mike Mignola, Chris Roberson, and Christopher Mitten; The Visitor: God Rest Ye Merry by Mike Mignola, Chris Roberson, and Paul Grist; The Last Witch of Fairfield by Mike Mignola, Scott Allie, and Sebastián Fiumara
- The Visitor: How & Why He Stayed (5 issues, February – July 2017) by Mike Mignola, Chris Roberson, and Paul Grist
- Hellboy and the B.P.R.D. 1954: Ghost Moon (2 issues, March – April 2017) by Mike Mignola, Chris Roberson, and Brian Churilla
- Lobster Johnson: The Pirate's Ghost (3 issues, March – May 2017) by Mike Mignola, John Arcudi, and Tonci Zonjic
- Hellboy: Into the Silent Sea (original graphic novel, April 2017) by Mike Mignola and Gary Gianni
- B.P.R.D. The Devil You Know: Messiah (5 issues, July – December 2017) by Mike Mignola, Scott Allie, and Laurence Campbell
- Lobster Johnson: Mangekyō (one-shot, August 2017) by Mike Mignola, John Arcudi, and Ben Stenbeck
- Hellboy and the B.P.R.D. 1955: Secret Nature (one-shot, August 2017) by Mike Mignola, Chris Roberson, and Shawn Martinbrough
- Hellboy: An Assortment of Horrors (prose anthology, August 2017) edited by Christopher Golden
- Hellboy and the B.P.R.D. 1955: Occult Intelligence (3 issues, September – November 2017) by Mike Mignola, Chris Roberson, and Brian Churilla
- Rasputin: The Voice of the Dragon (5 issues, November 2017 – March 2018) by Mike Mignola, Chris Roberson, and Christopher Mitten
- Hellboy: Krampusnacht (one-shot, December 2017) by Mike Mignola and Adam Hughes

=== 2018 ===
- Koshchei the Deathless (6 issues, January – June 2018) by Mike Mignola and Ben Stenbeck
- Hellboy and the B.P.R.D. 1955: Burning Season (one-shot, February 2018) by Mike Mignola, Chris Roberson, Paolo Rivera, and Joe Rivera
- B.P.R.D.: The Devil You Know: Pandemonium (5 issues, May – September 2018) by Mike Mignola, Scott Allie, Sebastián Fiumara, and Laurence Campbell
- Playboy May/June 2018 (May 2018) – includes Return of the Lambton Worm by Mike Mignola and Ben Stenbeck
- Sir Edward Grey, Witchfinder: The Gates of Heaven (5 issues, May – September 2018) by Mike Mignola, Chris Roberson, and D'Israeli
- Abe Sapien: The Drowning and Other Stories TPB (July 2018) – includes a new epilogue for Icthyo Sapien by Mike Mignola, Scott Allie, and Alise Gluškova
- Hellboy and the B.P.R.D. 1956 (5 issues, November 2018 – March 2019) by Mike Mignola, Chris Roberson, Yishan Li, Mike Norton, and Michael Avon Oeming
- Crimson Lotus (5 issues, November 2018 – March 2019) by John Arcudi and Mindy Lee
- B.P.R.D.: The Devil You Know: Ragna Rok (5 issues, December 2018 – April 2019) by Mike Mignola, Scott Allie, Laurence Campbell, and Christopher Mitten
- Hellboy Winter Special 2018 (one-shot, December 2018) – includes Hellboy and the B.P.R.D.: Happy New Year, Ava Galluci by Mike Mignola and Ben Stenbeck; B.P.R.D.: Vampire: Lost Ones by Fabio Moon and Gabriel Ba; and Lobster Johnson: The Empty Chair by Tonci Zonjic

=== 2019 ===
- Hellboy vs. Lobster Johnson: The Ring of Death (one-shot, May 2019) by Mike Mignola, Chris Roberson, and Mike Norton – also includes Down Mexico Way by Mike Mignola, Chris Roberson, and Paul Grist
- Hellboy and the B.P.R.D.: The Beast of Vargu (one-shot, June 2019) by Mike Mignola and Duncan Fegredo – includes Hellboy and the B.P.R.D.: The Secret God of the Roma by Mike Mignola and Duncan Fegredo
- Hellboy and the B.P.R.D.: Saturn Returns (3 issues, August – October 2019) by Mike Mignola, Scott Allie, and Christopher Mitten
- Hellboy and the B.P.R.D.: Long Night at Goloski Station (one-shot, October 2019) by Mike Mignola and Matt Smith,
- Sir Edward Grey, Witchfinder: The Reign of Darkness (5 issues, November 2019 – March 2020) by Mike Mignola, Chris Roberson, and Christopher Mitten

=== 2020 ===
- Hellboy Winter Special 2019 (one-shot, January 2020) – includes Hellboy and the B.P.R.D.: The Miser's Gift by Mike Mignola and Márk László; the Sarah Jewell teaser story The Longest Night by Chris Roberson and Leila del Duca; and "The Last Knight of St. Hagan" teaser story The Beast of Ingelheim by Scott Allie and Andrea Mutti
- Frankenstein Undone (5 issues, January – May 2020) by Mike Mignola, Scott Allie, and Ben Stenbeck - series canceled after second issue following sexual harassment allegations surrounding Scott Allie
- The Last Knight of St. Hagan (4 issues, originally intended to debut in April 2020) by Mike Mignola, Scott Allie, Andrea Mutt, Lee Loughridge - series canceled before publication of first issue following sexual harassment allegations surrounding Scott Allie
- Hellboy and the B.P.R.D.: The Return of Effie Kolb (2 issues, February – October 2020) by Mike Mignola and Zach Howard
- Fearless Dawn meets Hellboy (one-shot, June 2020) by Mike Mignola and Steve Mannion
- Hellboy and the B.P.R.D.: The Seven Wives Club (one-shot, November 2020) by Mike Mignola and Adam Hughes
- Hellboy and the B.P.R.D.: Her Fatal Hour and The Sending (one-shot, December 2020) by Mike Mignola and Tiernen Trevallion

=== 2021 ===
- Young Hellboy: The Hidden Land (4 issues, February – June 2021) by Mike Mignola, Thomas E. Sniegoski, and Craig Rousseau
- The House of Lost Horizons: A Sarah Jewell Mystery (5 issues, May – September 2021) by Mike Mignola, Chris Roberson, and Leila del Duca
- Hellboy and the B.P.R.D.: The Secret of Chesbro House (2 issues, July – August 2021) by Mike Mignola, Christopher Golden, and Shawn McManus
- Hellboy and the B.P.R.D.: 1957 — Family Ties (one-shot, September 2021) by Mike Mignola, Chris Roberson, and Laurence Campbell
- Hellboy: The Silver Lantern Club (5 issues, October 2021 – March 2022) by Mike Mignola, Chris Roberson, Ben Stenbeck, and Christopher Mitten
- Hellboy: The Bones of Giants (4 issues, November 2021 – February 2022) by Mike Mignola, Christopher Golden, and Matt Smith
- Sir Edward Grey: Acheron (one-shot, December 2021) by Mike Mignola

=== 2022 ===
- The Sword of Hyperborea (4 issues, January – April 2022) by Mike Mignola, Rob Williams, and Laurence Campbell
- Hellboy and the B.P.R.D.: 1957 — Forgotten Lives (one-shot, February 2022) by Mike Mignola, Chris Roberson, and Stephen Green
- The British Paranormal Society: Time Out of Mind (4 issues, April – October 2022) by Mike Mignola, Chris Roberson, and Andrea Mutti
- Hellboy and the B.P.R.D.: Night of the Cyclops (one-shot, May 2022) by Mike Mignola and Olivier Vatine
- Hellboy and the B.P.R.D.: Old Man Whittier (one-shot, June 2022) by Mike Mignola and Gabriel Hernández Walta
- Hellboy and the B.P.R.D.: Time Is a River (one-shot, July 2022) by Mike Mignola and Márk László
- Young Hellboy: Assault on Castle Death (4 issues, July 2022 – February 2023) by Mike Mignola, Thomas E. Sniegoski, and Craig Rousseau
- Frankenstein: New World (4 issues, August – December 2022) by Mike Mignola, Christopher Golden, Thomas E. Sniegoski, and Peter Bergting
- Hellboy and the B.P.R.D.: 1957 — Falling Sky (one-shot, August 2022) by Mike Mignola, Chris Roberson, and Shawn Martinbrough
- Castle Full of Blackbirds (4 issues, September 2022 – March 2023) by Mike Mignola, Angela Slatter, and Valeria Burzo
- Hellboy in Love: Goblin Night (2 issues, October – December 2023) by Mike Mignola, Christopher Golden, and Matt Smith
- Koshchei in Hell (4 issues, November 2022 – April 2023) by Mike Mignola and Ben Stenbeck

=== 2023 ===
- Hellboy in Love: Shadow Theater (2 issues, February – March 2023) by Mike Mignola, Christopher Golden, and Matt Smith
- Weird Tales #367 (May 2023) – includes the prose short story Hellboy: The City in the Sea by Christopher Golden and Mike Mignola
- Miss Truesdale and the Fall of Hyperborea (4 issues, May – August 2023) by Mike Mignola and Jesse Longergan
- Hellboy and the B.P.R.D.: 1957 — Fearful Symmetry (one-shot, June 2023) by Mike Mignola, Chris Roberson, and Alison Sampson
- Hellboy in Love: The Key To It All (one-shot July 2023) by Mike Mignola
- Panya: The Mummy's Curse (4 issues, July – November 2023) by Mike Mignola, Chris Roberson, and Christopher Mitten
- Hellboy and the B.P.R.D.: 1957 — From Below (one-shot, August 2023) by Mike Mignola, Chris Roberson, and Mike Norton
- Koshchei in Hell HC (September 2023) – includes a new epilogue by Mike Mignola and Ben Stenbeck
- Giant Robot Hellboy (3 issues, October – December 2023) by Mike Mignola and Duncan Fegredo
- Hellboy Winter Special: The Yule Cat (one-shot, December 2023) by Matt Smith

=== 2024 ===
- Free Comic Book Day 2024: Hellboy (one-shot, May 2024) – includes The Fortune Teller by Mike Mignola and Márk László
- The Serpent in the Garden: Ed Grey and The Last Battle for England (3 issues, November 2024 – March 2025) by Mike Mignola and Ben Stenbeck

=== 2025 ===
- Shadow of the Golden Crane (4 issues, January – June 2025) by Mike Mignola, Chris Roberson, and Michael Avon Oeming
- Frankenstein: New World – The Sea of Forever (4 issues, February – June 2025) by Mike Mignola, Christopher Golden, Thomas E. Sniegoski, and Peter Bergting
- Hellboy in Love: The Art of Fire (2 issues, August – September 2025) by Mike Mignola, Christopher Golden, and Alex Nieto
- Hellboy and the B.P.R.D.: Professor Harvey is Gone (one-shot, August 2025) by Mike Mignola and Giuseppe Manunta
- Captain Henry and the Graveyard of Time (4 issues, October 2025 – February 2026)
- Hellboy and the B.P.R.D.: The Ghost Ships of Labrador (2 issues, November 2025 – January 2026)
- Miss Truesdale and the Rise of Man (4 issues, December 2025 – March 2026)

=== 2026 ===
- Carmen Red Claw: Belly of the Beast (4 issues, January – April 2026) by Rae Allen
- The Crown: A Tale of Hell (2 issues, February – March 2026) by Mike Mignola, Todd Mignola, and Warwick Johnson-Cadwell
- Hellboy and the B.P.R.D.: The Monster of Nivola (one shot, June 2026) by Mike Mignola, Christopher Golden, and Daniele Serra
