= Eltingville =

Eltingville may refer to:

- Eltingville, Staten Island, New York
- Eltingville (Staten Island Railway station)
- Eltingville Transit Center, Staten Island
- Eltingville (comics) by Evan Dorkin
- Welcome to Eltingville animated pilot by Dorkin based on the comic
