= The Nearness of You (disambiguation) =

"The Nearness of You" is a popular song, written in 1938 by Hoagy Carmichael with lyrics by Ned Washington.

The Nearness of You may also refer to:

- The Nearness of You (Shelly Berg album), 2008
- The Nearness of You (Paul Bley album), 1989
- The Nearness of You (Red Garland album), 1962
- The Nearness of You (Helen Merrill album), 1958
- The Nearness of You (Houston Person album), 1977
- The Nearness of You (Frank Sinatra album), 1967
- Nearness of You: The Ballad Book, 2001 album by Michael Brecker
- "The Nearness of You (Astro City)", a 1996 short story
