= Eisner Award for Best Short Story =

Short story writing award

- Awarded for: Best Short Story in Comic Books
- Country: United States
- First award: 1993
- Most recent winner: “Blood Harvest,” in Brain Damage, by Shintaro Kago, translated by Zack Davisson
- Website: www.comic-con.org/awards/eisner-awards-current-info

The Eisner Award for Best Short Story is an award for "creative achievement" in American comic books that has been awarded every year since its creation in 1993. The Eisner Award rules state that "A short story must be within an anthology of bigger work or else appear online."

== Winners and nominees ==
Eisner Award for Best Short Story winners and nominees
| Year | Title | Authors | Result | Ref. |
|---|---|---|---|---|
1990s
| 1993 | "Two Cities" in Xenozoic Tales #12 (Kitchen Sink Press) | Mark Schultz | Winner | |
| 1993 | "The Artist's Life" in Eightball #9 (Fantagraphics) | Dan Clowes | Nominee | |
| 1993 | "Hippie Bitch Gets Laid" in Naughty Bits #6 (Fantagraphics) | Roberta Gregory | Nominee | |
| 1993 | "The Nemesis of Neglect" chapter of From Hell in Taboo #6 (Spiderbaby Graphix/Tundra Publishing) | Alan Moore and Eddie Campbell | Nominee | |
| 1993 | "Escape #2 The Dry Creek Bed" chapter of Through the Habitrails in Taboo #7 (Spiderbaby Graphix/Tundra Publishing) | Jeff Nicholson | Nominee | |
| 1993 | "Frank in the River" in Tantalizing Stores Presents Frank in The River (Tundra Publishing) | Jim Woodring | Nominee | |
| 1994 | "The Amazing Colossal Homer" in Simpsons Comics #1 (Bongo Comics) | Steve Vance, Cindy Vance, and Bill Morrison | Winner | |
| 1994 | "Big Man" in Rubber Blanket #3 (Rubber Blanket Press) | David Mazzucchelli | Nominee | |
| 1994 | "I Strive for Realism" in Concrete Eclectica #2 (Dark Horse Comics) | Paul Chadwick | Nominee | |
| 1994 | "The Origin of Dan Pussey" in Eightball #12 (Fantagraphics) | Dan Clowes | Nominee | |
| 1994 | "Tainted Love" in Vertigo Jam (DC Comics/Vertigo Comics) | Garth Ennis and Steve Dillon | Nominee | |
| 1995 | "The Babe Wore Red" in Sin City: The Babe Wore Red and Other Stories (Dark Horse Comics/Legend Comics) | Frank Miller | Winner | |
| 1995 | "The Hannah Story" in Drawn & Quarterly Vol. 2 #2 (Drawn & Quarterly) | Carol Tyler | Nominee | |
| 1995 | "Laughter After Midnight" in The Batman Adventures Annual #1 (DC Comics) | Paul Dini and John Byrne | Nominee | |
| 1995 | "The Lot" in Vertigo Rave (DC Comics/Vertigo Comics) | John Ney Rieber and Gary Amaro | Nominee | |
| 1995 | "The Virgin" in Wild Life #1 (Fantagraphics) | Peter Kuper | Nominee | |
| 1995 | "We Can Get Them For You Wholesale" in Negative Burn #11 (Caliber Press) | based on a story by Neil Gaiman, adapted by Joe Pruett and Ken Meyer Jr. | Nominee | |
| 1996 | "The Eltingville Comic-Book, Science-Fiction, Fantasy, Horror, and Role-Playing Club in Bring Me the Head of Boba Fett" in Instant Piano #3 (Dark Horse Comics) | Evan Dorkin | Winner | |
| 1996 | "Caricature" in Eightball #15 (Fantagraphics) | Dan Clowes | Nominee | |
| 1996 | "Horsing Around with History" in Uncle Scrooge Adventures #33 (Gladstone Publishing) | Carl Barks and William Van Horn | Nominee | |
| 1996 | "Jimmy Corrigan" in BLAB! #8 (Kitchen Sink Press) | Chris Ware | Nominee | |
| 1996 | "Klingon Battle Helmet" in Confessions of a Cereal Eater (NBM Publishing) | Rob Maisch and Scott Hampton | Nominee | |
| 1996 | "Pink Frosting" in Optic Nerve #2 (Drawn & Quarterly) | Adrian Tomine | Nominee | |
| 1997 | "Heroes" in Batman Black and White #4 (DC Comics) | Archie Goodwin and Gary Gianni | Winner | |
| 1997 | "Gentlemanhog" in Frank #1 (Fantagraphics) | Jim Woodring | Nominee | |
| 1997 | "Joy Ride" in Joy Ride and Other Stories (Kitchen Sink Press) | Carol Lay | Nominee | |
| 1997 | "The Nearness of You" in Wizard Presents Kurt Busiek's Astro City vol. 2 #1/2 (Homage Comics/Wizard Press) | Kurt Busiek | Nominee | |
| 1997 | "Oracle — Year One: Born of Hope" in The Batman Chronicles #5 (DC Comics) | John Ostrander, Kim Yale, Brian Stelfreeze, and Karl Story | Nominee | |
| 1997 | "Perpetual Mourning" in Batman Black and White #1 (DC Comics) | Ted McKeever | Nominee | |
| 1998 | "The Eltingville Comic-Book, Science-Fiction, Fantasy, Horror, and Role-Playing Club In: The Marathon Men" in Dork! #4 (Slave Labor Graphics) | Evan Dorkin | Winner | |
| 1998 | "A Matter of Some Gravity" in Walt Disney's Comics and Stories #610 (Gladstone Publishing) | Don Rosa | Nominee | |
| 1998 | "The New European" in Vampirella/Dracula: The Centennial (Harris Publications) | Alan Moore, Gary Frank, and Cam Smith | Nominee | |
| 1998 | "Penny Century" in Penny Century #1 (Fantagraphics) | Jaime Hernandez | Nominee | |
| 1998 | "The Willow Warriors" in Weird War Tales #1 (DC Comics) | Ian Edginton and Eric Shanower | Nominee | |
| 1998 | "Wrong Turn" in Sin City: Sex & Violence (Dark Horse Comics) | Frank Miller | Nominee | |
| 1999 | "Devil's Advocate" in Grendel: Black, White, and Red #1 (Dark Horse Comics) | Matt Wagner and Tim Sale | Winner | |
| 1999 | "Electric China Death" in Gangland #4 (DC Comics/Vertigo Comics) | Richard Bruning and Mark Chiarello | Nominee | |
| 1999 | "The Illustrative Man" in Treehouse of Horror #4 (Bongo Comics) | Batton Lash, Julius Priete and Tim Bavington | Nominee | |
| 1999 | "Invincible Man and Nifty Boy" in Flaming Carrot's Greatest Hits vol. 3 (Dark Horse Comics) | Bob Burden | Nominee | |
| 1999 | "Whhyyyyyy? (Oh God Why?)" in The 3 Geeks #4 (3 Finger Prints) | Rich Koslowski | Nominee | |
2000s
| 2000 | "Letitia Lerner, Superman's Babysitter" in Elseworlds 80-Page Giant (DC Comics) | Kyle Baker and Elizabeth Glass | Winner | |
| 2000 | "Bye-Bye, Muffy" in Naughty Bits #28 (Fantagraphics) | Roberta Gregory | Nominee | |
| 2000 | "Cluttered Like My Head" in Dork! #7 (Slave Labor Graphics) | Evan Dorkin | Nominee | |
| 2000 | "How Things Work Out (Greyshirt)" in Tomorrow Stories #2 (America's Best Comics) | Alan Moore and Rick Veitch | Nominee | |
| 2000 | "Margolis" in Jetlag (Actus Tragicus) | Etgar Keret and Yirmi Pinkus | Nominee | |
| 2000 | "Orange Glow" in Dark Horse Presents Annual 1999 (Dark Horse Comics) | Paul Chadwick | Nominee | |
| 2000 | "The Unbearableness of Being Light (Jack B. Quick)" in Tomorrow Stories #2 (America's Best Comics) | Alan Moore and Kevin Nowlan | Nominee | |
| 2001 | "The Gorilla Suit" in Streetwise (TwoMorrows Publishing) | Sergio Aragonés | Winner | |
| 2001 | "The Fisherman and the Sea Princess" in Little Lit (HarperCollins) | David Mazzucchelli | Nominee | |
| 2001 | "Monsieur Jean" in Drawn & Quarterly vol. 3 (Drawn & Quarterly) | Philippe Dupuy and Charles Berberian | Nominee | |
| 2001 | "A Prayer to the Sun" in Weird War Tales Special (Vertigo Comics/DC Comics) | Edvin Biuković and Darko Macan | Nominee | |
| 2001 | "Prince Rooster" in Little Lit (HarperCollins) | Art Spiegelman | Nominee | |
| 2002 | "The Eltingville Club in 'The Intervention'" in Dork! #9 (Slave Labor Graphics) | Evan Dorkin | Winner | |
| 2002 | "The Adventures of Hergé" in Drawn & Quarterly vol. 4 (Drawn & Quarterly) | Jose-Louis Bocquet, Jean-Luc Fromental, and Stanislas Barthélémy | Nominee | |
| 2002 | "His Story" in Bento #1 and Pictures That Tick (Hourglass Studios/Allen Spiegel Fine Arts) | Dave McKean | Nominee | |
| 2002 | "Me and Edith Head" in Cicada vol. 4 no. 1 (Carus Publishing) | Sara Ryan and Steve Lieber | Nominee | |
| 2002 | "Oh To Celebrate" in Drawn & Quarterly vol. 4 (Drawn & Quarterly) | Miriam Katin | Nominee | |
| 2002 | "The Willful Death of a Stereotype" in Expo 2001 (The Expo) | Chris Staros and Bo Hampton | Nominee | |
| 2003 | "The Magician and the Snake" in Dark Horse Maverick: Happy Endings (Dark Horse Comics) | Katie Mignola and Mike Mignola | Winner | |
| 2003 | "Between Two Worlds: The Strange and Sad Story of Erich Wolfgang Korngold" in The Comics Journal Summer Special 2002 (Fantagraphics) | P. Craig Russell | Nominee | |
| 2003 | "Green Tea" in Orchid (Sparkplug Comics) | Sheridan Le Fanu, adapted by Kevin Huizenga | Nominee | |
| 2003 | "Untitled (first story in book)" in Sshhhh! (Fantagraphics) | Jason | Nominee | |
| 2003 | "Telekinetic" in Bipolar #3 (Alternative Comics) | Tomer Hanuka | Nominee | |
| 2004 | "Death" in The Sandman: Endless Nights (Vertigo Comics/DC Comics) | Neil Gaiman and P. Craig Russell | Winner | |
| 2004 | "It Was a Dark and Silly Night . . ." in Little Lit: It Was a Dark and Silly Night (HarperCollins) | Lemony Snicket and Richard Sala | Nominee | |
| 2004 | "It Was a Dark and Silly Night" in Little Lit: It Was a Dark and Silly Night (HarperCollins) | Carlos Nine | Nominee | |
| 2004 | "Monsieur Jean" in Drawn & Quarterly vol. 5 (Drawn & Quarterly) | Philippe Dupuy and Charles Berberian | Nominee | |
| 2004 | "Same Difference" in Same Difference and Other Stories (Small Stories) | Derek Kirk Kim | Nominee | |
| 2004 | "There Are No Flowers in the Real World" in The Matrix Comics (Burlyman Entertainment) | David Lapham | Nominee | |
| 2005 | "Unfamiliar" in The Dark Horse Book of Witchcraft (Dark Horse Comics) | Evan Dorkin and Jill Thompson | Winner | |
| 2005 | "Eve O'Twins" in Rosetta 2 (Alternative Comics) | Craig Thompson | Nominee | |
| 2005 | "Glenn Ganges: Jeepers Jacobs" in Kramers Ergot 5 (Gingko Press) | Kevin Huizenga | Nominee | |
| 2005 | "God (story on wrap-around dust jacket)" in McSweeney's Quarterly #13 (McSweeney's) | Chris Ware | Nominee | |
| 2005 | "The Price" in Creatures of the Night (Dark Horse Comics) | Neil Gaiman and Michael Zulli | Nominee | |
| 2005 | "Where Monsters Dine" in Common Grounds #5 (Top Cow Productions/Image Comics) | Troy Hickman, Angel Medina, and Jon Holdredge | Nominee | |
| 2006 | "Teenage Sidekick" in Solo #3 (DC Comics) | Paul Pope | Winner | |
| 2006 | "Blood Son" in Doomed #1 (IDW Publishing) | Richard Matheson, adapted by Chris Ryall and Ashley Wood | Nominee | |
| 2006 | "Monster Slayers" in Flight vol. 2 (Image Comics) | Khang Le | Nominee | |
| 2006 | "Nameless" in The Goon #14 (Dark Horse Comics) | Eric Powell | Nominee | |
| 2006 | "Operation (story La Mano)" in The Recidivist #3 (La Mano) | Zak Sally | Nominee | |
| 2007 | "A Frog's Eye View" in Fables: 1001 Nights of Snowfall (Vertigo Comics/DC Comics) | Bill Willingham and James Jean | Winner | |
| 2007 | "The Black Knight Glorps Again" in Uncle Scrooge #354 (Gemstone Publishing) | Don Rosa | Nominee | |
| 2007 | "Felix" in Drawn & Quarterly Showcase 4 (Drawn & Quarterly) | Gabrielle Bell | Nominee | |
| 2007 | "Old Oak Trees" in Flight vol. 3 (Ballantine Books) | Tony Cliff | Nominee | |
| 2007 | "Stan Lee Meets Spider-Man" in Stan Lee Meets Spider-Man (Marvel Comics) | Stan Lee, Olivier Coipel, and Mark Morales | Nominee | |
| 2007 | "Willie: Portrait of a Groundskeeper" in Bart Simpsons's Treehouse of Horror #12 (Bongo Comics) | Eric Powell | Nominee | |
| 2008 | "Mr. Wonderful" in New York Times Sunday Magazine (The New York Times) | Dan Clowes | Winner | |
| 2008 | "Book" in New Engineering (PictureBox) | Yuichi Yokoyama | Nominee | |
| 2008 | "At Loose Ends" in Mome #8 (Fantagraphics) | Lewis Trondheim | Nominee | |
| 2008 | "Town of Evening Calm" in Town of Evening Calm, Country of Cherry Blossoms (Last Gasp) | Fumiyo Kōno | Nominee | |
| 2008 | "Whatever Happened to Fletcher Hanks?" in I Shall Destroy All the Civilized Planets! (Fantagraphics) | Paul Karasik | Nominee | |
| 2008 | "Young Americans" in Mome #8 (Fantagraphics) | Émile Bravo | Nominee | |
| 2009 | "Murder He Wrote" in The Simpsons' Treehouse of Horror #14 (Bongo Comics) | Ian Boothby, Nina Matsumoto, and Andrew Pepoy | Winner | |
| 2009 | "Actual Size" in Kramers Ergot 7 (Buenaventura Press) | Chris Ware | Nominee | |
| 2009 | "Chechen War, Chechen Women" in I Live Here (Pantheon Books) | Joe Sacco | Nominee | |
| 2009 | "Freaks" in Superior Showcase #3 (AdHouse Books) | Laura Park | Nominee | |
| 2009 | "Glenn Ganges in ‘Pulverize" in Ganges #2 (Fantagraphics) | Kevin Huizenga | Nominee | |
2010s
| 2010 | "Urgent Request" in The Eternal Smile (First Second Books) | Gene Luen Yang and Derek Kirk Kim | Winner | |
| 2010 | "Because I Love You So Much" in From Wonderland with Love: Danish Comics the 3rd Millennium (Fantagraphics/Aben malen) | Nikoline Werdelin | Nominee | |
| 2010 | "Gentleman John" in What Is Torch Tiger? (Torch Tiger) | Nathan Greno | Nominee | |
| 2010 | "How and Why to Bale Hay" in Syncopated (Villard Books) | Nick Bertozzi | Nominee | |
| 2010 | "Hurricane" in Bob Dylan Revisited (W. W. Norton & Company) | interpreted by Gradimir Smudja | Nominee | |
| 2011 | "Post Mortem" in I Am an Avenger #2 (Marvel Comics) | Greg Rucka and Michael Lark | Winner | |
| 2011 | "Bart on the Fourth of July" in Bart Simpson #54 (Bongo Comics) | Peter Kuper | Nominee | |
| 2011 | "Batman in Trick for the Scarecrow" in DCU Halloween Special 2010 (DC Comics) | Billy Tucci | Nominee | |
| 2011 | "Cinderella" in Fractured Fables (Silverline Books/Image Comics) | Nick Spencer and Rodin Esquejo | Nominee | |
| 2011 | "Hamburgers for One" in Popgun vol. 4 (Image Comics) | Frank Stockton | Nominee | |
| 2011 | "Little Red Riding Hood" in Fractured Fables (Silverline Books/Image Comics) | Bryan Talbot and Camilla d'Errico | Nominee | |
| 2012 | "The Seventh" in Richard Stark's Parker: The Martini Edition (IDW Publishing) | Darwyn Cooke | Winner | |
| 2012 | "A Brief History of the Art Form Known as Hortisculpture" in Optic Nerve #12 (Drawn & Quarterly) | Adrian Tomine | Nominee | |
| 2012 | "Harvest of Fear" in The Simpsons' Treehouse of Horror #17 (Bongo Comics) | Jim Woodring | Nominee | |
| 2012 | "The Phototaker" in Metal Hurlant vol. 2 (Humanoids Publishing) | Guy Davis | Nominee | |
| 2012 | "The Speaker" in Dark Horse Presents #7 (Dark Horse Comics) | Brandon Graham | Nominee | |
| 2013 | "Moon 1969: The True Story of the 1969 Moon Launch" in Tales Designed to Thrizzle#8 (Fantagraphics) | Michael Kupperman | Winner | |
| 2013 | "A Birdsong Shatters the Still" in Injury #4 (Ted May/Alternative Comics) | Jeff Wilson and Ted May | Nominee | |
| 2013 | "Elmview" in Dockwood (Nobrow Press) | Jon McNaught | Nominee | |
| 2013 | "Moving Forward" in Monsters Miracles & Mayonnaise (Epigram Books) | drewscape | Nominee | |
| 2013 | "Rainbow Moment" in Heads or Tails (Fantagraphics) | Lilli Carré | Nominee | |
| 2014 | "Untitled" in Love and Rockets: New Stories #6 (Fantagraphics) | Gilbert Hernandez | Winner | |
| 2014 | "Go Owls" in Optic Nerve #13 (Drawn & Quarterly) | Adrian Tomine | Nominee | |
| 2014 | "Mars to Stay" in The Witching Hour (DC Comics) | Brett Lewis and Cliff Chiang | Nominee | |
| 2014 | "Seaside Home" in Habit #1 (Oily Comics) | Josh Simmons | Nominee | |
| 2014 | "When Your House Is Burning Down You Should Brush Your Teeth" in The Oatmeal | Matthew Inman | Nominee | |
| 2015 | "When the Darkness Presses" | Emily Carroll | Winner | |
| 2015 | "Beginning's End" in Mutha Magazine | Rina Ayuyang | Nominee | |
| 2015 | "Corpse on the Imjin!" in Masterful Marks: Cartoonists Who Changed the World (Simon & Schuster) | Peter Kuper | Nominee | |
| 2015 | "Rule Number One" in Batman Black and White #3 (DC Comics) | Lee Bermejo | Nominee | |
| 2015 | "The Sound of One Hand Clapping" in Adventures of Superman #14 (DC Comics) | Max Landis and Jock | Nominee | |
| 2016 | "Killing and Dying" in Optic Nerve #14 (Drawn & Quarterly) | Adrian Tomine | Winner | |
| 2016 | "Black Death in America" in Vertigo Quarterly CMYK #4: Black (Vertigo Comics/DC Comics) | Tom King and John Paul Leon | Nominee | |
| 2016 | "Hand Me Down" in 24 x 7 (Fanfare) | Kristyna Baczynski | Nominee | |
| 2016 | "It's Going to Be Okay" in The Oatmeal (theoatmeal.com/comics/plane | Matthew Inman | Nominee | |
| 2016 | "Lion and Mouse" in Fable Comics (First Second Books) | R. Sikoryak | Nominee | |
| 2017 | "Good Boy" in Batman Annual #1 (DC Comics) | Tom King and David Finch | Winner | |
| 2017 | "The Comics Wedding of the Century" in We Told You So: Comics as Art (Fantagraphics) | Simon Hanselmann | Nominee | |
| 2017 | "The Dark Nothing" in Uptight #5 (Fantagraphics) | Jordan Crane | Nominee | |
| 2017 | "Monday" in One Week in The Library (Image Comics) | W. Maxwell Prince and John Amor | Nominee | |
| 2017 | "Mostly Saturn" in Island #8 (Image Comics) | Michael DeForge | Nominee | |
| 2017 | "Shrine of the Monkey God!" in Kramers Ergot 9 (Fantagraphics) | Kim Deitch | Nominee | |
| 2018 | "A Life in Comics: The Graphic Adventures of Karen Green" in Columbia Magazine, Summer 2017 (Columbia University) | Nick Sousanis | Winner | |
| 2018 | "Ethel Byrne" in Mine: A Celebration of Liberty and Freedom for All Benefiting Planned Parenthood (ComicMix) | Cecil Castellucci and Scott Chantler | Nominee | |
| 2018 | "Forgotten Princess" in Adventure Time #13 (KaBOOM!) | Phillip Kennedy Johnson and Antonio Sandoval | Nominee | |
| 2018 | "Small Mistakes Make Big Problems" in Comics for Choice (Hazel Newlevant) | Sophia Foster-Dimino | Nominee | |
| 2018 | "Trans Plant" in Enough Space for Everyone Else (Bedside Press) | Megan Rose Gedris | Nominee | |
| 2019 | "The Talk of the Saints" in Swamp Thing Winter Special (DC Comics) | Tom King and Jason Fabok | Winner | |
| 2019 | "Get Naked in Barcelona" in Get Naked (Image Comics) | Steven T. Seagle and Emei Olivia Burrell | Nominee | |
| 2019 | "The Ghastlygun Tinies" in Mad #4 (DC Comics) | Matt Cohen and Marc Palm | Nominee | |
| 2019 | "Here I Am" in I Feel Machine (SelfMadeHero) | Shaun Tan | Nominee | |
| 2019 | "Life During Interesting Times" in The Nib | Mike Dawson | Nominee | |
| 2019 | "Supply Chains" in Coin-Op #7 (Coin-Op Books) | Peter Hoey and Maria Hoey | Nominee | |
2020s
| 2020 | "Hot Comb" in Hot Comb (Drawn & Quarterly) | Ebony Flowers | Winner | |
| 2020 | "How to Draw a Horse" in The New Yorker | Emma Hunsinger | Nominee | |
| 2020 | "The Menopause" in The Believer | Mira Jacob | Nominee | |
| 2020 | "Who Gets Called an 'Unfit' Mother?" in The Nib | Miriam Libicki | Nominee | |
| 2020 | "You're Not Going to Believe What I'm About to Tell You" in The Oatmeal | Matthew Inman | Nominee | |
| 2021 | "When the Menopausal Carnival Comes to Town" in Menopause: A Comic Treatment (Graphic Medicine/Penn State University Press) | Mimi Pond | Winner | |
| 2021 | "Garden Boys" in Now #8 (Fantagraphics) | Henry McCausland | Nominee | |
| 2021 | "I Needed the Discounts" in The New York Times | Connor Willumsen | Nominee | |
| 2021 | "Parts of Us" in Elements: Earth A Comic Anthology by Creators of Color (Ascend Press) | Chan Chau | Nominee | |
| 2021 | "Rookie" in Detective Comics #1027 (DC Comics) | Greg Rucka and Eduardo Risso | Nominee | |
| 2021 | "Soft Lead" | Chan Chau | Nominee | |
| 2022 | "Funeral in Foam" in You Died: An Anthology of the Afterlife (Iron Circus) | Casey Gilly and Raina Telgemeier | Winner | |
| 2022 | "Generations" in Superman: Red and Blue #5 (DC Comics) | Daniel Warren Johnson | Nominee | |
| 2022 | "I Wanna Be a Slob" in Too Tough to Die (Birdcage Bottom Books) | Steven Arnold and Michael Kamison | Nominee | |
| 2022 | "Tap, Tap, Tap" in Green Arrow 80th Anniversary (DC Comics) | Larry O'Neil and Jorge Fornés | Nominee | |
| 2022 | "Trickster, Traitor, Dummy, Doll" in The Nib Vol 9: Secrets (The Nib) | Triple Dream (Mel Hilario, Katie Longua, and Lauren Davis) | Nominee | |
| 2023 | "Finding Batman" in DC Pride 2022 (DC Comics) | Kevin Conroy and J. Bone | Winner | |
| 2023 | "Good Morning," in Moon Knight: Black, White & Blood #4 (Marvel) | Christopher Cantwell and Alex Lins | Nominee | |
| 2023 | "The Beekeeper's Due" in Scott Snyder Presents: Tales from the Cloakroom (Cloakroom Comics) | Jimmy Stamp and Débora Santos | Nominee | |
| 2023 | "Silent All These Years," in Tori Amos: Little Earthquakes (Z2) | Margaret Atwood and David Mack | Nominee | |
| 2023 | "You Get It," in Amazing Fantasy #1000 (Marvel) | Jonathan Hickman and Marco Checchetto | Nominee | |
| 2024 | "The Kelpie" in Four Gathered on Christmas Eve (Dark Horse Comics) | Becky Cloonan | Winner | |
| 2024 | "The Lady of the Lake" in BUMP: A Horror Anthology #3 (BUMP) | Joe S. Farrar and Guilherme Grandizolli | Nominee | |
| 2024 | "Talking to a Hill" in Comics for Ukraine (Zoop) | Larry Hancock and Michael Cherkas | Nominee | |
| 2024 | "World's Finest, Part 1" in Wonder Woman #3 (DC Comics) | Tom King and Belen Ortega | Nominee | |
| 2024 | "Friendship is Forever" in My Little Pony 40th Celebration (IDW) | Sam Maggs and Keisha Okafor | Nominee | |
| 2025 | "Spaces" in DC Pride 2024 (DC Comics) | Phil Jimenez | Winner | |
| 2025 | "You Cannot Live on Bread Alone" in NOW #13 (Fantagraphics) | Kayla E. | Nominee | |
| 2025 | "Pig" in NOW #13 (Fantagraphics) | Stacy Gougoulis | Nominee | |
| 2025 | "Anything Sinister" in NOW #13 (Fantagraphics) | Ross Murray | Nominee | |
| 2025 | "Day 1703" in Smoke Signal #43 (Desert Island Comics) | Chris Ware | Nominee | |
| 2025 | "Water I've Loved: Moving Day" in MUTHA Magazine | Pam Wye | Nominee | |
| 2026 | "Blood Harvest" in Brain Damage (Fantagraphics) | Shintaro Kago, translated by Zack Davisson | Winner | |
| 2026 | "The Curse Room" in Brain Damage (Fantagraphics) | Shintaro Kago, translated by Zack Davisson | Nominee | |
| 2026 | "Football is Not War" in Come Out and Play: The Queer Sports Project (Stacked Deck Press) | R.K. Russell, Wilfred Santiago | Nominee | |
| 2026 | "Red Snapper in the Rea" in Milk White Steed (Drawn & Quarterly) | Michael D. Kennedy | Nominee | |
| 2026 | "trAPPed" (Bloomberg News) | Anand RK, Suparna Sharma, Natalie Obiko Pearson | Nominee | |
