= Welcome to Eltingville =

Television pilot

- The title card featuring the four members of the Eltingville club. From the left: Jerry, Bill, Josh, and Pete.
- Created by: Evan Dorkin
- Based on: Eltingville: Bring Me the Head of Boba Fett by Evan Dorkin
- Written by: Evan Dorkin
- Directed by: Chuck Sheetz
- Voices of: Jason Harris; Troy Metcalf; Larc Spies; Corey Brill; Tara Sands; Glenn Jones; Christopher Ward; Alicia Sedwick; Evan Dorkin
- Theme music composer: The Aquabats
- Ending theme: "Welcome to Eltingville" performed by The Aquabats
- Composer: Denis M. Hannigan
- Countries of origin: United States; Japan (animation production)
- Original language: English

Production
- Executive producers: Evan Dorkin; Sarah Dyer
- Running time: 22 minutes
- Production companies: Cartoon Network Studios; Tama Production

Original release
- Network: Adult Swim
- Release: March 3, 2002

Welcome to Eltingville is an American adult animated comedy pilot created by Evan Dorkin, as an adaptation of his comic book series Eltingville. It premiered in the United States on March 3, 2002 on Cartoon Network's late night programming block Adult Swim, but was not picked up for a full series.

Welcome to Eltingville takes place in Eltingville, Staten Island, and focuses on the lives of four teenage boys: Bill Dickey, Josh Levy, Pete DiNunzio and Jerry Stokes, all members of "The Eltingville Club", who have shared interests in comic books and science fiction, among other things. The pilot is an adaptation of the 1995 Eltingville story Bring Me the Head of Boba Fett, in which Bill and Josh get into a fight over a collectible Boba Fett action figure.

== Plot ==
The members of the Eltingville Club, Bill Dickey, Josh Levy, Pete DiNunzio and Jerry Stokes, get into a fight while playing Dungeons & Dragons. Their commotion wakes up Bill's mom, who warns them to be quiet. Another fight breaks out shortly after when a VHS tape that Josh bought online, said to contain bootleg scenes of actresses, really has The Hair Bear Bunch! on it (which means Josh got conned). Bill's mom kicks out his friends and Bill kicks Josh out of the club. The next day, Bill awakes from a nightmare which he calls a "freaky premonition," and decides to let Josh back into the club. After a day out on the town, the boys end their day at a comic book shop, where Bill and Josh become captivated with an unopened Kenner 12-inch action figure of Boba Fett and compete in a trivia contest for it. Despite Bill winning, they continue their dispute, wreaking havoc in the process. They both race home to steal their parents' money and race back to the store. Bill and Josh present their payments to the clerk, Joe, with a check and credit cards, respectively, but he rejects both of them. They resume fighting and end up breaking the action figure. Outraged, Joe kicks all four of them out of the store. Bill angrily walks away with Fett's head and leaves Josh with the body as he weeps on the ground. Willoughby, a boy from the store, ends the episode by breaking the fourth wall, asking, "Is this the end of the Eltingville Club?"

== Production and broadcast ==
The pilot episode, "Bring Me the Head of Boba Fett", was written by Evan Dorkin, storyboarded by Stephen DeStefano, and directed by Chuck Sheetz. It was rated as TV-14 in the United States for comic violence, crude sexual references (including sexualized depictions of women), and moderate offensive language. It was produced by Cartoon Network Studios. Production on the episode was officially completed in January 24, 2001 with animation handled by Tama Production in Tokyo, Japan. The pilot was based on Dorkin's time as a comic book store employee at Jim Hanley's Universe in Eltingville, Staten Island. The pilot's story line was partially based upon the comic book story of the same name and the pilot's theme opening and closing themes were written and performed by The Aquabats.

Dorkin took on a large role in the pilot's creation and has since stated that if he could have re-done the episode, he would have chosen to delegate more work and to choose an Eltingville story that would show off more of the series' potential and characters. If the series had been picked up for further episodes or a miniseries, potential plot lines for episodes would have included a "Klingon vs. Elf war" between a local Klingon camp and a Renaissance fair, as well as the club members digging through the Staten Island landfill for a collectible item that was mistakenly thrown out.

The pilot episode was originally aired in the United States on Cartoon Network's late night programming block Adult Swim on March 3, 2002, and was originally promoted as a "special" by Adult Swim. It has since been re-aired periodically on Adult Swim since its original premiere, including twice on Halloween night on October 31, 2007 as part of an advertised "Halloween Stunt" night.

== Cast ==
- Jason Harris as Bill Dickey, a comic book fan and the President of the Eltingville Club.
- Troy Metcalf as Josh Levy, a science fiction fan and a member of the club who frequently fights with Bill.
- Larc Spies as Pete DiNunzio, a horror movie addict.
- Corey Brill as Jerry Stokes, a fantasy fan and the group's Dungeon Master.
- Tara Sands as Jane Dickey and Jack, Bill's sister and a Pokémon fanatic, respectively.
- Christopher Ward as Ward Willoughby, an unlucky boy who is hated by all four members of the Eltingville Club despite him wishing to be friends with them.
- Glenn Jones as Joe, the owner of a comic book store.
- Alicia Sedwick as Mrs. Dickey and Mrs. Levy, the unseen mothers of Bill and Jane Dickey and Josh Levy, respectively.
- Evan Dorkin as Ironjaw, a red head with braces who annoys the Eltingville Club with his spit talking.

== Reception ==
Animation World Network and Ain't It Cool News both praised the pilot episode, and Ain't It Cool News complimented the show on its geek humor, which they considered to be fairly accurate and funny.

== See also ==
- List of television series canceled before airing an episode
