= Antz (soundtrack) =

1998 film soundtrack album

Antz (Original Motion Picture Soundtrack)

Film score by Harry Gregson-Williams and John Powell
- Released: November 3, 1998
- Recorded: 1998
- Studios: AIR Lyndhurst Hall, London; Media Ventures, Santa Monica, California
- Genre: Film score
- Length: 49:02
- Label: Angel
- Producer: Hans Zimmer

Harry Gregson-Williams chronology
The Replacement Killers (1998)	Antz (1998)	Enemy of the State (1998)

John Powell chronology
Endurance (1998)	Antz (1998)	Chill Factor (1999)

Antz (Original Motion Picture Soundtrack) is the soundtrack album composed by Harry Gregson-Williams and John Powell for the film of the same name and released by Angel Records on November 3, 1998.

The soundtrack received positive reviews and was nominated for Annie Award for Outstanding Achievement for Music in a Feature Production at the 27th Annie Awards.

== Background and release ==
The chief executive officer (CEO) of DreamWorks, Jeffrey Katzenberg, initially wanted Hans Zimmer to compose the music for Antz, but as Zimmer had already committed to The Prince of Egypt among other projects, he instead suggested two other composers from his company Media Ventures. Craig Armstrong and Marius de Vries were the initial contenders for scoring Antz, but Zimmer suggested either Harry Gregson-Williams or John Powell to compose the music, as both of them had already collaborated on Egypt. The duo initially wrote some demos and themes for the film, which impressed Katzenberg, resulting in both of them being hired for the project in a collaborative effort. Antz is one of the first three films, with both Gregson-Williams and Powell had collaboratively composed for, the other two being Chicken Run (2000) and Shrek (2001), both DreamWorks Animation films.

The film score album was released, a month after the film's North American theatrical run on November 3, 1998, through Angel Records. Though, DreamWorks' own subsidiary label DreamWorks Records, which founded in 1997, had released score albums for their initial live-action productions (The Peacemaker and Amistad) the label, however did not release the score for Antz, and licensed score albums to other labels as it was primarily focusing on albums by pop and rock artists at that time, other than film albums. Despite this, DreamWorks Records had however released the soundtrack for The Prince of Egypt later that year.

== Track listing ==
All music is composed by Harry Gregson-Williams and John Powell, except as noted.

No.	Title	Performer	Length
1.	"I Can See Clearly Now"	Neil Finn	2:51
2.	"Opening Titles / Z's Theme"		1:59
3.	"The Colony"		1:57
4.	"General Mandible"		2:22
5.	"Princess Bala"		0:56
6.	"The Bar"		1:29
7.	"There Is A Better Place..."		1:20
8.	"Guantanamera / 6:15 Time To Dance"		3:17
9.	"The Antz Go Marching To War"		3:49
10.	"Weaver And Azteca Flirt"		1:56
11.	"The Death Of Barbados*"		2:07
12.	"The Antz Marching Band"		1:17
13.	"The Magnifying Glass"		1:59
14.	"Ant Revolution"		1:50
15.	"Mandible And Cutter Plot"		2:07
16.	"The Picnic Table"		2:45
17.	"The Big Shoe"		2:11
18.	"Romance In Insectopia"		2:32
19.	"Back To The Colony"		2:28
20.	"Z To The Rescue"		7:46
21.	"Z's Alive!"		3:28
Total length:			52:26

- Contrary to the track title, the character's name is actually "Barbatus".

== Reception ==
Christian Clemmensen of Filmtracks wrote "Overall, Powell and Gregson-Williams may not have been in top form by 1998, but Antz has fifteen or so minutes of truly magical and addictive personality more cohesive and enjoyable than Danny Elfman's similar attempts at the time. Just make sure you're in the mood." William Ruhlmann of AllMusic wrote "most of the music is purely functional in a film that itself has many moods and varied episodes. Still, this makes for lively listening."

Thomas Glorieux of Maintitles wrote "There is no denying it. Everyone that simply wants fun music will do fine with Antz. It was the start of a trio of amazing animated musical scores, making sure that from there on everyone went their own separate way. But the big reason this score still sounds so amazing is the continuation of surprises. It makes it fresh and exciting during each annual listen. In the end Antz deserved that nomination more than Randy Newman's A Bug's Life. And above all it offers us just a glimpse of what Media Ventures in general produced. Don't deny it, simply accept the way of life. Antz is one of the biggest and best listens of 1998."

Todd McCarthy of Variety added that "The energetic and resourceful background score by Harry Gregson-Williams and John Powell is abetted by several standards that are used in markedly witty ways."

== Personnel ==
Credits adapted from liner notes:

- Music composer – Harry Gregson-Williams, John Powell
- Music producer – Hans Zimmer
- Recording – Nick Wollage, Steve Orchard
- Assistant recording – Jake Jackson, Matt Palmer
- Mixing – Nick Wollage, Alan Meyerson
- Assistant mixing – Gregg Silk
- Mastering – Joe Gastwirt
- Supervising music editor – Adam Smalley
- Music editor – Brian Richards
- Music coordinator – Maggie Rodford
- Copyist – Tony Stanton
- A&R (Angel Records) – Steve Ferrera
- Project manager (Angel Records) – Zach Hochkeppel
- Executive in charge of music – Todd Homme, Marylata E. Jacob
- Art direction (Angel Records) – Gordon H Jee
- Package design (Angel Records) – Eileen Preston

Orchestra

- Orchestrators – Bruce L. Fowler, Elizabeth Finch, Jack Smalley, Ladd MacIntosh, March Dicterow-Vaj, Steven Fowler, Walt Fowler, Yvonne S. Moriarty
- Orchestra conductor – Gavin Greenaway
- Orchestra leader – Perry Montague Mason
- Orchestra contractor – Tonia Davall

Instruments

- Antelope horns – Oren Marshall
- Bass – Chris Lawrence
- Crumhorn – Brian Gulland
- Drums – Ian Thomas, Steve Orchard, Matt Palmer
- Elephant horns – Oren Marshall
- Flute – Jonathan Snowden
- Harp – Skaila Kanga
- Marimba – Frank Ricotti
- Percussion – Louis Jardim, Bob Daspit, Ryeland Allison
- Loops – Bob Daspit, Ryeland Allison
- Saxophone – Phil Todd

Vocals

- Choir conductor – Rupert Gregson-Williams
- Vocals – Kenny Andrews, Marcos D'Cruze, Michael Dmitri, Janet Mooney, Nicole Tibbles

== Accolades ==
Award	Category	Recipient(s)	Result
1999 ASCAP Film and Television Music Awards	Top Box Office Films	Harry Gregson-Williams, John Powell	Won
27th Annie Awards	Outstanding Individual Achievement for Music in an Animated Feature Production	Harry Gregson-Williams, John Powell	Nominated
1999 Golden Reel Awards	Best Sound Editing in Animated Feature Film — Music Editing	Adam Milo Smalley, Brian Richards	Won
