= Hellboy: The Troll Witch and Others =

- Trade Paperback Cover

Publication information
- Publisher: Dark Horse Comics
- Format: Trade Paperback
- Publication date: October 3, 2007
- Main characters: Hellboy; Kate Corrigan; Roger; Abe Sapien; Liz Sherman

Creative team
- Created by: Mike Mignola
- Written by: Mike Mignola
- Artists: Mike Mignola; P. Craig Russell; Richard Corben
- Letterers: Clem Robins; Galen Showman; Pat Brosseau
- Colorists: Dave Stewart; Lovern Kindzierski
- Editor: Scott Allie

Collected editions
- 'Hellboy: The Troll Witch and Others': ISBN 978-1-59307-860-7

Hellboy: The Troll Witch and Others is the seventh trade paperback collection in the Hellboy series (created by Mike Mignola) and published by Dark Horse Comics on October 3, 2007. It collects various mini-series, one-shots and back-up features featuring fictional paranormal detective Hellboy.

== Publication history ==
=== The Penanggalan ===
Cover by Mignola.

This story by Mike Mignola was originally published by Dark Horse Comics and Wizard Press as the lead story in Hellboy Premier Edition (March 2004) along with B.P.R.D.: Born Again which was a promotional for Wizard available in three different covers:

- A photographic cover was available to those who pre-ordered tickets to Wizard World Los Angeles 2004.
- A cover drawn by Guy Davis was available via a special offer to renew or subscribe to Wizard.
- A Mike Mignola-drawn cover was available via a mail-in offer found in Wizard #148.

The edition also included some pages from a sketchbook of monsters Mignola drew for pleasure during his spare time while assisting on the pre-production of the Hellboy movie in Prague.

Hellboy travels to Malaysia in 1958 where a village devoid of Bomah shamans has fallen victim to a demonic penanggalan. A young guide leads him to the demon's cave, where Hellboy is met with a betrayal.

=== The Hydra and the Lion ===
This story by Mike Mignola was originally published in one-shot anthology The Dark Horse Book of Monsters (December 13, 2006).

Hellboy travels to Alaska in 1961, where he finds not only the grave of the recently deceased Hercules (who lived out the final years of his life in anonymity as a school janitor) but a monstrous hydra. Hellboy's battle with the creature is interrupted by a mysterious lion girl that generates more than a few theories amongst the experts of the B.P.R.D.

=== The Troll Witch ===
This story by Mike Mignola was originally published in one-shot anthology The Dark Horse Book of Witchcraft (July 7, 2004).

Hellboy travels to Norway in 1963 to seek the legendary troll witch, who, armed with only a wooden spoon, had ridden into battle against a group of trolls on the back of a goat.

=== Dr. Carp's Experiment ===
This story by Mike Mignola was originally published in one-shot anthology The Dark Horse Book of Hauntings (August 27, 2003) and was Mignola's only original Hellboy comic book work that year.

Hellboy travels to Long Island, New York in 1991, to investigate the haunted house of former Master of the Heliopic Brotherhood of Ra, Dr. Carp, who vanished in 1902. In a secret basement room, Hellboy uncovers the remains of the doctor's experiments and the source of the haunting.

=== The Ghoul ===
This story by Mike Mignola was originally published in one-shot anthology The Dark Horse Book of the Dead (June 1, 2005).

Hellboy travels to London in 1992 to hunt down the ghoulish poetry-reciting grave robber Edward Stokes who is at work in the city's Hammersmith cemetery. Concurrently, B.P.R.D. agent Pauline Raskin encounters the innocent Mrs. Stokes, who is watching a puppet theatre production of William Shakespeare's Hamlet on television.

=== The Vampire of Prague ===
This story (written by Mike Mignola and illustrated by P. Craig Russell) was created specially for the collection.

Hellboy arrives in Prague on August 19, 1982, to challenge the former verger of St. Peter's Church, a vampiric gambler who was cursed for playing cards with the dead when he ran out of living opponents. Hellboy must beat him at his own game to end the reign of terror.

=== Makoma ===
This story by Mike Mignola and Richard Corben was originally published as the two-issue mini-series Hellboy: Makoma (February–March 2006).
