= Beasts of Burden =

Comic book series

- Cover to Beasts of Burden #4 (Dec. 2009) by Jill Thompson

Publication information
- Publisher: Dark Horse Comics

Creative team
- Created by: Evan Dorkin; Jill Thompson
- Written by: Evan Dorkin
- Artist(s): Jill Thompson; Benjamin Dewey
- Letterer(s): Jill Thompson (2003–2005); Jason Arthur (2006–2016); Nate Piekos (2018–present)
- Editor(s): Scott Allie (2003–2016); Daniel Chabon (2018–present)

Collected editions
- Animal Rites: ISBN 978-1-5958-2513-1
- Neighborhood Watch: ISBN 978-1-5067-1410-3
- Wise Dogs and Eldritch Men: ISBN 978-1-5067-0874-4
- Occupied Territory: ISBN 978-1-5067-2039-5

Beasts of Burden is a comic book series created by writer Evan Dorkin and artists Jill Thompson and Benjamin Dewey, and published by American company Dark Horse Comics. The title centers on an eponymous team of intelligent animals who investigate paranormal events in their small neighborhood of Burden Hill. The initial group consists of five dogs and a cat. They are often seen consulting with "Wise Dogs", local shamanic elders of their community.

== Publishing history ==
The characters made their first appearance in a story titled "Stray" (written by Evan Dorkin with art by Jill Thompson) in The Dark Horse Book of Hauntings. They made subsequent appearances in The Dark Horse Book of Witchcraft, The Dark Horse Book of the Dead, and The Dark Horse Book of Monsters.

Dorkin stated that he came up with the concept after being asked by Dark Horse editor Scott Allie to write a story for the horror anthology The Dark Horse Book of Hauntings.

I wanted to write a haunted-house story, but not along traditional lines. After a few false starts I hit on the idea of a haunted doghouse, which became my pitch for Stray. Scott liked it and wanted me to draw it. I draw animals about as well as I breakdance, but Scott believed in me. Which was really nice. Luckily for us all, I convinced him to approach Jill Thompson instead.

— Evan Dorkin, 2010

In 2009 the characters appeared in their own four-issue miniseries. The following year the characters appeared alongside Hellboy in a one-shot crossover issue titled Hellboy/Beasts of Burden: Sacrifice. Three new Beasts of Burden short stories appeared in the fourth, sixth, and eighth issues of the relaunched Dark Horse Presents series during 2011 and 2012, all of which were later reprinted in the Beasts of Burden: Neighborhood Watch one-shot. The publishing schedule slowed down after that with only two issues from 2013 to 2017.

Basically, when Jill's available to work on the book we work on the book. I have three notebooks of material right now, the entire storyline is pretty much sketched out, with room for diversions and side-trips. If I had my way I'd be working on Beasts full-time, it's my favorite project and the one I'm always thinking about. It's a labor-intensive book and Jill's in high demand so it takes awhile for us to get these stories out there. I wish we were on a regular schedule, but unfortunately I don't see that ever happening.

— Evan Dorkin, 2014

Late 2017, Dorkin wrote on his blog that Thompson was almost finished with the first issue of a two-part story, The Presence of Others, and artist Benjamin Dewey was working on a four-issue story titled Wise Dogs and Eldritch Men. Dorkin confirmed on his Twitter account that more stories were planned for both Thompson and Dewey. In 2019, The Presence of Others was published with Jill Thompson on the first issue and Benjamin Dewey on the second, and the Occupied Territory four-issue miniseries with Benjamin Dewey was published in 2021.

== Characters ==
=== The Apprentices ===
- Ace, a Husky, courageous and bitten by a werewolf in "A Boy and His Dog"
- Jack, a Beagle, has some sensitivity to the paranormal
- Pugsley, a Pug, who is outspoken, snarky and cynical, often gets told to shut up by the others
- Rex, a Doberman, who is often afraid
- The Orphan, a male orange tabby cat who is ownerless. He is the only non-canine to attend dog funeral services. He possesses street smarts.
- Whitey, a Jack Russell Terrier who has a tendency to vomit or wet himself when frightened
- Dymphna, a former witch's familiar introduced in The Unfamiliar
- Miranda, a black dog who can cast spells

=== The Swifties ===
A gang of neighbourhood cats that work with the apprentices introduced in "Something Whiskered This Way Comes" and as allies in "The Presence of Others".

- The Get Away Kid, ownerless tuxedo cat with a reputation for escape
- Muggsy, a calico cat who is a "first lifer" (a cat that hasn't used up any of its nine lives)
- Sleeping Bob
- Johnny Whiskers

=== Wise Dogs ===
- Cian
- Emrys, an Old English Sheepdog
- Lundy, a Scottish Terrier
- Dempsey
- Brigid

=== Other characters ===
- Red, a dog
- Holstein, a cat

== Comics ==
Date	Story	Appeared in…	Writer	Artist	Letterer	Notes
August 27, 2003	Stray	The Dark Horse Book of Hauntings	Evan Dorkin	Jill Thompson	Jill Thompson	
July 7, 2004	The Unfamiliar	The Dark Horse Book of Witchcraft	Evan Dorkin	Jill Thompson	Jill Thompson	
June 1, 2005	Let Sleeping Dogs Lie	The Dark Horse Book of the Dead	Evan Dorkin	Jill Thompson	Jill Thompson	
December 13, 2006	A Dog and His Boy	The Dark Horse Book of Monsters	Evan Dorkin and Sarah Dyer	Jill Thompson	Jason Arthur	
September 16, 2009	The Gathering Storm	Beasts of Burden #1	Evan Dorkin	Jill Thompson	Jason Arthur	
October 21, 2009	Lost	Beasts of Burden #2	Evan Dorkin	Jill Thompson	Jason Arthur	
November 25, 2009	Something Whiskered This Way Comes	Beasts of Burden #3	Evan Dorkin	Jill Thompson	Jason Arthur	
December 23, 2009	Grave Happenings	Beasts of Burden #4	Evan Dorkin	Jill Thompson	Jason Arthur	
October 27, 2010	Sacrifice	Hellboy/Beasts of Burden: Sacrifice	Evan Dorkin and Mike Mignola	Jill Thompson	Jason Arthur	
September 21, 2011	Food Run	Dark Horse Presents #4	Evan Dorkin	Jill Thompson	Jason Arthur	
November 23, 2011	Story Time	Dark Horse Presents #6	Evan Dorkin	Jill Thompson	Jason Arthur	
February 1, 2012	The View from the Hill	Dark Horse Presents #8	Evan Dorkin	Jill Thompson	Jason Arthur	
August 1, 2012	RECOLLECTS: Food Run; Story Time; The View from the Hill	Beasts of Burden: Neighborhood Watch	Evan Dorkin	Jill Thompson	Jason Arthur	
March 12, 2014	Hunters and Gatherers	Beasts of Burden: Hunters and Gatherers	Evan Dorkin	Jill Thompson	Jason Arthur	
May 4, 2016	What the Cat Dragged In	Beasts of Burden: What the Cat Dragged In	Evan Dorkin and Sarah Dyer	Jill Thompson	Jason Arthur	
August 22, 2018	Wise Dogs and Eldritch Men	Beasts of Burden: Wise Dogs and Eldritch Men #1	Evan Dorkin	Benjamin Dewey	Nate Piekos	
September 26, 2018	Wise Dogs and Eldritch Men	Beasts of Burden: Wise Dogs and Eldritch Men #2	Evan Dorkin	Benjamin Dewey	Nate Piekos	
October 24, 2018	Wise Dogs and Eldritch Men	Beasts of Burden: Wise Dogs and Eldritch Men #3	Evan Dorkin	Benjamin Dewey	Nate Piekos	
December 19, 2018	Wise Dogs and Eldritch Men	Beasts of Burden: Wise Dogs and Eldritch Men #4	Evan Dorkin	Benjamin Dewey	Nate Piekos	
May 1, 2019	The Presence of Others	Beasts of Burden: The Presence of Others #1	Evan Dorkin	Jill Thompson	Nate Piekos	
June 5, 2019	The Presence of Others	Beasts of Burden: The Presence of Others #2	Evan Dorkin	Benjamin Dewey	Nate Piekos	
April 7, 2021	Occupied Territory	Beasts of Burden: Occupied Territory #1	Evan Dorkin and Sarah Dyer	Benjamin Dewey	Nate Piekos	
May 5, 2021	Occupied Territory	Beasts of Burden: Occupied Territory #2	Evan Dorkin and Sarah Dyer	Benjamin Dewey	Nate Piekos	
June 2, 2021	Occupied Territory	Beasts of Burden: Occupied Territory #3	Evan Dorkin and Sarah Dyer	Benjamin Dewey	Nate Piekos	
July 7, 2021	Occupied Territory	Beasts of Burden: Occupied Territory #4	Evan Dorkin and Sarah Dyer	Benjamin Dewey	Nate Piekos	

=== Collected editions ===
Volume	Title	Date	Stories Collected	ISBN	Notes
1	Beasts of Burden: Animal Rites	June 30, 2010 (HC) May 9, 2018 (TPB)	Stray; The Unfamiliar; Let Sleeping Dogs Lie; A Dog and His Boy; The Gathering Storm; Lost; Something Whiskered This Way Comes; Grave Happenings	9781595825131 (HC) 9781506706368 (TPB)	
	Beasts of Burden: Wise Dogs and Eldritch Men	March 20, 2019 (HC)	Wise Dogs and Eldritch Men	9781506708744 (HC)	
2	Beasts of Burden: Neighborhood Watch	September 18, 2019 (HC)	Sacrifice; Food Run; Story Time; The View from the Hill; Hunters and Gatherers; What the Cat Dragged In; The Presence of Others	9781506714103 (HC)	
	Beasts of Burden: Occupied Territory	November 30, 2021 (HC)	Occupied Territory	9781506720395 (HC)	
	Beasts of Burden Omnibus	February 18, 2025 (TPB)	Animal Rites; Occupied Territory; Neighborhood Watch; Wise Dogs and Eldrich Men	9781506746784 (TPB)	

== Film ==
A CG-animated film adaptation was announced via Reel FX Creative Studios with filmmaker Andrew Adamson scheduled to produce, and writer Darren Lemke attached to write the screenplay. On February 20, 2013, it was announced that Shane Acker would direct the film, with Mike Richardson and Aron Warner joining Adamson as producers.

In April 2021, Evan Dorkin revealed that this adaptation never moved beyond pre-production and that he was not a fan of the script that would have been used. No further adaptation plans have been announced.

== Awards and recognition ==
- 2004 Eisner Awards: Won Best Painter/Multimedia Artist (Interior Art)
- 2005 Eisner Awards: Won Best Short Story
- 2007 Eisner Awards: Won Best Painter/Multimedia Artist (Interior Art)
- 2010 Eisner Awards: Won Best Painter/Multimedia Artist (Interior Art)
- 2010 Eisner Awards: Won Best Publication for Teens
- 2010 Harvey Awards: Nominated for Best Continuing or Limited Series
- 2011 National Cartoonist Society: Won Best Comic Book Artist (Jill Thompson)
- 2011 Anthony Awards: Nominated for Best Graphic Novel
- 2011 Eisner Awards: Nominated for Best Graphic Album - Reprint
- 2011 Harvey Awards: Won for Best Graphic Album Previously Published
- 2015 Eisner Awards: Won Best Single Issue/One-Shot (for Beasts of Burden: Hunters and Gatherers)
- 2017 Eisner Awards: Won Best Painter/Multimedia Artist (Interior Art)
- 2017 Eisner Awards: Won Best Single Issue/One-Shot (for Beasts of Burden: What the Cat Dragged In)
