= Arvid Nelson =

American comic book writer

- Area: Writer
- Notable works: Rex Mundi

Arvid Nelson is an American comic book writer, best known for Rex Mundi.

== Life and career ==
Nelson started writing comics while at Dartmouth College, where he also converted to the Baháʼí Faith. After graduating in 1999 he became a production assistant on a Woody Allen film, but it was while working on a documentary about The Paris Review that he visited Paris and started picking up influences that would lead to his creating Rex Mundi. It was planned as a 38 issue series and ends with issue #19. He has also created spin-off stories, like "Hill of Martyrs" which started in Rex Mundi #14 and continued online.

Nelson has also worked at Marvel and DC. For the former he wrote a Nightcrawler story in X-Men Unlimited. At DC he wrote a Mr Terrific story in JSA Classified and the first one-shot of The Joker's Asylum series.

One major literary influence is Robert E. Howard and Nelson has worked on a Kull limited series at Dark Horse and in May 2009 it was announced that he would be writing Thulsa Doom for Dynamite Entertainment.

== Bibliography ==
- Rex Mundi (#1–18, Image Comics, 2002–06, #1–19, Dark Horse Comics, 2006–09) collected as:
  - Volume 1: The Guardian of the Temple (collects Rex Mundi (vol. 1) #0–5, Image Comics, ISBN 978-1-58240-341-0, Dark Horse Comics, ISBN 978-1-59307-652-8)
  - Volume 2: The River Underground (collects Rex Mundi (vol. 1) #6–11, Image Comics, ISBN 978-1-58240-479-0, Dark Horse Comics, ISBN 978-1-59307-682-5)
  - Volume 3: The Lost Kings (collects Rex Mundi #12–17, Dark Horse Comics, ISBN 978-1-59307-651-1)
  - Volume 4: Crown and Sword (collects Rex Mundi (vol. 1) #18, Rex Mundi (vol. 2) #1–5 and "To Weaver A Lover" in The Dark Horse Book of Monsters, Dark Horse Comics, ISBN 978-1-59307-824-9)
  - Volume 5: The Valley at the End of the World (collects Rex Mundi (vol. 2) #6–12, Dark Horse Comics, ISBN 978-1-59582-192-8)
  - Volume 6: Gate of God (collects Rex Mundi (vol. 2) #13–19, Dark Horse Comics, ISBN 978-1-59582-403-5)
- X-Men Unlimited (vol. 2) #7 (with pencils by Lewis Larosa and inks by Tom Palmer, Marvel Comics, April 2005)
- killer7 (2006)
- Zero Killer (2007)
- "Mr Horrific" (with Alex Sanchez, in JSA Classified #29–31, DC Comics, 2007)
- The Joker's Asylum: "The Joker" (with Alex Sanchez, one-shot, DC Comics, 2008)
- Kull (with Will Conrad, 5-issue limited series, Dark Horse Comics, 2008–09)
- Thulsa Doom (with artist Lui Antonio, Dynamite Entertainment, 2009)
- Red Sonja (with artist Jackson Herbert, Dynamite Entertainment, 2009–2010, forthcoming)
- Rage: After the Impact (with artists Andrea Mutti, Pierluigi Baldassini, Michael Atiyeh, Dark Horse Comics, 2011)
- Thulsa Doom (with artists Lui Antonio, Dark Horse Comics, 2011)
- Warlord of Mars (with artist Carlos Rafael, Dynamite Entertainment, 2011-2014)
- Red Bull's E-Sport Comic: The Fateful 8 Volume 2 (with artist Yvel Guichet, Dark Horse Comics, 2015)
- The Great Wall (with artist Gian Fernando, Legendary Pictures, 2017)
- Skull Island: The Birth of Kong (with artist Zid, Legendary Pictures, 2017)

== See also ==
- List of Baháʼís
- Baháʼí Faith in fiction
