= Rex Mundi (comics) =

American comic book series

- Cover to Rex Mundi #0. Art by EricJ.

Publication information
- Publisher: Image Comics (2003–2006); Dark Horse Comics (2006–2009)
- Format: Ongoing series
- Genre: Alternate history, fantasy, mystery
- Publication date: August 2003 – August 2009
- No. of issues: 38

Creative team
- Created by: Arvid Nelson, Eric J
- Written by: Arvid Nelson
- Artists: Eric J (2003–2005); Jim di Bartolo (2005–2009); Juan Ferreyra (2005–2009)
- Colorists: Jeremy Cox (2003–2005); Jim di Bartolo (2005–2009); Juan Ferreyra (2005–2009)

Collected editions
- The Guardian of the Temple: ISBN 978-1-58240-341-0 (2004); ISBN 978-1-59307-652-8 (2006)
- The River Underground: ISBN 9781582404790 (2005); ISBN 978-1-59307-682-5 (2007)
- The Lost Kings: ISBN 9781593076511 (2006)
- Crown and Sword: ISBN 9781593078249 (2007)
- The Valley at the End of the World: ISBN 9781595821928 (2008)
- Gate of God: ISBN 9781595824035 (2010)

Rex Mundi is an American comic book series published by Image Comics (2003–2006) and Dark Horse Comics (2006–2009), written by Arvid Nelson and drawn by EricJ (later issues were drawn by Argentinian artist Juan Ferreyra). In all, 19 issues were published by Image before the series moved to Dark Horse, where a further 19 were published before the title ended.

The series is a quest for the Holy Grail told as a murder mystery. It is set in the year 1933, in an alternate history Europe, where magic is real, feudalism persisted, and the Protestant Reformation was crushed by a still politically powerful Catholic Church. All of this is woven together as "... a meditation on the prophecies surrounding the advent of the Baháʼí era." The book takes its name from the Latin term meaning King of the World. It is derived from the Cathar heresies of the Middle Ages, and taken up in works like The Holy Blood and the Holy Grail. Within the Cathar context it seems to have been equated with the Demiurge.

== Publication history ==
Rex Mundi writer and co-creator Arvid Nelson came up with Rex Mundi while in Paris helping to film a documentary on The Paris Review, a literary magazine founded by Ivy League ex-pats in the 1950s

It was the first time I had been to Europe and it radically changed my view of the world", Nelson says of the period. "All the history that had seemed so dull and remote in high school became suddenly visceral and alive."

Surrounded by the juxtaposition of being in an ancient city in otherwise modern times, Nelson says he had the idea, although very vague at the time, about a story set in a place that looked modern but was actually medieval. When speaking of his plans for the story, Nelson said that it would remain primarily set in Europe, but the very end will involve a Muslim Spain.

Rex Mundi artist, Juan Ferreyra, cites photographer Eugène Atget, artist Alphonse Mucha and Coco Chanel among the many visual references for his work in Rex Mundi.

Nelson described the impact his belief in the Baháʼí Faith had on the concept:

There's also an even deeper level, allegorically, in Baháʼí faith, which in a mystical sense goes back to Abraham. ... God said to Abraham, 'I will make prophets out of your descendants. That's plural. His sons were Ishmael and Isaac, and from Isaac eventually down the years we get Jesus and the Jewish prophets. From Ishmael, eventually we get Mohammed. Baháʼí represents the reconciliation of these prophetic traditions into one unified religion. So in Rex Mundi, Julien represents Mohammed's line, Lorraine represents Christ, and Genevieve is the unity. ... [Though] it's not a direct correlation — Jesus wasn't evil.

Rex Mundi was initially published by Image Comics, starting in 2003. In August 2006 it moved to Dark Horse. This came about after Nelson and Eric J split over creative differences. Eric J described the situation in a note to members of the Rex Mundi mailing list announcing his departure from the title:

Earlier tonight Arvid informed me that we would not be continuing to work on the book together. I wish that I could say that I am surprised by this, but I'm not unfortunately. ... I know that sounds like the old 'creative differences' line that gets thrown out so much, but now I can see why it get used so often. It is very literally the only 'clean' and accurate way to express something that is not 'clean,' but rather very complex.

Subsequently, Nelson sent the Image collections to Dark Horse editor Scott Allie. Dark Horse then expressed interest in taking over the publication of Rex Mundi, and Nelson described it as "an incredible opportunity that he wanted to take full advantage of".

== Related comics ==
Rex Mundi devotes space in each issue to a fictitious newspaper, Le Journal de la Liberté, which enables Nelson to embellish events elsewhere in the setting without writing them entirely in his storylines, thus giving readers some useful, but not always essential, background.

The official website for Rex Mundi initially carried a spin-off comic series called Brother Matthew. Prior to the breakdown in the creative team of Nelson and Johnson, Nelson had commented that he was considering another comic series set in the same universe as Rex Mundi with different characters.

The Dark Horse Book of Monsters, which was the fourth book released in a series of books under The Dark Horse Book of banner, included a Rex Mundi story by Nelson and Ferreyra called 'To Weave a Lover'.

== Collected editions ==
Rex Mundi has been collected in the following trade paperbacks.

Vol	Title	Material collected	Publisher	ISBN	Published
1	The Guardian of the Temple	Rex Mundi #0–5 "Brother Mathew, Bleesed Are The Meek, Webcomic (Image Comics)	Image Comics	ISBN 978-1-58240-341-0	February 18, 2004
1	The Guardian of the Temple	Rex Mundi #0–5 "Brother Mathew, Bleesed Are The Meek, Webcomic (Image Comics)	Dark Horse Books	ISBN 978-1-59307-652-8	November 1, 2006
2	The River Underground	Rex Mundi #6–11 (Image Comics)	Image Comics	ISBN 978-1-58240-479-0	June 1, 2005
2	The River Underground	Rex Mundi #6–11 (Image Comics)	Dark Horse Books	ISBN 978-1-59307-682-5	January 31, 2007
3	The Lost Kings	Rex Mundi #12–17 (Image Comics)	Dark Horse Books	ISBN 978-1-59307-651-1	September 20, 2006
4	Crown and Sword	Rex Mundi #18 (Image Comics); Rex Mundi #1–5 (Dark Horse Comics); "To Weave a Lover", The Dark Horse Book of Monsters (Dark Horse Comics)	Dark Horse Books	ISBN 978-1-59307-824-9	December 12, 2007
5	The Valley at the End of the World	Rex Mundi #6–12 (Dark Horse Comics); "Frailty", MySpace Dark Horse Presents #7	Dark Horse Books	ISBN 978-1-59582-192-8	December 3, 2008
6	Gate of God	Rex Mundi #13–19 (Dark Horse Comics)	Dark Horse Books	ISBN 978-1-59582-403-5	February 10, 2010

== Film adaptation ==
There have been a number of rumours about a film version of Rex Mundi. In 2006, Jim Uhls was hired to write a script for Johnny Depp to star in and produce. It is not known how much further production has progressed since then. Arvid Nelson confirms the rumor of the movie, and working with Johnny Depp. In December 2008, Nelson described that "the wheels of Hollywood grind slowly. ... We are at a second revision of the screenplay, so that's good. The way this works is there are periods of feverish activity, followed by lulls ... We're in one of the lulls now." An interview with MTV's Splash Page in March 2009 confirmed the film was still progressing and searching for a director.
