= Instant Piano =

- Instant Piano #1 (August 1994)

Publication information
- Publisher: Dark Horse Comics
- Schedule: Irregular
- Format: Ongoing series
- Genre: Humor/comedy
- Publication date: August 1994 – June 1995
- No. of issues: 4

Instant Piano was a humorous comics anthology published by Dark Horse Comics. It ran for four issues from 1994 to 1995.

== Awards and recognition ==
Writer Evan Dorkin received an Eisner Award for Best Short Story in 1996 for his story "The Eltingville Comic-Book, Science-Fiction, Fantasy, Horror, and Role-Playing Club in Bring Me the Head of Boba Fett" in issue #3 of the series.
