= Eltingville, Staten Island =

Neighborhood in New York City

Eltingville
- Neighborhood of Staten Island
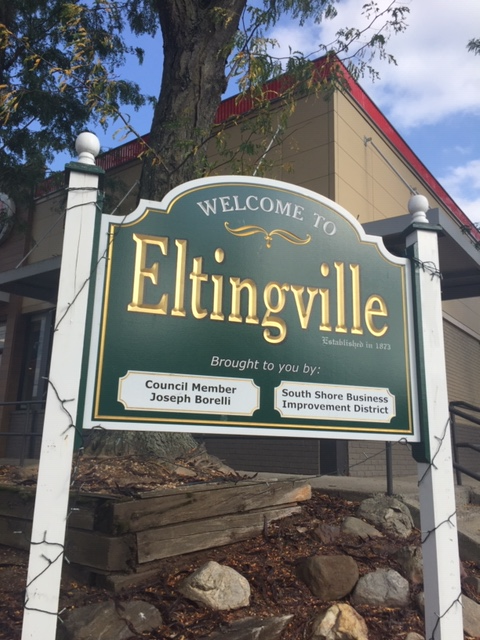
- "Welcome to Eltingville" sign, at Richmond Avenue
- Interactive map of Eltingville
- Coordinates: 40°32′22″N 74°09′23″W
- Country: United States
- State: New York
- County: Richmond
- Time zone: UTC−5 (Eastern)
- ZIP Codes: 10308, 10312
- Area codes: 917, 718, 347, 929

Eltingville is a neighborhood in the Staten Island borough of New York City, United States. It is located on Staten Island's South Shore, immediately to the south of Great Kills and north of Annadale. The main commercial area of Eltingville extends down Richmond Avenue, with offshoots heading north on Amboy Road and Hylan Boulevard. Eltingville is represented in the New York State Senate by Andrew Lanza, in the New York State Assembly by Michael Reilly, and in the New York City Council by Frank Morano.

== History ==
Originally called South Side, and later Seaside, the neighborhood owes its present name to a prominent family by the name of Elting which settled there in the early 19th century. It was the southern terminus of the Staten Island Railway until 1860, when the line was extended to Tottenville. The community's main business district sprang up around the railroad station, which is located a short distance north of the intersection of Amboy Road and Richmond Avenue.

It is probably with the neighborhoods of Eltingville and Great Kills in mind that New York Telephone named a telephone exchange "Honeywood" in the 1920s; this exchange, which also served Annadale and Huguenot, was retired from service in 1959, but a local business establishment—Honeywood Liquors on Hylan Boulevard—remained for decades as a reminder of the exchange's existence. When Honeywood 6 and nearby Tottenville 8, with operators connecting all calls, converted to dial service the combined exchanges became YUkon 4. Today, in addition to 984, the Verizon telephone exchange numbers include 356 (formerly FL6), 226, 227, 317, 948, 966, and 967. The 605 and 608 exchanges were added in 1998 and 1999, respectively.

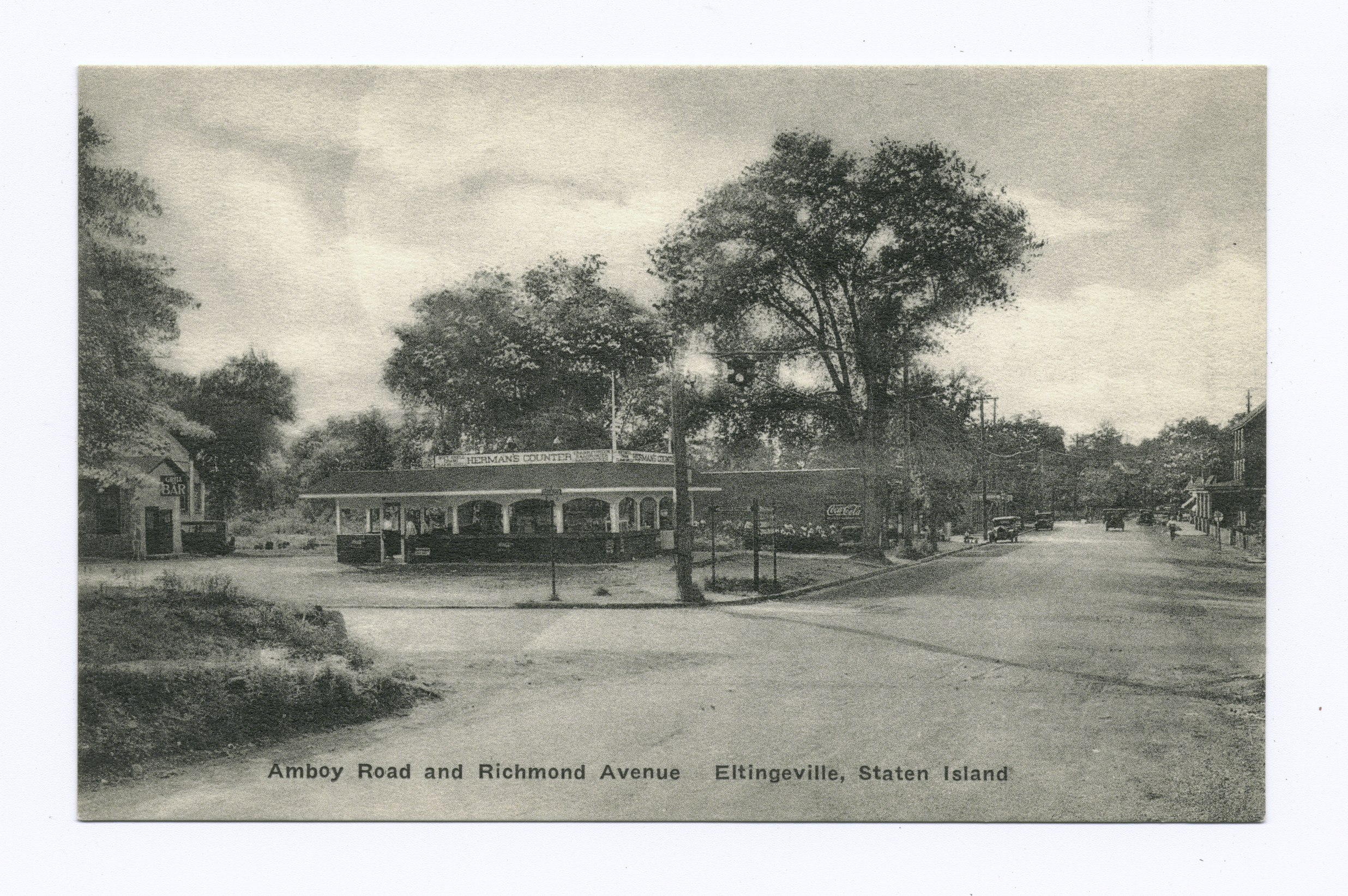
Amboy Road and Richmond Avenue, Eltingville, early 20th century

In the early 20th century, Eltingville was settled primarily by Scandinavians, mostly Norwegians, to the point that unrelated families in the neighborhood often shared identical surnames, including Hansen, Johnson, Erickson, Ronning, Nygren, Bundesen and Swanson. These names were so common that people in Eltingville would differentiate between families by appending their trade or other defining characteristics with nicknames, such as "delicatessen Hansen", "fish Hansen", "two-family" Hansen. A granddaughter of one of these Eltingville families is model Patti Hansen, wife of Rolling Stones guitarist Keith Richards.

The Scandinavian influence in Eltingville meant one could buy herring in wooden barrels which would be taken home and pickled. The Eltingville Lutheran Church was founded by Norwegians, including Henry W. Erickson, who was a charter member of the congregation and the contractor who built the church, and the church served as a thriving support base for the community. Many of the older homes built in Eltingville, and other parts of the South Shore, were built by Scandinavian carpenters, including Henry W. Erickson, and another prominent builder, Ernst Nilsson, who emigrated from Sweden at the age of 12 and became a millionaire in house construction in southern Staten Island. Many of these homes have since been demolished and continue to be torn down, and little is documented about the contributions of the Scandinavian immigrants that built them.

Optimo Cigar, a once popular cigar store chain found across New York City, originated from the store founded in Eltingville by a Norwegian man, Paul Alan Moe. For many years, Optimo Cigar was located next to the Eltingville train station. The store closed in the 1990s, although two fluted, Greek-style columns from the storefront remain as a reminder.

After the Verrazzano–Narrows Bridge opened in 1964, Eltingville was the scene of massive new home construction as part of the suburbanization of New York City. Like many other Staten Island neighborhoods, the farmland that had predominated the area was developed, and the once rural area became part of the city conurbation. This initially caused logistical problems, chiefly a lack of sewer lines, which then needed to be built. As a result, local traffic frequently had to be detoured from many main thoroughfares, including a large section of Hylan Boulevard during the 1990s.

Eltingville today has a large Italian-American population, like most of the south shore of Staten Island, with many Italian-owned businesses, including Giovanni's Ristorante, John Vincent Scalia Funeral Home, Portobello Cafe, Freddie's Pork Store and Salumeria, Sure Electrical Contracting, Carlo's Fish Market, DeRosa & Sons, Pastosa Ravioli, and a large number of pizzerias. The office of State Senator Andrew Lanza is also located on Richmond Avenue in the neighborhood. Eltingville is home to a smaller number of Irish-Americans, as well as a growing population of Russians and other minority ethnic groups.

St. Alban's Episcopal Church was listed on the National Register of Historic Places in 1982.

== Demographics ==
For census purposes, the New York City Department of City Planning classifies Eltingville as part of a larger Neighborhood Tabulation Area called Great Kills-Eltingville SI0302. This designated neighborhood had 54,699 inhabitants based on data from the 2020 United States Census. This was an increase of 1,831 persons (3.5%) from the 52,868 counted in 2010. The neighborhood had a population density of 19.7 inhabitants per acre.

The racial makeup of the neighborhood was 79.7% (43,582) White (Non-Hispanic), 0.6% (316) Black (Non-Hispanic), 7.5% (4,076) Asian, 2.1% (1,154) from some other race or from two or more races. Hispanic or Latino of any race were 10.2% (5,571) of the population.

According to the 2020 United States Census, this area has many cultural communities of over 1,000 inhabitants. These groups are residents who identify as Puerto Rican, English, Polish, Russian, Chinese, German, Irish, Egyptian, and Italian.

Most inhabitants are higher-aged adults: 29% are between 45–64 years old. 72.9% of the households had at least one family present. Out of the 19,994 households, 55.3%% had a married couple (21.0% with a child under 18), 3.9% had a cohabiting couple (1.1% with a child under 18), 14.6% had a single male (1.0% with a child under 18), and 26.2% had a single female (3.3% with a child under 18). 29.9% of households had children. In this neighborhood, 22.9% of non-vacant housing units are renter-occupied.

The entirety of Community District 3, which comprises Eltingville and other South Shore neighborhoods, had 159,132 inhabitants as of NYC Health's 2018 Community Health Profile, with an average life expectancy of 81.3 years at birth. This is about the same as the life expectancy of 81.2 for all New York City neighborhoods. Most inhabitants are youth and middle-aged adults: 21% are between the ages of 0 and 17, 26% between 25 and 44, and 29% between 45 and 64. The ratio of college-aged and elderly residents was lower, at 8% and 16% respectively.

As of 2017, the median household income in Community District 3 was $96,796. In 2018, an estimated 11% of South Shore residents lived in poverty, compared to 17% in all of Staten Island and 20% in all of New York City. On average during 2012–2016, one in sixteen South Shore residents (6%) were unemployed, compared to 6% in Staten Island and 9% in New York City. Rent burden, or the percentage of renters who paid more than 30% of their income for housing, was 42% for the South Shore, compared to the boroughwide and citywide rates of 49% and 51%, respectively. As of 2018, Eltingville and the South Shore were considered middle- to high-income relative to the rest of the city, and not gentrifying.

== Education ==
Eltingville is home to many schools, including P.S. 42 and Eltingville Lutheran School, both of which send students to I.S.7 for middle school.

== Transportation ==
Eltingville is served by the S54, S59, S78, S79 SBS and S89 local buses. It is also served by the Staten Island Railway at the Eltingville station, and the SIM1, SIM1C, SIM4, SIM4C, SIM5, SIM6, SIM7, SIM8, SIM9, SIM10, SIM15, SIM22 and SIM31 express buses, many of which terminate at the Eltingville Transit Center.

== Notable residents ==
- Evan Dorkin, comic book creator, worked at Jim Hanley's Universe, a comic book store in Eltingville, off and on for six years. His comic book series The Eltingville Club, which was adapted into an animated pilot for Adult Swim, is set in the neighborhood.
- Vito Fossella, politician, campaign headquarters was in Eltingville.
- Daisy Martinez, actress and author
- Steven Seagal, actor, once lived in Eltingville.
