= The Dark Horse Book of... =

Comics series

- The Dark Horse Book of Hauntings cover by Gary Gianni

Publication information
- Publisher: Dark Horse Comics
- Format: One-shot
- Genre: Horror
- Publication date: August 27, 2003
- No. of issues: 4 volumes
- Main character(s): Hellboy; Beasts of Burden

Creative team
- Written by: Various
- Artist: Various
- Editor: Scott Allie

Collected editions
- The Dark Horse Book of Hauntings: ISBN 9781569719589
- The Dark Horse Book of Witchcraft: ISBN 9781593071080
- The Dark Horse Book of the Dead: ISBN 9781593072810
- The Dark Horse Book of Monsters: ISBN 9781593076566
- The Dark Horse Book of Horror: ISBN 9781506703725

The Dark Horse Book of... was the banner title given to a series of four Dark Horse Comics one-shot hardcover comic book horror anthologies edited by Scott Allie and featuring the work of Mike Mignola and others. In 2017 Dark Horse collected all four volumes together in The Dark Horse Book of Horror.

== Volumes ==
=== The Dark Horse Book of Hauntings ===
This first volume was published on August 27, 2003 and featured Mike Mignola's only new Hellboy story for that year as well as a new Devil's Footprints story, a Victorian ghost story illustrated by Gary Gianni, and an interview with real-life séance medium L.L. Dreller.

In his introduction editor Scott Allie states that he has loved anthologies for as long as he can remember and that the theme for this anthology came from the Hellboy story about a haunted house contributed by Mike Mignola, although he would later expand the remit somewhat to fit the works of Randy Stradler and others.

Jill Thompson won the 2004 "Best Painter/Multimedia Artist (Interior)" Eisner Award for the story Stray in this collection.

Title	Creators
Gone	Story: Mike Richardson; Art: P. Craig Russell
Mike sends young Jake into a condemned house on a bet, and when he fails to emerge the boy's moms and the town sheriff follow in succession, leaving Mike trapped, alone and forced to follow as well.
Dr. Carp's Experiment	Story & Art: Mike Mignola
Hellboy travels to Long Island, New York in 1991 to investigate the haunted house of former Master of the Heliopic Brotherhood of Ra, Dr. Carp, who vanished in 1902. In a secret basement room, Hellboy uncovers the remains of the doctor's experiments and the source of the haunting.
Thurnley Abbey	Story: Perceval Landon; Art: Gary Gianni
Alastair Colvin relates to the narrator, whilst travelling to the Orient by train and mail boat, a terrifying spectral encounter he had at the country home of his friend John Broughton, the eponymous Thurnley Abbey, that has left him afraid to sleep alone.
This Small Favor	Story: Scott Allie; Art: Paul Lee, Brian Horton
Mr. and Mrs. Matthies call in exorcist Mr. Waite to clear their new home of its ghostly inhabitant who has caused the deaths of several previous residents, but his motives are not as clear as they at first appear to be.
Forever	Story & Art: Uli Oesterle
Anthony finds his life cursed by a magical tattoo that continues to grow to cover his entire body after he skips out of the tattoo parlour without paying his bill and runs down the tattooist, Cheng Lee, as he flees.
The House on the Corner	Story: Milton Freewater, Jr.; Art: Lucas Marangan
A skeptical young boy, who dismisses The Dark Horse Book of Hauntings because he does not believe in ghosts, is given a guided tour of the local haunted house by a mysterious stranger in white.
Spirit Rescue	Interviewer: Scott Allie
Editor Scott Allie conducts an in-depth interview with Larry L. Dreller, who is an author and practicing séance medium with the First Spiritual Science Church, in which they discuss the history, practice and beliefs of spiritualism.
Lies, Death and Olfactory Delusions	Story: Randy Stradler; Art: Paul Chadwick
After a spectral encounter with Larry, a deceased classmate known for his bad smell, a young boy growing up in 1960s America is forced to question the nature of life and death.
Stray	Story: Evan Dorkin; Art: Jill Thompson
A group of neighbourhood dogs summon the Wise Dog to help their friend Jack exorcise the spirit of a dead dog named Trixie from his haunted doghouse, but they must call in the help of the cat called the Orphan before they can finally proclaim that this doghouse is clean.

=== The Dark Horse Book of Witchcraft ===
This second volume was published July 7, 2004 and featured a new Hellboy story by Mike Mignola as well as a sequel to Stray by Evan Dorkin and Jill Thompson story, a classic witch tale by Clark Ashton Smith illustrated by cover artist Gary Gianni, and an interview with Wiccan High Priestess Phyllis Currott.

In the introduction, editor Scott Allie states that he was once again influenced by Mike Mignola in the choice of a theme for this second volume, which is inspired by the works of Nathaniel Hawthorne, Lord Dunsany and Weird Tales (for whom Smith formerly wrote).

The volume was nominated for the 2004 "Favorite One-Shot" Wizard Fan Award and Evan Dorkin and Jill Thompson won the 2005 "Best Short Story" Eisner Award for the story Unfamiliar.

Title	Creators
MacBeth	Story: William Shakespeare; Art: Tony Millionaire
Artist Tony Millionaire adapts the meeting of the three witches from Shakespeare's “Macbeth” which includes the line, “Double, double, toil and trouble, fire burn and cauldron bubble", and ends with “By the pricking of my thumbs something wicked this way comes.”
The Troll Witch	Story & Art: Mike Mignola
Hellboy travels to Norway in 1963 to seek the assistance of the legendary troll witch, who in her youth had ridden into the trolls' den on the back of a goat armed only with a wooden spoon and defeated them, but now the trolls have returned and are hunting and killing once again.
Mother of Toads	Story: Clark Ashton Smith; Art: Gary Gianni
Young apothecary assistant Pierre Baudin is sent by his master to fetch a potent philtre from the witch Mére Antoinette. But the repulsive hag uses her potions to seduce him.
The Flower Girl	Story: Scott Allie; Art: Paul Lee, Brian Horton
A girl pursues her misbehaving younger sister into a neighbour's yard where she witnesses a witch cavorting with her familiars and is struck by a curse that can only be lifted by passing it on to her sister.
The Gris-Gris	Story & Art: Jim & Ruth Keegan
Charles de Marlborough, son of a wealthy planter in Louisiana 1838, is challenged by an accomplished duellist and turns to a witch for help. But he spurns her offer of a gris-gris, which he later comes to regret.
Golden Calf Blues	Story: Mark Ricketts; Art: Sean Philips
A young boy in Leviticus, Mississippi in 1936 purchases a guitar that once belonged to the reviled Bill Penny. He finds that, while it only plays blue notes, it can still entice the people of the town to abandon the church and its reverend.
The Truth About Witchcraft	Interviewer: Scott Allie
Editor Scott Allie conducts an in-depth interview with H.P's Phyllis Currott, J.D., who is an attorney, author, and practicing Wiccan High Priestess, in which they discuss the history, practice and beliefs of Wicca.
Salem and Mary Sibley	Story & Art: Scott Morse
The infamous witch trials of Salem, Massachusetts in 1692 are sparked when the slave girl Tituba is visited by the ghost of Mary Sibley who instructs her to bake a witch cake that indicates devilry afoot in the town.
The Unfamiliar	Story: Evan Dorkin; Art: Jill Thompson
When Jack's neighbourhood becomes overrun by mysterious black cats, the familiars of newly arrived witches, the Wise Dog returns to help to disrupt their demonic plan to summon Sekhmet and save the world.

=== The Dark Horse Book of the Dead ===
This third volume was published June 1, 2005 and featured a new Hellboy story by Mike Mignola as well as a story by Goon creator Eric Powell and a classic tale by Conan the Barbarian creator Robert E. Howard illustrated by cover artist Gary Gianni.

In his introduction editor Scott Allie states that this was supposed to be the last book in the series, because he thought he was pushing his luck with three, but he changed his mind and a fourth was produced. He agreed to it because he enjoyed working with the writers and artists involved in the series.

Title	Creators
The Hungry Ghosts	Story & Art: Kelley Jones
Backwoodsman Jebediah Kyle is hunting in the woods, pursued by the revenant remains of the undead, when he stumbles across a party of illegal fur trappers working the remote areas where the authorities will not pursue them.
The Ghoul	Story & Art: Mike Mignola
Hellboy and fellow B.P.R.D. agent Pauline Raskin travel to London in 1992 to hunt down ancient poetry reciting grave robber Edward Stokes, who is at work in the city's Hammersmith Cemetery, whilst his wife sits at home watching a puppet theatre production of Shakespeare's Hamlet on TV.
Old Garfield’s Heart	Story: Robert E. Howard; Art: Gary Gianni
The narrator travels with Doc. Blaine to visit Jim Garfield, an old frontiersman who claims to be immortal after receiving a heart from Lipan medicine man Ghost Man after a battle with the Comanche in 1874.
The Ditch	Story: David Crouse; Art: Todd Heman
A truck driver reassesses his careless lifestyle and his relationship with his father after accidentally running over a dog, which falls into a roadside ditch, and driving on without stopping to see if it was either injured or dead.
Death Boy	Story: Bob Fingerman; Art: Roger Langridge
A teen Goth wakes up in hospital after an alleged suicide attempt goes wrong and finds Death has passed on his powers to him, meaning anyone he touches skin-to-skin will die.
The Wallace Expedition	Story & Art: Eric Powell
Charles Oates, a member of the 1893 Wallace expedition to cross the Arctic, records the tragic events after he encounters an unnatural tree growing in the frozen waste and the members of the expedition start to be mysteriously murdered.
The Queen of Darkness	Story & Art: Pat McEown
A young zombie slayer leaves his island retreat when he sees the signs and portents of the oncoming apocalypse, but he is too late as the zombies have already laid waste to the world and he must learn why his ancient Order failed to prevent it.
Kago No Tori	Story: Jamie S. Rich; Art: Guy Davis
With Japan in turmoil, Lord Kaneto must protect his only daughter from the machinations of a rival family who have put a price on her head and cursed her to death within twenty yards of her palace home if she should ever leave it.
The Magicians	Story: Scott Allie; Art: Paul Lee, Brian Horton
The son of a long-dead sorcerer resurrects his father to learn the truth about his past, why his father abandoned him and what happened to his mother, but most of all to make contact with the man he never really knew.
Let Sleeping Dogs Lie	Story: Evan Dorkin; Art: Jill Thompson
The neighbourhood dogs find a canine corpse on the side of the road and drag it away for burial, but the witch's cat familiar from the previous story follows them and resurrects the dead with a spell that goes horribly wrong and leaves everyone in danger.

=== The Dark Horse Book of Monsters ===
This fourth and final volume was published December 13, 2006 and featured a new Hellboy story by Mike Mignola as well as Kurt Busiek and Keith Giffen's homage to the great monster comics of Jack Kirby and a classic tale of South Seas horror by William Hope Hodgson illustrated by cover artist Gary Gianni.

The volume was nominated for the 2007 "Favourite Foreign Comic Book or Graphic Novel of the Year" Ledger Award and Jill Thompson won the 2007 "Best Painter/Multimedia Artist (Interior)" Eisner Award in part for the story A Dog and His Boy in this collection.

Title	Creators
I Witnessed the End of the World!	Story: Kurt Busiek; Art: Keith Giffen & Al Milgrom
The Hydra and the Lion	Story & Art: Mike Mignola
A Tropical Horror	Story: William Hope Hodgson; Art: Gary Gianni
To Weave a Lover	Story: Arvid Nelson; Art: Juan Ferreyra
The Horror Beneath	Story: Leah Moore & John Reppion; Art: Timothy Green II
Hidden	Story: Scott Allie; Art: Paul Lee, Brian Horton
A Dog and His Boy	Story: Evan Dorkin; Art: Jill Thompson
