= Action Girl Comics =

1994–2000 comic book anthology

- Cover of Action Girl Comics #1

Publication information
- Publisher: Slave Labor Graphics
- Schedule: irregular
- Format: Ongoing series
- Publication date: 1994 – 2000
- No. of issues: 19
- Editor: Sarah Dyer

Action Girl Comics is a comic book anthology series, edited by Sarah Dyer. It features the work of female comic book creators, and is published by Slave Labor Graphics.

The most prominent recurring character is the eponymous superheroine Action Girl, an athletic teenage girl who thinks quickly and usually resolves conflicts with little or no combat. Some of her friends are also superheroines, including Flying Girl and Ultra Girl (formerly Neutrina).

Other recurring characters include Gwen and P.J., both of whom are non-superheroic, as well as Susanoo the Brawler, a tempestuous girl related to the Japanese god. However, the majority of stories in the comic are standalone rather than episodic.
