= 27th Annie Awards =

US media awards ceremony held in 1999

27th
Annie Awards

November 6, 1999

Best Feature Film:
The Iron Giant

Best Television Program:
The Simpsons

Best Home Video Production:
The Lion King II: Simba's Pride

Best Short Subject:
Blue Bunny

The 27th Annual Annie Awards were held on November 6, 1999.

Winners are marked in bold text.

== Production nominees ==
=== Best Animated Feature ===
- A Bug's Life
- **The Iron Giant**
- The Prince of Egypt
- South Park: Bigger, Longer & Uncut
- Tarzan

=== Best Animated Home Entertainment Production ===
- The Land Before Time VI: The Secret of Saurus Rock
- **The Lion King II: Simba's Pride**
- Pocahontas II: Journey to a New World
- Scooby-Doo on Zombie Island

=== Best Animated Interactive Production ===
- **The Goddamn George Liquor Program - Spumco, Inc.**

=== Best Animated Short Subject ===
- Al Tudi Tuhak
- **Bunny**
- Living Forever
- More

=== Best Animated Television Commercial ===
- Gnome – "Hollywood Gum"
- Kraft Foods – "Tweety"
- **Levi Strauss & Co. – "Sensitive"**
- San Francisco Film Society – "Celebrate Being in the Dark"
- Old Navy – "Performance Fleece"

=== Best Animated Television Production ===
- Batman Beyond
- Futurama
- King of the Hill
- The New Batman/Superman Adventures
- **The Simpsons**

== Individual achievement ==
=== Animated Effects ===
- Peter De Mund – Tarzan – Walt Disney Pictures
- **Allen Foster – The Iron Giant – Warner Bros. Feature Animation**
- Michel Gagné – The Iron Giant – Warner Bros. Feature Animation
- Joel Krasnove – The Angry Beavers – Nickelodeon Animation Studio
- Jamie Lloyd – The Prince of Egypt – DreamWorks Pictures

=== Character Animation ===
- Ken Duncan – Tarzan – Walt Disney Pictures
- Glen Keane – Tarzan – Walt Disney Pictures
- **Steve Markowski – The Iron Giant – Warner Bros. Feature Animation**
- Jim van der Keyl – The Iron Giant – Warner Bros. Feature Animation
- Dean Wellins – The Iron Giant – Warner Bros. Feature Animation

=== Directing in an Animated Feature Production ===
- **Brad Bird – The Iron Giant – Warner Bros. Feature Animation**
- Brenda Chapman, Steve Hickner and Simon Wells – The Prince of Egypt – DreamWorks Pictures
- Eric Darnell and Tim Johnson – Antz – DreamWorks Pictures and PDI
- John Lasseter and Andrew Stanton – A Bug's Life – Walt Disney Pictures and Pixar Animation Studios
- Kevin Lima and Chris Buck – Tarzan – Walt Disney Pictures

=== Directing in an Animated Television Production ===
- **Mark Gustafson – "Bougie Nights", The PJs – Will Vinton Studios**
- John McIntyre – "Mommie Fearest", The Powerpuff Girls – Cartoon Network Studios
- Nelson Recinos – "How I Spent My Weekend", Steven Spielberg Presents Pinky, Elmyra & the Brain – Warner Bros. Television Animation
- Dave Wasson – "Max & His Special Problem", Oh Yeah! Cartoons – Nickelodeon Animation Studio

=== Music in an Animated Feature Production ===
- Phil Collins (Composer and Lyricist) – "Two Worlds" (Song), Tarzan – Walt Disney Pictures
- Harry Gregson-Williams and John Powell (Composers) – Antz – DreamWorks Pictures and PDI
- **Michael Kamen (Composer) – The Iron Giant – Warner Bros. Feature Animation**
- Tom Snow (Composer), Marty Panzer and Jack Feldman (Lyricists) – "We Are One" (Song), The Lion King II: Simba's Pride – Walt Disney Television Animation
- Scott Warrender (Composer) and Joss Whedon (Lyricist) – "My Lullaby" (Song), The Lion King II: Simba's Pride – Walt Disney Television Animation

=== Music in an Animated Television Production ===
- Walter Murphy (Composer), Seth MacFarlane and David Zuckerman (Lyricists) – Main Title, Family Guy – 20th Century Fox Television
- **Randy Rogel (Composer and Lyricist) – "That Is the Story That's Told by the Bard" (Song), Histeria! – Warner Bros. Television Animation**
- J. Eric Schmidt and Cameron Patrick (Composers) – The San Francisco Beat (Episode), The Sylvester and Tweety Mysteries – Warner Bros. Television Animation
- Stephen James Taylor (Composer) – "Pluto's Arrow Error" (Episode), Mickey Mouse Works – Walt Disney Television Animation

=== Production Design in an Animated Feature Production ===
- John Bell – Antz – DreamWorks Pictures and PDI
- **Alan Bodner – The Iron Giant – Warner Bros. Feature Animation**
- William Cone – A Bug's Life – Walt Disney Pictures and Pixar Animation Studios
- Daniel St. Pierre – Tarzan – Walt Disney Pictures
- Mark Whiting – The Iron Giant – Warner Bros. Feature Animation

=== Production Design in an Animated Television Production ===
- Paul Harrod – "Boyz 'N' The Woods", The PJs – Will Vinton Studios
- Craig Kellman – "Uh Oh Dynamo", The Powerpuff Girls – Cartoon Network Studios
- **Glen Murakami – "Legends of the Dark Knight", The New Batman/Superman Adventures – Warner Bros. Television Animation**
- Sue Rose – "Friday", 4WD (Four Women Driving) – Walt Disney Television Animation
- Jay Stephens – "Sacred Identity", JetCat – Porchlight Entertainment

=== Storyboarding in an Animated Feature Production ===
- **Mark Andrews – The Iron Giant – Warner Bros. Feature Animation**
- Lorna Cook – The Prince of Egypt – DreamWorks Pictures
- Kevin O'Brien – The Iron Giant – Warner Bros. Feature Animation
- Brian Pimental – Tarzan – Walt Disney Pictures
- Dean Wellins – The Iron Giant – Warner Bros. Feature Animation

=== Storyboarding in an Animated Television Production ===
- Alex Kirwan – "The Man with No Nose", Oh Yeah! Cartoons – Nickelodeon Animation Studio
- Bob McKnight – "William Tell Overture", Mickey Mouse Works – Walt Disney Television Animation
- Mitch Schauer – "The Day the World Got Really Screwed Up", The Angry Beavers – Nickelodeon Animation Studio
- **Adam Van Wyk – "Black Out", Batman Beyond – Warner Bros. Television Animation**
- Dave Wasson – "Max & His Special Problem", Oh Yeah! Cartoons – Nickelodeon Animation Studio

=== Voice Acting in an Animated Feature Production ===
- Mary Kay Bergman – voice of Sheila Broflovski – South Park: Bigger, Longer & Uncut – Paramount Pictures
- Minnie Driver – voice of Jane – Tarzan – Walt Disney Pictures
- Ralph Fiennes – voice of Rameses – The Prince of Egypt – DreamWorks Pictures
- **Eli Marienthal – voice of Hogarth Hughes – The Iron Giant – Warner Bros. Feature Animation**
- Suzanne Pleshette – voice of Zira – The Lion King II: Simba's Pride – Walt Disney Television Animation

=== Voice Acting in an Animated Television Production ===
- Charlie Adler – voice of Cow – Cow and Chicken – Cartoon Network Studios
- Tara Charendoff – voice of Bubbles – The Powerpuff Girls – Cartoon Network Studios
- Eddie Murphy – voice of Thurgood Stubbs – The PJs – Will Vinton Studios
- **Rob Paulsen – voice of Pinky – Steven Spielberg Presents Pinky, Elmyra & The Brain – Warner Bros. Television Animation**
- Cree Summer – voice of Elmyra – Steven Spielberg Presents Pinky, Elmyra & The Brain – Warner Bros. Television Animation

=== Writing in an Animated Feature Production ===
- Todd Alcott, Chris Weitz and Paul Weitz – Antz – DreamWorks Pictures and PDI
- **Brad Bird and Tim McCanlies – The Iron Giant – Warner Bros. Feature Animation**
- John Lasseter, Andrew Stanton, Joe Ranft, Donald McEnery and Bob Shaw – A Bug's Life – Walt Disney Pictures and Pixar Animation Studio.
- Tab Murphy, Bob Tzudiker and Noni White – Tarzan – Walt Disney Pictures
- Trey Parker, Matt Stone and Pam Brady – South Park: Bigger, Longer & Uncut – Paramount Pictures

=== Writing in an Animated Television Production ===
- Alan Burnett and Paul Dini – "Rebirth Part I", Batman Beyond – Warner Bros. Television Animation
- Jim Dauterive – "Hank's Cowboy Movie", King of the Hill – 20th Century Fox Television in association with Deedle-Dee Productions, Judgemental Films, and 3 Arts Entertainment
- Evan Dorkin and Sarah Dyer – "Lawsuit", Space Ghost Coast to Coast – Cartoon Network Productions, Inc.
- Ken Keeler – "The Series Has Landed", Futurama – The Curiosity Co. in association with 20th Century Fox Television
- **Tim Long, Larry Doyle and Matt Selman – "Simpsons Bible Stories", The Simpsons – Gracie Films in association with 20th Century Fox Television**

== Juried awards ==
=== June Foray Award ===
Significant and benevolent or charitable impact on the art and industry of animation.

- Dave Master

=== Winsor McCay Award ===
Recognition of lifetime or career contributions to the art of animation.

- Marcell Jankovics
- Ray Patterson
- Ernie Con Pederson

=== Technical Achievement in the Field of Animation ===
- Eric Daniels

=== Certificate of Merit ===
- Melanie Crandall
- Michael Mallory
