= List of Kenner Star Wars action figures =

Kenner released a collection of 96 action figures in their Star Wars range between 1977 and 1985, excluding special figures like the original blue Snaggletooth, the Rebo Band, and certain variations. After the debut of an action figure, details in the packaging, the name, and shape of the figure were subject to change. No one characteristic (name, shape or product number) completely defines a complete list, but rather all the characteristics taken together.

== List ==
There are 96 action figures listed below, though the final card-back promoted a full line of 93 action figures. This is because when Kenner produced new versions (with new, unique product numbers) of R2-D2 and C-3PO action figures, they discontinued previous versions. Two versions of R2-D2 were discontinued, as well as one version of C-3PO.

The identical name "Bespin Security Guard" is given to two action figures. The first figure (No. 39810) is white, the second figure (No. 69640) is black. On card-backs the two Bespin Security Guards are shown separately, but still labeled with the same name. C-3PO (Removable Limbs) – No. 69430 / No. 69600 – was finally confirmed to exist on a U.S. release 45-Back The Empire Strikes Back card in 2018.

Additional action figures, consisting of a taller blue Snaggletooth, and the three members of the Rebo Band (Max Rebo, Sy Snootles and Droopy McCool), were produced for inclusion in Kenner Star Wars toy sets, but were never released on blister cards. Jabba the Hutt and several other creatures were also produced for the line, but are not generally considered part of the action-figure lineup.

The years listed in the table specify the year of production rather than release.

"Wave"	Debut package card	Action figure (verbatim from debut package)	Product no. (on card)	Debut year
A	12-Back "Star Wars"	Luke Skywalker	No. 38180	1977
A	12-Back "Star Wars"	Princess Leia	No. 38190	1977
A	12-Back "Star Wars"	Artoo-Detoo (R2-D2)	No. 38200	1977
A	12-Back "Star Wars"	Chewbacca	No. 38210	1977
A	12-Back "Star Wars"	See-Threepio (C-3PO)	No. 38220	1977
A	12-Back "Star Wars"	Darth Vader	No. 38230	1977
A	12-Back "Star Wars"	Stormtrooper	No. 38240	1977
A	12-Back "Star Wars"	Ben (Obi-Wan) Kenobi	No. 38250	1977
A	12-Back "Star Wars"	Han Solo	No. 38260	1977
A	12-Back "Star Wars"	Jawa	No. 38270	1977
A	12-Back "Star Wars"	Sand People	No. 38280	1977
A	12-Back "Star Wars"	Death Squad Commander	No. 38290	1977
B	20-Back "Star Wars"	Greedo	No. 39020	1978
B	20-Back "Star Wars"	Hammerhead	No. 39030	1978
B	20-Back "Star Wars"	Snaggletooth	No. 39040	1978
B	20-Back "Star Wars"	Walrus Man	No. 39050	1978
B	20-Back "Star Wars"	Luke Skywalker: X-wing Pilot	No. 39060	1978
B	20-Back "Star Wars"	R5-D4	No. 39070	1978
B	20-Back "Star Wars"	Death Star Droid	No. 39080	1978
B	20-Back "Star Wars"	Power Droid	No. 39090	1978
C	21-Back "Star Wars"	Boba Fett	No. 39250	1979
D	31-Back "The Empire Strikes Back"	Leia Organa (Bespin Gown)	No. 39720	1980
D	31-Back "The Empire Strikes Back"	FX-7	No. 39730	1980
D	31-Back "The Empire Strikes Back"	Imperial Stormtrooper (Hoth Battle Gear)	No. 39740	1980
D	31-Back "The Empire Strikes Back"	Rebel Soldier (Hoth Battle Gear)	No. 39750	1980
D	31-Back "The Empire Strikes Back"	Bossk (Bounty Hunter)	No. 39760	1980
D	31-Back "The Empire Strikes Back"	IG-88	No. 39770	1980
D	31-Back "The Empire Strikes Back"	Luke Skywalker (Bespin Fatigues)	No. 39780	1980
D	31-Back "The Empire Strikes Back"	Han Solo (Hoth Outfit)	No. 39790	1980
D	31-Back "The Empire Strikes Back"	Lando Calrissian	No. 39800	1980
D	31-Back "The Empire Strikes Back"	Bespin Security Guard	No. 39810	1980
E	32-Back "The Empire Strikes Back"	Yoda	No. 38310	1980
F	41-Back "The Empire Strikes Back"	Ugnaught	No. 39319	1981
F	41-Back "The Empire Strikes Back"	Dengar	No. 39329	1981
F	41-Back "The Empire Strikes Back"	Han Solo (Bespin Outfit)	No. 39339	1981
F	41-Back "The Empire Strikes Back"	Lobot	No. 39349	1981
F	41-Back "The Empire Strikes Back"	Leia (Hoth Outfit)	No. 39359	1981
F	41-Back "The Empire Strikes Back"	Rebel Commander	No. 39369	1981
F	41-Back "The Empire Strikes Back"	AT-AT Driver	No. 39379	1981
F	41-Back "The Empire Strikes Back"	Imperial Commander	No. 39389	1981
F	41-Back "The Empire Strikes Back"	2-1B	No. 39399	1981
G	45-Back "The Empire Strikes Back"	Artoo-Detoo (R2-D2) (with Sensorscope)	No. 69420 / No. 69590	1982
G	45-Back "The Empire Strikes Back"	C-3PO (Removable Limbs)	No. 69430 / No. 69600	1982
G	45-Back "The Empire Strikes Back"	Luke Skywalker (Hoth Battle Gear)	No. 69610	1982
G	45-Back "The Empire Strikes Back"	AT-AT Commander	No. 69620	1982
G	45-Back "The Empire Strikes Back"	(Twin-Pod) Cloud Car Pilot	No. 69630	1982
G	45-Back "The Empire Strikes Back"	Bespin Security Guard	No. 69640	1982
H	48-Back "The Empire Strikes Back"	4-LOM	No. 70010	1982
H	47-Back "The Empire Strikes Back"	Zuckuss	No. 70020	1982
I	47-Back "The Empire Strikes Back"	Imperial Tie Fighter Pilot	No. 70030	1982
J	65-Back "Return of the Jedi"	Admiral Ackbar	No. 70310	1982
J	65-Back "Return of the Jedi"	Luke Skywalker (Jedi Knight Outfit)	No. 70650	1983
J	65-Back "Return of the Jedi"	Princess Leia Organa (Boushh Disguise)	No. 70660	1983
J	65-Back "Return of the Jedi"	Gamorrean Guard	No. 70670	1983
J	65-Back "Return of the Jedi"	Emperor's Royal Guard	No. 70680	1983
J	65-Back "Return of the Jedi"	Chief Chirpa	No. 70690	1983
J	65-Back "Return of the Jedi"	Logray (Ewok Medicine Man)	No. 70710	1983
J	65-Back "Return of the Jedi"	Klaatu	No. 70730	1983
J	65-Back "Return of the Jedi"	Rebel Commando	No. 70740	1983
J	65-Back "Return of the Jedi"	Weequay	No. 70760	1983
J	65-Back "Return of the Jedi"	Squid Head	No. 70770	1983
J	65-Back "Return of the Jedi"	General Madine	No. 70780	1983
J	65-Back "Return of the Jedi"	Bib Fortuna	No. 70790	1983
J	65-Back "Return of the Jedi"	Ree-Yees	No. 70800	1983
J	65-Back "Return of the Jedi"	Biker Scout	No. 70820 / No. 71590	1983
J	65-Back "Return of the Jedi"	Lando Calrissian (Skiff Guard Disguise)	No. 70830	1983
J	65-Back "Return of the Jedi"	Nien Nunb	No. 70840	1983
K	77-Back "Return of the Jedi"	Nikto	No. 71190	1984
K	77-Back "Return of the Jedi"	8D8	No. 71210	1984
K	77-Back "Return of the Jedi"	Princess Leia Organa (in Combat Poncho)	No. 71220	1984
K	77-Back "Return of the Jedi"	Wicket W. Warrick	No. 71230	1984
K	77-Back "Return of the Jedi"	The Emperor	No. 71240	1984
K	77-Back "Return of the Jedi"	B-Wing Pilot	No. 71280	1984
K	77-Back "Return of the Jedi"	Klaatu (in Skiff Guard Outfit)	No. 71290	1984
K	77-Back "Return of the Jedi"	Han Solo (in Trench Coat)	No. 71300	1984
K	77-Back "Return of the Jedi"	Teebo	No. 71310	1984
K	77-Back "Return of the Jedi"	Prune Face	No. 71320	1984
K	77-Back "Return of the Jedi"	AT-ST Driver	No. 71330	1984
K	77-Back "Return of the Jedi"	Rancor Keeper	No. 71350	1984
L	79-Back "Return of the Jedi"	Lumat	No. 93670	1984
L	79-Back "Return of the Jedi"	Paploo	No. 93680	1984
M	92-Back "Power of the Force"	Luke Skywalker (in Battle Poncho)	No. 93710	1985
M	92-Back "Power of the Force"	Artoo-Detoo (R2-D2) with pop-up Lightsaber	No. 93720	1985
M	92-Back "Power of the Force"	Romba	No. 93730	1985
M	92-Back "Power of the Force"	Amanaman	No. 93740	1985
M	92-Back "Power of the Force"	Barada	No. 93750	1985
M	92-Back "Power of the Force"	Imperial Gunner	No. 93760	1985
M	92-Back "Power of the Force"	Han Solo (in Carbonite Chamber)	No. 93770	1985
M	92-Back "Power of the Force"	Luke Skywalker (Imperial Stormtrooper Outfit)	No. 93780	1985
M	92-Back "Power of the Force"	Anakin Skywalker	No. 93790	1985
M	92-Back "Power of the Force"	EV-9D9	No. 93800	1985
M	92-Back "Power of the Force"	Warok	No. 93810	1985
M	92-Back "Power of the Force"	Lando Calrissian (General Pilot)	No. 93820	1985
M	92-Back "Power of the Force"	A-Wing Pilot	No. 93830	1985
M	92-Back "Power of the Force"	Imperial Dignitary	No. 93850	1985
N	92-Back "Power of the Force" (sold outside U.S.)	Yak Face	No. 93840	1985

== Bibliography ==
- Bellomo, M (2014), The Ultimate Guide to Vintage Star Wars Action Figures, 1977–1985, Krause Publications
- Kellerman, J (2003), Star Wars Vintage Action Figures: A Guide for Collectors, Frontback Books
- Sansweet, SJ (1999), Star Wars: The Action Figure Archive, Virgin Books, ISBN 0811822796
