= The Nearness of You (Shelly Berg album) =

Recording by Shelly Berg
- Released: 2009
- Recorded: May 28, June 28, 2008
- Venue: Gusman Concert Hall, Frost School of Music, University of Miami
- Genre: Jazz
- Label: Arbors
- Producer: Shelly Berg

The Nearness of You is a solo piano album by Shelly Berg. It was recorded in 2008 and released by Arbors Records.

== Recording and music ==
The album of solo piano performances by Berg was recorded at the Gusman Concert Hall, The Philip and Patricia Frost School of Music, University of Miami, on May 28 and June 28, 2008. Berg also produced the album. The instrument was a German Steinway. The material includes jazz standards and medleys from two musicals.

== Release and reception ==
Professional ratings
Review scores
Source	Rating
AllMusic	4/5 stars

The Nearness of You was released by Arbors Records in 2009. The AllMusic reviewer commented on Berg's limited exposure as a recording musician, writing that, "Only the insular, informed, elite music community is aware of the brilliance Shelly Berg possesses, and now it's time, albeit overdue, for the rest of the world to catch up."

== Track listing ==
1. "My Fair Lady Medley: Show Me/ I've Grown Accustomed to Her Face/ On the Street Where You Live"
2. "Like a Lover"
3. "Touch of Your Lips"
4. "Nearness of You"
5. "Guys and Dolls Medley: Guys and Dolls/ I've Never Been in Love Before/ If I Were a Bell"
6. "My One and Only Love"
7. "Con Alma"
8. "Dreamsville"
9. "Where or When"

== Personnel ==
- Shelly Berg – piano
