= The Nearness of You (Astro City) =

"The Nearness of You" is a 1996 comic book story about grief. Written by Kurt Busiek and pencilled by Brent Anderson, it first appeared as a promotional item for Busiek's Astro City project (with issue number "1/2"), available free upon presentation of a coupon included in Wizard #62.

== Synopsis ==
Michael Tenicek is haunted by dreams and memories of a woman he loved and knows everything about but never met and cannot identify, other than that her name was Miranda.

Driven to the brink of suicide, he is visited by the Hanged Man, a magical being who explains that a cataclysmic battle had destroyed the timeline, and that his wife Miranda was accidentally omitted from the new version of the universe: "the chronal reconstruction was not exact. Air Ace first battled the Barnstormers on a Sunday, not a Monday... and as a result, her grandparents never met". Since their bond was particularly strong, however, Michael still remembers her, but his grief would apparently cause the bond to open up the world to extradimensional threats, so the Hanged Man is dealing with the problem by relieving Michael of his grief, which has been done through his now receiving closure. The Hanged Man also offers to take Michael's memories of Miranda, but consoled by knowing he is not insane, and subsequently that there are others who have the same kind of problem as him, Michael chooses to retain them, which the Hanged Man also reveals is what the others who have this problem always choose.

== Reception ==
"The Nearness of You" was a nominee for the 1997 Eisner Award for Best Short Story.

Comic Book Resources ranked it second in a list of the top fifty single-issue comics stories of all time, and described Michael's choice to retain his memories as "a beautiful moment captured wonderfully". Den of Geek praised it as "one of the best comic book stories of all time". At Bleeding Cool, Rich Johnston called it a "must" for readers of superhero comics, and a "classic". WomenWriteAboutComics included it on their list of "top 10 tearjerker comics", and emphasized that it is a "standout" because its impact does not depend on readers being familiar with Michael beforehand.

== Creation ==
Busiek has described "The Nearness of You" as "one of those scripts that just fell out of my brain and onto the paper — I wrote the whole thing in a day, and didn't have any trouble outlining it. It just kind of manifested itself, fully-formed". He has noted that writing the story made him "choke up"; similarly, Anderson said that reading the script "brought tears to [his] eyes" before he even began drawing it.

== Sequel ==
In 2018, Busiek revisited Michael Tenicek in a three-issue arc, depicting him as the founder of a support group, which, as he learns, has resulted in the superhero community showing their gratitude by secretly covering any and all expenses.
