= Eltingville (comics) =

Series of comics by Evan Dorkin

The Eltingville Club
- Cover for the hardcover of the complete Eltingville series, showing Bill, Pete, Josh, and Jerry

Publication information
- Publisher: Dork and House of Fun; Dark Horse Comics; Slave Labor Graphics
- Genre: Humor, parody
- Publication date: 1994
- No. of issues: 2

Creative team
- Created by: Evan Dorkin

Eltingville (also referred to as The Eltingville Club) is the name given to a series of comics created by Evan Dorkin. Initially published in 1994, the series moved from Instant Piano to his comic books Dork and House of Fun, before it received a two-issue run through Dark Horse Comics in 2014. Eltingville was adapted into a pilot for Cartoon Network's Adult Swim programming block in 2002, but was not picked up for an official series. The series has won three Eisner Awards, beginning with the 1995 story Bring Me the Head of Boba Fett. Of the series' title, Dorkin chose to name the series Eltingville after Eltingville, Staten Island, where he worked off and on in a comic book store for six years.

== Synopsis ==
The Eltingville comics follow a group of four teenage boys (Bill, Pete, Josh, and Jerry) in Eltingville, Staten Island, who are interested in various elements of geek culture, with each member showing a specific interest in one area. Dorkin has described the characters as "four older teenagers who are fans, and they’re possibly some of the worst fans who have ever lived." The series places the characters in various scenarios which Dorkin utilizes to parody common stereotypes and situations which he or others have come across in comic book and geek fandom.

== Characters ==
- William "Bill" Dickey: Bill is the de facto leader of the quartet and is shown to have a heavy interest in comic books and sci-fi shows and movies. He has an extremely overbearing personality and is greatly disliked by his peers, including the other members of the Eltingville Club. In This Fan, This Monster he is hired to work at the local comic book store Joe's Fantasy World and quickly allows the power to go to his head, resulting in the store's destruction. He is of average build with light brown hair and wears glasses. In the comic series, it has been mentioned that he has a younger brother, Tommy, but in the pilot he is replaced with a younger sister, Jane. Bill has been frequently implied to be the most sadistic and sociopathic of the four, as he attempted to murder his whole club and Joe by setting fire to his store in a fit of insanity. During the final issue of the comics, Bill is shown to have unsuccessfully transitioned into adulthood as he is still living at his mother’s house, is still a virgin, has had at least one failed business, and is more unpleasant than he was before, as his bitterness towards life and women has further warped his personality.
- Joshua "Josh" Levy: Josh is an overweight Jewish teen with glasses and dark brown hair who is heavily interested in sci-fi films, books, and television shows, especially anything Star Wars-related. He is one of Bill's primary antagonists in the series and the two often get into fights, either verbal or physical, which end in either Pete, Jerry, or both of them breaking it up. Dorkin has stated that Josh is a composite of two different people that he knows. It is implied that he has an ill mother, as she takes strong medications and has a history of heart attacks. As an adult, Josh is depicted as working for a comic book news website, with the hopes that it will serve as a stepping-stone to becoming a comic book writer, despite his fiction writing getting repeatedly rejected by publishers and his former college professor.
- Peter "Pete" DiNunzio: Pete is primarily interested in horror. He is somewhat based upon a friend of Dorkin's as well as a "certain kind of Staten Island resident". Pete has black hair, is shorter than his counterparts, usually wears a backwards baseball cap, and is of otherwise average build. Pete is an Italian-American, and it has been mentioned in the comics that Pete has a younger sister and several older brothers. In the final issue, Pete is a mostly bald adult that has found employment as a member of a film crew that specializes in creating horror porn, a position that he frequently uses to exploit desperate female performers.
- Jerry Stokes Jr.: Jerry is more withdrawn and quieter than his counterparts and is interested in fantasy role-playing games and role-playing gaming in general. His meek demeanor causes his fellow club members to view him with some disgust, as evidenced in This Fan, This Monster where Pete uses gaming terms to insult him and Bill later rants that Jerry has never really made any of his "saving throws". Jerry is based upon several different people. Jerry is of average weight and height and has blond hair. He has a habit of imitating Twiki and appears to be of a pacifistic nature. Jerry's real name has been said to be Jerome, but in This Fan, This Monster, his real name is Gerald. At the end of the series, Jerry is shown to be the most successful of the former club, as he has found employment as a professional Magic: The Gathering player, grew out his hair, has a much higher sense of self-esteem, and is dating a beautiful, popular female pop and geek culture correspondent named Mandi. In the epilogue, he intended to bring his old club members back together at the comic con and mend their friendship but after Bill caused a riot and revealed he ruined his chance at love with his childhood crush and the rest are worse than they were before, he finally had enough and angrily tells them to do what they want and no longer cares what happens to them. He then leaves, finally severing ties with them for good and cutting them out of his life.
- Joe Gargagliano: Joe is an overweight, slovenly adult male and the owner of Joe's Fantasy World. He is shown to have little to no morals when it comes to selling items and frequently mistreats his customers. He also has a book containing nicknames for different customers, including the Eltingville Club. At the end of This Fan, This Monster, Joe's comic book store is destroyed in a fire.

== Awards ==
- Eisner Award for Best Short Story for Bring Me the Head of Boba Fett (1996, won)
- Eisner Award for Best Short Story for The Marathon Men (1998, won)
- Eisner Award for Best Short Story for The Intervention (2002, won)

== Publishing history ==
The first Eltingville story was an untitled strip that ran in the first issue of Instant Piano in 1994. Dorkin initially intended for the strip to be a one-shot, but chose to continue writing Eltingville-themed stories due to reader response and his own enjoyment of the comic. Following stories were published through various different publications such as Dork, House of Fun, and Dark Horse Presents. Eltingville was published in the United Kingdom in Deadline as well as in Spain, where strips ran in the Spanish language magazine El Vibora and a collection of the strips were published in 2007 as El Club Eltingville De Comics, Ciencia-Ficcion, Fantasia, Terror y Juegos de Rol.

1. Untitled first strip (Instant Piano #1, Dark Horse Comics, 1994 - Reprinted in Dork #6)
2. Bring Me The Head of Boba Fett (Instant Piano #3, Dark Horse Comics, 1995 - Reprinted in Dork #6)
3. Bread and Suck-Asses (Dork #3, SLG Publishing, 1995)
4. The Marathon Men (Dork #4, SLG Publishing, 1997)
5. Captain's Log, Stardate 5/5/98 (Dork #6, SLG Publishing, 1998)
6. Unstable Molecules (Wizard #99, 1999 - Reprinted in Dork #8, 2000)
7. The Intervention (Dork #9, SLG Publishing, 2001)
8. As Seen On TV (Dork #10, SLG Publishing, 2002)
9. They're Dead, They're All Messed Up (Dark Horse Presents Volume 2, #12, 2012 - Reprinted in House of Fun #1, Dark Horse Comics, 2013)
10. This Fan, This Monster (Dark Horse Comics, 2014 - also known as The Eltingville Club #1)
11. Lo, There Shall Be an Epilogue (Dark Horse Comics, 2015 - also known as The Eltingville Club #2)
- The Northwest Comix Collective (Dork #6, SLG Publishing, 1998 - considered to be an alternative comics version of the Eltingville Club)

=== Collections ===
- El Club Eltingville De Comics, Ciencia-Ficcion, Fantasia, Terror y Juegos de Rol (LA Cupula Ediciones, 2007)
- The Eltingville Club (Dark Horse Comics, 2016)
- Nerd Inferno: The Essential Evan Dorkin (Dark Horse Comics, 2026)

== Development ==
Dorkin came up with the idea for Eltingville after witnessing comic book publisher and author Dan Vado receive abuse while he was working with DC Comics. Vado killed off the popular character Ice while writing Justice League America, which caused various fans to send him death threats and hate mail. Dorkin published the first Eltingville strip in Instant Piano in 1994 and ended up writing follow-up stories in the Eltingville world over a period of 20 years. The Eltingville characters are an exaggerated portrayal of several people that Dorkin knows and also draws on Dorkin's own likes and experiences as a fan, retailer, and professional. They are meant to portray the fanbase that does not "change or evolve" to embrace changes in geek culture such as the "increasing acceptance and swell of fandom", as they see their fandom as making up their entire identity and being.

Dorkin has received both praise and backlash from readers over his description of comic book readers and the geek fandom. Of Eltingville's humor, he has stated that "The humor is supposed to hit close to home, Eltingville's a joke but it's supposed to be an uncomfortable one, it's not about cuddly, cute, awkward fans, it's always been about the unsocial, self-absorbed, arrogant little tyrants that make fandom a less fun place, the idiots who make death threats to creators and rape threats against women writing about sexism in the video game industry, who flip out about the casting of an actor playing a fictional character, who argue the most ridiculous points of trivia as if they honestly matter in the scheme of things, who put fantasy above reality and don't know how to behave like credible human beings and go bonkers if they're called on that behavior. Most fans aren't like that, but in all aspects of life the trolls are the loudest and the proudest and they really junk the joint up."

== Welcome to Eltingville ==
In October 2001, work completed on an animated adaptation of the Eltingville stories, entitled Welcome to Eltingville. The pilot episode aired in 2002 as part of Cartoon Network's late night programming block Adult Swim and adapted the story Bring Me the Head of Boba Fett. Critical response for the pilot episode was positive, but the pilot was not picked up for a full series. Dorkin has stated that if he could have done the pilot over again, that he would have delegated more work and that he would have chosen a different story to animate for the episode, as it would have shown a wider perspective for the series and characters.
