= Evan Dorkin =

American cartoonist (born 1965)

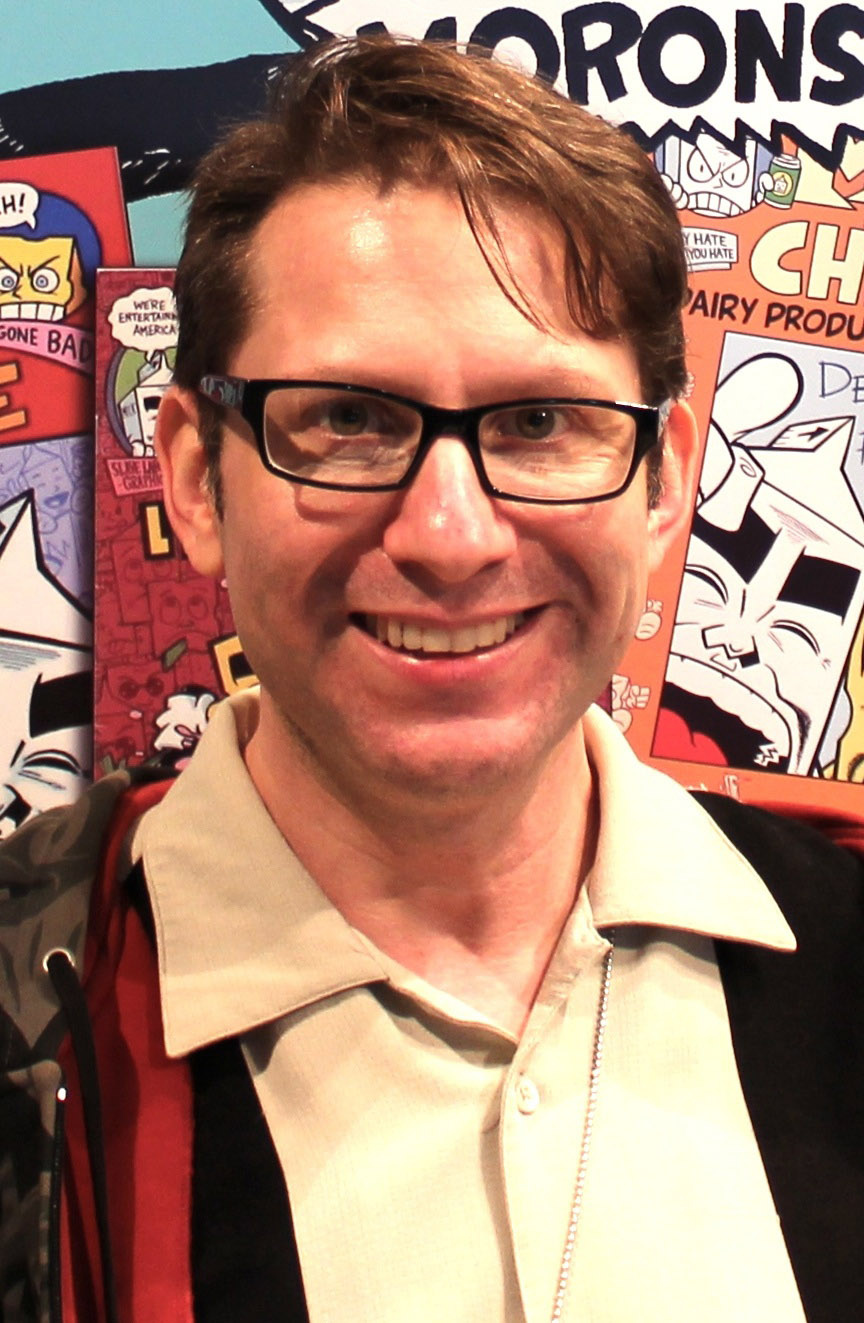
- Dorkin in 2013
- Born: April 20, 1965 (age 61) New York City, U.S.
- Areas: Writer, artist
- Notable works: Milk and Cheese; Superman and Batman: World's Funnest; Space Ghost Coast to Coast; Welcome to Eltingville; Beasts of Burden; Eltingville
- Awards: 2001 Harvey Award; Six Eisner Awards
- Spouse: Sarah Dyer

Evan Dorkin (born April 20, 1965) is an American cartoonist and comic book artist. His best known works are the comic books Milk and Cheese and Dork, the latter of which features his comic Eltingville. His comics often poke fun at fandom, even while making it clear that Dorkin is a fan himself. Dorkin also served as a writer on the Adult Swim animated series Space Ghost Coast to Coast from 1994 to 1999, and created a pilot for an Eltingville animated series for Adult Swim in 2002.

== Life and career ==
Dorkin was born in Brooklyn, New York City, and moved with his family to Staten Island when he was 13 years old. He grew up reading superhero comics (being loyal to Marvel over DC), Mad magazine, and humor titles by Archie Comics and Harvey Comics. He became even more obsessed with comics when comic book retailer Jim Hanley opened a store location near his high school; Dorkin later ended up working there.

Dorkin aspired to attend the School of Visual Arts in the animation department, but was not accepted. (He had taken some animation classes at SVA while he was in high school.) Dorkin ended up attending New York University Tisch School of the Arts, but eventually switched his passion from animation to comics.

Dorkin's earliest published solo comics were Pirate Corp$ (later renamed Hectic Planet), published first by Eternity Comics and then Slave Labor Graphics from 1987 to 1989; and then a variety of Milk & Cheese titles, published by Slave Labor Graphics from 1991 to 1997.

As well as his comics work, Dorkin and his wife, Sarah Dyer, have written for Space Ghost Coast to Coast. Dorkin drew the cover art for several ska compilation albums and an EP by Radon in the 1990s. He wrote and produced an animated television pilot for Adult Swim titled Welcome to Eltingville, based on his own characters. He and Dyer wrote some episodes of the Superman: The Animated Series including the episode "Live Wire", which introduced a new character of the same name. Dorkin wrote the Superman and Batman: World's Funnest one-shot in 2000 which was drawn by various artists. Dorkin and Dyer worked as freelance writers on the 2006 English-language version of the anime Crayon Shin-chan, where they wrote material for the show's first six episodes. Dorkin co-created Beasts of Burden with Jill Thompson. Dyer has frequently colored Dorkin's art.

== Awards ==
- 2015 Eisner Awards: Won Best Single Issue (or One-Shot) (for Beasts of Burden: Hunters and Gatherers, with Jill Thompson)
- 2010 Eisner Awards: Won Best Publication for Teens (for Beasts of Burden, with Jill Thompson)
- 2005 Eisner Awards: Won Best Short Story (for "Unfamiliar", with Jill Thompson)
- 2002 Eisner Award for Best Short Story (for "The Eltingville Club in 'The Intervention'" in Dork #9, Slave Labor Graphics)
- 2002 Eisner Award for Best Writer/Artist—Humor (for Dork)
- 2001 Harvey Award for Best Single Issue or Story (for Superman and Batman: World's Funnest, shared with various artists, DC Comics)
- 1998 Eisner Award for Best Short Story (for "The Eltingville Club in 'The Marathon Men'" in Dork #4, Slave Labor Graphics)
- 1996 Eisner Award for Best Short Story (for "The Eltingville Club in 'Bring Me the Head of Boba Fett'" in Instant Piano #3, Dark Horse Comics)
- 1995 Eisner Award for Talent Deserving of Wider Recognition

=== Nominations ===
- 2011 Anthony Awards: Nominated for Best Graphic Novel
- 2002 Eisner Award for Best Humor Publication (for Dork #9)
- 2001 Harvey Award: Special Award for Humor (for Dork, Superman and Batman: World's Funnest, etc.)
- 2000 Ignatz Award for Outstanding Debut Comic (for Dork #8)
- 1999 Annie Award for Best Writing (for Space Ghost Coast to Coast: Episode- "Lawsuit")

== Personal life ==
Dorkin is married to fellow comics writer/artist Sarah Dyer with whom he has a daughter named Emily.

== Bibliography ==
=== Comics ===
- Rom: Spaceknight — (first published art in the letters page of #37) Marvel Comics, 1982
- Jim Higgins Fantastic Fanzine — Jim Higgins, 1984
- Phigments — Amazing; Pied Piper Comics, 1987
- Pirate Corp$ / Hectic Planet – Eternity Comics / Slave Labor Graphics, 1987–1989
- The Real Ghostbusters – NOW Comics, 1988
- Wild Knights – Eternity Comics, 1989
- Milk and Cheese – Slave Labor Graphics, 1991–1997
- Predator: Big Game – Dark Horse Comics, 1991
- Bill & Ted's Bogus Journey (comic book adaptation) – Marvel Comics, 1991
- Bill & Ted's Excellent Comic Book – Marvel Comics, 1992–1993
- Predator: Bad Blood – Dark Horse Comics 1993
- Fight-Man One Shot – Marvel Comics, 1993
- Dork! – Slave Labor Graphics, 1993–present
- Instant Piano – Dark Horse Comics, 1994
- Generation ECCH! The Backlash Starts Here – Jason Cohen & Michael Krugman, Fireside Books, 1994
- Justice League America Annual #8 – DC Comics, 1994
- The Mask: The Hunt for Green October – Dark Horse Comics, 1995
- Superman Adventures #21 – DC Comics, 1998
- Superman Adventures #39 – DC Comics, 2000
- Superman and Batman: World's Funnest – DC Comics, 2000
- Bizarro Comics – DC Comics, 2001
- Captain America vol. 3 #50 – Marvel Comics, 2002
- Superman Adventures #65–66 – DC Comics, 2002
- Captain America: Red, White & Blue HC (two pages) – Marvel Comics, 2002
- The Thing: Night Falls on Yancy Street, four-issue miniseries with artist Dean Haspiel – Marvel Comics, 2003
- Bizarro World – DC Comics, 2005
- Dose – Bankshot Comics, 2007
- The Dark Horse Book of Hauntings (story "Stray") by Evan Dorkin and Jill Thompson.
- The Dark Horse Book of Witchcraft (story "The Unfamiliar") by Evan Dorkin and Jill Thompson.
- The Dark Horse Book of The Dead (story "Let Sleeping Dogs Lie") by Evan Dorkin and Jill Thompson.
- The Dark Horse Book of Monsters (story "A Dog and His Boy") by Evan Dorkin, Sarah Dyer, and Jill Thompson.
- Beasts of Burden (four-issue mini-series) by Evan Dorkin and Jill Thompson.
- Hellboy/Beasts of Burden: Sacrifice (one-shot) by Evan Dorkin, Mike Mignola, and Jill Thompson.
- Dark Horse Presents vol. 2 #4 (story "Food Run") by Evan Dorkin and Jill Thompson.
- Dark Horse Presents vol. 2 #6 (story "Story Time") by Evan Dorkin and Jill Thompson.
- Dark Horse Presents vol. 2 #8 (story "The View From The Hill") by Evan Dorkin and Jill Thompson.
- Beasts of Burden: Neighborhood Watch (three stories from Dark Horse Presents) by Evan Dorkin and Jill Thompson.
- The Eltingville Club – Dark Horse Comics, 2014
- Blackwood (four-issue mini-series) by Evan Dorkin, Veronica Fish and Andy Fish – Dark Horse Comics, 2018
- Blackwood: The Mourning After (four-issue mini-series) by Evan Dorkin, Veronica Fish and Andy Fish – Dark Horse Comics, 2020
- Nerd Inferno; The Essential Evan Dorkin (Trade Paperback) – Dark Horse Comics, 2026

=== Role-playing games ===
- GURPS Fantasy Folk
- GURPS Middle Ages I

=== Television ===
- Space Ghost Coast to Coast (TV series), 1994–1999
  - "Gum, Disease"
  - "Girlie Show"
  - "Jerk"
  - "$20.01"
  - "Sharrock"
  - "Switcheroo"
  - "Cookout"
  - "Art Show"
  - "Woody Allen's Fall Project" ("Girlie Show")
  - "Anniversary"
  - "Pilot"
  - "Zorak"
  - "Hipster"
  - "Telethon"
  - "Lawsuit"
  - "Sequel"
- Superman: The Animated Series (1997–98)
  - "Livewire"
  - "Monkey Fun"
  - "Little Girl Lost" (parts 1 & 2)
- Welcome to Eltingville (TV pilot), 2002
- Yo Gabba Gabba! (various episodes), 2007–2013
- Ben 10
  - "Xingo"
