= Sarah Dyer =

American comic book writer and artist

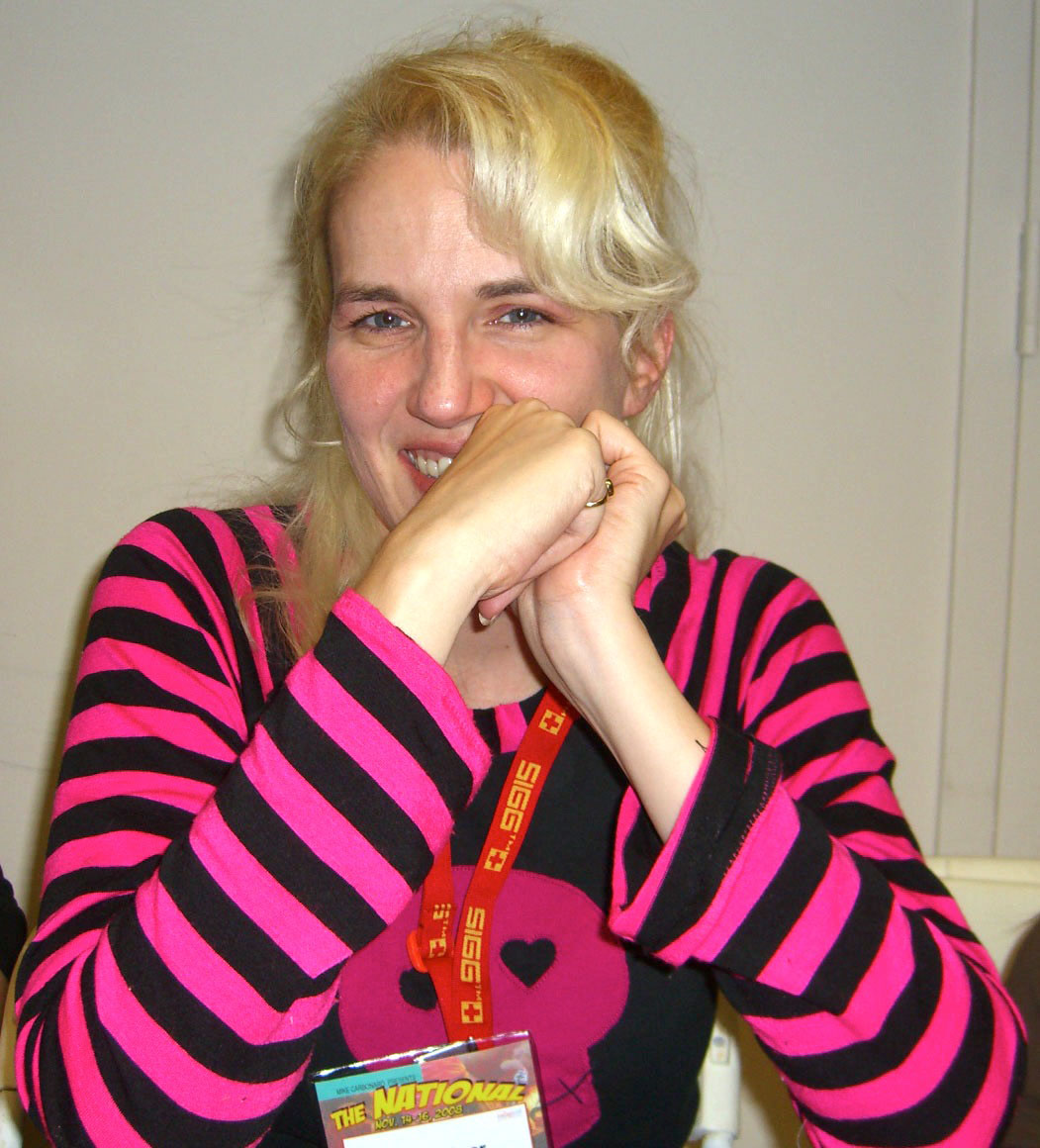
- Dyer at the Big Apple Comic Con 2008
- Born: Louisiana, U.S.
- Areas: Writer, Penciller, Inker, Colourist
- Notable works: Action Girl Comics
- Awards: Lulu Award 1998
- Spouse: Evan Dorkin

Sarah Dyer is an American comic book writer and artist with roots in the zine movement of the late 1980s and early 1990s.

In 1998, Action Girl was awarded with the "Lulu of the Year" award of Friends of Lulu.

== Early life ==
Dyer was born in Louisiana, went to college in Gainesville, Florida and then moved to New York City. She showed an early interest in self-publishing and the DIY philosophy by self-publishing her own zines and making her own clothes. At the age of 10, she published the "family newspaper" with comics in it.

== Career ==
=== Zines ===
Dyer's first work was a small publication called The Silhouette. While in school in Gainesville, Florida in 1988, she worked on the No Idea fanzine with Var Thelin. Unsatisfied with not getting credit for her work to date, Dyer created Mad Planet as her first solo work, and started collecting female zine work. This collection grew into a project in 1992, when Dyer created and began distributing the Action Girl Newsletter. This was a review zine, listing zines and mini-comics created by female writers and artists.

In an interview, Dyer described the ideal audience of works such as Xena as "post-feminist women and girls." Dyer donated these zines, accumulated from reviewing for the Action Girl Newsletter, to Duke University, where it formed the core of their Zine Collections at the Sallie Bingham Center for Women's History and Culture.

=== Comic books ===
Her first comic book credit was for coloring the cover for Pirate Corp$ #5 (December 1992). In October 1994, Dyer launched the all-female comics anthology Action Girl Comics, which ran for a total of 19 issues and showcased comics and mini-comics by female artists and writers, as well as Dyer's own Action Girl series, which featured all-female characters and depicted the world from the viewpoint of a woman. This anthology has black and white contents with colorful covers. In addition to her work with comics, Dyer has self-published manuals and articles on topics ranging from zine publishing to cooking to making clothing, all firmly rooted in DIY philosophy.

Dyer has colored Evan Dorkin's work including the cover art for several ska compilation albums in the 1990s. Dyer wrote for Space Ghost Coast to Coast, Superman Adventures, and Batman Beyond.

=== Animation ===
Dyer worked with Dorkin on the pilot episode for Welcome to Eltingville in 2002. The couple wrote some episodes of the Superman: The Animated Series, such as the episode "Live Wire", which introduced a new character of the same name. The pair contributed to the script of the 2006 English-language version of the anime Shin Chan, which ran for six episodes.

== Personal life ==
Dyer is married to fellow comics writer/artist Evan Dorkin with whom she has a daughter named Emily.

== Awards and nominations ==
Sarah Dyer was nominated for a Lulu Award in the category "Lulu of the Year" in 1997 and won in 1998 for her Action Girl series. That same year, she was nominated for Best Colorist for Amy Racecar Color Special #1 by the Will Eisner Comic Industry Awards. In 1999 she and her husband Evan Dorkin were nominated for the Annie Award for Best Writing for the Space Ghost Coast to Coast episode "Lawsuit".
