= Elias Bernstein Intermediate School =

Elias Bernstein Intermediate School 7

Location
- 1270 Huguenot Avenue Staten Island; Staten Island, New York 10312; United States; 40°31′24″N 74°11′11″W

Information
- Other name: I.S.7 and Bernstein
- Type: Public
- Established: 1965; 61 years ago
- Principal: Ms. Dina Testa
- Grades: 6–8
- Enrollment: 1,200 (approx.)
- Mascot: Viking
- Newspaper: Bernstein Bulletin
- Yearbook: Beacon
- Website: www.is7vikings.org

Elias Bernstein Intermediate School 7, also known as I.S.7 and nicknamed "Bernstein", is a middle school located in the Huguenot section of Staten Island, New York. The school serves grades 6–8, and has been operating since 1965. It was named for Elias Bernstein (1890–1950), a prominent Staten Island attorney and civic leader.

== Administration ==
Dr. Nora De Rosa, the current principal, began at I.S.7 during the 2003–2004 school year. The school has four assistant principals (A.P.'s). Three A.P.'s are assigned grades. The grade A.P. follows the grade from 6th through 8th grades. This assures continuity with students and helps foster a bond between the specific grade and the A.P. The fourth A.P. serves administrative functions for a year (e.g. testing coordinator). The school also has three grade Deans. The Deans are assigned a specific grade and do not change. This facilitates an easy transition for the students and the Assistant Principals as they move from grade to grade. Lastly, each grade has a teacher who also serves as the "Grade Leader". In addition to their teaching duties, these teachers assist the school in many activities from coordinating trips to designing and implementing contests for the students.

== Curriculum ==
I.S. 7 offers the State mandated curriculum of courses (Math, L.A., Science, Social Studies, and Foreign language) as well as opportunities for students to advance themselves in Regents courses (8th grade). Additionally, I.S. 7 offers a wide range of classes that appeal to the talents and interests of the students. These classes include, Art, Band and (and Jazz band), Dance, Drama, Performance Entertainment, Media Studies, and Technology. Each of the classes offer opportunities to showcase their work during the year. These show cases include, but are not limited to, concerts, plays, and galleries.

== Extracurricular activities ==
I.S. 7 offers a vast after school program. Students can participate in sports such as softball, football, basketball, volleyball and track. Furthermore, non-sport related activities include art, technology, music, entertainment (video editing) and drama.

== Instruction ==
The teachers and administration of the school consistently seek new and innovative ways to engage the students. For example, many teachers have implemented flexible seating in the classroom. Flexible seating utilizes furniture such as bean bag chairs, carpets, soft seating cafe like tables, and exercise balls. Furthermore, teachers utilize an array of technology in the classroom. The implementation of "Google Classroom" and "Pupil Path" are examples of such technology. Additionally, teachers challenge the students through group work, productive struggle as well as questioning techniques. The students at I.S. 7 are encouraged to persevere through problems as well as working closely with their classmates.
