= Scott Allie =

American comics writer and editor

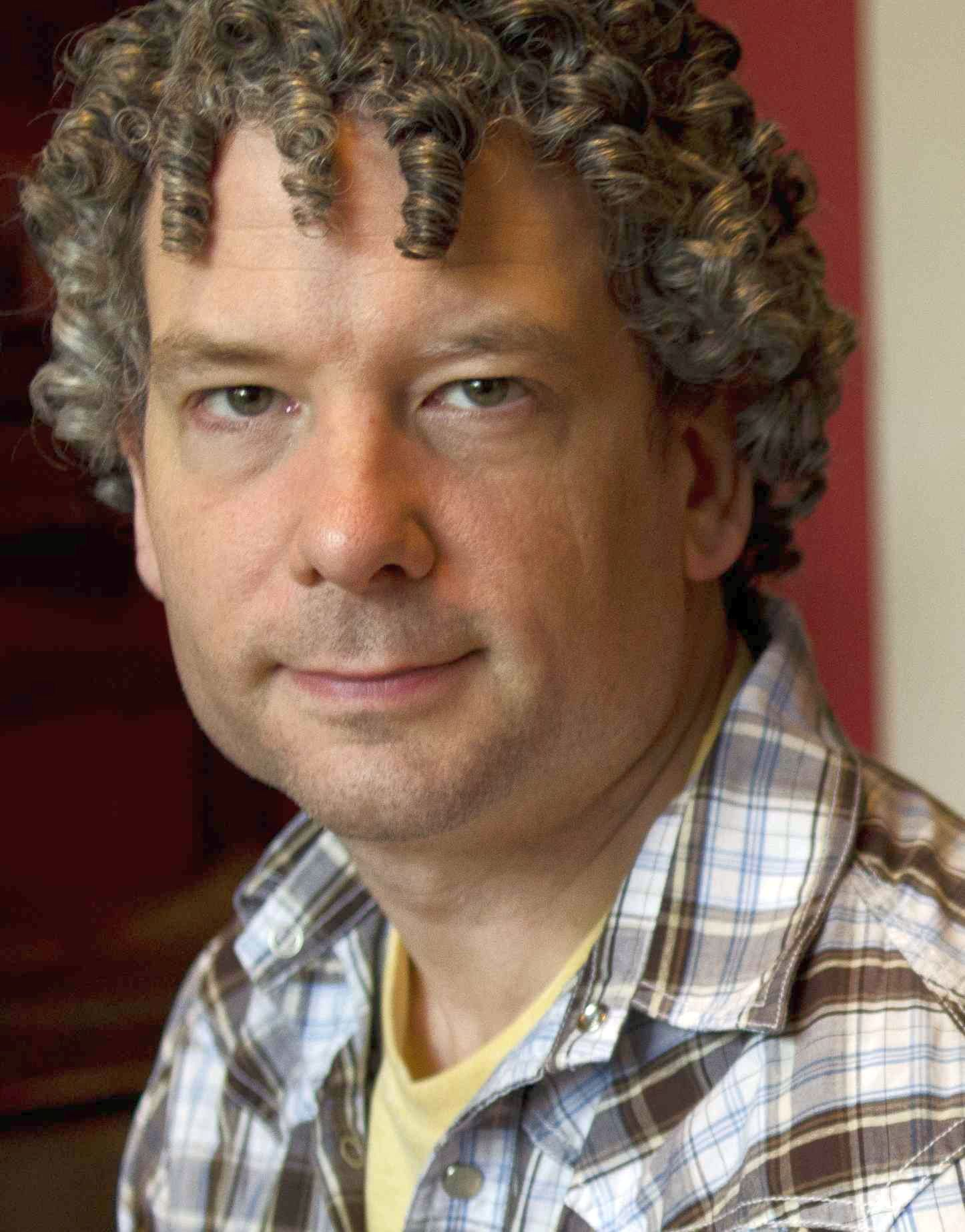
- Allie in 2012
- Areas: Writer, Editor
- Notable works: Hellboy; Conan; Buffy the Vampire Slayer; Serenity

Scott Allie is an American comics writer and editor, best known as an editor and executive at Dark Horse Comics from 1994 to 2017. During this time he edited works including Hellboy and related series (which he sometimes co-wrote with series creator Mike Mignola), and The Umbrella Academy. He continued editing for Dark Horse as a freelancer, until the company severed ties with him in 2020 amid allegations of sexual misconduct.

== Career ==
Allie joined Dark Horse Comics as an editor in September 1994. He began editing Mike Mignola's Hellboy a month after joining the publisher's Editorial department. He was promoted to editor-in-chief in October 2012, and named executive senior editor in September 2015.

As a writer, Allie wrote the four-issue miniseries The Devil's Footprints inspired by a local legend from his hometown Ipswich, Massachusetts in 2003. In 2008, he started writing the miniseries Solomon Kane, the first two-story arcs of which were expansions of the Robert E. Howard stories "The Castle of the Devil" and "Death's Black Riders." In 2012, he wrote stories for BPRD, on which he collaborated with Mike Mignola, and began writing stories for Buffy the Vampire Slayer: Season 9.

In 2013, Allie became the lead writer of the ongoing series Abe Sapien with Mike Mignola.

In September 2017, he left the company work as a freelance editor and writer. He wrote BPRD: The Devil You Know with Mike Mignola.

== Accusations of sexual assault ==
In October 2015, Allie was accused of groping and biting one individual and engaging in other questionable behavior at the 2015 San Diego Comic-Con. Allie subsequently issued a statement apologizing for unspecified behavior there and saying he was "completely embarrassed by my actions and how my behavior reflects on Dark Horse Comics." Dark Horse publisher Mike Richardson issued a statement saying he and Dark Horse took the reported incidents "very seriously" and that, "In this particular case, action was taken immediately". Allie continued as an editor for Dark Horse, becoming executive senior editor in 2015 and working as a freelancer for the company beginning in 2017.

On June 24, 2020, former Dark Horse publicist and editor Shawna Gore accused Allie of several incidents of sexual assault and harassment dating back to 1999. A few hours later, Dark Horse announced it was severing ties with Allie.

== Accolades ==
In 2012, Allie was named Editor Guest of Honor at the 2012 World Horror Convention.

== Bibliography ==
- Planet of the Apes (film adaptation) (Dark Horse Comics, 2001)
- The Devil's Footprints (Dark Horse Comics, 2003)
- The Dark Horse Book of Hauntings (Dark Horse Comics, 2003)
- Star Wars: Empire Vol. 1 (Dark Horse Comics, 2003)
- The Dark Horse Book of Witchcraft (Dark Horse Comics, 2004)
- The Dark Horse Book of The Dead (Dark Horse Comics, 2005)
- The Fog (Dark Horse Comics, 2005)
- The Dark Horse Book of Monsters (Dark Horse Comics, 2006)
- Solomon Kane (Dark Horse Comics, 2008)
- Buffy the Vampire Slayer: Season 8 #38-39 (Dark Horse Comics, 2010)
- Exurbia (Dark Horse Comics, 2009)
- B.P.R.D. (Dark Horse Comics)
  - The Dead Remembered (2011)
  - Hell on Earth: The Pickens County Horror (2012)
  - Hell on Earth: The Transformation of J. H. O'Donnell (2012)
  - Hell on Earth: The Abyss of Time (2013)
- Star Wars: Jedi: The Dark Side (Dark Horse Comics, 2011)
- Buffy the Vampire Slayer: Season 9 #9-10 (Dark Horse Comics, 2012)
- Abe Sapien (Dark Horse Comics)
  - Dark and Terrible (2013)
- BPRD (Dark Horse Comics)
  - The Devil You Know (2017)
- The Umbrella Academy (Dark Horse Comics)
  - Hotel Oblivion (2018)
