= Mike Huddleston =

American comics artist

- Areas: Penciller, Inker, Colourist
- Notable works: The Coffin, Deep Sleeper, Butcher Baker, the Righteous Maker, The Strain Trilogy

Mike Huddleston is an American comic book artist.

== Biography ==
Huddleston started working in comics in the mid-1990s at the age of 21, doing creator-owned projects for Spoon Ink and Caliber, as well as some work for DC Comics, including a short run on Deathstroke with Marv Wolfman up until the title's cancellation. He later called this initial two-year stint a "false start", which prompted him to leave mainstream comics to join Jim Mahfood's 40 Oz Comics studio. Huddleston returned in 2000 with the creator-owned The Coffin for Oni Press, written by Phil Hester. Since then, Huddleston worked for independent publishers, Marvel and DC Comics, as well as latter's Vertigo and Wildstorm imprints, including lengthy runs on Harley Quinn with A. J. Lieberman and Gen^{13} with Scott Beatty and creator-owned mini-series such as Mnemovore with Ray Fawkes and Hans Rodionoff and Deep Sleeper, again with Phil Hester.

His latest assignment was Butcher Baker, the Righteous Maker, a creator-owned project at Image with Joe Casey on writing duties. The critically acclaimed series ended with issue #8, which was published on August 15, 2012, ten months after issue #7, a delay that Casey stated was due to Huddleston's having overcommitted himself. Huddleston responded to Casey's public statement by stating that the delay was caused by his need to take other work in order to make sufficient money, as Butcher Baker was not lucrative enough for him to avoid doing so. Huddleston further explained that he apologized to Casey and to fans for the delay.

From 2011 to 2015 Huddleston worked as the artist of the comic adaptation of Guillermo del Toro's The Strain trilogy with David Lapham as the writer and del Toro as the consultant. Reportedly, del Toro liked Huddleston's approach to design so much that it influenced the way he approached the eventual TV adaptation of the book, as well as the overall development of The Strain universe.

== Bibliography ==
Interior comic work includes:

- Wireless: "Rubicon" (script and art, with Mike Hoogterp and Bryan Wade, one-shot, Spoon Ink, 1994)
- Showcase '95 (anthology, DC Comics):
  - "Legion Science Police: The Alienation of Unification" (with Beau Smith, in #6, 1995)
  - "Arion, Lord of Atlantis: Hiding Place on Rye, Hold the Mayo" (with Paul Kupperberg, in #7, 1995)
- Black Lightning vol. 2 #9: "Demolition" (with Dave deVries and Lane Shiro, DC Comics, 1995)
- Calibrations #4: "Rust: Transitions" (with Steve Miller, anthology, Caliber, 1996)
- Deathstroke #55-60 (with Marv Wolfman, DC Comics, 1996)
- The Coffin (with Phil Hester, Oni Press):
  - "Trapped (in #1-4, 2000–2001)
  - "Happy Birthday" (in Oni Press Color Special #2, anthology, 2001)
- Cable #106: "How to Find an A-Bomb" (with Darko Macan, Marvel, 2002)
- Deep Sleeper (with Phil Hester):
  - "Vacant" (in Oni Press Color Special #3, anthology, Oni Press, 2002)
  - "Journey into Nightmare" (in #1-4, Oni Press/Image, 2004)
- 9-11 Volume 1: "Untitled" (with Marti Noxon, anthology graphic novel, Dark Horse, 2002)
- Grendel: Red, White and Black #3: "The Devil's Tide" (with Matt Wagner, anthology, Maverick, 2002)
- Captain America: Red, White & Blue: "American Dream" (with Mark Waid, anthology graphic novel, Marvel, 2002)
- Harley Quinn #26-30, 33-37 (with A. J. Lieberman, DC Comics, 2003)
- Batgirl #56-57: "War Games" (with Dylan Horrocks, DC Comics, 2004)
- Four Letter Worlds: "Funk" (with Joe Casey, anthology graphic novel, Image, 2005)
- Mnemovore #1-6 (with Ray Fawkes and Hans Rodionoff, Vertigo, 2005)
- Man-Bat #1-5 (with Bruce Jones, DC Comics, 2006)
- 24Seven (anthology graphic novel, Image):
  - "The Guts" (with Phil Hester, in Volume 1, 2006)
  - "8Ball" (with Miles Gunter, in Volume 2, 2007)
- Project: Romantic: "Connecting" (with Erin Malysa, anthology graphic novel, Adhouse Books, 2007)
- Friday the 13th: Bad Land #1-2 (with Ron Marz, Wildstorm, 2008)
- Gen^{13} vol. 4 #21-25, 27-32: "Teenage Wasteland" (with Scott Beatty, Wildstorm, 2008–2009)
- Trick 'r Treat: "Chapter One" (with Marc Andreyko, anthology graphic novel, Wildstorm, 2009)
- Butcher Baker, the Righteous Maker #1-8 (with Joe Casey, Image, 2011–2012)
- The Homeland Directive (with Robert Venditti, graphic novel, Top Shelf, 2011)
- Guillermo del Toro's The Strain Trilogy (with David Lapham, Dark Horse):
  - The Strain #1-11 (2011–2013)
  - The Strain: The Fall #1-9 (2013–2014)
  - The Strain: The Night Eternal #1-12 (2014–2015)
- The Beauty #7 (with Jeremy Haun and Jason A. Hurley, Image, 2016)
- Hickman, Jonathan; Huddleston, Mike; Wooton, Rus; Head, Sasha (2022). Decorum. ISBN 978-1-5343-1823-6. OCLC 1196246510.

=== Covers only ===
- Midnight Mover #1-4 (Oni Press, 2003)
- Harley Quinn #31-32 (DC Comics, 2003)
- Zombie Tales #1 (Boom! Studios, 2005)
- When Zombies Attack!! #1-5 (Red Maverick, 2005–2011)
- Season of the Witch #4 (Image, 2006)
- Tales of the Unexpected vol. 2 #5 (DC Comics, 2007)
- Sheena, Queen of the Jungle vol. 4 #2 (Devil's Due, 2007)
- Scarface: Scarred for Life #4 (IDW Publishing, 2007)
- The Beauty #5 (Image, 2015)
- Mythic #8 (Image, 2016)
- Drifter #11 (Image, 2016)
- The Hangman #2 (Dark Circle, 2016)
- Hellboy and the B.P.R.D. (Dark Horse):
  - 1954 – Black Sun #1-2 (2016)
  - 1954 – The Unreasoning Beast #1 (2016)
  - 1954 – Ghost Moon #1-2 (2017)
- Suicide Squad Most Wanted vol. 2 #1-6 (DC Comics, 2016–2017)
- The Power of the Dark Crystal #1, 5-8 (Archaia, 2017)
- Grrl Scouts: Magic Socks #3 (Image, 2017)
- Rasputin: Voice of the Dragon #1-5 (Dark Horse, 2017–2018)
- Kong on the Planet of the Apes #1-6 (Boom! Studios, 2017–2018)
- The Realm #4 (Image, 2017)
- Middlewest #1-6 (Image, 2018–2019)
- Albert Einstein: Time Mason #4 (Danger Zone, 2019)
- House of X #1-6 + Powers of X #1-6 (Marvel, 2019)
