= List of The Strain episodes =

Overview and brief description of each episode in "The Strain"

The Strain is an American horror drama television series that premiered on FX on July 13, 2014. It was created by Guillermo del Toro and Chuck Hogan, based on their novel trilogy of the same name. Carlton Cuse served as executive producer and showrunner. During the course of the series, 46 episodes of The Strain aired over four seasons, between July 13, 2014, and September 17, 2017.

== Series overview ==
Season	Episodes	Originally released	
Season	Episodes	First released	Last released
1	13	July 13, 2014	October 5, 2014
2	13	July 12, 2015	October 4, 2015
3	10	August 28, 2016	October 30, 2016
4	10	July 16, 2017	September 17, 2017

== Episodes ==
=== Season 1 (2014) ===
No. overall	No. in season	Title	Directed by	Teleplay by	Original release date	Prod. code	U.S. viewers (millions)
1	1	"Night Zero"	Guillermo del Toro	Guillermo del Toro & Chuck Hogan	July 13, 2014	XSN01001	2.99
When JFK ground control loses all contact with an inbound jet after it lands, the CDC Canary team, headed by Dr. Ephraim "Eph" Goodweather, is called to investigate. Goodweather and Dr. Nora Martinez discover all the plane passengers are seemingly dead. They also discover strange parasitic worms aboard the plane and fear an Ebola-like plague could break out. Four people are unexpectedly found alive, including the pilot, Doyle Redfern, though none know what happened. At JFK, Goodweather is approached by Abraham Setrakian, an elderly Harlem pawnbroker. He insists the victims' bodies must be destroyed and the elaborately carved, coffin-like cabinet that was removed from the plane's hold not leave the airport. Meanwhile, recently paroled Gus Elizalde is hired by Mr. Eichhorst, a mysterious man connected to Eldritch Palmer, a wealthy and powerful entrepreneur. Gus is to retrieve the cabinet from the airport. Eph and Nora discover the cabinet is missing, unaware that Jim Kent, their CDC co-worker, has improperly allowed its release. An airport official is killed by an enormous human-like creature that uses a throat appendage to suck out blood before smashing his head.
2	2	"The Box"	David Semel	David Weddle & Bradley Thompson	July 20, 2014	XSN01002	2.12
Gus delivers the cabinet to its destination, but is frightened off by strange noises inside it. The four survivors continue exhibiting symptoms, though the CDC releases them despite Ephraim's protests and insistence that they are suffering from a viral infection and not carbon monoxide poisoning, which is the "official" public explanation for the disaster. Ephraim's CDC boss, Dr. Everett Barnes, removes him from the case, but Eph continues working to expose the worm-driven virus, focusing his attention on the large box he believes is the source of the contagion. Eichhorst visits his old enemy, Abraham Setrakian, who was jailed after being arrested at the airport. Setrakian vows to halt the Master's plan to create a vampire army, though his weak heart has hampered his efforts. Attorney and airplane survivor Joan Luss files a lawsuit against the airline while another survivor, rock star Gabriel Bolivar, bites a girl's neck, craving blood. Captain Redfern, who has been hospitalized, quickly deteriorates as his body begins transforming. Eph is surprised and confused when Mr. Arnot calls him saying his daughter, Emma, one of the victims, has returned home safely. Eichhorst grants Palmer's request to meet the Master. Eph discovers that Dr. Bennett, the medical examiner autopsying the victims, is missing, along with the victims' bodies. At the Arnot home, Emma attacks her father with a throat appendage.
3	3	"Gone Smooth"	David Semel	Chuck Hogan	July 27, 2014	XSN01003	2.30
Eichhorst's true appearance is revealed when he is shown applying nose, ear, and throat prostheses as well as disguising his eyes and teeth, preparing himself to look more human. The four survivors continue to worsen. Captain Redfern is quarantined, but Eph and Nora are unable to treat him, and his condition deteriorates. The CDC worker Jim Kent meets with Eichhorst, refusing to take any more bribes. Eichhorst states Jim's terminally ill wife will be admitted into an experimental cancer treatment trial in exchange for his continued cooperation. Right after Setrakian is released from jail, Nora seeks him out for information. He insists the victims' bodies must be destroyed. Elsewhere, Bolivar remains holed up in his penthouse, showing increasingly erratic behavior and strange physical transformations, including his atrophied genitals falling off. After turning completely, Redfern escapes quarantine and flees to the hospital basement and feeds on stored blood. As Eph, Nora, and Jim approach, Redfern attacks. After a struggle, Eph bludgeons him to death with a fire extinguisher.
4	4	"It's Not for Everyone"	Keith Gordon	Regina Corrado	August 3, 2014	XSN01004	2.27
Eph and Nora, assisted by Jim, perform an autopsy on Redfern's transformed body and are completely baffled by his transformation. Jim confesses to Eph and Nora that he allowed the large box to leave the airport and has been accepting small bribes to help pay for his wife's medical bills. Eph, furious, strikes him. Elsewhere, Eldritch Palmer hires computer hacker Dutch Velders to disrupt the city's entire Internet and telecommunications systems. Meanwhile, Ansel Barbour, another survivor, tries to mask his worsening symptoms from his worried wife, Anne Marie. He insists she take their children to his sister's when he starts lusting for blood. Returning home, she finds the family dog dead and Ansel has chained himself inside the garden shed. He wants to attack her, but, still cognizant, restrains himself and pleads that she leave and never come back. She manages to push her angry neighbor into the shed for Ansel to feed on. Eph and Nora visit the Arnot household to verify Mr. Arnot's claim that Emma returned home. They find Emma and her father fully infected. Setrakian arrives and decapitates father and daughter. He urges Eph and Nora to join his quest. Nora is repulsed by Setrakian's cold-blooded killing of the infected, but Eph is more open to joining him. They plan to video record an infected human (or strigoi, as Setrakian calls them) which Eph can show his superior, Dr. Everett Barnes, at the CDC.
5	5	"Runaways"	Peter Weller	Gennifer Hutchison	August 10, 2014	XSN01005	2.03
After Gabriel Bolivar slaughters the urologist sent to treat him, his agent hires a "cleaner" to remove the body; Bolivar also kills the cleaner. Joan Luss, another survivor, turns more slowly. When her housekeeper Neeva sees Joan's inner horizontal eyelids, she flees with the Luss children. At the house of Ansel Barbour, Eph and Setrakian find Ann Marie, who has hanged herself, unable to face life without Ansel. The fully turned Ansel and the neighbor are in the garden shed, and Eph video records Setrakian killing them. Eph takes the recording to Everett Barnes at the CDC, but quickly realizes he has been set up to be arrested for murdering Captain Redfern. He escapes with Jim Kent's help. Flashbacks reveal a young Abraham Setrakian arriving at a concentration camp commanded by a still-human Eichhorst. Setrakian's brother says they are carpenters, so they are ordered to do woodworking for the Third Reich. At night, Setrakian witnesses a strange creature feeding on sleeping prisoners and plots to kill it with a stolen silver knife. One night, Abraham's brother becomes a victim. In the present, Nora visits her dementia-impaired mother at the nursing facility. When a strigoi attacks the residents, Nora and her mother flee to Nora's apartment. Vasiliy Fet, a city exterminator, notices city rats behaving strangely and tracks them to the sewers where he encounters subterranean strigoi, barely escaping alive.
6	6	"Occultation"	Peter Weller	Justin Britt-Gibson	August 17, 2014	XSN01006	2.28
The FBI arrest Eph at his estranged wife Kelly's house, after her new boyfriend Matt contacts them. Before being taken away, Eph urges Kelly to take their son Zach and leave the city, telling her it is unsafe. Eichhorst forces Gus and Jim Kent to remove Redfern's body from the hospital morgue and dump it. Knowing that recently turned strigoi return to their loved ones, Setrakian visits a plane victim's home intending to execute any infected he finds there but, physically weakened and outnumbered, he is nearly killed. To evade the FBI, Nora and her mother leave the apartment. With coming nightfall, the streets are unsafe, and Nora seeks refuge at Setrakian's pawnshop. Fet returns to his office and discovers his co-workers have been turned; he kills them, discovering that sunlight destroys strigoi. He tries persuading his estranged father to flee the strigoi threat, with no success. An eclipse provides an opportunity for the strigoi to feed and infect more victims during daytime. In the ensuring mayhem, Eph escapes while being transported by two FBI agents. Gus and his occasional partner in crime Felix are attacked on the street by Dr. Bennett, now a strigoi, and Felix is infected. Gus kills the strigoi, but he and Felix are arrested. Eph goes to Setrakian's pawnshop where he is reunited with Nora.
7	7	"For Services Rendered"	Charlotte Sieling	David Weddle & Bradley Thompson	August 24, 2014	XSN01007	2.43
Joan Luss' husband, Roger, arrives home from a business trip unaware of the horrors awaiting him. He escapes strigoi on the street, only to be ambushed and fed upon by his newly turned wife inside their house. In flashbacks back to the concentration camp, Eichhorst observes Setrakian's woodcarving skills and orders him to build a giant box and carve an intricate design on it. Back to the present, Eph and Nora, hiding out at Setrakian's pawnshop, gather weapons and supplies. At their colleague Jim Kent's apartment, they find him attempting to explain to his cancer-stricken wife that his actions (accepting bribes from Eldritch Palmer) were only intended to help her. She is unforgiving and leaves for the airport to take part in an experimental cancer treatment in another state. Jim is steadfast in his desire to make amends for his past misdeeds and vows to help Eph and Nora. They formulate a plan to use Jim as bait to lure Eichhorst into leading them to the Master, but the plan fails, and Eichhorst escapes. Elsewhere, Neeva, frightened by Joan's strange behavior, has kept the Luss children at her home, only to be countermanded by her own daughter, who insists on returning the children to their parents. At the Luss' house, Joan and a deliveryman strigoi attempt to attack the group who barricade themselves in a wine cellar. A rebel band of strigoi led by Vaun arrive, and kill Joan and the deliveryman vampire. They also kill Neeva's daughter, who was infected, but release the others unharmed.
8	8	"Creatures of the Night"	Guy Ferland	Chuck Hogan	August 31, 2014	XSN01008	1.91
Following their unsuccessful encounter with Eichhorst at Grand Central Terminus, Eph, Nora, Jim, and Setrakian regroup while awaiting the Master's retaliation for attacking Eichhorst. Making their way to Brooklyn, they break into a medical supply store to procure ultraviolet lamps to combat the strigoi where they encounter Fet, who had the same idea. The group stocks up at a nearby convenience store but when strigoi attack, they barricade themselves inside the store. The other customers, including computer hacker Dutch Velders, are shocked by the horrific events unfolding. Setrakian explains that the Master is controlling the strigoi to specifically hunt them. During a skirmish outside, Jim is infected. Eph and Nora remove a worm from his face, only to realize it has spread throughout his body. Jim begs to be killed before turning. Setrakian concurs and Fet fatally shoots Jim. As the strigoi are about to overrun the convenience store, the group escapes in a delivery truck parked outside.
9	9	"The Disappeared"	Charlotte Sieling	Regina Corrado	September 7, 2014	XSN01009	1.87
Eph and the others go to the Goodweather house in Queens, arriving just in time to save Zach from an infected Matt. Setrakian, Dutch, Fet, and Zach return to the pawnshop while Eph and Nora stay behind to burn Matt's body and wait for Kelly, who is missing. Dutch's apartment building has been infected, and Fet convinces her to come with them. At the pawnshop, Fet agrees to join Setrakian's mission, and Dutch admits to being responsible for crashing the communication networks for Eldritch Palmer. Elsewhere, Felix has fully turned into a strigoi and, while en route to Rikers Island, attacks the occupants inside the police van, crashing it. Gus kills Felix before escaping. Kelly's friend Diane arrives at the Goodweather house, just after Eph and Nora have been intimate. After a short argument, Eph tells her to contact him if she hears from Kelly, then he and Nora return to the pawnshop. In a WWII flashback, Setrakian, armed with the knife he hid, tries to kill the Master while it feeds on the prisoners. He underestimates the creature's stealth and strength, and it crushes his fingers with its enormous hands. The following day, Eichhorst, after seeing Setrakian's injuries, sends him to the group about to be executed. The prisoners escape, thanks to a surprise Allied attack on the camp. Later, Eichhorst, fleeing the Allies, arrives at a secret bunker in the woods that houses the Master's coffin. There the Master transfuses a worm into his body, triggering Eichhorst's rebirth as a strigoi.
10	10	"Loved Ones"	John Dahl	Gennifer Hutchison	September 14, 2014	XSN01010	2.22
At the pawnshop, Zach tracks Kelly's phone on a laptop, but Eph discovers that a homeless woman found the phone next to Kelly's abandoned car. A bloody tissue is inside. In flashbacks, Kelly is attacked at home by a newly turned Matt. She escapes but has been infected. Over the next 24 hours she gradually turns, and, thirsting for blood, arrives at Diane's house where she attacks Diane and her son. When Eph searches for Kelly there, he is forced to kill the infected. Finding Kelly's necklace in Diane's hand, Eph breaks down, realizing Kelly likely attacked and turned them. Dutch tells Setrakian it may be possible to undo the damage she caused to the city's communication networks but to do so she needs to infiltrate Eldritch Palmer's Stoneheart Group headquarters. She and Fet enter under the guise of city exterminators, but security spots Dutch. Palmer's personal assistant Fitzwilliam and his team intercept them. Dutch is taken to Palmer, who reveals his plans for immortality, then orders Fitzwilliam to kill them. Fitzwilliam instead releases them, admitting that he now doubts his boss' actions. Fet entreats him to join their cause, but Fitzwilliam, still loyal to Palmer, declines. Eph returns to the pawnshop and insults Dutch, who angrily leaves, preferring to take her chances on the street. Meanwhile, a fully turned Kelly is summoned by the Master, who meets her face-to-face and tells her to "rejoice."
11	11	"The Third Rail"	Deran Sarafian	Justin Britt-Gibson and Chuck Hogan	September 21, 2014	XSN01011	2.28
The group plans to infiltrate the Master's underground lair that Setrakian believes is near the 9/11 attack sites. Eph wants Nora to stay behind with Zach and her mother, who suffers from dementia. Nora refuses, and Eph instead tells Zach to look after Mrs. Martinez, leaving him the keys. Eph, Nora, Fet and Setrakian enter a deserted railway tunnel to search for the Master. Meanwhile, Zach, yielding to Mrs. Martinez's incessant demands for cigarettes, leaves the pawnshop to get her some. He finds a deserted grocery store, but when looters arrive, he hides in a back room and encounters a strigoi. Zach narrowly escapes as Gus enters, armed with an ax. After escaping the police, Gus had returned home and discovered his infected family. He killed his brother and also the turned landlord, but left his mother alive, unable to harm her. Gus sends Zach safely on his way, then destroys the strigoi and its victims. Meanwhile, Eph and the others locate the Master's lair only to find it littered with resting strigoi. Eph hears Kelly's voice crying out for help, but Setrakian knows it is a trap leading them to the Master. Eph nevertheless follows the voice into a large chamber containing the Master's coffin, only to be surrounded by strigoi. After arriving and finally meeting Eph face-to-face, the Master attempts to kill him, but Fet, Setrakian and Nora arrive and set off a home-made UV light bomb, killing some strigoi and repelling the Master. Setrakian wants to pursue his old nemesis, but is forced to retreat when the group come upon hundreds of newly turned strigoi inside a cavern.
12	12	"Last Rites"	Peter Weller	Carlton Cuse and David Weddle & Bradley Thompson	September 28, 2014	XSN01012	1.97
Setrakian, Eph, Fet, and Nora return to the pawnshop. Zach, reunited with his father, claims nothing happened while they were away. Dutch Velders returns with computer equipment and a plan to use the Emergency Alert System to transmit Eph's warning about the strigoi invasion. Elsewhere, Gus locates Alonso Creem, a former acquaintance he forces at gunpoint to provide him weapons, ammunition, and cash. Gus discovers Creem has unwittingly been transporting cargo containers containing strigoi. After opening a container, Gus battles the strigoi inside (and also Creem). Vaun, a strigoi, and his strigoi-killing team arrive and destroy the remaining vampires. Vaun and his team kidnap Gus, leaving Creem behind unharmed. Meanwhile, Dutch and Eph partially broadcast Eph's announcement before TV stations block the signal. Gabriel Bolivar breaks into the pawnshop and attacks Mrs. Martinez, infecting her, while Eichhorst and his strigoi army storm the shop, forcing Setrakian and the others to escape through a secret passage. Before exiting, Nora decapitates her mother to prevent her turning, while Setrakian abandons his deceased wife Miriam's still-beating strigoi heart. Flashbacks to 1967 reveal how Eichhorst exploits Setrakian's obsession with killing the Master to lure him into a trap, leaving Miriam unprotected; when Setrakian arrives home, he finds her infected, decapitates her, and removes her worm-infested heart as a keepsake. In the present day, Eichhorst taunts Setrakian as he and the others are escaping. Later, the Master rejuvenates a dying Eldritch Palmer by dripping bodily fluid from his finger down Palmer's throat.
13	13	"The Master"	Phil Abraham	Carlton Cuse & Chuck Hogan	October 5, 2014	XSN01013	2.09
Having escaped the pawn shop, Eph, Setrakian and Fet regroup. They deduce that the Master needs his damaged coffin repaired and is nesting nearby. Eph and Fet set out on a recon mission leading them to Gabriel Bolivar's renovated theater. Using his exterminator skills and historical knowledge of the area, Fet infiltrates the theater through an underground passage connected by the rain sewers to a nearby building. Inside they discover the Master's coffin and surmise he is close by. Before retreating, Fet removes a street manhole cover, flooding the sewer with sunlight to block any strigoi passing through. Meanwhile, Palmer is angry that the Master only restored his health rather than bestowing immortality. Eichhorst assures Palmer he will be rewarded once he completes the Master's work. Fitzwilliam, convinced Palmer has gone too far, leaves his boss' employ. Later, Palmer and Eichhorst confront Secretary of Health and Human Services Margaret Pierson and CDC Director Everett Barnes, who plan to quarantine the entire city. Palmer tosses Pierson over a balcony, making it look like suicide, then he and Eichhorst coerce Barnes into joining them. Elsewhere, Eph, Fet, Setrakian, Nora, and Dutch Velders prepare to attack the theater. Nora suggests bringing Zach when Eph is reluctant to leave him behind, unprotected from Kelly. In the tunnels beneath the theater, Fet dynamites a mob of strigoi. The group enters the theater and fights more strigoi, including Bolivar and Eichhorst. Upstairs, Setrakian and Eph confront the Master and drive him into daylight where he is severely burned, but escapes. Eichhorst, wounded, also escapes, along with Bolivar and other strigoi. Setrakian and the others are stunned that sunlight failed to kill the Master. As they retreat, Zach feigns an asthma attack to trick them into stopping at Kelly's house for his medication. Zach instead retrieves a family photo album. Kelly, now a fully turned strigoi, appears, calling Zach. Eph restrains him while shooting at Kelly, wounding her before she escapes. Setrakian warns Eph that the Master will use Kelly to track the group. Meanwhile, Vaun tells Gus that the Master is one of an ancient group of strigoi who has broken a truce amongst them. Needing a human to help slay the Master, the Ancients recruit Gus, who wants to avenge his family.

=== Season 2 (2015) ===
No. overall	No. in season	Title	Directed by	Teleplay by	Original release date	Prod. code	U.S. viewers (millions)
14	1	"BK, NY"	Gregory Hoblit; Guillermo del Toro (prologue)	Carlton Cuse & Chuck Hogan	July 12, 2015	XSN02001	1.66
In 1932, a young Abraham Setrakian's grandmother tells him the legend of Jusef Sardu, a kind-hearted nobleman afflicted with gigantism. Believing that the blood of a great wolf will cure him, Sardu's brother and cousins take him on a hunting trip. Seeing a strange creature in the woods, they leave Sardu to investigate. When they fail to return, he follows the party to a nearby cave and finds them slaughtered, with the creature feeding on his brother's blood. Sardu attempts to kill the vampire, but it overpowers him and possesses his body by infesting it with parasitic worms, as the creature's former body dies. Sardu returns to the town and begins feeding on the local children. In present day New York, Setrakian goes to Bolivar's theater to learn where the Master went. He follows a trail of vampire blood and encounters Vaun and his strigoi team. They abduct Setrakian and take him to meet the Ancients. The Ancients, Vaun, and Setrakian strike a deal that once Setrakian finds the Master that he will report his location to them. Setrakian, who keeps his deal with the Ancients a secret, later asks Eph, Nora, and Fet to help him retrieve some items from a storage warehouse. While searching the facility, the group discovers a married couple hiding out in a locker. After finding Setrakian's items, they are ambushed by strigoi. They fight their way out, but the couple is infected. Fet wants to euthanize them before they turn, but Eph wants to use their infected bodies to devise a biological weapon against the strigoi. Meanwhile, the Master, whose body is dying after exposure to sunlight, orders Eichhorst to retrieve blind children who are converted into a new type of strigoi called Feelers, imbued with psychic abilities and used as trackers. By the Master and Eichhorst's command, the Feelers are given to Kelly, whose memory has been restored. She is tasked with finding her son, Zach, and with leading the Master to Setrakian.
15	2	"By Any Means"	TJ Scott	Bradley Thompson & David Weddle	July 19, 2015	XSN02002	1.63
Eichhorst and Bolivar prepare for the Master's transfer to a new body. Eph and Nora coerce the infected couple into acting as test subjects for their experiment. The vampire biology initially appears to be invulnerable, but they eventually isolate a microbe that destroys vampire brain tissue, and they start testing the subjects. Dutch and Fet begin clearing their neighborhood of strigoi and end up becoming intimate. Justine Feraldo, city councilwoman for Staten Island, meets with Mayor Lyle and other officials about the vampire crisis. Disgusted with their ineffectual response, she vows to take matters into her own hands. A frustrated Setrakian pours over his old notes and books for clues to defeat his ancient nemesis. He discovers a copy of a page from the Occido Lumen, a legendary tome which may reveal how to kill the Master. He confronts Eldritch Palmer, who is speaking at the opening of his new food distribution center. Setrakian confirms that Palmer does not have the Lumen and makes his escape with Fet's help, vowing to find the Lumen. In flashbacks to 1965 Vienna, Setrakian meets Palmer for the first time. At Palmer's suggestion, Setrakian finds Sardu's sword in an antique shop owned by Draverhaven, a former Nazi doctor. Setrakian chases Draverhaven, losing him but obtaining the cane. Later, a panicked Draverhaven meets an old acquaintance from his Nazi days: Eichhorst, who offers him the opportunity to enter the Master's service and turns him. Palmer persuades Setrakian to help him search for the Lumen in exchange for an endowed professorship. Kelly fetches Zach's clothing from her Queens home so her "Feelers" can learn his scent. She orders them to find her son.
16	3	"Fort Defiance"	Guy Ferland	Regina Corrado	July 26, 2015	XSN02003	1.47
The team stops Zach as he attempts to return home to search for his mother. To convince him that Kelly is beyond saving, Eph shows Zach the strigoi test subject at the lab. Following Palmer's confrontation with Setrakian, the Master assigns Bolivar as extra security for Palmer, who grudgingly accepts. Palmer's new assistant, Coco Marchand, tells Palmer that she distrusts Eichhorst and Bolivar. Elsewhere, Palmer's former assistant, Reggie Fitzwilliam, travels to Staten Island and reunites with his brother, Curtis. Councilwoman Feraldo declares Staten Island a vampire-free zone, exhibiting decapitated strigoi to the media to demonstrate her effective tactics. Mayor Lyle wants her to institute the same measures throughout New York City. Setrakian, meanwhile, prepares a concoction using strigoi worms and puts the drops into his eyes. Nora finds him unconscious and revives him; he confesses that his advanced age (94) makes it necessary to use the worm brew to sustain his health and extend his life. Dutch spots a missing person poster for her former roommate, Nikki. She and Fet visit Nikki's mother, hoping for news, but the mother angrily accuses Dutch of ruining her daughter's life. Gus and Vaun lead a strigoi assault team to kidnap Palmer; however, Palmer activates an anti-strigoi UV device in his office, forcing Gus to flee while Vaun and his strigoi team are burned alive. Eph and Nora perfect their anti-strigoi bio-weapon. The neuro-toxin kills one subject too quickly however, making it ineffective for infecting other strigoi; a weaker dose appears promising, and they decide to field-test it by releasing the surviving test subject. Eph angrily vows to the Master, who is watching through the test subject, that he will kill both Zach and himself before allowing the Master to turn them.
17	4	"The Silver Angel"	J. Miles Dale; Guillermo del Toro (Luchador film)	Chuck Hogan	August 2, 2015	XSN02004	1.38
A short, black and white film introduces the Silver Angel, a famous luchador who once starred in a series of low-budget Mexican adventure movies until a crippling injury ended his career. In a flashback to 1966, Setrakian informs Palmer that he has traced the Occido Lumen to an Austrian nunnery. They arrive and discover the occupants are now vampires; a lone survivor, a young boy named Rudyard, tells them that the Mother Superior destroyed the Occido Lumen, believing it was evil. While Setrakian briefly leaves to battle strigoi, Eichhorst arrives and introduces himself to Palmer. It is implied that Eichhorst offers Palmer immortality, as Palmer immediately dissolves his and Setrakian's alliance when he returns. In the present day, Palmer convenes a meeting of the world's top financial leaders under the ruse of restoring financial stability to New York City; he has actually set them up to be slaughtered by strigoi under Bolivar's command, resulting in global financial markets going into free fall. Having escaped the Stoneheart building, Gus returns to his apartment where the Master taunts him by possessing his strigoi mother. Shaken, he goes to a restaurant for solace, but has a confrontation with the dishwasher after flirting with the owners' daughter, Aanya; Gus later recognizes the man as the former Silver Angel, who he idolized as a child. Setrakian and Dutch travel to Staten Island seeking Fitzwilliam's help in fighting Palmer, but he declines. Eph and Nora field-test their bio-weapon and get confirmation that it works when the Master forces infected strigoi to commit suicide to prevent them spreading the disease. Working alone, Fet blows up the Red Hook subway tunnel to block vampires from entering through it; he is captured by one of Feraldo's vigilante goon squads and viciously beaten. Kelly and her Feelers close in on Zach.
18	5	"Quick and Painless"	J. Miles Dale	Liz Phang	August 9, 2015	XSN02005	1.26
NYC increases its efforts to battle the strigoi as frantic citizens attempt to evacuate the city. Meanwhile, Kelly and her Feelers continue searching for Zach. Leaving Zach in Nora's care, Eph, disguised and using a false I.D., travels to Washington, D.C. to inform a government-connected colleague about the anti-strigoi bioweapon that he and Nora developed, hoping to begin mass-producing it. Nora and Dutch meet with Councilwoman Feraldo to negotiate Fet's release from custody in exchange for Nora teaching Feraldo's medical personnel how to quickly diagnose the strigoi infection. She euthanizes Feraldo's infected nephew when Feraldo is unable to do it. Setrakian visits Alonso Creem, wanting to hire him to search for the Occido Lumen. Fet and Dutch accompany Feraldo's police squad to clear a strigoi-infested building, teaching them their vampire-hunting techniques and killing a Feeler. Fitzwilliam finds Setrakian and says he is ready to help fight Palmer. While on the train to Washington, Eph encounters his former boss, Everett Barnes, who intends to have Eph arrested. During the ensuing altercation, Eph throws Barnes off the moving train and ultimately arrives in Washington without being caught. Cardinal McNamara interrupts Palmer and Marchand's romantic dinner to inform Palmer that a "certain item" Palmer is looking for may reappear soon. An unknown strigoi arrives on a private jet that has breached New Jersey's restricted airspace. Before authorities can detain him, he leaves the airport and is picked up by a car.
19	6	"Identity"	Howard Deutch	Justin Britt-Gibson	August 16, 2015	XSN02006	1.44
In Washington, D.C., Eph learns that the Federal government is slowly disintegrating, as Congress prepares to impeach the president for failing to halt the strigoi outbreak. Eph's old friend, Rob Bradley, introduces Eph to a National Guard contact who promises to help. Bradley also arranges for Eph to meet Leigh Thomas, a representative for Kemerall, a pharmaceutical company. Leigh convinces Kemerall to consider mass-producing Eph and Nora's anti-strigoi bioweapon; later, Leigh and Eph celebrate, then spend the night together. Fitzwilliam shares what he knows about Palmer's plans with Setrakian and Fet. The unnamed strigoi who arrived in New Jersey meets with the Ancients and criticizes them for failing to destroy the Master long ago; he agrees to help stop the Master, but for personal reasons. Gus and Angel escort Aanya on a food delivery run, during which they are attacked by strigoi. Gus kills the strigoi with Angel's help. Nora and Zach are ambushed by Kelly and her Feelers. Taking refuge in a church, the duo evade them until Setrakian, Fet, and Fitzwilliam arrive. The group drives off Kelly and kills the Feelers but not before one stings Fitzwilliam. Setrakian kills him to prevent his turning. After Leigh learns that Kemerall is reviewing the bioweapon on a fast-track basis, she and Eph go to Rob's house to tell him, but discover his body, the victim of a Stoneheart assassin sent to eliminate Eph. The assassin kills Leigh and wounds Eph, but Eph fatally shoots him and flees. Eichhorst is shocked and dismayed when the Master transfers his essence into Bolivar's body rather than his. The Master then demands that Eichhorst swear fealty to him in his new form.
20	7	"The Born"	Howard Deutch	Chuck Hogan	August 23, 2015	XSN02007	0.95
Fet and Dutch return to Dutch's apartment where they discover Nikki, Dutch's former roommate, hiding. Dutch brings her back to their hideout, fueling Fet's jealousy and anger over Dutch and Nikki's ambiguous relationship. Based on Fitzwilliam's information, Fet and Setrakian investigate an abandoned factory owned by Palmer and discover the Feelers' nursery. When Feelers attack, the mysterious strigoi arrives and slaughters them. He introduces himself to Fet and Setrakian as Quinlan, and says he is hunting the Master. Flashbacks reveal Quinlan's history as a millennia-old human-vampire hybrid who was a feared and vicious gladiator in Roman times. In the present day, Setrakian and Quinlan confront the Master, who is nesting in the factory, and also Eichhorst. When Fet dynamites the building, the Master escapes in the explosion. Quinlan angrily blames Setrakian and Fet for thwarting his opportunity to destroy the Master, then warns them to abandon the hunt to him. Coco Marchand entices Palmer into bed. Drinking heavily, a wounded and dejected Eph returns from Washington, learning that Zach barely escaped Kelly's clutches. Eph tells Nora that Eldritch Palmer is behind the Master's plan, and later vows to Fet that he plans to kill Palmer.
21	8	"Intruders"	Kevin Dowling	David Weddle & Bradley Thompson	August 30, 2015	XSN02008	1.36
Eichhorst teaches Kelly how to disguise herself as a human using cosmetics, prosthetics, and a wig. Eph and Zach visit Jimmy Wu, a black market dealer that Fet knows, to buy a sniper rifle with which to assassinate Palmer. Wu has been shot, and Eph performs emergency surgery to save Wu's life. In return, Wu's daughter gives Eph a rifle. Eph tells Nora about what happened while he was in Washington, D.C. Dutch helps Nikki, who was uncomfortable with the living arrangements, find a safe place to stay. Elsewhere, Cardinal McNamara engages Palmer and Setrakian in a bidding war for the Occido Lumen. Realizing this, Setrakian decides to steal the Lumen before Palmer can buy it, but Eichhorst reaches McNamara first. When McNamara refuses to reveal who is the tome's owner, Eichhorst infects him, taunting him that once fully turned, the Master can read his mind to locate the Lumen. Setrakian and Fet arrive and drive off Eichhorst. McNamara tells Setrakian that Rudyard Fonescu, the sole survivor of the 1966 massacre in the Austrian nunnery, is the Lumen's owner. Setrakian kills McNamara to prevent his turning. Meanwhile, Marchand and Palmer argue over his secretiveness regarding Eichhorst. Gus and Angel, on a supply run for the Guptas' restaurant, find the warehouse destroyed. They persuade the Guptas to abandon their restaurant and leave the city. While kissing Aanya, Gus is interrupted by Quinlan. He tells Gus he must leave Aanya for her own safety, and recruits him to help hunt the Master. The now human-looking Kelly and several Feelers breach Red Hook's quarantine and track Zach to Fet's hideout. Kelly convinces Zach to let her enter, but Eph and Nora kill the Feelers and fight Kelly off; in the process, Kelly's mask is damaged, revealing her strigoi appearance underneath to Zach.
22	9	"The Battle for Red Hook"	Kevin Dowling	Regina Corrado	September 6, 2015	XSN02009	1.15
After Kelly's incursion, Setrakian suspects another strigoi attack is imminent; he and Eph are rebuffed when they attempt to warn Councilwoman Feraldo and her team. Fet and Nora stop by Nikki's new place and suggest that Dutch and Nikki join Setrakian's group for protection, but they decline. Eichhorst and Kelly lead a small party of strigoi across the river from Manhattan and enter a power station, shutting down the power grids. Without UV lamps protecting Red Hook's border, a massive strigoi army invades. Mayor Lyle flees, leaving Feraldo in charge. She initially panics at the hopeless situation, but quickly collects herself and rallies the Red Hook citizens, calling on them to fight in the street to defend their homes. Dutch and Nikki have a vicious argument about their contentious relationship, which culminates in a passionate encounter. Later, Dutch joins the street battle and is nearly stung when Nikki arrives and kills the attacking vampire. Fet and Nora restore all the electrical power, causing the UV lamps to annihilate the strigoi army. Kelly makes another attempt to kidnap Zach, but Fet fends her off. Meanwhile, Eichhorst goes to Fet's hideout to settle his and Setrakian's old feud. Setrakian, waiting, is attacked, but Eph intervenes and Eichhorst pursues him instead. He traps Eph on a rooftop, about to turn him, when Setrakian outflanks his old foe, driving him off with silver bullets. The next morning, Feraldo makes a triumphant victory speech to Red Hook citizens, declaring the battle a turning point in the war against the strigoi plague.
23	10	"The Assassin"	Phil Abraham	Liz Phang	September 13, 2015	XSN02010	1.30
Eph and Dutch spy on Palmer to determine an ideal time and place to assassinate him. Searching for Rudyard Fonescu, who possesses the Occido Lumen, Setrakian, Fet, and Nora work to track down every "R. Fonescu" in New York City. Palmer, hoping to reconcile with Marchand, convinces her to return to his employ. Councilwoman Feraldo demands that the Upper East Side's wealthy residents pay a parcel tax in exchange for her protection, angering Mayor Lyle and his rich supporters. Eph and Dutch, learning that Palmer is appearing at a press conference, seize the opportunity to shoot him, but Eph botches his shot and hits Marchand instead, critically wounding her. He and Dutch are arrested, but Dutch is inexplicably taken away from police custody. Palmer threatens Eichhorst, demanding that the Master heal Marchand or else he will dissolve their partnership. He later confronts Eph face-to-face at the jail to show that he is still alive. The Master revives Marchand, and Palmer confesses his involvement with the Master to her. A strigoi mob attacks the police station, slaughtering most of the officers; Fet and Nora arrive in time to rescue Eph. The cop whose partner took Dutch away tells them she is at the Mayfield Hotel. Setrakian tracks down the last R. Fonescu on the list and finds the Lumen hidden in the man's room, but an unknown assailant knocks him out and takes the book. Finally, Dutch finds herself chained inside Eichhorst's dungeon.
24	11	"Dead End"	Phil Abraham	Carlton Cuse & Regina Corrado	September 20, 2015	XSN02011	1.42
Eichhorst tortures Dutch, forcing her to eat pineapple to season her blood before feeding on her. Flashbacks depict Eichhorst's history as an unsuccessful door-to-door radio salesman in 1930s Germany. While on a dinner date with Helga, a pretty coworker, he is captivated by a Nazi recruiting speech. Afterwards, he rails against the Jews to Helga, who reveals she is Jewish and rejects him. Four years later, Eichhorst has risen to the rank of Obersturmführer in the SS, attaining the status and power he had craved. He is summoned by his superiors to explain his past relationship with Helga, who has been arrested and claims to know him. He lies and says she was merely a former office co-worker who was suspected of stealing money. Shortly after, Eichhorst comes upon her and several other Jews' bodies hung in a public area. He feigns indifference as his superior watches him, but after turning and walking away, he is visibly shaken. In the present day, Dutch fends off Eichhorst's attack using mace, frees herself, and attempts to escape down a dead-end stairwell but is quickly subdued. Eph, Nora, and Fet break into Eichhorst's secret lair at the Mayfield Hotel, and, hearing Dutch's screams, blast their way through a brick wall and rescue her as Eichhorst escapes. Meanwhile Gus and Aanya become intimate. After Gus and Angel help the Guptas pass a security checkpoint and leave New York City, they join Quinlan's associate, Eve. Setrakian regains consciousness and finds himself bound to a chair by Rudyard Fonescu. He pleads with Fonescu to release him and give or sell him the Occido Lumen to save humanity; Fonescu abandons him to meet with Alonso Creem, intending to sell him the Lumen.
25	12	"Fallen Light"	Vincenzo Natali	Bradley Thompson & David Weddle	September 27, 2015	XSN02012	1.23
Flashbacks depict Eph and Nora's first meeting at a medical conference and the beginning of their romantic relationship. In the present day, Zach's grandparents have been located in Georgia and Eph and Nora make plans to take him there. Eph confesses he still loves Nora, but she is unresponsive and walks away. Dutch ends her relationship with Fet, choosing to reconcile with Nikki; however, Nikki is leaving the city, saying that Dutch has found her true passion in fighting the strigoi and she cannot take part in that. Gus and Angel break Gus's former fellow-inmates out of Rikers Island prison and recruit them as soldiers for Quinlan. Setrakian meets with Alonso Creem, who schedules a final auction for the Occido Lumen between Setrakian and Palmer. Quinlan tells Setrakian the Ancients will agree to financially back him to obtain the book. In return, Setrakian must hand over the Lumen to the Ancients after he examines it. Eichhorst demands that Palmer give him unlimited financial control at the auction. When Palmer balks, Eichhorst reveals that Palmer will soon die without another dose of the Master's rejuvenating white essence, and Palmer grudgingly accedes. A furious Mayor Lyle threatens to indict Feraldo for extorting money from the Upper East Side's wealthy residents; however, he is killed under suspicious circumstances, making Feraldo a potential suspect. In the aftermath, Palmer offers Feraldo his political support, and the New York city council appoints her as the city's new special director of security. Feraldo vows to combat the strigoi menace by any means necessary, and agrees to help Eph and Nora mass-produce their anti-strigoi bioweapon. Quinlan orders Gus to kill Setrakian and take the Lumen if Setrakian refuses to surrender it to the Ancients.
26	13	"Night Train"	Vincenzo Natali	Carlton Cuse & Chuck Hogan	October 4, 2015	XSN02013	1.17
Eichhorst inspects the "animal processing" facility being built and is pleased with its progress. At the auction, Setrakian and Eichhorst bid against each other for the Occido Lumen. Initially Eichhorst wins, but Palmer double-crosses Eichhorst by freezing his gold funds at the last minute, allowing Setrakian to obtain the book. While returning in the van with the Lumen, Setrakian and Fet are ambushed by Eichhorst and his vampire army. Quinlan and Gus arrive with their own army and battle the vampires, forcing Eichhorst to flee. Setrakian and Fet get away through a pre-planned escape route by way of the rain sewer but are intercepted by Gus, Quinlan, and Angel at the other end. Setrakian convinces Quinlan that the Lumen can be used as bait to lure and kill the Master. In retaliation for Palmer's betrayal, the Master kills Coco Marchand as Palmer helplessly watches. As Setrakian did with his wife, Palmer removes Marchand's worm-infested heart as a keepsake. Meanwhile Eph, Nora, and Zach board the last train allowed to leave New York to deliver Zach to his grandparents in Georgia. Eph and Nora will then travel to Washington, D.C. to build the vampire bioweapon. They unknowingly are sitting next to Rudyard Fonescu, who sold the Occido Lumen to Creem. Vampires derail the train as it moves through the tunnel. Nora and Zach, separated from Eph, escape into an adjoining subway tunnel. Kelly appears and infects Nora, after which Kelly takes Zach away with her. Eph finds Nora, and, making peace with him, she then touches her sword to the third rail, electrocuting herself. Meanwhile, Fet, Setrakian, Quinlan, Gus, and Angel escape in a stolen tug boat.

=== Season 3 (2016) ===
No. overall	No. in season	Title	Directed by	Teleplay by	Original release date	Prod. code	U.S. viewers (millions)
27	1	"New York Strong"	J. Miles Dale	Carlton Cuse & Chuck Hogan	August 28, 2016	XSN03001	1.35
After Nora's death and Zach's kidnapping, Eph drinks more heavily but continues working on the anti-strigoi bioweapon for Feraldo. She says its fatality rate has dropped from 100% to 75%. Fet assists Navy SEALs in eliminating vampire nests and searching for the Master; however, Eichhorst lures the SEALS into a trap and the Master kills nearly the entire team. Setrakian, assisted by Mr. Quinlan, continues translating the Occido Lumen. Gus has his turned mother chained in their apartment, feeding her his own blood to sustain her. Kelly, accompanied by her surviving "feelers," goes to her and Eph's home in Queens, where Eph has been hiding out, hoping Zach will return. Kelly offers Zach in exchange for the Occido Lumen.
28	2	"Bad White"	J. Miles Dale	David Weddle & Bradley Thompson	September 4, 2016	XSN03002	0.99
After the Navy SEALS leave New York, Fet has a one-night stand with a woman named Kate. Eph rejoins Fet and Setrakian, who are pleased to see him. Quinlan, however, suspects Eph has ulterior motives. As Palmer's health deteriorates, he has his researchers attempt to replicate the "white", the Master's rejuvenating essence. When they fail, he meets with Setrakian and offers to abandon the Master in exchange for the "white" formula. Setrakian refuses, and later tells Fet they may be able to use Palmer's desperation to manipulate him. Eichhorst tells Palmer to influence Justine Feraldo to funnel more victims into the Freedom Centers. Meanwhile, Dutch has fallen in with her old hacker friends who abandon her during a strigoi attack. As Zach attempts to escape the Master's confines, he glimpses Kelly feeding, then, panicked, suffers an asthma attack. The Master treats him with the "white." Quinlan catches Eph attempting to steal the Occido Lumen. Quinlan proposes teaming up to lure the Master with the Lumen so that Quinlan can kill him and Eph can rescue Zach.
29	3	"First Born"	Ken Girotti	Chuck Hogan	September 11, 2016	XSN03003	1.11
Flashbacks depict Quinlan's past. An older woman, intrigued by Quinlan's strangeness, discovered him in a Roman gladiator camp. She believes he will "complete the prophecy". Quinlan tells Eph that the Master is his "father," but that he was conceived by humans. The Master infected his mother while she was pregnant, making Quinlan half-human, half strigoi. Killing the Master will result in Quinlan's own death. Angel discovers Gus is hiding his turned mother. When police "sweepers" inspect the building, they attempt to conceal her but are captured and conscripted to fight strigoi. Fet and Setrakian track Eph and Quinlan to recover the Occido Lumen, using the GPS device Fet hid inside the tome. Eph demands that the Master meet with him to exchange Zach for the Lumen. During the exchange, Kelly tries tricking Eph with a "feeler" disguised as Zach. The Lumen's silver cover severely burns Kelly when she attempts to take it. Fet and Setrakian arrive and destroy the turned Navy SEALS that are aiding the Master. Quinlan beheads the Master, but a large crimson-colored strigoi worm crawls from the corpse and escapes. Eph and the others have the Lumen, but appear to have lost Quinlan.
30	4	"Gone But Not Forgotten"	Ken Girotti	Regina Corrado	September 18, 2016	XSN03004	0.99
During a taped interview with Feraldo, a TV reporter claims the police are forcing conscripted chain gangs to fight the strigoi. Feraldo denies the accusation, then does nothing to stop it after learning it is true. Eph treats Quinlan's wounds, though Quinlan expected to die after killing the Master. The ancients later tell Quinlan that the Master was not truly destroyed, as a crimson worm containing the Master's essence survived. Frustrated, Quinlan severs ties with the Ancients. Gus and Angel are the sole survivors after leading a conscripted "sweep team" through a strigoi-infested tunnel. Gus realizes the strigoi's actions no longer seem coordinated. Setrakian and Fet eject Eph from their premises after learning he helped Quinlan steal the Lumen to exchange it for Zach. Eichhorst sends two turned Feraldo-workers on a suicide mission to their former base of operations. C4 explosives implanted inside their bodies blow the worms everywhere, infecting many staff and killing others. Fet barely prevents Feraldo from being infected. Dutch stays with Eph at Fet's place, resulting in them drinking heavily together. When they go out at night, they encounter a strigoi controlled through the Master announcing he is still alive. Feraldo orders her police to confiscate the TV reporter's computers and video footage of Feraldo's interview, then has the woman arrested.
31	5	"Madness"	Deran Sarafian	Liz Phang	September 25, 2016	XSN03005	0.88
Many world cities have been infected as strigoi numbers grow exponentially. Eph and Dutch have been capturing strigoi for Eph's biological experiments. Elsewhere, Fet follows two strigoi implanted with GPS trackers. Setrakian and Quinlan continue studying the Lumen. Quinlan and Setrakian note each other's strigoi-hunting obsession, to a point where other hunters were driven mad. Eldritch Palmer, in rapidly declining health, meets Eichhorst's new associate, Sanjay Desai. Eichhorst is pleased when Palmer reports that a cargo shipment from Egypt is on schedule. While performing a strigoi necropsy, Eph discovers that microwaves affect the creature's crude central nervous system, disrupting their collective communication ability. Justine Feraldo and Captain Frank Kowalski are dismayed that strigoi have infiltrated previously secured areas of Manhattan. Fet encounters strigoi digging tunnels for their brethren to enter the city through Central Park. He also discovers a massive strigoi nest. In a flashback scene set in 1972, Setrakian poses as a seller of a fake Occido Lumen to lure and entrap Eichhorst. Instead, he encounters Dr. Draverhaven, the sadistic Nazi doctor turned sentient strigoi. Setrakian overpowers the doctor, eventually dumping him alive into the North Sea, trapped inside a steamer trunk. In the present, Setrakian discovers text hidden within the Lumen's pages: the Master can be defeated by containing him in a silver-lined sarcophagus. Setrakian enlists Palmer's help, offering a dose of the "white" in exchange for learning the identity of the Master's new host body and his whereabouts. Further testing by Eph and Dutch reveals the strigoi can quickly adapt to the microwave interference.
32	6	"The Battle of Central Park"	Deran Sarafian	Bradley Thompson & David Weddle	October 2, 2016	XSN03006	0.80
As part of an all-out assault to reclaim Central Park, Feraldo sends Fet and NYPD captain Kate Rodgers, the woman Fet recently slept with, on a dangerous mission to wipe out the underground strigoi nest. Eichhorst and Kelly give Zach a Feeler as his protector. In Central Park, Eph and Dutch gather more strigoi communication data. Gus and Angel escape the chain-gang and run into Fet and Kate. Gus joins them while Angel takes Maria, another conscripted fighter, to safety. Kelly moves Zach to a new location, but he leaves a message behind for Eph. Fet, Gus, and Kate destroy the strigoi nest, but a massive strigoi counterattack overwhelms the NYPD's checkpoints. The nest was a decoy to lure police into the open, forcing Ferraldo to order an immediate withdrawal. Eph finds and searches Zach's vacated room. Eichhorst arrives and taunts him, and in the ensuing confrontation, Dutch severs Eichhorst's hand, forcing his retreat. Feraldo orders a full withdrawal as strigoi overrun Central Park.
33	7	"Collaborators"	TJ Scott	Chuck Hogan & Glen Whitman	October 9, 2016	XSN03007	0.82
Fet and Setrakian travel to a Brooklyn pawnshop to gather silver for building a sarcophagus to imprison the Master in. They first stop at Fet's parents' apartment, finding they committed suicide after being infected. Fet recounts how his grandfather, a WWII prisoner of war, also committed suicide, haunted for years by having been a Nazi collaborator who executed Jewish prisoners in exchange for better treatment. Eph and Dutch isolate a signal they believe is the Master's voice. They and Quinlan travel to JFK Airport to retrieve the black box from the airplane the Master flew to America in. They need a pure sample of his voice to compare with their signal. A dying Palmer and his security team board the ship, Aurora Cutlass, in search of its mysterious cargo from Egypt. The crew is dead and the cargo hold empty. In exchange for his promise to track down the Cutlass's cargo, Setrakian gives Palmer a single dose of the "white," which revives him.
34	8	"White Light"	TJ Scott	Regina Corrado & Liz Phang	October 16, 2016	XSN03008	0.85
Eichhorst inspects the processing plant for harvesting human blood. He is angry that Sanjay Desai did not use live subjects to test the system. He brutally uses Desai's assistant as a subject, killing him. Gus' turned mother returns to their apartment and attempts to attack Angel, forcing Gus to shoot her. Flashbacks depict how Gus' maternal uncles made his abusive father "disappear"; in the present day, Gus and Angel decide to leave New York. With a rejuvenated Eldritch Palmer's assistance, Setrakian and Fet gain access to the Freedom Center where they interrogate the Aurora Cutlass ship agent and learn the Egyptian cargo was taken to the processing center. Palmer admits that over a hundred similar blood plants are being built in North America. Fet and Setrakian invade the processing center, but Eichhorst, Desai, and their subordinates escape with the cargo. While playing the black box recording of the Master's paralyzing signal, Dutch collapses. Eph revives her and, later, the two become intimate. During a meeting to form a new alliance, Quinlan and the Ancients are ambushed by Eichhorst and a strigoi army. Quinlan escapes as Eichhorst detonates an atomic bomb that destroys the Ancients' hideout.
35	9	"Do or Die"	Vincenzo Natali	David Weddle & Bradley Thompson	October 23, 2016	XSN03009	0.94
A flashback to the early 1960s depicts Palmer seeking a position within his estranged wealthy father's corporation. Mr. O'Neil rebuffs his illegitimate son and offers Palmer a $10,000 check to sever their ties. Bitter and dejected, Palmer invests the money into building his own corporation, naming it Stoneheart as a nod to his uncaring, cold-hearted father. In the present, the NYPD leave New York; a few captains stay behind with Justine Feraldo. Fet goes to warn Eph and Dutch that the police have left and the city will fall within two days. Dutch and Eph opt to stay and continue working on their invention. The device works, disrupting attacking strigois' communication ability and rendering them inert. Gus and Angel come to the aid of Feraldo, Captain Kowalski, and the remaining NYPD captains as strigoi attack their vehicle in the street. All are killed except Gus, who escapes to safety. Quinlan survived Eichhorst's attack on the Ancients and regroups with Setrakian and Fet. Eph and Dutch have brought the device, claiming it will incapacitate the Master. Fet, however, wants Eph to leave. Meanwhile, Palmer and his security team locate the Aurora Cutlass cargo and capture Sanjay Desai. The crate contains a nuclear bomb, one of two that Eichhorst had smuggled from Russia by way of Egypt. Eichhorst used one bomb to destroy the ancients. Palmer confiscates the remaining weapon and lures Eichhorst into a trap where he and his team brutally shoot him. Severely wounded, Eichhorst leaps down the elevator shaft, his fate unknown. With limited time before the Master learns what happened, Palmer must immediately meet with Setrakian.
36	10	"The Fall"	Carlton Cuse	Carlton Cuse & Chuck Hogan	October 30, 2016	XSN03010	0.89
Palmer and Setrakian devise a plan to lure the Master to Stoneheart headquarters so that Eph, Fet, Dutch, Setrakian, and Quinlan can entrap him in the silver-lined sarcophagus. However, the Master, who has taken a new body, ambushes Palmer and transfers his essence into him, gaining Palmer's memories. The Master retrieves the remaining nuclear bomb from Palmer's vault and revives the mortally wounded Eichhorst. The latter leaves to plant the bomb in the Statue of Liberty, giving Kelly the detonator that is later taken by Zach. Eph and Setrakian meet with Palmer but quickly realize it is the Master and battle him. Dutch activates the strigoi disruption device, crippling the Master; Quinlan, Fet, Eph, and Setrakian seal the Master into the silver-lined sarcophagus. Eph, slightly wounded, stays behind to treat himself, as the others take the sarcophagus to dump it into the Atlantic. Kelly, accompanied by Zach, enters Palmer's office and attacks Eph, forcing him to kill her in self-defense. Enraged over his mother's death, Zach vengefully detonates the bomb. The explosion's shockwave frees the Master from the sarcophagus, and the resulting nuclear debris obscures the sun, allowing the strigoi to walk freely in daylight. Eichhorst leaves with Zach, while Setrakian's group is forced underground to avoid nuclear fallout and rampaging strigoi. Outside amid the chaos, Eph searches for Zach.

=== Season 4 (2017) ===
No. overall	No. in season	Title	Directed by	Teleplay by	Original release date	Prod. code	U.S. viewers (millions)
37	1	"The Worm Turns"	J. Miles Dale	Carlton Cuse & Chuck Hogan	July 16, 2017	XSN04001	1.44
Nine months have passed since "Illumination Day", the day the bomb was detonated, leading to a nuclear war that created a nuclear winter. The strigoi, now freely roaming the streets in the dim daylight, have enslaved humanity and established a dictatorship called "The Partnership", aided by human collaborators. Quinlan, Fet, and his new companion Charlotte, are in North Dakota searching for nuclear weapons to destroy the strigoi. When a trio of female survivalists captures Fet and Charlotte, Fet meets Daniel Roman, a fellow captive and a military officer formerly stationed at a nearby missile silo. Quinlan frees them and the group heads for the missile silo. Meanwhile in Philadelphia, Eph anonymously works odd jobs to survive. Captured by the Master's forces, Eph is freed when the bus transporting him and other human prisoners is blown up by Jason, a resistance fighter. Eph, the only survivor, helps the wounded Jason get away. Alex, Jason's sister, bargains with Eph to stay on until Jason recovers. Over Eichhorst's objections, the Master continues grooming Zach, saying he has dark potential.
38	2	"The Blood Tax"	J. Miles Dale	Liz Phang	July 23, 2017	XSN04002	0.91
Gus and Alonso Creem are operating a black market operation. While looting a supply facility where his cousin Raul works, Gus and his team are discovered but get away. When Creem objects to Gus returning with his cousin, Gus insists he stays. Dutch is held captive in a facility run by Sanjay Desai where women whose blood type is B+ are used for breeding. Dutch and another woman are caught attempting to escape. Flashbacks show that Dutch and Setrakian were captured during a strigoi-led round-up, then were separated. Dutch re-hid the Lumen before being caught. When the Philadelphia resistance group's operations base is uncovered, Eph offers them another hideout. He stays on after the group agrees to intensify their anti-strigoi attacks.
39	3	"One Shot"	Kevin Dowling	Bradley Thompson & David Weddle	July 30, 2017	XSN04003	0.86
Fet, Charlotte, Quinlan, and Captain Daniel Roman locate the nuclear warhead. Quinlan is wounded by a soldier guarding the missile silo but will recover. The strigoi have removed a key detonating component, and the group sets out to retrieve it. In Philadelphia, Eph and the resistance fighters poison a container truck of human blood intended for strigoi consumption. Over two thousand strigoi are fatally poisoned but the mission's success alerts the Master and Eichhorst to Eph's whereabouts. Meanwhile, Zach, bored and lonely, befriends Abby, the young girl working as a maid at his building. The Master, suspecting Zach's allegiance is faltering, tells him he can either support his cause or leave and live hand-to-mouth like other humans. Zach reaffirms his loyalty to the Master. Eph discovers that the strigoi are transporting unknown cargo to various towns via the railroads.
40	4	"New Horizons"	Kevin Dowling	Mickey Fisher	August 6, 2017	XSN04004	1.17
Eichhorst orders Desai to shorten the women's pregnancies to six months so they can produce two infants per year. Infant B+ blood is a strigoi delicacy. Desai forces Dutch to coach women during their deliveries. Meanwhile she plots to steal an employee key card to escape. Strigoi invade the school building where Eph, Alex, and the other resistance fighters are hiding out. Jason, Alex's brother, is infected, forcing Eph to shoot him. Eph and Alex find another hideout where Eph reveals to Alex his and Zach's involvement in "Illumination Day." He discovers that the strigoi are using trains to transport human volunteers, under the guise of recruiting workers for "New Horizons Farms". A rival gang hits Gus and Creem's black market operation, claiming their territory. Gus locates their lair and discovers they are fully armed, ex-NYPD cops. He coordinates and leads a successful counter-attack, killing them and capturing their merchandise. At the birth center, Dutch attacks Desai and takes his key card. While attempting to escape, she accidentally runs into the processing facility where humans' blood is being drained.
41	5	"Belly of the Beast"	Norberto Barba	Jeff Wadlow	August 13, 2017	XSN04005	0.93
After Eichhorst recaptures Dutch, she learns that the Partnership is holding Setrakian as a medical test subject. She rescues him, severely injuring Eichhorst as they escape. Fet, Quinlan, Charlotte, and Roman successfully attack a Partnership convoy and retrieve the nuclear missile's detonating component. During flashbacks to 19th-century London, Quinlan encounters Louisa, a woman who hopes to use his powers to revive her dying brother, and who is strongly attracted to his monstrous nature; it is revealed the Master arrived in London at that time. In the present, Eph and Alex travel to the countryside to continue investigating the Master's New Horizons "farms". They discover these are concentration camps to house humans as livestock for strigoi consumption. Speaking through a newly-turned strigoi, the Master taunts Eph, saying Zach is alive and has dark potential.
42	6	"Tainted Love"	Norberto Barba	Paul Keables	August 20, 2017	XSN04006	0.79
Zach is upset to discover that Abby has a boyfriend. When she rebuffs him, saying he is too young, he allows his Feeler bodyguard to turn her when she attempts to leave. In flashbacks to 19th-century England, Quinlan is part of Louisa and her daughter, Lydia's family. Upon learning the Master is in London, he leaves to battle him, ignoring Louisa's pleas to stay. When he hesitates striking the fatal blow due to his attachment to his new family, the Master escapes and turns Louisa and Lydia, forcing Quinlan to release them. In the present, Quinlan demands that Fet leave Charlotte behind before they leave for New York with the nuclear weapon, fearing she will distract Fet from their mission. When Fet broaches the subject to Charlotte, she claims she never intended to accompany him there. The group procures a plane to fly to New York. Before Fet boards, Charlotte pleads with him to come with her; he refuses to abandon the mission and departs with Quinlan and Roman. Eichhorst, pursuing the group, attempts to shoot down the plane but Charlotte shoots him.
43	7	"Ouroboros"	Thomas Carter	Andy Iser	August 27, 2017	XSN04007	0.89
Fet, Quinlan, and Roman land in Long Island and head to Manhattan with the nuclear warhead. To stop them, Desai destroys all bridges and tunnels into Manhattan. Setrakian and Dutch retrieve the Lumen before finding a new hideout. Setrakian discovers a clue within the Lumen symbols before he collapses. Eph returns to New York with Alex and reunites with Dutch and Setrakian. Eph treats Setrakian with free medical supplies from Gus. Creem, angry over Gus' generosity, tries cutting a deal with the Master in exchange for Setrakian's location but he is turned instead. Setrakian gives Eph the formula to make him the restorative white. While Eph and Dutch are away, Setrakian has another revelation about the Lumen but Eichhorst and Creem arrive. Alex is killed and Eichhorst beats Setrakian. Gus, with Raul, returns to Setrakian's hideout, forcing Eichhorst to flee. Raul is killed and Creem ambushes Gus. Setrakian impales Eichhorst, saving Gus, who kills Creem. Eichhorst stings Setrakian and starts draining him, but Setrakian has taken a massive dose of the blood thinner that Eph gave him, poisoning his old foe. Setrakian speaks to the Master through Eichhorst, warning that the Master's defeat is inevitable. He then beheads Eichhorst.
44	8	"Extraction"	Paco Cabezas	Liz Phang	September 3, 2017	XSN04008	1.01
Eph and Dutch return to the hideout to find Eichhorst, Alex, and Creem are dead and Setrakian infected and dying. Fet, Quinlan, and Roman procure a boat and sneak the nuclear bomb into Manhattan and hide it at the Federal Reserve Bank. Fet and Quinlan leave Roman to guard the bomb, then locate the others at the hideout. Setrakian shares that rather than using the bomb, the Master can be defeated by separating him from his collaborators. Setrakian then asks to be released, and Quinlan beheads him. Eph, Dutch, Fet, Gus, and several cohorts infiltrate the blood center, freeing the captives and apprehending Desai to uncover the Master's whereabouts. Meanwhile, the Master tasks Zach with an important mission. Eph learns that Zach has been spotted near the market by Harlem River and finds him there.
45	9	"The Traitor"	Jennifer Lynch	David Weddle & Bradley Thompson	September 10, 2017	XSN04009	0.84
Fet and Dutch interrogate Desai, to no avail. However, after Quinlan threatens to drain his wife, Desai reveals the Master's location. Gus arrives to help Roman guard the bomb and also gather silver from the Federal Reserve Bank for weapons against the strigoi. Meanwhile, Eph doubts Zach's account of his time with the Master. When Zach purposely leaves a blood scent for the Feelers, Eph realizes his betrayal. Zach confesses he lied and offers to spare his father if he tells him where the nuke is hidden. Eph almost kills Zach but leaves him behind when the team immediately evacuates and meets up with Gus and Roman. The Master arrives and berates Zach for his failure. To save himself, Desai falsely accuses his wife of betraying the Master, but the Master knows he's lying and kills them both. The team sets off to detonate the nuke at the Empire State Building. Quinlan enters with the detonator, finding the Master gone. When strigoi surround him, he radios the others to leave, but a strigoi horde blocks their escape.
46	10	"The Last Stand"	J. Miles Dale	Chuck Hogan & Carlton Cuse	September 17, 2017	XSN04010	1.00
Eph, Fet, and Dutch escape with the nuclear weapon while Gus and Roman fend off the strigoi horde. The humans later regroup with Quinlan and devise a plan to eradicate the Master without destroying the city. To Dutch's dismay, Fet intends to sacrifice himself by detonating the bomb in a deep tunnel after he and Quinlan trap the Master there. The Master orders a final purge of Manhattan to flush out the team, shocking Zach. Eph and Fet lure the Master and a strigoi horde to their hideout. When Zach is trapped below ground with the Master and Quinlan, Eph follows with the detonator. The Master fatally injures Quinlan in a vicious battle. Zach is unable to kill his father on the Master's order; when the Master attempts to transfer his essence to Zach, Eph attacks him. The Master instead possesses Eph, who is able to arm the bomb before the Master assumes control. The Master believes he has won, but Zach triggers the bomb, destroying the Master and killing himself. Five years later, the nuclear winter is subsiding, humanity has recovered and destroyed all but a few strigoi that are kept captive. Roman becomes a property developer; Gus helps resettle refugees and hopes to find Anya; Dutch and other former hackers are rebuilding the Internet; and Fet resumes being an exterminator. Fet and Dutch reunite on a hopeful note.

== Ratings ==
The Strain : U.S. viewers per episode (millions)

Season	Episode number													Average
Season	1	2	3	4	5	6	7	8	9	10	11	12	13	Average
1	2.99	2.12	2.30	2.27	2.03	2.28	2.43	1.91	1.87	2.22	2.28	1.97	2.09	2.21
2	1.66	1.63	1.47	1.38	1.26	1.44	0.95	1.36	1.15	1.30	1.42	1.23	1.17	1.34
3	1.35	0.99	1.11	0.99	0.88	0.80	0.82	0.85	0.94	0.89	–			0.96
4	1.44	0.91	0.86	1.17	0.93	0.79	0.89	1.01	0.84	1.00	–			0.99

Audience measurement performed by Nielsen Media Research
