= The Strain (franchise) =

Novel series by Guillermo del Toro and Chuck Hogan

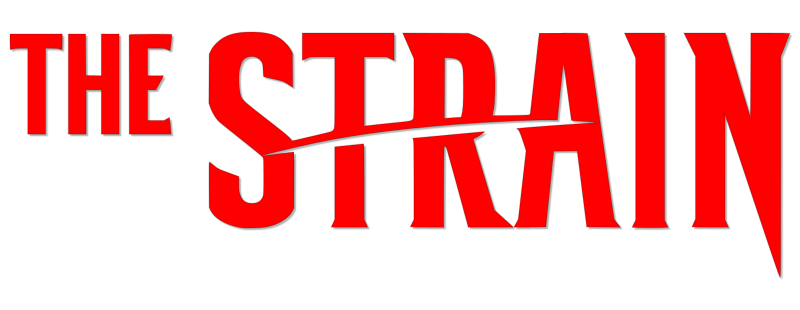
- Created by: Guillermo del Toro; Chuck Hogan
- Original work: The Strain (2009)

Print publications
- Comics: The Strain (2011–2015); Mister Quinlan – Vampire Hunter (2016–2017)

Films and television
- Television series: The Strain (2014–2017)

The Strain is an American vampire horror media franchise created by Guillermo del Toro and Chuck Hogan.

Del Toro first envisioned the story line as a television series, but was unable to find a broadcaster who was interested. A friend then suggested turning the story into a series of books with writer Chuck Hogan.

A television adaptation premiered on FX in 2014, concluding in 2017 after 46 episodes.

== Novels ==
Co-written by Guillermo del Toro and Chuck Hogan. Published by William Morrow and Company.

No.	Title	Date	ISBN
1	The Strain	June 2, 2009	978-0-06-155823-8
2	The Fall	September 21, 2010	978-0-06-155822-1
3	The Night Eternal	October 25, 2011	978-0-06-155826-9

== Comic books ==
Published by Dark Horse Comics.

=== The Strain (2011–2013) ===
The Strain is a limited comic book series written by David Lapham, with artist Mike Huddleston. It was adapted from the novel of the same name. The first issue received positive reviews.

Issue	Issue date	Collection	Date	ISBN
1	December 14, 2011	The Strain, Vol 1	October 15, 2012	978-1-61655-032-5
2	January 11, 2012	The Strain, Vol 1	October 15, 2012	978-1-61655-032-5
3	February 8, 2012	The Strain, Vol 1	October 15, 2012	978-1-61655-032-5
4	March 14, 2012	The Strain, Vol 1	October 15, 2012	978-1-61655-032-5
5	June 13, 2012	The Strain, Vol 1	October 15, 2012	978-1-61655-032-5
6	July 11, 2012	The Strain, Vol 1	October 15, 2012	978-1-61655-032-5
7	August 8, 2012	The Strain, Vol. 2	June 5, 2013	978-1-61655-156-8
8	September 12, 2012	The Strain, Vol. 2	June 5, 2013	978-1-61655-156-8
9	December 12, 2012	The Strain, Vol. 2	June 5, 2013	978-1-61655-156-8
10	January 9, 2013	The Strain, Vol. 2	June 5, 2013	978-1-61655-156-8
11	February 13, 2013	The Strain, Vol. 2	June 5, 2013	978-1-61655-156-8

=== The Fall (2013–2014) ===
The Strain: The Fall was written by David Lapham, with artist Mike Huddleston. It was adapted from the novel of the same name.

Issue	Issue date	Collection	Date	ISBN
1	July 17, 2013	The Strain, Vol. 3	February 5, 2014	978-1-61655-333-3
2	August 21, 2013	The Strain, Vol. 3	February 5, 2014	978-1-61655-333-3
3	September 18, 2013	The Strain, Vol. 3	February 5, 2014	978-1-61655-333-3
4	October 16, 2013	The Strain, Vol. 3	February 5, 2014	978-1-61655-333-3
5	November 20, 2013	The Strain, Vol. 4	July 2, 2014	978-1-61655-449-1
6	December 18, 2013	The Strain, Vol. 4	July 2, 2014	978-1-61655-449-1
7	January 15, 2014	The Strain, Vol. 4	July 2, 2014	978-1-61655-449-1
8	February 19, 2014	The Strain, Vol. 4	July 2, 2014	978-1-61655-449-1
9	March 19, 2014	The Strain, Vol. 4	July 2, 2014	978-1-61655-449-1

=== The Night Eternal (2014–2015) ===
The Strain: The Night Eternal was written by David Lapham, with artist Mike Huddleston. It was adapted from a novel of the same name.

Issue	Issue date	Collection	Date	ISBN
1	August 20, 2014	The Strain, Vol. 5	May 6, 2015	978-1-61655-638-9
2	September 17, 2014	The Strain, Vol. 5	May 6, 2015	978-1-61655-638-9
3	October 15, 2014	The Strain, Vol. 5	May 6, 2015	978-1-61655-638-9
4	November 19, 2014	The Strain, Vol. 5	May 6, 2015	978-1-61655-638-9
5	January 21, 2015	The Strain, Vol. 5	May 6, 2015	978-1-61655-638-9
6	February 18, 2015	The Strain, Vol. 5	May 6, 2015	978-1-61655-638-9
7	March 18, 2015	The Strain, Vol. 6	December 2, 2015	978-1-61655-787-4
8	April 15, 2015	The Strain, Vol. 6	December 2, 2015	978-1-61655-787-4
9	May 20, 2015	The Strain, Vol. 6	December 2, 2015	978-1-61655-787-4
10	June 17, 2015	The Strain, Vol. 6	December 2, 2015	978-1-61655-787-4
11	July 15, 2015	The Strain, Vol. 6	December 2, 2015	978-1-61655-787-4
12	August 19, 2015	The Strain, Vol. 6	December 2, 2015	978-1-61655-787-4

=== Hardcover collections (2014–2016) ===
Collections of each series in a hardcover format.

No.	Title	Date	ISBN
1	The Strain	July 9, 2014	978-1-61655-548-1
2	The Fall	April 22, 2015	978-1-61655-836-9
3	The Night Eternal	May 25, 2016	978-1-61655-977-9

=== Mister Quinlan (2016–2017) ===
The Strain: Mister Quinlan – Vampire Hunter is a limited series that explores the origins of the vampire Quintus Sertorius, later known as Quinlan. Written by David Lapham, with artist Edgar Salazar.

Issue	Release date	Collection	Date	ISBN
1	September 14, 2016	Mister Quinlan – Vampire Hunter, Vol. 1	May 3, 2017	978-1-5067-0160-8
2	October 12, 2016	Mister Quinlan – Vampire Hunter, Vol. 1	May 3, 2017	978-1-5067-0160-8
3	November 9, 2016	Mister Quinlan – Vampire Hunter, Vol. 1	May 3, 2017	978-1-5067-0160-8
4	December 14, 2016	Mister Quinlan – Vampire Hunter, Vol. 1	May 3, 2017	978-1-5067-0160-8
5	January 11, 2017	Mister Quinlan – Vampire Hunter, Vol. 1	May 3, 2017	978-1-5067-0160-8

== Television series ==
In 2012 it was announced that FX had ordered a pilot episode of The Strain with the intention of creating a limited television series based on the books. Before writing the book trilogy, del Toro had initially planned the books as a television series and stated that if picked up, the series would span three to five seasons. He also commented that he and Hogan would co-write the script for the pilot episode and that as of November 2012 he had already begun casting. Del Toro further commented that he planned to also direct the pilot episode, with a full season airing in 2014 if the show was picked up.

It was later announced that a second full season was ordered by FX to air in 2015. Following the fourth episode of season 2, FX renewed the series for a third season, after which the creators announced they hoped it would last for a total of 5 seasons. A fourth and final season was announced by FX on September 27, 2016, which premiered in July 2017.
