= The Night Eternal =

2011 novel by Guillermo del Toro and Chuck Hogan

- Hardcover edition
- Author: Guillermo del Toro; Chuck Hogan
- Language: English
- Genre: Horror novel
- Publisher: William Morrow and Company
- Publication date: October 25, 2011
- Publication place: United States
- Media type: Print, audio
- Pages: 371
- ISBN: 0061558273
- Preceded by: The Fall

The Night Eternal is a 2011 vampire horror novel by Guillermo del Toro and Chuck Hogan. It is the final novel in The Strain Trilogy beginning with The Strain and continuing with The Fall.

== Plot ==
Two years have passed since the vampires, led by the Master, used atomic weapons to create a nuclear winter, which blocked the sun and allowed the vampires to move freely, except for a few hours a day. The vampires restructured society as a police state. The strongest and the most influential humans were exterminated and those who were spared were made slaves. The weak were forced into camps to harvest their blood.

A few survivors manage to resist the vampire occupation. Epidemiologist Dr Ephraim Goodweather grows distant from his friends. The Master, occupying the body of rock star Gabriel Bolivar, adopted Goodweather's son Zach as his protégé and is grooming the boy to be his next host body. Goodweather's lover, Dr Nora Martinez, left him for exterminator Vasiliy Fet. Following the death of his friend Abraham Setrakian, Fet struggles to decipher the Occido Lumen, a tome holding the key to defeating the Master. He is aided by Mr Quinlan, the vengeful half-vampire who was created when the Master infected his then-pregnant human mother.

Flashbacks to biblical times reveal the origins of the vampire race. The seven Ancients, including the Master, arose from Ozryel - the archangel of death. Ozryel was one of the three angels that God sent to destroy the cities of Sodom and Gomorrah for their wickedness. Ozryel was overpowered by blood lust while he destroyed the cities, being particularly enthralled by blood itself. When committing other atrocities necessary for cleansing the world he had not actually glimpsed blood before destroying these cities. Soon after, he betrayed and attacked Michael to drink his fellow archangel's blood. Appalled by Ozryel's actions, God punished him by having the other archangels cut his body into seven pieces and scattering them across the Earth. Over time, Ozryel's blood leaked from the burial sites and became sentient, spawning the Ancient Ones. The Master was the last to spawn, from Ozryel's throat.

Goodweather deciphers the Occido Lumen and determines that the Master originated on one of the Thousand Islands located in the St Lawrence River. The survivors detonate a nuclear weapon on the island, killing Goodweather, Zach, Mr Quinlan, and the Master. After the explosion, Nora and Vasily witness a reunion of the purified Ozryel with Gabriel and Michael, who had come to take Ozryel back to Heaven. The return was only made possible by Mr Quinlan, who brought the Ancients' ashes with him after following the instructions he read in the Lumen. After the Master's death, the remaining vampires disintegrate and the surviving humans are able to rebuild society.

== Reception ==
Stephen King wrote: "Although there is a certain amount of dispensable hugger-mugger about vampires in Rome and archangels located in Sodom, the main attractions here is the resistance fighters' fierce dedication to their cause. Heroes of tragic dimension are rare in popular fiction, but Goodweather fills the void perfectly. [...] The action is non-stop and the fantasy element is anchored in enough satisfying detail to make it believable. [... ] There's something about seeing vampires massing for an attack in a Wendy's parking lot, an act making them more real." The San Francisco Chronicle's Alan Cheuse wrote: "The novel comes to us in a weird, loose style in which multiple view points proliferate, constantly shifting and re-forming the story, resembling nothing less than montage of fear-making moments that we love to hate."

== Adaptations ==
=== Comic books ===
Writer David Lapham and artist Mike Huddleston adapted the novel into an 11-issue story arc for the eponymous comic-book series from Dark Horse Comics.

Issue	Release date	Trade Paperback Collection	Hardcover Collection
1	August 20, 2014	The Strain — Volume 5: The Night Eternal; May 6, 2015; ISBN 978-1616556389	The Strain—Book Three; The Night Eternal; May 25, 2016; ISBN 978-1-61655-977-9
2	September 17, 2014	The Strain — Volume 5: The Night Eternal; May 6, 2015; ISBN 978-1616556389	The Strain—Book Three; The Night Eternal; May 25, 2016; ISBN 978-1-61655-977-9
3	October 15, 2014	The Strain — Volume 5: The Night Eternal; May 6, 2015; ISBN 978-1616556389	The Strain—Book Three; The Night Eternal; May 25, 2016; ISBN 978-1-61655-977-9
4	November 19, 2014	The Strain — Volume 5: The Night Eternal; May 6, 2015; ISBN 978-1616556389	The Strain—Book Three; The Night Eternal; May 25, 2016; ISBN 978-1-61655-977-9
5	January 21, 2015	The Strain — Volume 5: The Night Eternal; May 6, 2015; ISBN 978-1616556389	The Strain—Book Three; The Night Eternal; May 25, 2016; ISBN 978-1-61655-977-9
6	February 18, 2015	The Strain — Volume 5: The Night Eternal; May 6, 2015; ISBN 978-1616556389	The Strain—Book Three; The Night Eternal; May 25, 2016; ISBN 978-1-61655-977-9
7	March 18, 2015	The Strain — Volume 6: The Night Eternal; December 2, 2015; ISBN 978-1616557874	The Strain—Book Three; The Night Eternal; May 25, 2016; ISBN 978-1-61655-977-9
8	April 15, 2015	The Strain — Volume 6: The Night Eternal; December 2, 2015; ISBN 978-1616557874	The Strain—Book Three; The Night Eternal; May 25, 2016; ISBN 978-1-61655-977-9
9	May 20, 2015	The Strain — Volume 6: The Night Eternal; December 2, 2015; ISBN 978-1616557874	The Strain—Book Three; The Night Eternal; May 25, 2016; ISBN 978-1-61655-977-9
10	June 17, 2015	The Strain — Volume 6: The Night Eternal; December 2, 2015; ISBN 978-1616557874	The Strain—Book Three; The Night Eternal; May 25, 2016; ISBN 978-1-61655-977-9
11	July 15, 2015	The Strain — Volume 6: The Night Eternal; December 2, 2015; ISBN 978-1616557874	The Strain—Book Three; The Night Eternal; May 25, 2016; ISBN 978-1-61655-977-9
12	August 19, 2015	The Strain — Volume 6: The Night Eternal; December 2, 2015; ISBN 978-1616557874	The Strain—Book Three; The Night Eternal; May 25, 2016; ISBN 978-1-61655-977-9

=== Television series ===
Executive producer and showrunner Carlton Cuse adapted the novel into the 10-episode third and fourth season of the eponymous television series from FX.
