= Night Zero (The Strain) =

- The Strain episode
- Episode no.: Season 1 Episode 1
- Directed by: Guillermo del Toro
- Teleplay by: Guillermo del Toro; Chuck Hogan
- Original air date: July 13, 2014
- Running time: 70 minutes

Episode chronology
| ← Previous — | Next → "The Box" |

"Night Zero" is the first episode of the American television series The Strain. It first aired on FX on July 13, 2014.

== Plot ==
A disturbance inside the cargo hold of an inbound jet to JFK International Airport alarms the flight crew. Upon landing, the plane immediately loses all contact with ground control and all but one window shade are drawn. It is feared everyone aboard is incapacitated, possibly by a contagion or some other mechanism. The CDC Canary team, headed by Dr. Ephraim Goodweather, is called to investigate. Goodweather and Dr. Nora Martinez enter the plane, finding all passengers seemingly dead. They also discover strange parasitic worms on the plane and fear an Ebola-like plague could break out. Four people are unexpectedly found alive, including the pilot, Doyle Redfern, though none know what happened. While at JFK, Goodweather is approached by Abraham Setrakian, an elderly Armenian Harlem pawnbroker who insists the victims' bodies must be destroyed and the elaborately carved, coffin-like cabinet that was removed from the stricken plane's hold must not leave the airport. An airport official is attacked and killed by an enormous human-like creature that uses a throat appendage to suck out blood, before smashing his head. Meanwhile, recently paroled Gus Elizalde is hired by Mr. Eichhorst, a mysterious man connected to Eldrich Palmer, a wealthy and powerful entrepreneur. Gus is to retrieve the cabinet from the airport, and Eichhorst assures him there will be no difficulty in removing it. When Eph and Nora discover the cabinet missing, they are unaware that Jim Kent, their CDC co-worker, allowed its release from the quarantine area after seeing a business card given to Gus by Eichorst. A pathologist examines several of the bodies, finding perfectly made incisions in their necks and strange growths on their hearts. While Examining a heart, the pathologist witnesses numerous worms come out from it before he is attacked by the now risen corpses of the victims. As Gus drives the coffin into the city, Emma, one of the deceased passengers arrives home into the arms of her grieving father.

== Production ==
In September 2012, it was announced that FX had acquired the rights to The Strain trilogy of novels by Guillermo del Toro and Chuck Hogan, and ordered a pilot episode to be directed and executive produced by del Toro and co-written by del Toro and Hogan. Carlton Cuse would help develop the project and serve as executive producer and showrunner on the series, which was envisioned as having a limited run of three to five seasons.

The pilot episode began principal photography on September 17, 2013, in Toronto, Canada. The 13-episode series order was announced on November 19, 2013. The airport scenes were filmed at Toronto International Airport, and the interior airplane scenes were filmed on the same set used in Stoll's previous film Non-Stop. The pilot adapts the first 150 pages of the first novel, which is 300 pages long. The remainder of the first season comprises an expanded version of the novel's second half.

Lauren Lee Smith was originally cast as Kelly Goodweather, but was replaced by Natalie Brown two weeks before production on the pilot began. John Hurt played Abraham Setrakian in the original version of the pilot. Principal photography was postponed to accommodate Hurt's shooting schedule. Hurt dropped out after filming, and was replaced by David Bradley for the series; del Toro reshot Hurt's scenes with the new actor.

== Reception ==
Early reviews followed the episode's world premiere at the ATX Television Festival in Austin, Texas in June 2014. Writing for the International Business Times, Amanda Remling called it "one of del Toro's most jaw-dropping creations yet", praising the focus on suspense rather than gore, and favorably compared the "insane" closing sequence to the "mind-blowing deaths" on Game of Thrones and The Walking Dead. Meredith Borders of Badass Digest said that the pilot looked "incredibly cinematic and, frankly, expensive", but opined that it would have benefited from a longer runtime and slower pace. She said that the episode was not necessarily scary, but "a lot of fun", with moments that were "incredibly gory in a way that will make the most ardent grue-lover clap with glee". She praised the cast, particularly Corey Stoll, who had her "rooting for a complicated character in the first sixty seconds of our acquaintance with him".

Elizabeth Harper of The Escapist wrote that the episode had "the look and feel of del Toro's work" and was particularly reminiscent of Pacific Rim, "spinning a brightly colored world inhabited by an equally vibrant cast of characters." She said that the characters, while not "entirely unique", display "quirks that give them life beyond simple stereotypes", and wrote that the moody and dramatic lighting, while unnatural, added to the supernatural feeling and created a fittingly stylized world.
