= Mnemovore =

- Cover of Mnemovore #1

Publication information
- Publisher: Vertigo Comics/DC Comics
- Schedule: Monthly
- Format: Limited series
- Publication date: June–November 2005
- No. of issues: 6

Creative team
- Written by: Ray Fawkes; Hans Rodionoff
- Artist(s): Mike Huddleston

Mnemovore (/ˈniːməvɔːr/) is a six-issue comic book limited series published under the Vertigo imprint of American comic book publisher DC Comics. The comics were in the horror genre, and ran monthly from June 2005.

The series was co-written by Ray Fawkes and Hans Rodionoff, and illustrated (with painted covers) by Mike Huddleston.

== Plot summary ==
The story focuses on Kaley Markowic, a young snowboarder who suffers a career-ending head injury during a competition, and loses part of her memory. While trying to recuperate from her head trauma, she discovers that the memories of others are being consumed by an ancient monster known as the Mnemovore. Kaley's amnesia leaves her immune to the monster's attacks, and the only one who can stop it.

== Film ==
In October 2007, at the H.P. Lovecraft Film Festival in Portland, Oregon, Mnemovore co-creator Hans Rodionoff screened a 10-minute sample reel for a proposed feature film based on the comic book. The sample reel featured Kristen Bell as Kaley Markowic, and Michael Biehn as her therapist. Rodionoff said that the film would have been executive produced by Guillermo del Toro, and produced by Don Murphy and Susan Montford. Rodionoff has written the script, and was set to direct as well, but the film was never completed.
