= The Strain =

2009 novel by Guillermo del Toro and Chuck Hogan

- 2009 first edition hardback cover
- Author: Guillermo del Toro; & Chuck Hogan
- Language: English
- Genre: Horror novel
- Publisher: William Morrow
- Publication date: June 2, 2009
- Publication place: United States
- Media type: Print, audio
- Pages: 401
- ISBN: 0061558230
- Followed by: The Fall

The Strain is a 2009 vampire horror novel by Guillermo del Toro and Chuck Hogan. It is the first installment in The Strain Trilogy, and was followed by The Fall (2010) and The Night Eternal (2011).

== Plot synopsis ==
A Boeing 777 arrives at John F. Kennedy International Airport and is taxiing its way across the tarmac when it suddenly stops. All window shades are closed except one, the lights are out, and communication channels have gone silent. An alert is sent to the Centers for Disease Control and Prevention. Dr. Ephraim "Eph" Goodweather, head of the CDC's Canary Project, a rapid-response team that handles biological threats, is sent to investigate. Goodweather and Dr. Nora Martinez board the plane, finding everyone except four people dead.

In a pawnshop in Spanish Harlem, former history professor and Holocaust survivor Abraham Setrakian knows something terrible has happened and that an unnatural war is brewing. So begins a battle of mammoth proportions as the vampiric virus that has infected the passengers begins spilling out onto New York City's streets. Dr. Goodweather, who is joined by Setrakian and a small band of fighters, desperately tries to stop the contagion to save the city, and also his wife and son.

== Characters ==
=== Dr. Ephraim Goodweather ===
Head of the CDC's rapid-response team, the Canary Project, Eph is a newly divorced father attempting to balance the custody battle over his son Zack with his duties as an epidemiologist. He and his Canary team are the first response team to the Boeing 777 disaster, and are tasked with solving the mystery of the mass casualties. Unable to reconcile the symptoms of the newly infected airline passengers with standard disease pathology, Eph is convinced of the reality of vampires by Abraham Setrakian. Discredited at the CDC by the vampires' human conspirators, Eph finds himself a fugitive from both the human authorities and the undead. The need to protect his son drives Eph's every action.

In the television series, he is played by Corey Stoll.

=== Dr. Nora Martinez ===
A skilled epidemiologist, Nora is second-in-command of the Canary Project. She and Eph have been attempting an office romance with mixed success, complicated by their high-stress medical careers and Goodweather's lingering melancholy over his looming divorce. Nora quickly dedicates herself to uncovering the vampire conspiracy, and is determined not to be relegated to doing the "woman's work."

In the television series, she is played by Mía Maestro.

=== Professor Abraham Setrakian ===
A Romanian Jew (partly of Armenian descent), Setrakian was held in the Treblinka extermination camp during the Second World War, where he became aware of the Master feeding on the weak and sickly inmates. His first attempt to stop the Master was a failure, leaving him with multiple fractures in his hands that never healed properly. After escaping from the camp, he dedicated his life to hunting down the vampiric scourge for more than six decades. Originally a professor of East European literature and mythology at the University of Vienna, Setrakian was dismissed and forced to go into hiding after refusing to help Eldritch Palmer locate the Master. Wielding an ancient silver sword in his nearly crippled hands, Setrakian is an expert on vampire biology and destruction, and recruits Eph and Nora to his cause. His determination and will are strong, but his weak heart has become an obstacle to his lifelong quest. His name is a combination taken from Abraham Van Helsing from Bram Stoker’s novel Dracula and animatronics engineer Mark Setrakian who Del Toro has worked with on multiple projects.

In the television series, he is played by David Bradley, and by Jim Watson as a young man.

=== The Master ===
One of the seven original "Ancients", the propagators of the vampire race, the Master scorns the truce between the six others and intends to eliminate their strains and subjugate the entire human race. By the time of his arrival in New York, having spent nearly a millennium in Europe in various host bodies, the Master currently inhabits the body of Jusef Sardu, a 19th-century Polish nobleman afflicted with gigantism. Through the cooperation of Eldritch Palmer, promising the dying billionaire immortality, the Master has gained unlimited financial and political power to ensure the success of his plan.

In the television series, the Master is voiced by Robin Atkin Downes with Jusef Sardu portrayed by Robert Maillet. The Master's second host Gabriel Bolivar is played by Jack Kesy.

=== Thomas Eichorst ===
The Master's chief facilitator. He was a Nazi SS officer at a concentration camp whom the Master mutated into a Strigoi, a Renfield-type character but immortal. He killed Setrakian's wife in the past.

In the television series, he is played by Richard Sammel.

=== Vasiliy Fet ===
An exterminator of Ukrainian ancestry working for the New York City Bureau of Pest Control, Fet's occupation soon leads to his discovery of the truth about vampires while working in a derelict building. Reaching Eph through a professional connection at the CDC, the exterminator lends both his skills as a vermin hunter and his powerful physique to Setrakian and Goodweather's cause. Loyal and unwaveringly brave, he becomes a surrogate son to the old professor.

In the television series, he is played by Kevin Durand.

=== Augustin Elizalde (Gus) ===
A Mexican gang member fresh out of prison, Gus is attacked by a newly mutated vampire on the streets of Times Square and is subsequently arrested by the police after throwing the creature under a truck. Learning the truth about vampires from a temporarily incarcerated Setrakian, Gus escapes confinement and finds himself to be a natural vampire slayer on the streets of his tenement neighborhood. He is recruited by the three American Ancients as a "day hunter" against the Master's exponentially spreading hordes.

Gus shares his last name with makeup and special effects artist Mike Elizalde, who has frequently collaborated with Guillermo del Toro, including on del Toro's films Blade II, Hellboy and Hellboy II: The Golden Army.

In the television series, he is played by Miguel Gómez.

=== Eldritch Palmer ===
One of the richest men in the world, Eldritch Palmer craves the one thing that all his money cannot buy: immortality. The elderly tycoon's fear of death leads him to make a pact with the Master, trading his vast fortune, political influence, and the fate of the human race in exchange for an undead place at the vampire king's side. (His name is an in-joke reference to the 1965 Nebula Prize nominated novel The Three Stigmata of Palmer Eldritch by Philip K. Dick)

In the television series, he is played by Jonathan Hyde.

=== Dr. Everett Barnes ===
Dr. Everett Barnes is the Director of the Centers for Disease Control as well as Eph and Nora's direct superior. He is a shrewd bureaucrat who carefully maintains a quaint, "country doctor" image while possessing skills in the political and media aspects of the medical industry. His insistence upon wearing a Navy-style Public Health Service uniform, combined with his white goatee, make him resemble a "combat-decorated Colonel Sanders." When responding to the Boeing 777 crisis, he is more concerned with maintaining public order and the CDC's reputation than acknowledging the growing number of anomalies that point to something more sinister taking place.

In the television series, he is played by Daniel Kash.

=== Jim Kent ===
Eph and Nora's colleague, and the chief liaison between the Canary Project and the rest of the CDC. Well-meaning, he has nonetheless sold his services to Eldritch Palmer, who has recruited Kent as a spy under the guise of being concerned about any impending health crisis. Kent witnesses the mutation of Captain Redfern in the basement of the Jamaica Hospital Medical Center. In order to avoid news of the vampire infestation leaking out prematurely, Palmer has Kent and Gus retrieve the body of Captain Redfern and dispose of it. He is attacked during a gas station battle and begins mutating into a vampire. His life is subsequently ended after he begs Eph and Nora to kill him but they cannot.

In the television series, he is played by Sean Astin.

=== Kelly Goodweather ===
Eph's estranged wife and current opponent in a drawn-out custody battle over their only son, Kelly is a public school teacher and fiercely protective mother, pulling no punches in her attempt to paint her husband as the less suitable parent. Eph constantly worries about the growing influence of her milquetoast live-in boyfriend, Matt, on their son Zack. But when the Master begins sending out his followers, Kelly ends up becoming infected and becoming a means for the Master to track down Goodweather and the resistance.

In the television series, she is played by Natalie Brown.

=== Mr. Quinlan ===
Known as "the Born", Mr. Quinlan is a rare human/vampire hybrid, the son of the Master who is now the Ancients' chief hunter and bodyguard. He is efficient and loyal, recruiting Gus Elizalde to help him and his squad in their mission to kill his father. Mr. Quinlan is disgusted by his father's actions, and is determined to stop him at all costs.

In the television series, Mr. Quinlan was introduced in the fifth episode of Season 2, and is played by Rupert Penry-Jones.

== Reception ==
The Times Literary Supplement carried a review by Peter Millar dated 23 May 2009. The review praises the novel's "arresting start" and frequently alludes to Guillermo del Toro's career as a film director by comparing the novel to a Hollywood movie. The implication may be that del Toro intends to direct the film version of the novel. The review closes by calling The Strain a "rattling piece of escapism" with a "predictable" blockbuster ending. Xan Brooks of The Guardian calls the novel "a pulpy, apocalyptic fable" and a "fast-paced, high-concept outing that seems tailor-made for either a big-screen adaptation or - as Hogan has enthused - 'a long-form, cable-type TV series'. And yet at the same time this opening salvo also looks to the past; doffing its cap to an illustrious ancestor." He calls the vampires "mindless, undead leeches."

Less enthusiastically, Deirdre Crimmins described the novel as "an imperfect vampire book" marred by "some very awkwardly worded phrases and poorly described scenarios scattered throughout the book" and some "terribly clichéd" characters. Jeff Jensen, reviewing The Strain for Entertainment Weekly, wished for more evidence of del Toro's participation, saying, "It's hard to believe he found time for such an ambitious project — and after reading the book, it seems clear he didn't. ... The Strain is a competently constructed piece of entertainment, and I'll give it bonus points for shaking up some vampire clichés. ... The novel could have used a little less Hogan and little more del Toro."

== Adaptations ==
=== Comic books ===
Writer David Lapham and artist Mike Huddleston adapted the novel into an 11-issue story arc for the eponymous comic-book series from Dark Horse Comics.

Issue	Release date	Trade Paperback Collection	Hardcover Collection
1	December 14, 2011	The Strain — Volume 1 October 15, 2012; ISBN 978-1616550325	The Strain — Book One; July 9, 2014; ISBN 978-1616555481
2	January 11, 2012	The Strain — Volume 1 October 15, 2012; ISBN 978-1616550325	The Strain — Book One; July 9, 2014; ISBN 978-1616555481
3	February 8, 2012	The Strain — Volume 1 October 15, 2012; ISBN 978-1616550325	The Strain — Book One; July 9, 2014; ISBN 978-1616555481
4	March 14, 2012	The Strain — Volume 1 October 15, 2012; ISBN 978-1616550325	The Strain — Book One; July 9, 2014; ISBN 978-1616555481
5	June 13, 2012	The Strain — Volume 1 October 15, 2012; ISBN 978-1616550325	The Strain — Book One; July 9, 2014; ISBN 978-1616555481
6	July 11, 2012	The Strain — Volume 1 October 15, 2012; ISBN 978-1616550325	The Strain — Book One; July 9, 2014; ISBN 978-1616555481
7	August 8, 2012	The Strain — Volume 2 June 5, 2013; ISBN 9781616551568	The Strain — Book One; July 9, 2014; ISBN 978-1616555481
8	September 12, 2012	The Strain — Volume 2 June 5, 2013; ISBN 9781616551568	The Strain — Book One; July 9, 2014; ISBN 978-1616555481
9	December 12, 2012	The Strain — Volume 2 June 5, 2013; ISBN 9781616551568	The Strain — Book One; July 9, 2014; ISBN 978-1616555481
10	January 9, 2013	The Strain — Volume 2 June 5, 2013; ISBN 9781616551568	The Strain — Book One; July 9, 2014; ISBN 978-1616555481
11	February 13, 2013	The Strain — Volume 2 June 5, 2013; ISBN 9781616551568	The Strain — Book One; July 9, 2014; ISBN 978-1616555481

=== Television series ===
Executive producer and showrunner Carlton Cuse adapted the novel into the 13-episode first season of the eponymous television series from FX, which ran from July 13, 2014, to September 17, 2017.
