= Regina Corrado =

American television writer

- Occupation: Television Writer
- Writing career
- Notable work: Deadwood Sons of Anarchy The Strain

Regina Corrado is an American television writer. She has been nominated for two Writers Guild of America Awards for her work on Deadwood.

== Biography ==
Corrado joined the crew of HBO Western drama Deadwood as a writer for the second season in 2005. The series was created by David Milch and focuses on the growth of a settlement in the American West. Corrado wrote the episode "Childish Things". Corrado and the writing staff were also nominated for a Writers Guild of America Award for Outstanding Drama Series at the February 2006 ceremony for their work on the second season. She became a staff writer for the third and final season in 2006 and was promoted to story editor mid-season. She co-wrote the episode "I Am Not the Fine Man You Take Me For" with Milch. She co-wrote the episode "True Colors" with producer Ted Mann. She wrote the episode "Unauthorized Cinnamon". The third season writers were again nominated for the WGA Award for Outstanding Drama Series at the February 2007 ceremony.

In 2007 Corrado became an executive story editor for HBO surf noir John From Cincinnati. The series was created by Milch and Kem Nunn and focuses on the arrival of a messiah like figure in a surfing community. Corrado wrote the episode "His Visit: Day Three". The series was canceled after completing its first season.

In 2009 Corrado joined the crew of FX crime drama Sons of Anarchy as an executive story editor and writer for the second season. The series was created by Kurt Sutter and focuses on a California motorcycle gang. Corrado wrote the episode "Falx Cerebri".

She was promoted to co-producer for the third season in 2010. She co-wrote the episode "Caregiver" with producer Chris Collins, co-wrote the episode "Widening Gyre" with Sutter and co-wrote the episode "Bainne" with Sutter and co-executive producer Dave Erickson. Corrado was promoted again to producer for the fourth season. She co-wrote the third episode "Dorylus" with co-producer Liz Sagal. She co-wrote the sixth episode "With an X" with Collins.
