= The Fall (del Toro and Hogan novel) =

2010 novel by Guillermo del Toro and Chuck Hogan

- Hardcover edition
- Author: Guillermo del Toro; Chuck Hogan
- Language: English
- Genre: Horror novel
- Publisher: Harper
- Publication date: September 21, 2010
- Publication place: United States
- Media type: Print, audio
- Pages: 320
- ISBN: 0061558257
- Preceded by: The Strain
- Followed by: The Night Eternal

The Fall is a 2010 vampire horror novel by Guillermo del Toro and Chuck Hogan. It is the second novel in The Strain Trilogy, and was preceded by The Strain and followed by The Night Eternal.

== Plot synopsis ==
The vampire race is descended from seven vampiric "Ancient Ones." A vampire faction led by a renegade Ancient known as the Master instigates the takeover of human civilization. Elderly billionaire Eldritch Palmer, having been promised immortality by the Master, uses his influence to create a news blackout, ensuring that the vampires face little resistance. Abraham Setrakian, an elderly vampire hunter, is hopeful that the lost grimoire, Occido Lumen, holds the key to defeating the Master, and searches for it before the Master's forces take over. Setrakian is aided by epidemiologist Dr. Ephraim Goodweather and pest exterminator Vasiliy Fet, who have joined those resisting the vampires. Goodweather also seeks to protect his son, Zach, from his wife, Kelly, who is now a vampire and is driven by an animalistic instinct to convert her family. Meanwhile, the other Ancient Ones enlist gang member Gus Elizalde to destroy the Master.

== Characters ==
=== Dr. Ephraim Goodweather ===
Former head of the CDC's rapid-response team, the Canary Project, Eph is now a fugitive from the law, trying to prevent the vampire plague from spreading to the rest of the country, and to protect his son Zach from his recently turned ex-wife, Kelly. Having failed to kill the Master in the previous novel, Eph becomes obsessed with trying to kill Eldritch Palmer, convinced that the Master's plan will fail without Palmer's financial backing and campaign of disinformation.

=== Dr. Nora Martinez ===
Former second-in-command of the Canary Project, Nora takes an active role in fighting the spreading vampire plague, but finds herself growing distant from Eph, her former lover.

=== Professor Abraham Setrakian ===
A Holocaust survivor, who first encountered the Master in the Treblinka extermination camp in 1943, Setrakian has dedicated his life to destroying the Master. Having failed to do so through the normal vampire-killing methods, Setrakian re-dedicates himself to the search for the Occido Lumen, an ancient medieval manuscript that he believes contains the secret for eradicating the vampires. He is desperate to complete this quest before he dies of incipient heart disease.

=== The Master ===
One of the seven original "Ancients," the propagators of the vampire race. Having successfully crossed to America and overrun Manhattan, the Master now seeks to implement the next phase of his plan: causing a nuclear winter that allows only a few hours of sunlight per day. By the end of the novel, he has transferred his consciousness into the body of rock star Gabriel Bolivar. Though he is confident of his victory, he is vexed by Setrakian's efforts to obtain the Occido Lumen, the one thing he and the other Ancients fear.

=== Thomas Eichhorst ===
Former Nazi commandant of the Treblinka extermination camp where Setrakian was held. Eichhorst was transformed into a vampire shortly after World War II and has since been the Master's main servant. Eichhorst's knowledge about imprisonment and exterminating large numbers of people would be useful to the Master's "New Order." A fully mature vampire, Eichhorst nonetheless often dons prosthetics, a wig, and extensive makeup to appear human in order to perform the Master's will in public settings.

In the television series, he is played by Richard Sammel.

=== Vasiliy Fet ===
With his experience as an exterminator, Fet is useful in employing new strategies to defeat the strigoi. Although his extreme arrogance can sometimes be a road block for the group, Fet, on countless occasions, has assisted the group with a vast variety of ideas.

=== Augustin Elizalde ===
Recruited by the three American Ancients as a "day hunter" against the Master's strain, Gus assembles a rag-tag band of fighters, including aged luchador Angel and silver-toothed gangster Alfonso Creem.

=== Eldritch Palmer ===
Having successfully brought the Master to America, Palmer now employs his vast fortune and political influence to discredit Eph and anyone else trying to spread the word about the vampire plague. He has also spent the last ten years building a series of nuclear power plants all over the world in order to create the Master's nuclear winter. However, he is increasingly vexed by the Master's continued refusal to perform his side of their bargain, and transform Palmer into an immortal vampire.

=== Dr. Everett Barnes ===
The Director of the Centers for Disease Control, and Eph and Nora's former superior. Taken in at first by Palmer's disinformation campaign, Barnes eventually learns the truth, and decides to collaborate with Palmer and the Master, doing his best to ensure that the vampires' subjugation of the human race is as orderly and peaceful as possible. He comforts himself with the belief that there is no point in resisting the vampires, and all they can do is submit rather than risk the Master's wrath. Eph comes to despise Barnes almost as much as he hates Palmer.

=== Kelly Goodweather ===
Eph's former wife, now a vampiric drone driven by the need to infect him and their son, Zach.

=== Mr. Quinlan ===
Known as "the Born", Mr. Quinlan is a rare human/vampire hybrid—the son of a young woman long ago who, while pregnant, was then infected by the Master. Likely the most deadly and skilled hunter in all of human history, he has fought in everything from gladiatorial games in the Roman Colisseum, to modern battlefields. Today, he is the Ancients' chief hunter and bodyguard. He is efficient and loyal, recruiting Gus Elizalde to help him and his squad in their mission to kill the Master. Mr Quinlan is disgusted by his maker's actions, and is determined to stop him at all costs.

== Reception ==
Gina McIntyre of the Los Angeles Times wrote, "You have to hand it to del Toro and Hogan. At a time when brooding, sexy vampires are so ubiquitous in popular culture thanks to True Blood and Twilight, the authors finally have given the creatures back some of their nasty, vicious, delicious bite." The San Francisco Chronicle's Alan Cheuse wrote that "most readers will find themselves turning pages with the momentum of an engaged movie viewer", but criticized the pacing of the early sections, saying "the only problem the book has is that it is a middle volume in a trilogy".

== Adaptations ==
=== Comic books ===
Writer David Lapham and artist Mike Huddleston adapted the novel into a 9-issue story arc for the eponymous comic-book series from Dark Horse Comics.

Issue	Release date	Trade Paperback Collection	Hardcover Collection
1	July 17, 2013	The Strain — Volume 3: The Fall; February 5, 2014; ISBN 978-1616553333	The Strain — Book Two: The Fall; April 22, 2015; ISBN 978-1616558369
2	August 21, 2013	The Strain — Volume 3: The Fall; February 5, 2014; ISBN 978-1616553333	The Strain — Book Two: The Fall; April 22, 2015; ISBN 978-1616558369
3	September 18, 2013	The Strain — Volume 3: The Fall; February 5, 2014; ISBN 978-1616553333	The Strain — Book Two: The Fall; April 22, 2015; ISBN 978-1616558369
4	October 16, 2013	The Strain — Volume 3: The Fall; February 5, 2014; ISBN 978-1616553333	The Strain — Book Two: The Fall; April 22, 2015; ISBN 978-1616558369
5	November 20, 2013	The Strain — Volume 4: The Fall; July 2, 2014; ISBN 978-1616554491	The Strain — Book Two: The Fall; April 22, 2015; ISBN 978-1616558369
6	December 18, 2013	The Strain — Volume 4: The Fall; July 2, 2014; ISBN 978-1616554491	The Strain — Book Two: The Fall; April 22, 2015; ISBN 978-1616558369
7	January 15, 2014	The Strain — Volume 4: The Fall; July 2, 2014; ISBN 978-1616554491	The Strain — Book Two: The Fall; April 22, 2015; ISBN 978-1616558369
8	February 19, 2014	The Strain — Volume 4: The Fall; July 2, 2014; ISBN 978-1616554491	The Strain — Book Two: The Fall; April 22, 2015; ISBN 978-1616558369
9	March 19, 2014	The Strain — Volume 4: The Fall; July 2, 2014; ISBN 978-1616554491	The Strain — Book Two: The Fall; April 22, 2015; ISBN 978-1616558369

=== Television series ===
Executive producer and showrunner Carlton Cuse adapted the novel into the 13-episode second season of the eponymous television series from FX, which ran from July 13, 2014 to October 5, 2014.
