= The Strain (TV series) =

American TV show

- Title card from seasons 1–2
- Genre: Vampire; Horror; Drama
- Created by: Guillermo del Toro; Chuck Hogan
- Based on: The Strain by: Guillermo del Toro; Chuck Hogan
- Showrunner: Carlton Cuse
- Starring: Corey Stoll; David Bradley; Mía Maestro; Kevin Durand; Jonathan Hyde; Richard Sammel; Sean Astin; Jack Kesy; Natalie Brown; Miguel Gomez; Ben Hyland; Max Charles; Ruta Gedmintas; Rupert Penry-Jones; Samantha Mathis; Joaquín Cosío
- Voices of: Robin Atkin Downes
- Composer: Ramin Djawadi
- Country of origin: United States
- Original language: English
- No. of seasons: 4
- No. of episodes: 46 (list of episodes)

Production
- Executive producers: Guillermo del Toro; Carlton Cuse; Chuck Hogan; Gary Ungar; J. Miles Dale; David Weddle; Bradley Thompson; Regina Corrado
- Producers: Ra'uf Glasgow; Gennifer Hutchison
- Production locations: Toronto, Ontario
- Cinematography: Checco Verese; Gabriel Beristain; Miroslaw Baszak
- Editors: Kathryn Himoff; Christopher Nelson; Sarah Boyd
- Running time: 39–70 minutes
- Production companies: Double Dare You; Cuse Productions (Note: Credited as Carlton Cuse Productions for first two seasons); FXP (Note: Credited as FX Productions for first two seasons)

Original release
- Network: FX
- Release: July 13, 2014 – September 17, 2017

The Strain is an American horror drama television series that aired on FX from July 13, 2014, to September 17, 2017. It was created by Guillermo del Toro and Chuck Hogan, based on their novel trilogy of the same name. Carlton Cuse served as executive producer and showrunner. Del Toro and Hogan wrote the pilot episode, "Night Zero", which del Toro directed. A thirteen-episode first season was ordered on November 19, 2013. The pilot episode premiered at the ATX Television Festival in Austin, Texas, in early June 2014.

On August 6, 2014, FX renewed The Strain for a 13-episode second season which premiered on July 12, 2015. On August 7, 2015, FX renewed The Strain for a 10-episode third season which premiered on August 28, 2016. FX renewed the series for a fourth and final season on September 27, 2016, which premiered on July 16, 2017. During the course of the series, 46 episodes of The Strain aired over four seasons.

The show centers around Dr. Ephraim Goodweather, the head of the CDC's New York-based Canary Project, who is called upon to investigate an airplane landing wherein everyone aboard is dead. What his team discovers is a viral outbreak that has similarities to an ancient strain of vampirism. The virus begins to spread and Goodweather works with his team and a group of the city's residents to wage a war to save humanity. As the series progresses, Goodweather finds new allies as they discover a dark underworld, political corruption, and a sinister plot for dominion over life.

== Cast and characters ==
=== Main cast ===
- Corey Stoll as Dr. Ephraim "Eph" Goodweather, the head of the CDC Canary Team in New York City.
- David Bradley as Professor Abraham Setrakian, a Holocaust survivor turned New York pawnbroker. He is of Armenian descent. Jim Watson portrays a young Setrakian in flashbacks.
- Mía Maestro as Dr. Nora Martinez, a member of the CDC Canary Team and Eph's closest ally (seasons 1–2).
- Kevin Durand as Vasiliy Fet, a once-solitary rat exterminator of Ukrainian descent, who is caught up in the fight for humanity.
- Jonathan Hyde as Eldritch Palmer/The Master, an elderly, disabled billionaire driven to obtain immortality. Charlie Gallant portrays a young Palmer in flashbacks.
- Richard Sammel as Thomas Eichhorst, an undead vampire acolyte of the Master who has a 70-year history with Setrakian. In his former life, he was a Nazi commander at the Treblinka extermination camp in German-occupied Poland.
- Sean Astin as Jim Kent, a CDC administrator who works with Eph and Nora (season 1, guest season 2).
- Jack Kesy as Gabriel Bolivar/The Master, a philandering rock star with an appetite for recreational drugs and is one of the Master's vampire acolytes before becoming the Master's host body (seasons 1–2, recurring season 3).
- Natalie Brown as Kelly Goodweather, Eph's estranged wife (seasons 1–3, recurring season 4).
- Miguel Gomez as Augustin "Gus" Elizalde, a gang member who just got out of juvenile prison.
- Ben Hyland (season 1) and Max Charles (seasons 2–4) as Zach Goodweather, the son of Ephraim and Kelly.
- Robin Atkin Downes as the voice of the Master, one of the seven Ancient vampires and the series' central antagonist.
- Ruta Gedmintas as Dutch Velders, an internet hacker hired by Palmer, who turns against the company when she realizes what she has done (recurring season 1, main seasons 2–4).
- Rupert Penry-Jones as Mr. Quinlan, a half-vampire with a vendetta against the Master (seasons 2–4).
- Samantha Mathis as Justine Feraldo, a tenacious New York City councilwoman for Staten Island (recurring season 2, main season 3).
- Joaquín Cosío as Angel Guzman Hurtado, a retired wrestler once known as "The Silver Angel" (recurring season 2, main season 3).

=== Recurring cast ===
- Cas Anvar as Sanjay Desai, a Stoneheart employee and subordinate of Eichhorst (seasons 3–4).
- Pedro Miguel Arce as Felix, Gus's friend (season 1).
- Adriana Barraza as Guadalupe Elizalde, Gus and Crispin's mother (seasons 1–3).
- Brenda Bazinet as Pauline McGeever, a vampire victim experimented on by Eph and Nora (season 2).
- Nigel Bennett as Dr. Werner Dreverhaven, a former Nazi physician turned vampire (seasons 2–3).
- Anne Betancourt as Mariela Martinez, Nora's mother who has dementia (season 1).
- Lizzie Brocheré as Coco Marchand, Palmer's new personal assistant (season 2).
- Inga Cadranel as Diane, a Queens native and Kelly's best friend (season 1).
- Ron Canada as George Lyle, the Mayor of New York City (season 2).
- Francis Capra as Crispin Elizalde, Gus's con artist brother (season 1).
- K. C. Collins as Captain Daniel Roman, a U.S. Air Force officer who formerly served at a nuclear missile silo (season 4).
- Nicola Correia-Damude as Nikki Taylor, a roommate and once girlfriend of Dutch Velders (seasons 1–2).
- Roger Cross as Reggie Fitzwilliam, Palmer's caregiver and head of security (seasons 1–2).
- Miranda Edwards as Eve, a human agent working with Quinlan and The Ancients (season 2).
- Kevin Hanchard as Curtis Fitzwilliam, a firefighter and Reggie's brother (season 2).
- Jamie Hector as Alonso Creem, an arms dealer and gang leader (seasons 1–2, 4).
- Leslie Hope as Joan Luss, an attorney and one of the plane's surviving passengers (season 1).
- Jocelyn Hudon as Abby, a maid who befriends Zach (season 4).
- Doug Jones as one of the Ancients, the seven original vampires. Jones also portrays the Master's previous host before Jusef in a flashback (seasons 1–3).
- Daniel Kash as Dr. Everett Barnes, the director of the CDC and later Secretary for Health and Human Services (seasons 1–2).
- Parveen Kaur as Aanya Gupta, a waitress and the daughter of the owners of the Tandoori Palace (season 2).
- Tom Kemp as Cardinal McNamara, a Catholic cardinal who is selling an item of interest to both Setrakian and Palmer (season 2).
- Regina King as Ruby Wain, Bolivar's intelligent and accomplished manager (season 1).
- Ron Lea as Harrison McGeever, a vampire victim experimented on by Eph and Nora (season 2).
- Robert Maillet as Jusef Sardu, a 19th-century Polish noble who was the Master's host body until he was gravely injured (seasons 1–2, 4).
- Stephen McHattie as Vaun, leader of a band of undead hunters sent to destroy the vampire outbreak (seasons 1–2).
- Melanie Merkosky as Sylvia Kent, Jim Kent's cancer-stricken wife (season 1).
- Rhona Mitra as Charlotte, a woman who joins Fet and Quinlan in their search for weapons to destroy the Master (season 4).
- Drew Nelson as Matt Sayles, Kelly Goodweather's live-in boyfriend (season 1).
- Paulino Nunes as Captain Frank Kowalski, an NYPD officer working with Justine Feraldo (season 2–3).
- America Olivo as Captain Kate Rogers, the commander of a squad of NYPD combatants (season 3).
- Angel Parker as Alex Green, the leader of a group of anti-strigoi resistance fighters (season 4).
- Jonathan Potts as Captain Doyle Redfern, pilot of the flight and one of the outbreak's few survivors (season 1).
- Michael Reventar as Raul, Gus's cousin (season 4).
- Kim Roberts as Neeva, Joan Luss' nanny and housekeeper (season 1).
- Nikolai Witschl as Ansel Barbour, one of the plane's surviving passengers (season 1).
- Alex Paxton-Beesley as Ann-Marie Barbour wife of Ansel Barbour (season 1).

== Production ==
=== Development ===
Promotional poster which was withdrawn from circulation after a number of complaints.

In 2006, del Toro pitched The Strain as a television series, but negotiations broke down when the network president at Fox Broadcasting Company asked him to make it a comedy. An agent suggested expanding the concept as a novel series instead. Del Toro asked Chuck Hogan to co-write the series, explaining: "I've written short stories in Spanish and English. I've written screenplays. But I'm not good at forensic novels. I'm not good at hazmat language and that CSI-style precision. When Stoker wrote Dracula, it was very modern, a CSI sort of novel. I wanted to give The Strain a procedural feel, where everything seems real." Hogan agreed after reading a page and a half of del Toro's 12-page project outline; the duo collaborated for the first year on a handshake, with no contract or publishing deal in place. The first installment, The Strain, was released in 2009. It was followed by 2010's The Fall and 2011's The Night Eternal.

After the first book's publication, studios and networks began making offers for the film and television adaptation rights, but del Toro and Hogan declined, not wanting a screen version to influence the way they were writing the books. After the third book's publication, the authors talked with every cable network that had expressed interest. FX was deemed most suitable because they wanted to follow the books closely and liked the idea of The Strain as a close-ended series consisting of three to five seasons. Del Toro stated that the first two novels can be covered by one season each, while The Night Eternal may be split into two or three seasons. The author is also open to creative detours that may develop as the series goes on, possibly incorporating material cut from the books. Del Toro intends to direct as many episodes as his busy schedule allows. Before the series order was announced, FX gave the writing team the go-ahead to script another ten episodes, which del Toro rewrote. FX president John Landgraf has stated that the series will consist of "39–65 episodes, no less, no more", adding "What if a television show could be just the length that is optimal for that story?"

Regarding the style of the show's production, del Toro stated: "Basically I'm trying to do what I do in my movies which is to show it as a reality, but as a reality that is stylized. It's not like CSI or The Wire, it's real but it feels a little stylized. But the way the camera work will be is very realistic. We want to keep the camera very documentary even if the look of the show is not. The look of the show is very designed. The style of the camera and the storytelling will be very loose. It will evolve from that feel of reality, and little by little we want to evolve into more stylish, horror feel that requires smoother camera moves, more suspense and atmosphere-driven moments so it will be a mixture. I don't think that mixture has been seen a lot on TV."

FX ordered a thirteen-episode first season for the series on November 19, 2013, and announced that the series would premiere in July 2014. In August 2015, del Toro and Cuse announced a five-season plan for the series after the third season renewal, Cuse said, "From the very beginning, we had really talked about the first book being the first season, the second book being the next two seasons and the third book the last two seasons". He also said that beyond the first and second seasons, which are 13 episodes each, the remaining seasons were planned to each consist of 10 episodes. However, in September 2016, FX announced the series' fourth season would be its last. Cuse stated, "After finishing the writing on season three, Guillermo, Chuck and I looked at our remaining story and felt the best version could be told in one more season."

=== Casting ===
Del Toro and Cuse cast the series together. Stoll was cast as Eph Goodweather based on his performance in Midnight in Paris. John Hurt played Abraham Setrakian in the original version of the pilot, but later dropped out. The role was recast with David Bradley and his scenes were reshot with Bradley. Del Toro had previously expressed interest in casting Roy Dotrice, who played Setrakian in several live-action advertisements for the first novel. Kevin Durand, who appeared in Cuse's previous show Lost, was cast as Vasiliy Fet, although the character was originally created with regular del Toro collaborator Ron Perlman in mind. Lauren Lee Smith was originally cast as Kelly Goodweather, but was ultimately replaced by Natalie Brown. Del Toro wanted Doug Jones for a major role, but the actor had to decline because of scheduling conflicts; he later played the Ancient and the Master's previous incarnation. Sean Astin was cast as Jim Kent because del Toro and Cuse "thought it would be funny to have the most famous sidekick of all times be a betrayer". For the second season, Max Charles replaced Ben Hyland in the series regular role of Zach Goodweather.

=== Filming ===
The pilot episode began principal photography on September 17, 2013, in Toronto, Ontario, Canada. Shooting of the pilot was finished on October 31, 2013. FX ordered 13 episodes. Season one was expected to film from November 25, 2013, to April 30, 2014. A full writing staff was hired to script subsequent episodes. FX reportedly committed $500,000 to creature creation. Twelve swords used in the series were provided by Missoula, Montana-based bladesmith company Zombie Tools. Production began for the second season in Toronto in November 2014.

=== Music ===
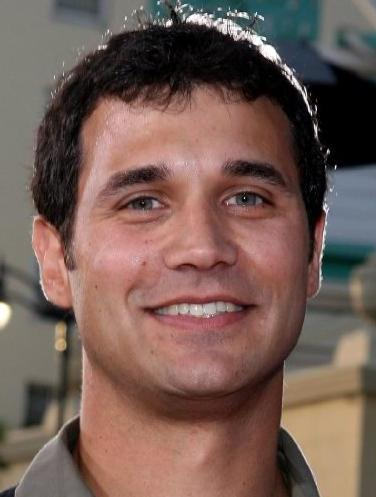
Ramin Djawadi is the composer of The Strain score.

The music was composed by Ramin Djawadi, who previously scored del Toro's 2013 film Pacific Rim.

=== Marketing ===
The original key art for the series prominently featured a worm, a vector of the vampiric virus, burrowing through a person's eye. Following complaints from members of the public, FX announced that they would replace the artwork on several of their billboards.

== Episodes ==
Season	Episodes	Originally released	
Season	Episodes	First released	Last released
1	13	July 13, 2014	October 5, 2014
2	13	July 12, 2015	October 4, 2015
3	10	August 28, 2016	October 30, 2016
4	10	July 16, 2017	September 17, 2017

Additionally, a 10-part webisode series titled The Strain: Under Siege aired alongside the third season. It was also released on the DVD releases of the third season and the complete series.

== Reception ==
The first season received generally positive reviews from critics and has a Metacritic rating of 72 out of 100 based on 38 reviews. On review aggregator Rotten Tomatoes, the first season holds an 84% rating with an average score of 7.5 out of 10 based on 64 reviews. Its critics consensus states, "The Strain makes the most of its familiar themes through an effective mix of supernatural thrills and B-movie gore – though it may not appeal to everyone".

The second season received generally positive reviews and has a Metacritic rating of 66 out of 100 based on 8 reviews. On Rotten Tomatoes, the season has a rating of 78% with an average score of 7 out of 10 based on 23 reviews. Its critics consensus states, "The Strain's gory action helps compensate for an unfocused narrative, while the show's political and philosophical subtext add necessary heft for adult viewers."

The third season received mixed to positive reviews and has a Metacritic rating of 62 out of 100 based on 5 reviews. On Rotten Tomatoes, the season has a rating of 55% with an average score of 5.8 out of 10 based on 11 reviews. Its critics consensus states, "Content with mediocrity, The Strain suffers under the weight of a stagnant story, scraping by on the pedigree of its style and visual effects."

The fourth season received generally positive reviews. On Rotten Tomatoes, the season has a rating of 100% with an average score of 7.4 out of 10 based on 13 reviews. Its critics consensus states, "The Strain concludes on a high note with a climactic season that will remind viewers of the series' initial bite."

=== Awards and nominations ===
Year	Award	Category	Nominee	Result	Ref.
2014	Critics Choice Television Awards	Most Exciting New Series	The Strain	Won	
2014	Satellite Awards	Best Genre Television Series	The Strain	Nominated	
2015	Saturn Awards	Best Syndicated/Cable Television Series	The Strain	Nominated	
2015	Saturn Awards	Best Supporting Actor in a Television Series	David Bradley	Nominated	
2015	Saturn Awards	Best Supporting Actor in a Television Series	Richard Sammel	Nominated	
2015	Fangoria Chainsaw Awards	Best TV Supporting Actor	David Bradley	Nominated	
2015	Fangoria Chainsaw Awards	Best TV Makeup/Creature FX	Steve Newburn, Sean Sansom	Nominated	
2015	Golden Reel Awards	Best Sound Editing – Short Form Dialogue and ADR in Television	Nelson Ferreira, Jill Purdy (for "The Box")	Nominated	
2016	Canadian Society of Cinematographers Awards	TV series Cinematography	Colin Hoult (for "By Any Means")	Nominated	
2016	Saturn Awards	Best Horror Television Series	The Strain	Nominated	
2016	Saturn Awards	Best Performance by a Younger Actor in a Television Series	Max Charles	Nominated	
2016	Directors Guild of Canada Awards	Best Sound Editing – Television Series	John Loranger, Dan Sexton, Adam Stein, Nathan Robitaille, Jill Purdy, Richard Calistan, Joe Mancuso, Craig MacLellan (for "Night Train")	Nominated	
2016	Fangoria Chainsaw Awards	Best TV Makeup/Creature FX	Steve Newburn, Sean Sansom	Nominated	
2016	Golden Maple Awards	Best Actress in a TV Series Broadcast in the US	Natalie Brown	Won	
2016	Visual Effects Society Awards	Outstanding Visual Effects in a Photoreal Episode	Dennis Berardi, Luke Groves, Matt Glover, Trey Harrell, Warren Appleby (for "Identity")	Nominated	
2017	Saturn Awards	Best Performance by a Younger Actor in a Television Series	Max Charles	Nominated	
2018	Saturn Awards	Best Horror Television Series	The Strain	Nominated	
2018	Saturn Awards	Best Performance by a Younger Actor in a Television Series	Max Charles	Nominated	

== See also ==
- List of vampire television series
