= Chuck Hogan =

American novelist

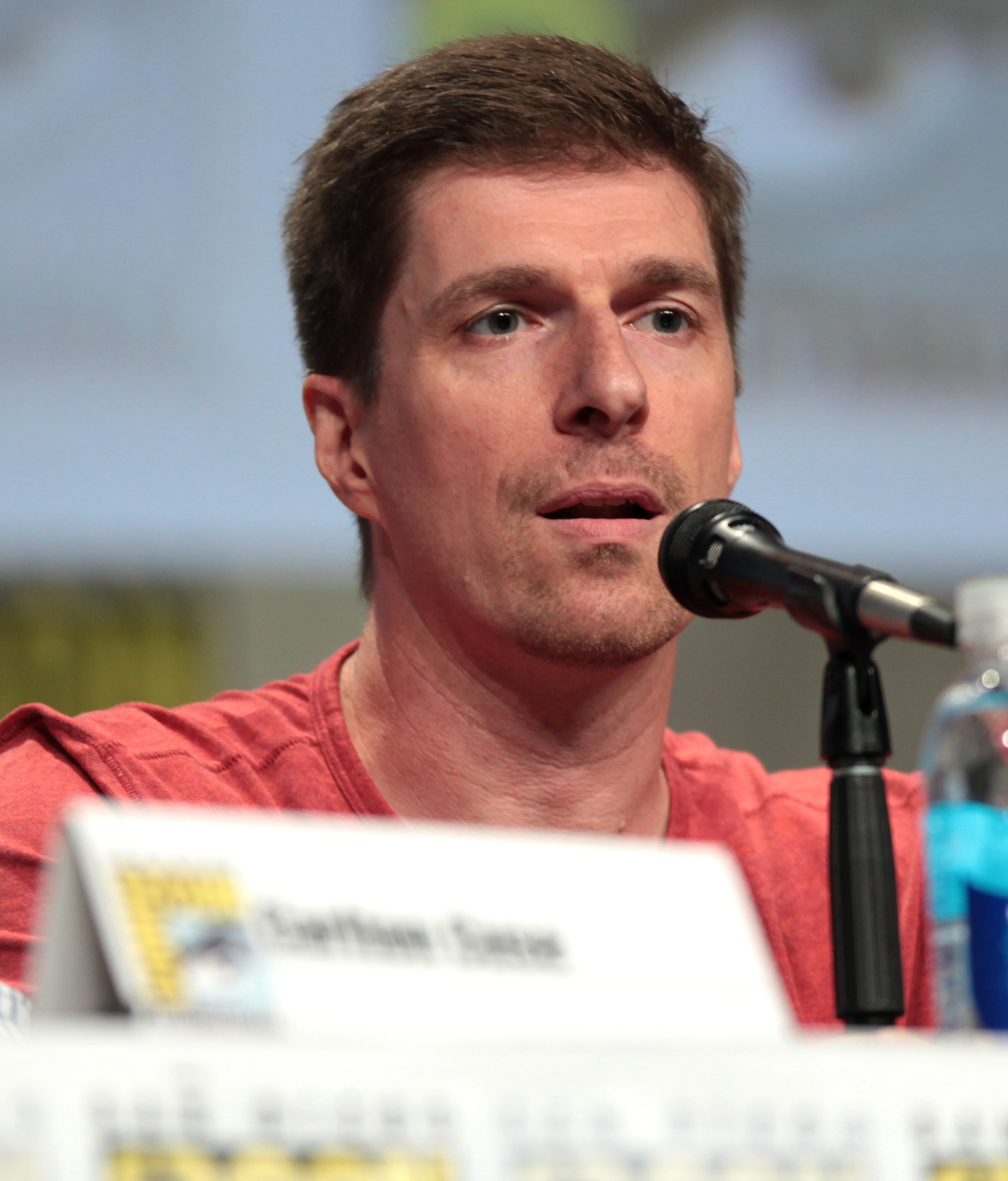
- Hogan in July 2014
- Born: Charles Patrick Hogan; Boston, Massachusetts, U.S.
- Education: Canton High School; Boston College
- Occupations: Novelist; screenwriter; producer
- Children: 4
- Writing career
- Genres: Crime fiction, horror
- Notable works: The Strain; The Standoff; Prince of Thieves; Devils in Exile

Charles Patrick "Chuck" Hogan is an American novelist, screenwriter, and television producer. He is best known as the author of Prince of Thieves, and as the co-author of The Strain trilogy with Guillermo del Toro. Del Toro and Hogan created the television series The Strain (2014–2017), adapted from their trilogy of vampire novels.

Hogan also wrote the crime novels The Standoff (1995), The Blood Artists (1998), The Killing Moon (2007), and The Devils In Exile (2010). He wrote the screenplay for the war film 13 Hours: The Secret Soldiers of Benghazi (2016).

Prince of Thieves (2004) won the 2005 Hammett Prize. Noted author Stephen King ranked it as one of the ten best novels of the year.

It was adapted as The Town (2010), a film directed by and starring Ben Affleck, Rebecca Hall, and Jon Hamm. It was nominated for an Academy Award.

== Bibliography ==
- The Standoff (1995)
- The Blood Artists (1998)
- Prince of Thieves (2004)
- The Killing Moon (2007)
- The Devils In Exile (2010)
- The Hollow Ones (with Guillermo del Toro) (2020)
- Gangland (2022)
- The Boy in the Iron Box (with Guillermo del Toro) (2024) (Note: This serialized novella consists of six books: "Falling Down", "The Pit and the Box", "The Hunted", "Risen", "Siege", and "Encounter".)
- The Carpool Detectives (2025)

=== The Strain trilogy ===
- The Strain (with Guillermo del Toro) (2009)
- The Fall (with Guillermo del Toro) (2010)
- The Night Eternal (with Guillermo del Toro) (2011)

== Filmography ==
Year	Title	Credited as		Notes	Ref.
Year	Title	Writer	Executive producer	Notes	Ref.
2014–2017	The Strain	Yes	Yes	Co-creator, television series based on his trilogy The Strain; writer (11 episodes)	
2016	13 Hours: The Secret Soldiers of Benghazi	Yes		Based on Mitchell Zuckoff's book 13 Hours	
