= Guillermo del Toro filmography =

Performances by Mexican filmmaker

The following is the complete filmography of Mexican filmmaker and author Guillermo del Toro.

== Film ==
Feature film

Year	Title				
Year	Title	Director	Writer	Producer	Notes
1992	Cronos	Yes	Yes	No	
1997	Mimic	Yes	Yes	No	
2001	The Devil's Backbone	Yes	Yes	Executive	Original title: El espinazo del diablo
2002	Blade II	Yes	No	No	
2004	Hellboy	Yes	Yes	No	
2006	Pan's Labyrinth	Yes	Yes	Yes	Original title: El laberinto del fauno
2008	Hellboy II: The Golden Army	Yes	Yes	No	
2013	Pacific Rim	Yes	Yes	Yes	
2015	Crimson Peak	Yes	Yes	Yes	
2017	The Shape of Water	Yes	Yes	Yes	
2021	Nightmare Alley	Yes	Yes	Yes	
2022	Pinocchio	Yes	Yes	Yes	Co-directed with Mark Gustafson
2025	Frankenstein	Yes	Yes	Yes	

Writer and/or producer only

Year	Title	Writer	Producer
1998	Un embrujo	No	Yes
2004	Crónicas	No	Yes
2008	Insignificant Things	No	Yes
2008	Rudo y Cursi	No	Yes
2009	Rabia	No	Yes
2010	Julia's Eyes	No	Yes
2010	Don't Be Afraid of the Dark	Yes	Yes
2012	The Hobbit: An Unexpected Journey	Yes	No
2013	The Hobbit: The Desolation of Smaug	Yes	No
2014	The Book of Life	No	Yes
2014	The Hobbit: The Battle of the Five Armies	Yes	No
2018	Pacific Rim Uprising	No	Yes
2019	Scary Stories to Tell in the Dark	Story	Yes
2020	The Witches	Yes	Yes
2021	Trollhunters: Rise of the Titans	Yes	Yes
2021	Antlers	No	Yes
TBA	The Boy in the Iron Box	No	Yes

Executive producer only

- Dona Herlinda and Her Son (1985)
- The Orphanage (2007)
- While She Was Out (2008)
- Splice (2009)
- Puss in Boots (2011)
- Rise of the Guardians (2012)
- Mama (2013)
- Kung Fu Panda 3 (2016)

Short film

Year	Title	Director	Writer	Producer
1985	Doña Lupe	Yes	Yes	Executive
1987	Geometría	Yes	Yes	Yes
2012	The Captured Bird	No	No	Executive

== Television ==
Year	Title	Director	Writer	Executive Producer	Creator	Notes
1986–1989	La hora marcada	Yes	Yes	No	No	Wrote and directed episodes "Hamburguesas", "Caminos de ayer", "Con todo para llevar" and "Invasión"; Directed episode "Les gourmets"
2013	The Simpsons	Yes	No	No	No	Opening sequence of episode "Treehouse of Horror XXIV"
2014–2017	The Strain	Yes	Yes	Yes	Yes	Wrote and directed episode "Night Zero"; Directed prologue of episode "BK, NY"; Directed Luchador film of episode "The Silver Angel"
2016–2018	Trollhunters: Tales of Arcadia	Yes	Yes	Yes	Yes	Wrote and directed episodes "Becoming: Part 1 & 2"; Directed episodes "The Eternal Knight: Part 1 & 2"
2018–2019	3Below: Tales of Arcadia	Yes	Yes	Yes	Yes	Wrote and directed episodes "Terra Incognita: Part 1 & 2"
2019	Carnival Row	No	Uncredited	No	No	Original story
2020	Wizards: Tales of Arcadia	No	Yes	Yes	Yes	Wrote episodes "Spellbound" and "History in the Making"
2022	Guillermo del Toro's; Cabinet of Curiosities	No	Yes	Yes	Yes	Also showrunner Wrote episode "Lot 36"; Wrote story of episode "The Murmuring"

== Video games ==
Year	Title	Director	Producer	Writer	Other	Notes
2008	Hellboy: The Science of Evil	No	No	Yes	Yes	Voice over director
2014	P.T.	Yes	No	No	No	
2019	Death Stranding	No	No	No	Yes	Likeness for Deadman
2020	Trollhunters: Defenders of Arcadia	No	Yes	Yes	No	
2025	Death Stranding 2: On the Beach	No	No	No	Yes	Likeness for Deadman

== Acting roles ==
Film

Year	Title	Role	Notes
1992	Cronos	Man Walking Dog	Uncredited cameo
2000	Bullfighter	Bullboy #2	
2001	Planet of the Apes	General Thade	Voice, Latin American dub
2004	Hellboy	Guy Dressed as Dragon	Uncredited cameo
2007	Diary of the Dead	Newsreader (voice)	Uncredited cameo
2008	Hellboy II: The Golden Army	Creatures (voices)	Uncredited
2008	Quantum of Solace	Additional voices	
2011	Don't Be Afraid of the Dark	Creatures (voices)	
2011	Don't Be Afraid of the Dark	Passenger on the plane behind Sally	Uncredited cameo
2011	Puss in Boots	Moustache Man / Comandante (voices)	
2014	The Book of Life	Land of the Remembered Captain's Wife (voice)	
2015	Extraordinary Tales	The Pit and the Pendulum (voice)	Narrator

Television

Year	Title	Role	Notes
2012	El Santos vs. La Tetona Mendoza	Gamborimbo Ponx (voice)	
2012, 2016, 2026	It's Always Sunny in Philadelphia	Pappy McPoyle	3 episodes
2016–2018	Trollhunters	Señor Muelas (voice)	5 episodes
2018	Mickey and the Roadster Racers	Mr. Talbot (voice)	Episode: "Goof Mansion"
2019	The Simpsons	Himself (voice)	Episode: "101 Mitigations"
2019	3Below	Dr. Muelas (voice)	2 episodes
2022	Guillermo del Toro's Cabinet of Curiosities	Himself	Series host
2023	Barry	Toro	Episode: "you're charming"

== Documentary appearances ==
Year	Title
2008	Lovecraft: Fear of the Unknown
2011	Comic-Con Episode IV: A Fan's Hope
2011	Ray Harryhausen: Special Effects Titan
2013	Drew: The Man Behind the Poster
2013	Necessary Evil: Super-Villains of DC Comics
2017	78/52
2020	Clapboard Jungle
2021	Boris Karloff: The Man Behind the Monster
2022	Mike Mignola: Drawing Monsters
2023	Dario Argento Panico
2025	Jaws @ 50: The Definitive Inside Story

== Other works ==
Year	Title	
Year	Title	Notes
1987	Obdulia	First assistant director
1989	Love Lies (Mentiras piadosas)	Special makeup effects artist
1989	Goitia, un dios para sí mismo	Special makeup effects artist
1990	Morir en el golfo	Special makeup effect artist and storyboard artist
1991	Cabeza de Vaca	Special makeup effect artist
1991	Bandidos	Special makeup effect artist
1992	Mi querido Tom Mix	Special makeup effect artist
1993	Dollar Mambo	Special makeup effect artist
1995	Algunas nubes	Special makeup effect artist
2006	Hellboy: Sword of Storms	Creative producer
2007	Hellboy: Blood and Iron	Creative producer
2007	Hellboy: Iron Shoes	Short film Creative producer
2010	Biutiful	Associate producer
2010	Megamind	Creative consultant
2011	Kung Fu Panda 2	Creative consultant
2011	Cowboys & Aliens	Creative consultant (uncredited)
2014	Edge of Tomorrow	Special visual consultant
2014	How to Train Your Dragon 2	"Thank you" credit
2023	Haunted Mansion	Additional literary material
2023	The Caine Mutiny Court-Martial	Stand-by director
2025	I Am Frankelda	"Thank you" credit
2025	Wake Up Dead Man	Special thanks
2026	The Mandalorian and Grogu	Creative consultant

== See also ==
- Guillermo del Toro's unrealized projects
