= Guillermo del Toro's unrealized projects =

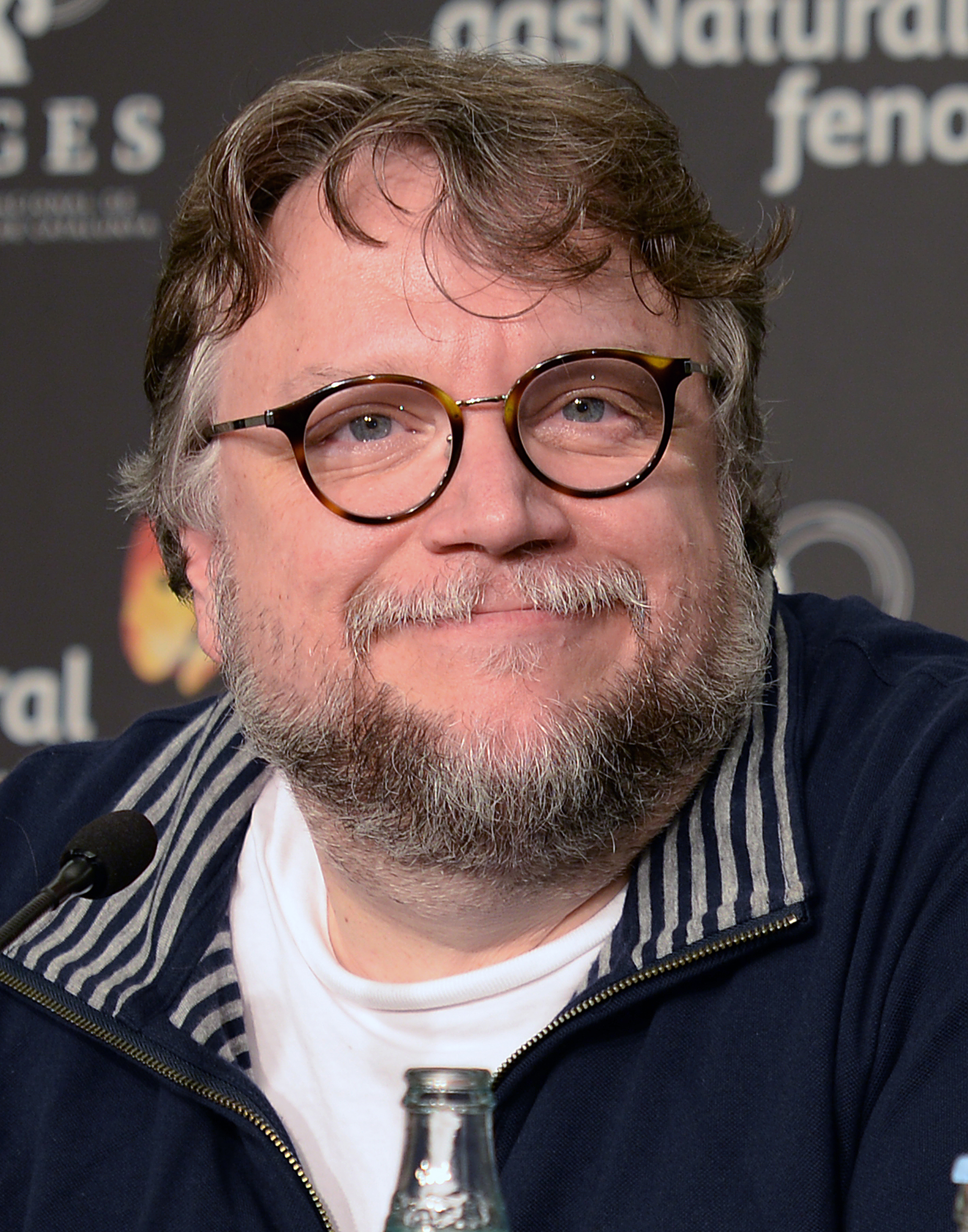
Del Toro at the Sitges Film Festival in 2017

During his decades-long career, Mexican filmmaker and author Guillermo del Toro has worked on a number of projects that never progressed beyond the pre-production stage. Some of these projects fell into development hell and are presumably canceled, while some were taken over and completed by other filmmakers.

== 1990s ==
=== Omnivore ===
Del Toro spent three years preparing to direct his first feature—a claymation sci-fi film titled Omnivore—in the early 1990s. The premise focused on the plight of a lizard-man born in a savage land where everything tries to eat everything else. Del Toro was inspired by Mexican stop-motion sculptor Marcel Delgado to create a different kind of monster film, and had written the story entirely in the Uto-Aztecan language Nahuatl. "It was a very late teens, early twenties, underground comix-type of story," del Toro said of the project in 2023. "Very pop, heavy metal." With the help of his brother and then-girlfriend, 120 puppets were fabricated in clay, and sets were built, but were left unattended and then vandalized. "They had destroyed every puppet, they had pooped and peed on the floor. And I turned around and I said, 'I'm gonna do Cronos. I'm gonna do a live action movie'." The only surviving materials from Omnivore were del Toro's storyboards, which were lost over time following several moves.

=== Meat Market: A Love Story ===
Meat Market, an original screenplay by del Toro co-written with Ron Perlman, was described as "Hamlet in a meat market, by the way of Phantom of the Opera". Del Toro wanted Perlman to star in the lead role, but lost interest in pursuing the project when he believed he had become too old to play the part.

=== Silver ===
Following Cronos, in the early 1990s, del Toro began writing a film called Silver, about a Mexican luchador wrestler who discovers that all politicians are vampires. In 2006, he stated that he had been wanting to shoot a new film in Mexico again but that he was "stuck on page 60" of the screenplay for Silver. In 2014, del Toro voiced his intentions to film a "small" low-budget film in black-and-white before beginning production on Pacific Rim 2, which he was attached to direct at the time. He spoke of casting John Hurt in an undisclosed role, as well as a lesser-known actress for the female lead. In 2015, this project was revealed to be Silver, which he was then said to be making following Crimson Peak instead of The Shape of Water.

=== Mephisto's Bridge ===
Del Toro wrote an adaptation of Christopher Fowler's novel Spanky entitled Mephisto's Bridge, about a billboard designer who sells his soul to the devil. The first draft of the script was completed in 1994 and the film nearly went into production in the mid-2000s, but it did not go beyond pre-production. In 2001, del Toro called the screenplay a metaphor for his experiences in Hollywood. In 2008, he revealed that Fowler had awarded the rights to another production company, so the project was officially dead.

=== At the Mountains of Madness ===
As early as 1993, del Toro had begun sketching images for a film adaptation of H. P. Lovecraft's At the Mountains of Madness; completing a first draft of a screenplay five years later. The project was deemed too daunting at the time as digital effects were not complex enough to render the shape-shifting creatures radically enough. By 2003, he was said to be working on co-writing the adaptation with Matthew Robbins. It was originally in development at DreamWorks Pictures under producers Susan Montford and Don Murphy, but would be cancelled. In 2006, del Toro took it to Warner Bros. but had trouble getting financing. At this stage, William Stout had completed preliminary art designs and Ron Perlman was rumored to play the role of Larson. In 2007, the project was acquired by Universal Pictures when del Toro signed a first-look deal there and when Hellboy II: The Golden Army was green lit. Plans were then put on hold when del Toro accepted the offer to co-write and direct two installments of J. R. R. Tolkien's The Hobbit, which he ultimately dropped out of. In July 2010, it was officially announced that he would direct At the Mountains of Madness as a 3D film for Universal, with James Cameron producing. Del Toro confirmed that he wanted Tom Cruise for the lead, and that the film would begin production as early as May 2011 and start filming in June. Earlier that same year, del Toro had also asked S. T. Joshi if he wanted to be a consultant once the film got into production. However, in March 2011, it was announced that Universal refused to greenlight the project over concerns of the $150 million budget and del Toro's insistence that it be released with an R rating rather than PG-13. In 2013, del Toro stated in an interview that he would try one more time to get the picture made, with Cruise still attached. In 2014, del Toro expressed leniency toward a PG-13 rating, saying that there was a possibility that the film would be made through Legendary Pictures (who produced his film Pacific Rim). Ever since its cancellation, del Toro has promised he would release all of the extensive pre-production artwork which was prepared for the film and never used. "We did over 300 pieces of art," he said in 2017. "We did storyboards, we did models... we had a whole presentation. You will cry, you will go, 'Why?' " In December 2021, del Toro revealed that At the Mountains of Madness was pitched to Netflix, after signing a multi-year deal with the streaming service in 2020. The filmmaker stated: "Take a wild guess which were the first projects I presented, you know? I went through the cupboard and found Montecristo and Mountains of Madness. Those were a couple of the ones I presented first." Del Toro further iterated that he intended to rewrite the script and make it a smaller, weirder and more esoteric version in respect to the scenes that he had left out before. Del Toro cast doubt if Tom Cruise would star in the project in the foreseeable future due to his age. In 2025, del Toro affirmed that the film was still on his bucket list, but that "it's too big, too crazy, too R-rated" and not what he wanted to make right then.

=== The Left Hand of Darkness ===
In 1994, del Toro began writing an adaptation of Alexandre Dumas's The Count of Monte Cristo with L. M. Kit Carson and Matthew Robbins, titled Montecristo, later renamed The Left Hand of Darkness. His version was set in Mexico and was called a "steampunk gothic western". According to del Toro, he met with Nicolas Cage to play the lead role. The screenplay was rewritten by del Toro at around the time his father was kidnapped and held for ransom, and he has since described it as having "a lot of rage." In 2000, the project was presumably moving forward with American Zoetrope producing, but it was put aside in favor of The Devil's Backbone and Blade II. In 2002, del Toro provided further details on the film:

"It's a very gothic adaptation of the book. I've always thought that Dumas wanted to evoke the spirit of the One Thousand and One Nights, his fascination for the Orient. Each adaptation was an adventure film or a classic movie without any invention, exoticism. So I wondered what would give this book adapted as a western [...] In the book, the Count is often mentioned as a 'pirate', a 'vampire', a 'thief'. He's very dark. And in my adaptation, the Count only goes out at nights. He's very close to a Dracula coming from a western, all dressed in black, red and gold. He has a mechanical arm that allows him to draw his gun faster than every one. [...] Monte Cristo will be a very catholic movie. [...] I've been trying to make this project for 10 years now. I always have these images with me. But the movie is so huge in my mind that I must find the perfect conditions to make it."

He also described the film as being technically challenging in a 2008 interview with Den of Geek:

"I think that's a movie that still bugs me a little bit. I mean, when you ask me if I'm scared of The Hobbit, I'm not, I'm more scared of Left Hand of Darkness, because it's a movie that I'm very, very proud of the screenplay, but it requires a set of tools that are a little daunting. It's sort of like a David Lean, Sergio Leone epic western. Very much full of magic. And it's the only movie without any creatures."

In 2013, del Toro said that it was one of the projects he would still love to do and that Legendary Pictures was very close to financing it, but were torn between making Crimson Peak instead, which was ultimately chosen in its favor. However, a 2026 IndieWire article indicated del Toro "has several projects on the burner" including "a rewrite of The Count of Monte Cristo as a gothic Western."

=== The List of Seven ===
Del Toro was attached to direct an adaptation of Mark Frost's 1993 novel The List of Seven. Frost himself wrote a draft of a screenplay before the project was cancelled. In 2003, del Toro joked that it had become a "tradition" to talk to Frost each year to plan another way of gathering financing for the project. "When we wrote it, Steampunk had not yet taken hold. Many movies have done stuff like it now, with varying degrees of success," del Toro explained. "But List of Seven remains as powerful today as it was when we adapted the novel."

=== Light Years ===
The impetus for del Toro's film Mimic originally began in the form of an unmade anthology film titled Light Years, which was to feature four short science fiction segments, "but with a different bent for each." The other directors were Bryan Singer, Danny Boyle and Gary Fleder. According to del Toro, the studio opted to abandon the project and morph his and Fleder's segments into features instead. "I initially said I don't think there is enough there for a feature," del Toro recalled. "I think it is a perfect short, but there's not enough there for two hours." Boyle was the only one able to film his segment, Alien Love Triangle, whereas Fleder's was later made as Imposter in 2001. Del Toro described Singer's as "very abstract, very philosophical".

=== The Sandkings ===
Around 1995, before directing Mimic, del Toro approached George R. R. Martin with the intent to make a film adaptation of his famous novelette Sandkings, but the project was quickly scrapped after the novel was adapted into the first episode of the television series The Outer Limits.

=== Superstitious ===
In 1997, it was reported that del Toro signed a deal to direct an adaptation of R. L. Stine's horror novel Superstitious for Dimension Films. He wrote a script, but the project remains unproduced.

=== Exorcist: Chapter 4 Verse I ===
In the late 1990s, between the releases of Mimic and The Devil's Backbone, del Toro pitched himself to direct a fourth installment in The Exorcist film series for Morgan Creek Entertainment. His version would have been titled Exorcist: Chapter 4 Verse I and would have seen Father Merrin brought in to investigate the murder of a priest by a possessed child in the Vatican during World War II. Del Toro later spoke of the project in a live interview in 2006:

"[The story] was very epic, setting up what followed. So I finished my take about The Exorcist and [the Morgan Creek executives] listened patiently and then said, 'That's fantastic, but there's only one thing. We want the movie but we don't want there to be an exorcism in it.' So I said, 'But it's called The Exorcist.' 'Yeah, but the last movie had an exorcism and it didn't make money.' That was the last meeting I took on that one. But that's sort of the Hollywood principle."

Instead, the prequels Exorcist: The Beginning and Dominion: Prequel to the Exorcist were made by directors Renny Harlin and Paul Schrader respectively, but were both critical and financial failures.

=== Domu: A Child's Dream ===
In 1999, del Toro was attached to write and direct an adaptation of Katsuhiro Otomo's Domu: A Child's Dream for Touchstone Pictures, with Don Murphy's Angry Films producing. In 2002, after the success of Blade II, del Toro said that he tried to make the film in the following years, but his efforts were hamstrung by international legalities.

"Goddamn it, we haven't even got the rights. We've been negotiating the rights for four years, which goes to prove Japanese lawyers are even more complex than American lawyers. The moment we have the rights I would go ahead and write it."

In 2006, Otomo revealed that there were problems with the producer and that he did not know what the current status of the film was, but stated, "I gave Del Toro the rights, though, so as far as I'm concerned, if it ever gets made, he is the one who will make it."

=== Midnight Delivery ===
Also in 1999, del Toro said he had first begun writing the story to Midnight Delivery. By 2011, del Toro was set to produce Midnight Delivery, with Brian Kirk directing for Universal Pictures. In July 2013, Kevin Costner was in talks to star in the film.

== 2000s ==
=== Really Scary ===
Sometime in the 2000s, del Toro was involved to direct a segment of an anthology horror film set up by John Landis, with directors Sam Raimi and Joe Dante also involved. Ironically, Landis would speak of the project in the unproduced documentary series Untold Horror:

"Our executive [at the studio] was caught in a major scandal and fired. All his movies went away."

Landis' papers, located at the Academy Film Archive, indicate the project's title as Really Scary.

=== An Honest Man ===
In November 2001, while promoting The Devil's Backbone, del Toro revealed that he was then working on a "small movie" called An Honest Man which he was writing for Federico Luppi to star. The storyline follows a meek office employee who murders all of his co-workers in order to preserve his reputation as a good accountant.

=== The Coffin ===
Soon after its publication, James Cameron optioned a screen adaptation of Phil Hester and Mike Huddleston's 2001 horror comic The Coffin. Cameron tapped del Toro to write and direct the film via Lightstorm Entertainment after he had finished shooting Blade II. In 2003, del Toro revealed that the project had not yet been written, but that Tim McCanlies had helped to "outline" it. Despite the eventual completion of a script, the project never came to pass, and both del Toro and Cameron would both move onto other projects.

=== Creature from the Black Lagoon remake ===
In August 2002, del Toro, a fan of the original Creature from the Black Lagoon, was in talks with Universal to direct a remake. He envisioned a "Jules Verne sort of adaptation of the premise" which would focus more on the creature's perspective, where the Gill-man ends up together with the female lead. The studio would reject this pitch however, and would replace del Toro with another director. "In a way I am relieved [that they did]," he later reflected. "Seeing the original with my daughter made me realize how perfect it is." Del Toro would later realize some of these story elements for 2017's The Shape of Water.

=== The Wind in the Willows ===
In February 2003, it was reported that del Toro was working with The Walt Disney Company on a live action/CGI animated film adaptation of Kenneth Grahame's novel The Wind in the Willows, which he co-wrote with Matthew Robbins. By November that year, del Toro confirmed that he was no longer attached to the project. "The approach I planned proved to be very expensive and probably weird to the studio. [...] I cherish a scene in which Mr. Toad was paraded though London a bit like The Elephant Man. No wonder they found it weird." In 2008, he further explained why he chose to leave the helm; "It was a beautiful book, and then I went to meet with the executives and they said, 'Could you give Toad a skateboard and make him say, "radical dude" things?' and that's when I said, 'It's been a pleasure ...'"

=== Sleepless Nights ===
Del Toro was attached to direct the Grant Morrison-scripted Sleepless Knights, a fantasy-adventure film sold to DreamWorks Pictures executive Michael De Luca, who left the company in 2004. At Comic-Con in 2008, Morrison stated that the project was being "resurrected" but no longer in development at DreamWorks.

=== A Killing on Carnival Row ===
In 2005, New Line Cinema purchased the feature spec script A Killing on Carnival Row, written by del Toro and Travis Beacham. Del Toro was attached to direct the film, though he would leave to pursue other films, as this was stuck in development. The original script was centered on a detective who investigates a serial killer that preys on mystical creatures, only to find that he himself has become the prime suspect of the murders. In 2015, del Toro and Beachum revived the project, setting it up as a series at Amazon Studios, now titled Carnival Row. Del Toro was set to co-write a pilot version of the feature script with Beacham and René Echevarria. On June 6, 2016, the production was given a pilot order with del Toro still set to be involved. By May 10, 2017, del Toro had stepped away from the project, due to his preoccupation with the production of The Shape of Water.

=== Halo ===
In 2005, del Toro was in negotiations with Peter Jackson to direct a live action film adaptation of the Halo video game series. Del Toro had co-written a script with D. B. Weiss, and Jackson would have executive produced the film. Del Toro opted to make Hellboy II: The Golden Army instead due to the project stalling in development. Halo developer Paul Russel later revealed that del Toro had pitched his mooted script to Joseph Staten at his house, envisioning a brother vs. brother story between the character Master Chief and his twin, who sides with the villain.

=== I Am Legend ===
In 2005, del Toro had "flirted" with directing the 2007 film adaptation of Richard Matheson's novel I Am Legend, after being approached by star Will Smith. In September, Francis Lawrence was announced as the director.

=== Pan ===
Del Toro was the original director of Pan, which was first acquired by New Line Cinema in 2006. A darker version of the J. M. Barrie story, the project was delayed due to New Line's other commitments. It was later revived in 2011 with Joe Wright as director and released in 2015 to critical dismay.

=== Flashback TV series ===
Alongside Trollhunters: Tales of Arcadia and The Strain, del Toro also pitched a series called Flashback to Fox in 2006, which has not been produced in any form since.

=== Deadman ===
On December 4, 2006, Warner Bros. set up a film based on the DC Comics character Deadman as a potential directing vehicle for del Toro, with Gary Dauberman penning the adaptation. In 2009, Nikolaj Arcel was slated to direct Dead Man, with del Toro producing.

=== Tarzan ===
On December 14, 2006, Variety reported that del Toro was in negotiations to direct a Tarzan film scripted by John Collee, from Warner Bros. and producer Jerry Weintraub. Then, in September 2008, it was reported that Stephen Sommers had replaced del Toro as director. Another film version written by Adam Cozad and Craig Brewer, released in 2016 under the title The Legend of Tarzan, was directed by David Yates.

=== 3993 ===
On December 27, 2006, del Toro revealed that he read a screenplay by Sergio G. Sánchez called 3993, and that he wanted to direct the film if he was satisfied with further drafts. He was reluctant to make it however due to its "contemporary elements", with the main story being split up between 1993 and 1939. "It's about how the Spanish Civil War, which a lot of people at the beginning of this new century think is a thing of the past, can come alive then." If made, it was intended to be a spiritual sequel to Pan's Labyrinth and the third and final installment of the "Childhood and War" film trilogy. However, del Toro scrapped the project after deciding to direct Hellboy II: The Golden Army. In October 2022, del Toro confirmed that Pinocchio was the last in the trilogy.

=== Doctor Strange ===
In 2007, del Toro and Neil Gaiman pitched a film based on the Doctor Strange character to Marvel Studios, with Gaiman writing and del Toro directing. This version would have seen the character as an alcoholic, disbarred physician in the late 1920s/1930s living in Greenwich Village for 90 years without aging. It would have also been heavily inspired by the art of Steve Ditko. Gaiman was especially interested in including the character Clea, but the studio was not interested. A film based on Doctor Strange would later be released in 2016, directed by Scott Derrickson.

=== Runoff ===
In April 2007, del Toro was in talks with producer Lloyd Levin to get the film rights for the graphic novel Runoff. In 2011, creator Tom Manning claimed that del Toro had been slowly developing the project over the past year.

=== Champions ===
In November 2007, United Artists recruited del Toro to write, direct and produce the sci-fi action film Champions, which would have been a reboot of the short-lived 1968 British series of the same name. On November 16, 2008, Christopher McQuarrie had come aboard the project, taking over directing duties from and collaborating on the screenplay with del Toro. Tom Cruise and Paula Wagner were still set to produce, despite Wagner's departure from the studio.

=== Saturn and the End of Days ===
On April 20, 2008, at the New York Comic Con, del Toro revealed that he had just begun sketching and pursuing concepts for a film which would be titled Saturn and the End of Days. Del Toro described it as a "little movie about childhood and horror" about a kid named Saturn who watches the world end while walking back and forth from the supermarket.

=== The Hobbit ===
On April 24, 2008, it was officially reported that del Toro would direct a two-part film adaptation of J. R. R. Tolkien's fantasy novel The Hobbit. Del Toro envisioned the first film as a direct adaptation of the novel, with the second bridging the gap between The Hobbit and the Lord of the Rings films. After spending two years in New Zealand working on pre-production, del Toro left the project due to ongoing delays and was replaced by Peter Jackson. The films were expanded to a trilogy during production, with del Toro still credited as co-writer of all three.

=== Untitled third Hellboy film ===
On July 10, 2008, del Toro expressed his interest in directing a third Hellboy film, saying that he would work on the film after finishing The Hobbit. In 2010, during the production of the unmade At the Mountain of Madness, del Toro mentioned that he would direct Hellboy III after his next project, even though the script was not yet written. However, on July 8, 2013, del Toro said that the film was unlikely to be released, and suggested the possibility of telling its story in comic book form. The Hellboy creator Mike Mignola refused to accept the idea. In a Reddit AMA on July 11, 2014, del Toro said:

"Well, you know, we don't have that movie on the horizon, but the idea for it was to have Hellboy finally come to terms with the fact that his destiny, his inevitable destiny, is to become the beast of the Apocalypse, and having him and Liz face the sort of, that part of his nature, and he has to do it, in order to be able to ironically vanquish the foe that he has to face in the third film. He has to become the beast of the Apocalypse to be able to defend humanity, but at the same time, he becomes a much darker being. It's a very interesting ending to the series, but I don't think it will happen. ... We have gone through basically every studio and asked for financing, and they are not interested. I think that the first movie made its budget back, and a little bit of profit, but then it was very very big on video and DVD. The story repeated itself with the second already, it made its money back at the box office, but a small margin of profit in the release of the theatrical print, but was very very big on DVD and video. Sadly now from a business point of view all the studios know is that you don't have that safety net of the DVD and video, so they view the project as dangerous."

On September 26, 2016, Ron Perlman stated on Twitter that he was working on a new Hellboy film, but that del Toro was unlikely to return. On February 21, 2017, del Toro announced on Twitter that the third Hellboy movie had been scrapped. A reboot was released in April 2019 with no involvement from del Toro. In July 2019, Perlman said that he would still love to finish the trilogy with del Toro, ignoring the reboot, and that he thought it could happen if financing could be found.

=== Thor ===
Sometime in 2008, del Toro was hired to direct Thor for Marvel Studios. Because of his admiration of Jack Kirby's work, del Toro entered into negotiations to direct the film. He said that he loved the character of Loki, and wished to incorporate more original Norse mythology into the film; including a "really dingy Valhalla, [with] Vikings and mud". However, by September, del Toro had left the project to direct The Hobbit film adaptation. Thor was instead directed by Kenneth Branagh, and released in 2011.

=== Dr. Jekyll and Mr. Hyde ===
On September 3, 2008, it was reported that del Toro would direct a slate of films for Universal Pictures through his three-year first-look deal, including an early iteration of Frankenstein; which would eventually be made with backing from Netflix. Also among the announced projects was a remake of Dr. Jekyll and Mr. Hyde, which reportedly would have been a more faithful adaptation of Robert Louis Stevenson's original novella, with del Toro interested in exploring the "addictive high" Jekyll experiences as his murderous alter ego. On June 11, 2009, del Toro clarified that he would just be producing the film.

=== Slaughterhouse-Five ===
Also through his three-year picture deal at Universal, del Toro planned "a more literal interpretation" of the Kurt Vonnegut novel Slaughterhouse-Five than shown in the 1972 film adaptation. "There are ways that Vonnegut plays with and juxtaposes time that was perhaps too edgy to be tackled on film at that time," said del Toro. In July 2013, del Toro revealed that he and screenwriter Charlie Kaufman had planned how they had wanted to adapt the work, though del Toro joked; "How can I commit to it being my next movie until there's a screenplay? Charlie Kaufman is a very expensive writer!"

=== Drood ===
The fourth project del Toro had set up at Universal in September 2008 was a film adaptation of Drood, a novel by Dan Simmons. He planned to direct the film after leaving the production of The Hobbit.

=== Heavy Metal ===
On September 4, 2008, it was reported that del Toro, Zack Snyder and Gore Verbinski had each expressed interest in directing segments of David Fincher's new animated Heavy Metal anthology, for Paramount Pictures. It was set to be composed of eight or nine segments, and was being envisioned as an adult-themed R-rated film, but was ultimately deemed too risque for mainstream audiences.

=== The Witches ===
In December 2008, del Toro expressed interest in making a stop-motion film remake of Roald Dahl's novel The Witches with fellow director Alfonso Cuarón. By 2012, he dubbed his draft of The Witches as "the best screenplay I've ever written in any form." It was met with approval by Dahl's widow, "who loved it and felt it was completely respectful of the book", however, it was stuck at Warner Bros. and "not moving at all". No further developments on the potential project emerged until June 2018, when Robert Zemeckis signed on as director of a live-action adaptation. Del Toro remained as screenwriter and producer on The Witches, which was released in 2020.

== 2010s ==
=== Untitled Van Helsing film ===
On June 10, 2010, del Toro was reportedly working on a film treatment based on the Dracula character Van Helsing, to be produced for Universal. Tom Cruise was involved to produce and star in the potential project, which del Toro abandoned to focus on his At the Mountains of Madness adaptation.

=== The Haunted Mansion remake ===
It was announced on July 22, 2010, at San Diego Comic-Con that a new film based on Disneyland's The Haunted Mansion park attraction was in development with del Toro writing and producing. Del Toro saw the 2003 film with his daughters, when asked about his involvement in the new project, he said, "The thing I want to do is remake it." Elaborating, he commented, "The movie I see in my head of Haunted Mansion is not, I believe, what everyone is imagining it to be. Its not just a regular world with a haunted mansion plopped in the middle. I really am thinking of a movie that has a heightened reality." Del Toro said that Hatbox Ghost would be the main haunting and added, "We are not making it a comedy. We are making it scary and fun at the same time, but the scary will be scary." It is to be filmed in live-action 3D. To help make a respectful adaptation, del Toro has contacted Walt Disney World Imagineer Jason Surrell, author of The Haunted Mansion: From the Magic Kingdom to the Movies, to act as a possible consultant for the film. Del Toro has also announced he is aiming for a PG-13 rating for The Haunted Mansion. On August 7, 2012, Del Toro mentioned in an interview with Collider that he had submitted his final draft to Disney, and that "they like the screenplay" because "their reaction to the draft was good." Del Toro revealed that he will co-write the film, but will not direct it. On April 9, 2015, Variety reported that Ryan Gosling is in talks to star in the film and D.V. DeVincentis will work on the film's script. On September 4, 2016, Brigham Taylor signed on to co-produce the film. In August 2019, del Toro stated that he was unsure if the film would be produced though he had a good feeling about the scripts. "My gauging of interest is moot but I would love to see a Haunted Mansion movie by someone who loves it." The film was later revived and released in 2023, with Justin Simien as director.

=== Man of Steel ===
On September 13, 2010, del Toro was selected for the director's position on Man of Steel, but eventually left the project because of his commitment on a film adaptation of At the Mountains of Madness.

=== Trollhunters ===
On September 26, 2010, it was announced that del Toro was setting up a feature project, with the working title Trollhunters, that he would write and direct at DreamWorks Animation. He had already started writing the screenplay at this stage, and planned on finishing it before he went into production on At the Mountains of Madness. A 2012 report from Variety indicated Trollhunters was "likely to be del Toro's directorial debut at DreamWorks" after he had submitted the latest draft that May. He added, "I was very, very cautious not to jump right into directing until my apprenticeship [at DreamWorks] was at a point that I knew how every part of the process is articulated and what I want to do different." He planned to co-direct with former Pixar animator Rodrigo Blaas; but this did not come to pass. The same project was realized four years later in the form of a Netflix series, though del Toro did not ultimately direct any of the episodes.

=== Hulk TV series ===
In November 2010, del Toro was in talks with Marvel Television to make a TV series focused on the Hulk. The series was intended to be aired on ABC. However, after Mark Ruffalo's performance as the character in The Avengers, the project was put on hold.

=== Insane video game ===
On December 11, 2010, at the Spike Video Game Awards, del Toro reported that he was working on a video game entitled Insane, planned for release in 2013. Two days later, he revealed that the game was to be the first entry of an Insane video game trilogy. On March 11, 2011, Fanboy Confidential reported that Guy Davis, who previously worked on del Toro's unmade adaptation of At the Mountains of Madness, was working as key designer. However, on August 16, 2012, IGN reported that the video game was cancelled by the publisher THQ. Despite this, three months later del Toro stated that the game could still happen.

=== Journey to the West ===
In March 2011, Neil Gaiman was tapped by producer Zhang Jizhong to write a new film version of the Chinese folk tale Journey to the West, with del Toro reportedly being courted to direct. Jizhong stated: "[del Toro] has shown a lot of interest but he wants to see the treatment first." James Cameron was also attached to the project, as script consultant and 3D technical advisor.

=== Maleficent ===
In a June 2011 interview with the Los Angeles Times, del Toro expressed his interest in taking on Maleficent, citing the original 1959 animated film Sleeping Beauty as one of his favorite Disney features. "I would love to [direct it]. But I don't want to put too many hopes on it," he said. "They're probably on a fast track and I cannot take any more projects on a fast track." Directors Tim Burton, David Yates, Darren Aronofsky and David O. Russell had also been under consideration before Robert Stromberg signed onto the project as his directorial debut.

=== Beauty ===
In July 2011, producer Denise Di Novi revealed to ComingSoon.net that she was developing a live action film of the "Beauty and the Beast" fairy tale with del Toro producing and Emma Watson set to star as the titular beauty. In August that year, del Toro stated Watson was "perfect" for the film and that they were both interested in pursuing a classic iteration of the tale. In February 2012, it was officially confirmed that del Toro would direct the film, under the title Beauty, for Warner Bros., with Andrew Davies tapped to write the screenplay from a treatment by del Toro. In 2014, he withdrew himself from the project as director, opting instead to produce alongside Di Novi due to scheduling conflicts. Though del Toro's adaptation never materialized, Watson would go on to play the role of Belle in Walt Disney Pictures' 2017 live action remake. Del Toro had wanted to cast Michael Shannon as his version of the Beast, on the basis of his eyes. Channing Tatum was also offered an unspecified role, which he regretfully declined.

=== Pacific Rim 2 ===
In July 2012, prior to Pacific Rim's release, del Toro noted that he had ideas for a sequel, noting in 2014 that he had been working on a script with Zak Penn for several months. In June 2014, del Toro stated that he would direct the sequel, and that it would be released by Universal Pictures, Legendary's new financing and distribution partner, on April 7, 2017. In July 2015, it was reported that filming was expected to begin in November, though production was halted following conflicts between Universal and Legendary. As the sequel's future became unclear, Universal indefinitely delayed the film. Still determined to have the film made, del Toro kept working and by that October announced that he had presented the studio with a script and a budget. In February 2016, the studio, and del Toro himself via Twitter, announced that Steven S. DeKnight would take over directing duties, with a new script written by Jon Spaihts, marking DeKnight's feature directorial debut. Del Toro remained on the project as a producer. Derek Connolly was brought in on May 12, 2016, to rewrite the script again.

=== The Wolverine ===
Around August 2012, del Toro was in negotiations with 20th Century Fox to direct The Wolverine. He had met with producer Jim Gianopulos and actor Hugh Jackman to talk about the film's development, though he would eventually leave the production to pursue other projects. The film was finally released in 2013, directed by James Mangold.

=== Nutshell Studies TV series ===
In September 2012, HBO optioned Nutshell Studies, with del Toro on board as executive producer and director. Based on Corinne May Botz's book The Nutshell Studies of Unexplained Death, with writer Sara Gran adapting, the project was described as a "Hitchcockian" drama about a 1950s housewife who becomes obsessed with solving brutal crimes. It was based on the true story of Frances Glessner Lee, who used dioramas to reconstruct murders.

=== Dark Universe ===
In January 2013, del Toro confirmed his involvement in a live-action film adaptation of the Justice League Dark comic series. While Warner Bros. was considering greenlighting the film's production, and reviewing the script written by Michael Gilio, del Toro revealed that the working title was Dark Universe and that the film would feature appearances by John Constantine, Swamp Thing, The Spectre, Deadman and others. Del Toro later expressed interest in casting Matt Ryan as John Constantine, saying that the Constantine TV series could coexist with the film, because he felt that it could work well, but when the series was not renewed for a second season due to poor ratings, del Toro scrapped the idea. In December 2014, one month after Warner Bros. reviewed his script, del Toro confirmed that the film would be part of the DC Extended Universe. In October 2015, it was officially reported that del Toro had left the project.

=== The Secret Garden ===
In February 2013, it was announced that del Toro was developing a new version of Frances Hodgson Burnett's children's novel The Secret Garden with writer Lucy Alibar. Del Toro would produce the film with Mark Johnson for Universal Pictures, after the company had acquired the rights to the pitch. He was confirmed to not be directing however, due to his busy slate of projects at the time.

=== Monster TV series ===
In April 2013, it was revealed that del Toro and HBO were collaborating on a pilot for a live-action TV series based on Naoki Urasawa's manga Monster. Co-executive producer Stephen Thompson was writing the pilot, while del Toro was to direct it and be an executive producer alongside Don Murphy and Susan Montford. In 2015, del Toro told Latino-Review that HBO had passed on the project and that they were in the process of pitching to other studios.

=== Silent Hills video game ===
In August 2014, Hero complex reported that del Toro was working with game director Hideo Kojima on the PlayStation 4 video game Silent Hills, the ninth installment in the Silent Hill video game series. However, on April 26, 2015, del Toro stated via IGN that he was no longer working with Kojima on Silent Hills and that the project had been cancelled. Then, on July 24, del Toro stated via his Twitter account that he and Kojima were still working on a new untitled project, which later became Death Stranding. In an interview with Shacknews, del Toro said that he would never again get involved in video games after his past experiences.

"I have proven to be the albatross of video games. I joined THQ, and THQ goes broke. I join Kojima, and Kojima leaves Konami, because Metal Gear. I have decided, in order not to destroy anyone else's life, I have decided I will never again get involved in video games. Otherwise, I'll join someone and his house will explode, or something."

=== Untitled Jabba the Hutt film ===
In an interview with Yahoo! Movies in July 2015, del Toro revealed what he had in mind for a Star Wars anthology film. "I would do the sort of Godfather saga that Jabba the Hutt had to go through to gain control," he said. "One, because it's the character that looks the most like me, and I like him. I love the idea of a Hutt-type of mafia, a very complex coup. I just love the character." In a 2017 interview with Collider, del Toro revealed he had already shared his ideas for a Star Wars project with Kathleen Kennedy and John Knoll. He and screenwriter David S. Goyer began working on it after the success of Rogue One, but after the failure of Solo: A Star Wars Story, Disney would cancel several Star Wars projects. A script was completed and concept art was made, but by 2019 the project was officially abandoned. Del Toro later assisted Jon Favreau in The Mandalorian and Grogu after Favreau showed him some of the film's cuts and 3D models, to which del Toro provided him suggestions in regards of the appearances of the appearance of the Hutt characters in the film due finding a connection and personal interest in them since his cancelled Jabba project, being especially drawn to the "fitter and more physically powerful Hutt" of Jeremy Allen White's Rotta.

=== Pet Sematary ===
Del Toro first expressed interest in adapting Stephen King's Pet Sematary into a feature film in October 2015, calling the original work "unrelentingly dark and emotional." In 2021, del Toro reaffirmed his interest making a film of the novel someday, despite the then-recent release of another adaptation.

=== Fantastic Voyage remake ===
On January 7, 2016, del Toro was in talks to direct a remake of Richard Fleischer's Fantastic Voyage for 20th Century Fox, along with the announcement that David S. Goyer and Justin Rhodes would be the writers and that James Cameron would produce the film through Lightstorm Entertainment. In August 2017, it was reported that del Toro had postponed working on the film to completely focus on The Shape of Water. In December 2025, Cameron noted that there was a new script in the works with a new director.

=== Scary Stories to Tell in the Dark ===
On January 14, 2016, it was announced that del Toro would write the screenplay to Scary Stories to Tell in the Dark, as well as direct, and that he would also produce along with Sean Daniel, Jason Brown, and Elizabeth Grave. In February 2016, CBS Films hired The Hageman Brothers to polish the draft. In December 2017, it was reported that André Øvredal would direct the film. The Hagemans received final screenplay credit, with del Toro, Patrick Melton, and Marcus Dunstan receiving "story by" credit.

=== Untitled Michael Mann/George Miller documentary ===
At the Lumière Film Festival in 2017, festival head Thierry Frémaux announced that del Toro would be making a documentary about Michael Mann. The following month, del Toro confirmed that he would be holding two-week interviews with Mann and George Miller, and explore the craftsmanship of both directors. The documentary was effectively postponed once Nightmare Alley entered production, and subsequently shelved following the COVID-19 pandemic.

=== BioShock ===
Writing for ShortList in October 2017, del Toro explained: "As for making movies out of games, the one I could really see is BioShock. I would love to make it into a movie." In 2026, he confirmed to IGN that he tried to make a film of it.

=== Zanbato ===
In 2019, del Toro was attached to write and direct the action film Zanbato, about a young girl with lethal fighting skills, for Paramount Pictures and J. J. Abrams' Bad Robot. According to del Toro, as of the announcement, the film had been in development for six years.

== 2020s ==
=== Frankenstein follow-ups ===
During a video interview in 2020, del Toro described his Frankenstein adaptation as a "two- to three-part story", and said he had "always envisioned" making additional films that would capture the characters' different points of view in order to encompass the complexity of Mary Shelley's original novel. Plans for a follow-up failed to materialize as of 2025.

=== Cabinet of Curiosities season 2 ===
In November 2022, following the premiere of his horror anthology series Cabinet of Curiosities on Netflix, del Toro revealed his plans for a second season to IndieWire and said that he "[has] a list" of possible directors:

"We tried to get Jayro Bustamante before and he couldn't because of COVID. When you think about Mexican filmmakers, there's Issa López. She was going to direct one of the episodes when she got True Detective and she couldn't do it. Boots Riley wrote and was going to direct one episode and he got his series greenlit. I could go and spoil the entire second season for you, but I'm not going to do that. [...] Larry Fessenden is one hundred percent at the very, very top of my list for a second list."

He went on to explain his intent to continue having a creative role in the series, as he cedes more control to different filmmakers, by writing both the opening and closing stories for the next batch. Two months later, del Toro said that he was awaiting confirmation from Netflix about the renewal of Cabinet of Curiosities. When asked in 2025 if there had been movement on a second season, frequent collaborator Dennis Berardi responded:

"[del Toro] talks about it every once in a while, but I don't know the answer. I think he might like to do another one, but I have no idea. I know he's writing a couple of new movies right now, and he's got, I think, ten projects that he's considering. I just don't know. Guillermo told me that he's really only looking to do projects where he is breaking new ground or something that he's afraid of. I think the chances are it might not be on the hit parade. He's looking for, to use his expression, something that maybe gets him out of his comfort zone."

=== Fury ===
While at the 2025 Toronto International Film Festival promoting Frankenstein, del Toro announced a new project that he was writing for star Oscar Isaac, entitled Fury. He described it as a violent film with "thriller aspects", and being akin to My Dinner with Andre "but [with] killing people after each course." A month later, he detailed that the plot follows two men with very different pasts who travel together on a murdering spree and talk over dinner afterwards. It was adapted from the 2016 Spanish film The Fury of a Patient Man. Scott Frank was brought on to co-write the script. "My intention is very different from the Spanish movie," del Toro had noted during an interview for Dazed Digital. "My intention is to have two characters—one that's looking at the past, and one that's looking at the future—having a dialogue. The way I'm going to shoot it is very different from my normal style. I want to do a lot of hand-held. No cranes. The last four or five films have been shot almost entirely on cranes and Steadicam. I want to do a more jagged style."

=== Phantom of the Opera ===
In October 2025, when asked by Inverse which "misunderstood villain" he would like to take on next after Frankenstein's monster, del Toro singled out the Phantom of the Opera, revealing that he had concepts for a film version. "It's such a classic tale, but I would do it differently," he said. "I have a couple of ideas but, you know, for now, I'm going into crime and stop-motion."

=== Something Wicked This Way Comes ===
When presented with a copy of Ray Bradbury's Something Wicked This Way Comes in December 2025, del Toro took the opportunity to mention that he had tried to turn the book into a project. "This is a book I've tried to adapt a few times, I adore it... It is his best book." he said. "I know it very well, and I think it's one of the greatest American novels... And I have an NDA that prevents me from sharing more about how I tried to adapt it."

=== Untitled kidnapping thriller drama ===
In a 2026 Los Angeles Times interview celebrating the twentieth anniversary of Pan's Labyrinth, del Toro expressed a desire to go back to his native Mexico and direct his first Spanish-language film since Pan's Labyrinth in the form of a thriller loosely inspired by his father's 1997 kidnapping. He suggested the project had already been scripted in some form, explaining that the film would be "a kidnapping scene from three points of view: the victim, the people doing the pickup, and another component that I will not reveal."

== Offers ==
=== The Fly sequel ===
Del Toro was offered to direct a sequel to The Fly in 1992. He said the film shouldn't be made because the first film was great, and he later considered that the worst pitch meeting he ever had.

=== Seven ===
Del Toro was offered to direct, but turned it down due to disliking the script's harsh perspective.

=== Freddy vs. Jason ===
Del Toro was offered to direct, but refused to direct another studio horror film after his poor experience with Mimic.

=== Harry Potter and the Prisoner of Azkaban ===
Del Toro had been approached to direct Harry Potter and the Prisoner of Azkaban, the third installment of the Harry Potter film series based on J. K. Rowling's novel of the same name. However, he had envisioned a more Dickensian version of the stories, and was put off by the first two films which he found too "bright and happy and full of light". The film would instead be directed by his close friend Alfonso Cuarón. Del Toro later expressed interest in helming the seventh and eighth installments in the series, if he was allowed to do them on his own terms.

=== Seed of Chucky ===
Del Toro was offered to direct, but no deal was made.

=== The Chronicles of Narnia: The Lion, the Witch and the Wardrobe ===
Del Toro was asked to direct The Chronicles of Narnia: The Lion, the Witch and the Wardrobe, but he revealed he turned it down because, as a "lapsed Catholic," he couldn't see himself bringing the lion Aslan back to life in the story. Instead, del Toro directed Pan's Labyrinth.

=== X-Men: The Last Stand ===
Del Toro was offered to direct, but turned it down to do Pan's Labyrinth.

=== Watchmen ===
Del Toro revealed in 2008 that he was offered Watchmen before Zack Snyder, but "just couldn't get [his] head around The Watchmen being two or three hours long."

=== Oz the Great and Powerful ===
In 2010, del Toro was rumored to replace Sam Mendes as director of Disney's Oz the Great and Powerful, with Robert Downey Jr. still attached to star at the time. Sam Raimi eventually signed on to direct, but with James Franco in the lead instead of Downey.

=== Dawn of the Planet of the Apes ===
In 2012, del Toro was on the shortlist to direct the sequel to Rise of the Planet of the Apes. Matt Reeves eventually went on to direct it.

=== Star Wars: The Force Awakens ===
In 2013, del Toro confirmed to The Playlist that he'd been offered The Force Awakens but was too busy and ultimately passed. He did however pitch a film centered around the Jabba the Hutt character to Lucasfilm executive John Knoll.

== Producer only ==
=== The Meg ===
In 2005, del Toro was set to produce The Meg when the project was being developed at New Line Cinema.

=== The Call of the Sea ===
In 2006, del Toro boarded Chilean director Jorge Olguin's horror film project The Call of the Sea as an executive producer. Leonor Varela was cast in the role of a marine biologist who discovers the connection between her family's past and the legend of a ghost ship that seeks the souls of fishermen.

=== Born ===
In 2007, it was announced that del Toro would produce Born, a film using a combination of live action and stop-motion and elements from film such as The Sixth Sense, The Wicker Man, Rosemary's Baby, and Straw Dogs. Alongside del Toro, Lawrence Gordon and Lloyd Levin were listed as producers, with Clive Barker executive producing. Jennifer Connelly and Paul Bettany were set to star as husband and pregnant wife Joe and Vanessa, whose lives are shattered when they settle in an idyllic English town where the locals are almost too friendly, to raise their unborn child and for Joe to build his claymation workshop, when his claymation cartoons start to come to life and reenact his nightmares about a young girl's murder. The Chiodo Brothers, known for Killer Klowns from Outer Space, were set to create the animation.

=== The Changeling remake ===
In 2007, it was revealed that del Toro would be producing a remake of the 1980 horror film The Changeling for Rogue Pictures. No director had been attached to the project, but early drafts were written by Paul Haggis alongside David Kajganich.

=== The Orphanage remake ===
In 2007, New Line Cinema bought the rights to produce an English-language remake of The Orphanage with del Toro as producer. On remakes, the original's director J. A. Bayona noted that "The Americans have all the money in the world but can't do anything, while we can do whatever we want but don't have the money" and "The American industry doesn't take chances, that's why they make remakes of movies that were already big hits". On August 4, 2009, Larry Fessenden was announced as the director of the American remake. Fessenden later announced that he would not be involved with directing the remake, stating "Working on the script with Guillermo was a very exciting experience, but then I got into a casting miasma and that's where the thing is; I think they're gonna do it another way, actually. So I think I'm out of it. Hopefully they'll still use my script, but I'm not sure I'm directing it anymore". In January 2010, Mark Pellington replaced Larry Fessenden as director of the project. On August 5, 2011, del Toro stated that the remake would reflect his original vision for the film, and that it had been planned even when the first version was in production. "Even when we produced the Spanish movie, I had intended to remake it because we had a very different screenplay that, because of money and time, got turned into the movie you saw – which is great, but there was this other structure for the original script that I wanted to try. So even before we shot the first film it was an economic decision, a pre-existing creative decision, to change it." Del Toro also praised the new film's director. "We have Mark Pellington attached as director – I'm a big fan of his The Mothman Prophecies and his video work – and we are out to actors, so we're hoping to get things going soon." On August 30, 2011, it was reported that American actress Amy Adams was in talks to star as Laura, the main character, who was played by Belén Rueda in the original film. It was also stated that the current incarnation of the remake screenplay had been written by Larry Fessenden and Sergio G. Sánchez, the sole writer of the original film.

=== Mnemovore ===
In 2007, Hans Rodionoff, co-creator of the Mnemovore DC horror comic, confirmed he would be directing a film version of the story executive produced by del Toro. Rodionoff presented footage of a demo reel during the H. P. Lovecraft Film Festival in October, which was apparently filmed at del Toro's behest.

=== Death and Me ===
In 2007, a film based on Death: The High Cost of Living, to be called Death and Me, was under production at New Line Cinema. Neil Gaiman wrote the screenplay, and would also direct, with del Toro as executive producer. Gaiman spent several days on the set of del Toro's Hellboy II: The Golden Army to get pointers on how to direct. On October 14, 2010, it was reported in an interview with Gaiman that as of June or July, DC and Warner Bros. had closed down work on the film.

=== Hater ===
In 2008, del Toro revealed that he was set to produce, alongside Mark Johnston, J. A. Bayona's film adaptation of Hater by David Moody for Universal.

=== Hellboy: Silverlance ===
In 2010, the Hellboy screenwriter Peter Briggs was asked by Universal to script a spin-off centring on Prince Nuada and provisionally agreed that Briggs could direct the film in New Zealand. Briggs began work on an outline with co-writer Aaron Mason. Titled Hellboy: Silverlance, the script was a B.P.R.D story featuring Abe Sapien in a main role with Hellboy in a supporting role. Moving into the new B.P.R.D. headquarters in Colorado, Abe is troubled by his psychic connection with Princess Nuala, and begins researching the elves' history. The film would have shown Nuada's adventures throughout history, including his rivalry with a fairy courtier who orchestrates Nuada's exile in hopes of marrying Nuala and seizing control of the fairy kingdom; Nuada first meeting Mister Wink by saving him from a troupe of soldiers during the Spanish Inquisition; and Nuada in Nazi Germany, engineering a pact to keep various supernatural entities safe during World War II (with Nuada and Kroenen fighting in a "friendly" match for Project Ragnarok men). Doug Jones would have played both Abe and the Angel of Death, who strikes a bargain with Nuada. Rupert Evans's Agent Myers would also have returned. The story climaxed at the new B.P.R.D. headquarters, with the return of Rasputin's summoning gauntlet. Universal wanted to proceed with the project, but it emerged that del Toro's Hellboy III was still a possibility, so Silverlance was shelved. In 2015, Briggs received another call from Universal, saying that the third Hellboy film had been cancelled and asking him and Mason to return for a reworked Silverlance, with producers del Toro and Lawrence Gordon involved. The caveat was that Hellboy could not appear, but the writers managed to get the character a cameo appearance at the climax. If successful, the film would have launched a From the Files of the B.P.R.D. spin-off series. In May 2017, Briggs affirmed that, with the announcement of the Hellboy reboot, the Silverlance project was dead.

=== Alma ===
In October 2010, it was announced that DreamWorks Animation was developing an animated feature film based on the short film Alma. Short's director Rodrigo Blaas was set to direct the feature, with del Toro executive producing it. In November 2011, it was reported that the studio hired Megan Holley, a writer of Sunshine Cleaning, to write the script. Del Toro, who was also helping with the story and the design work, said in June 2012 that the film was in visual development. However, the project was likely abandoned due to del Toro's commitment to other projects.

=== The Bloody Benders ===
In April 2012, according to Deadline Hollywood, del Toro was involved to produce Adam Robitel's spec script about the serial killers the Bloody Benders. Del Toro was set to produce the film with Don Murphy and Susan Montford, but there was no public forward movement as of the announcement.

=== Terrified remake ===
In December 2018, it was reported that del Toro would produce a remake of the 2017 Argentinian horror film Terrified for Fox Searchlight. Demián Rugna, who wrote and directed the original film, was going to return to direct the remake, with screenplay by Sacha Gervasi.

=== Untitled werewolf Western film ===
In August 2019, Mexican filmmaker Issa López, revealed that her next film will be a "werewolf-Western" which she would direct with the producing assistance of del Toro. In May 2020, López told Collider that she had just finished the second draft of the script before the COVID-19 lockdown began and sent it to del Toro.

=== Our Love Is Here to Stay ===
Del Toro was going to produce Peter Bogdanovich's final project before his death; a biopic at Netflix about the brothers Gershwin titled Our Love Is Here to Stay. In May 2022, Bogdanovich's widow confirmed that the film was still being developed but under a new director.

== See also ==
- Guillermo del Toro filmography
