= Lovecraft: Fear of the Unknown =

- DVD cover
- Directed by: Frank H. Woodward
- Produced by: William Janczewski; James B. Myers; Frank H. Woodward
- Starring: Ramsey Campbell; John Carpenter; Guillermo del Toro; Neil Gaiman; Stuart Gordon; S. T. Joshi; Caitlin R. Kiernan; Andrew Migliore; Robert M. Price; Peter Straub
- Cinematography: Don Spiro
- Release date: July 24, 2008 (Comic-Con)
- Running time: 90 minutes
- Country: United States
- Language: English

Lovecraft: Fear of the Unknown is a 2008 documentary film about American writer H. P. Lovecraft.

== Summary ==
The film examines the life, work, and mind of the creator of the Cthulhu Mythos. It features interviews with Guillermo del Toro, Neil Gaiman, John Carpenter, Peter Straub, Caitlin R. Kiernan, Ramsey Campbell, Stuart Gordon, S. T. Joshi, Robert M. Price, and Andrew Migliore.

== Release and reception ==
The film was released on Blu-ray and DVD in the United States on October 27, 2009.

Johnny Butane of the website Dread Central gave the film a score of 4 out of 5, calling it a "solid documentary that’s sure to appeal to everyone from casual Lovecraft readers to the most hardcore of his fans".

== Awards ==
The film won Best Documentary at the 2008 Comic-Con International Independent Film Festival. It was the official selection at: Cinema Du Parc in Collaboration With The Fantasia Festival 2008; Erie Horror Film Festival 2008; Buenos Aires Rojo Sangre Festival 2008; Shriekfest Horror Film Festival 2008; The H.P. Lovecraft Film Festival 2008; TromaDance 2009 and Porto Alegre, Brazil's Fantaspoa Festival 2009.
