= Geometria (film) =

- Directed by: Guillermo del Toro
- Screenplay by: Guillermo del Toro
- Based on: Naturally by Fredric Brown
- Produced by: Guillermo del Toro; Juan Carlos Muñoz; Antonio Hernandez; Javier Antonio Soto
- Starring: Fernando Garcia Marin; Guadalupe del Toro; Rodrigo Mora
- Cinematography: Juan Carlos Muñoz
- Edited by: Sigfrido Barjau; Peter Devaney
- Music by: Christopher Drake
- Release date: 1987
- Running time: 0:08:54 (original cut); 0:06:30 (director's cut)
- Country: Mexico
- Language: Spanish
- Budget: $1,000

Geometria is a 1987 short fantasy horror comedy film written and directed by Guillermo del Toro. It is based loosely on Fredric Brown's short story "Naturally", which was originally published in Beyond Fantasy Fiction and later reprinted in the short story collection Honeymoon in Hell. Geometria was shot in Guadalajara, Jalisco in Mexico. It is the tenth short film del Toro directed, though all but 1985's Doña Lupe remain unreleased.

Del Toro was not satisfied with the original cut of the film, and said that he was not able to finish it the way he wanted to at the time. A director's cut of the film, slightly shorter than the 1987 cut, with a new music score composed by Christopher Drake was included on The Criterion Collection's 2010 release of del Toro's 1993 feature film debut, Cronos.

In the film, a high school student has repeatedly failed his geometry exams. He summons a demon to fulfill his wishes, in hopes of both passing the exams and of resurrecting his father. The demon twists the meaning of his wishes to inflict horror on the student. He then explains that the student's poor understanding of geometry has doomed him. Instead of drawing a protective pentagon (as per instructions), the student had drawn a hexagon. Which is useless for protecting him.

== Plot ==
A Mexican widow (Guadalupe del Toro) receives a letter from the high school attended by her son (Fernando Garcia Marin). It informs her that the boy is about to fail his geometry exams for the third time. The woman berates her son, then turns on the television, refusing to speak to him. The boy leaves the room, vowing that he will never fail geometry again.

The boy resorts to using black magic in order to pass the exam. In a dark room, he reads from a tome of sorcery, which states, "As a protection for the invocation of a major demon, place yourself inside a pentagon drawn with your own blood. This pentagon will be your only protection." The boy proceeds to follow these instructions.

While the woman sits in the living room, watching a pastiche of The Exorcist, she hears her son screaming from the next room. When she enters, she finds him standing in the middle of the bloody seal. He shouts a warning, telling her that the pentagon is his only protection. A glowing portal opens in the wall, and a demon (Rodrigo Mora) steps through. The boy asks the demon to grant two wishes. The first is that he will not fail geometry again. The second is the return of his father, Francisco, who died in an accident three months ago. The demon complies with the latter, causing Francisco to materialise immediately. However, he is now a mindless zombie. Francisco kills and eats his wife, while their son looks on in horror, unable to step out of the pentagon for fear of losing its magical protection.

The demon commands the boy to surrender, but he refuses to give in, saying that he cannot be harmed while he stands within the pentagon. The demon reasons that he has already granted one of the boy's two wishes: his family is together again. He also points out that what the boy has drawn is not a pentagon, but a hexagon, which offers no magical protection whatsoever. The demon muses that the boy's other wish has also been granted: he will never fail geometry again. Francisco approaches his son from behind and takes hold of his head, tilting it backwards. The boy laments the unfairness of his situation. The demon agrees, and reaches out a hand to take hold of his throat. The screen fades to black as ripping sounds are heard.

"I was finally able to finish it for these discs; this is the first time ever that it's going to be seen in its proper form. It's a really gory and crazy little movie, done in the style of Dario Argento/Mario Bava/color-saturated horror. You guys actually saw it back in the days of Starlog; I sent it in to the final Cinemagic contest [sponsored by that long-defunct magazine], and you sent me back a handwritten letter saying that you guys had liked it. It was not a finalist, it didn't win any prize, but you liked it, and I still have your letter!"

— Guillermo del Toro, director of Geometria, discussing the release of the director's cut.

== Reception ==
Bloody Disgusting said, "Geometria makes for an inspiring short from a filmmaking standpoint, as well as a humorous piece of gruesome horror for the casual fan."
