= Guillermo del Toro =

Mexican filmmaker (born 1964)

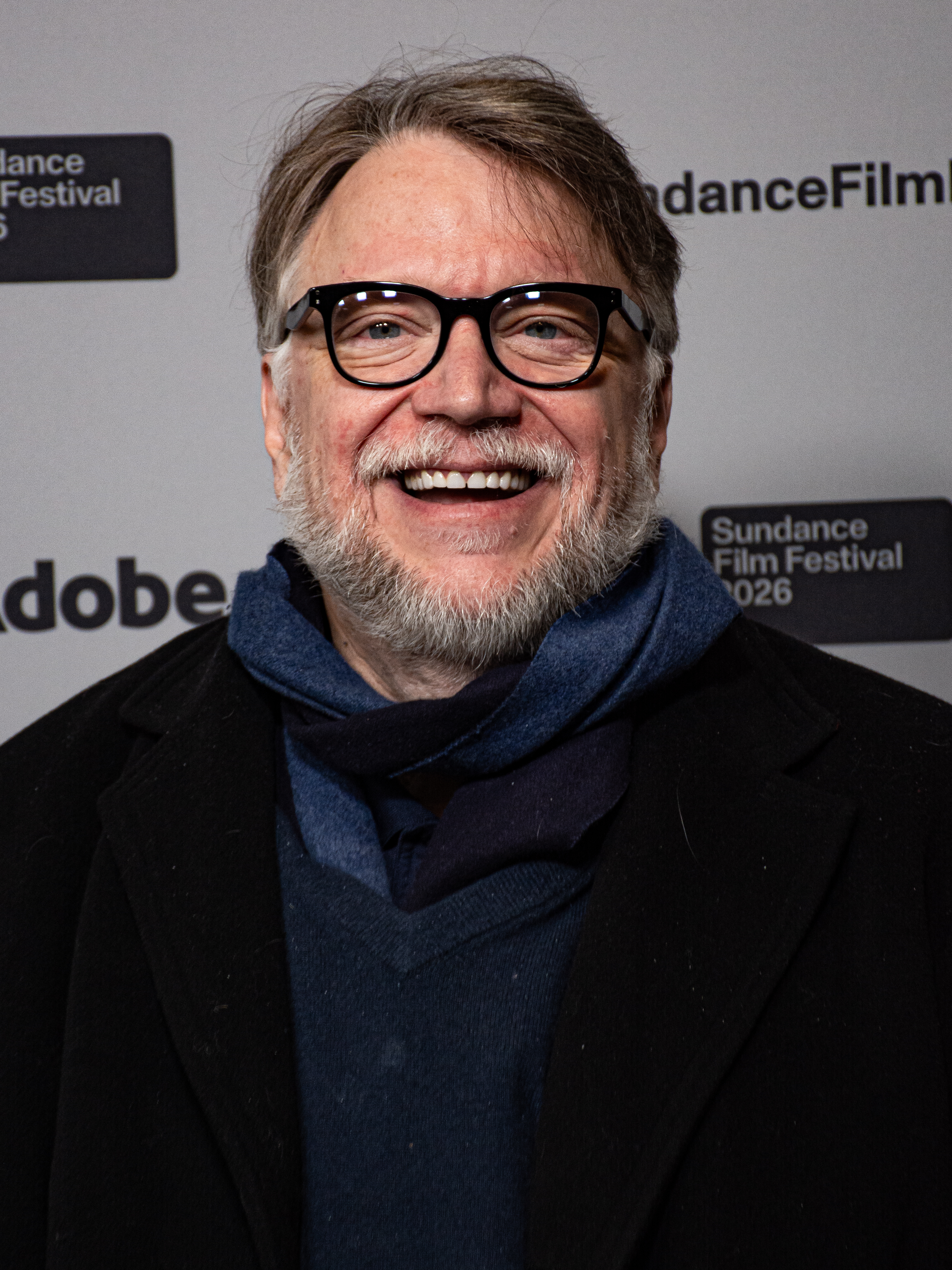
- Del Toro at the 2026 Sundance Film Festival
- Born: Guillermo del Toro Gómez; 9 October 1964 (age 62); Guadalajara, Jalisco, Mexico
- Occupations: Film director; producer; screenwriter
- Years active: 1985–present
- Works: Filmography; Unrealized projects
- Spouses: Lorenza Newton (m. 1986; div. 2017) Kim Morgan (m. 2021)
- Children: 2
- Awards: Full list

Guillermo del Toro Gómez (Spanish: [ɡiˈʝeɾmo ðel ˈtoɾo ˈɡomes]; born 9 October 1964) is a Mexican filmmaker and actor. His work has been characterized by a strong connection to fairy tales, gothicism, and horror, often blending the genres, with an effort to infuse visual or poetic beauty in the grotesque. He has had a lifelong fascination with monsters, which he considers symbols of great power. Del Toro is known for pioneering dark fantasy in the film industry and for his use of insectile and religious imagery, his themes of Catholicism and the effects of war, celebrating imperfection, underworld motifs, practical special effects, and dominant amber lighting.

Throughout his career, del Toro has shifted between Spanish-language films—such as Cronos (1993), The Devil's Backbone (2001), and Pan's Labyrinth (2006)—and English-language films, including Mimic (1997), Blade II (2002), Hellboy (2004) and its sequel Hellboy II: The Golden Army (2008), Pacific Rim (2013), Crimson Peak (2015), The Shape of Water (2017), Nightmare Alley (2021), Pinocchio (2022), and Frankenstein (2025). As a producer or writer, he has worked on the films The Orphanage (2007), Don't Be Afraid of the Dark (2010), The Hobbit film series (2012–2014), Mama (2013), The Book of Life (2014), Pacific Rim: Uprising (2018), Scary Stories to Tell in the Dark (2019), and The Witches (2020).

In 2022, he created the Netflix anthology horror series Guillermo del Toro's Cabinet of Curiosities, featuring a collection of classical horror stories. With Chuck Hogan, del Toro also co-authored The Strain trilogy of novels (2009–2011), later adapted into a comic-book series (2011–15) and a live-action television series (2014–17). With DreamWorks Animation and Netflix, he created the animated franchise Tales of Arcadia, which includes the series Trollhunters (2016–18), 3Below (2018–19), and Wizards (2020), and the sequel film Trollhunters: Rise of the Titans (2021).

Del Toro is close friends with fellow Mexican filmmakers Alfonso Cuarón and Alejandro González Iñárritu. Del Toro's accolades include three Academy Awards, three BAFTA Awards, two Golden Globe Awards, a Daytime Emmy Award, and a Golden Lion. He was included in Time magazine's list of the 100 most influential people in the world in 2018, and received a motion picture star on the Hollywood Walk of Fame in 2019.

== Early life ==
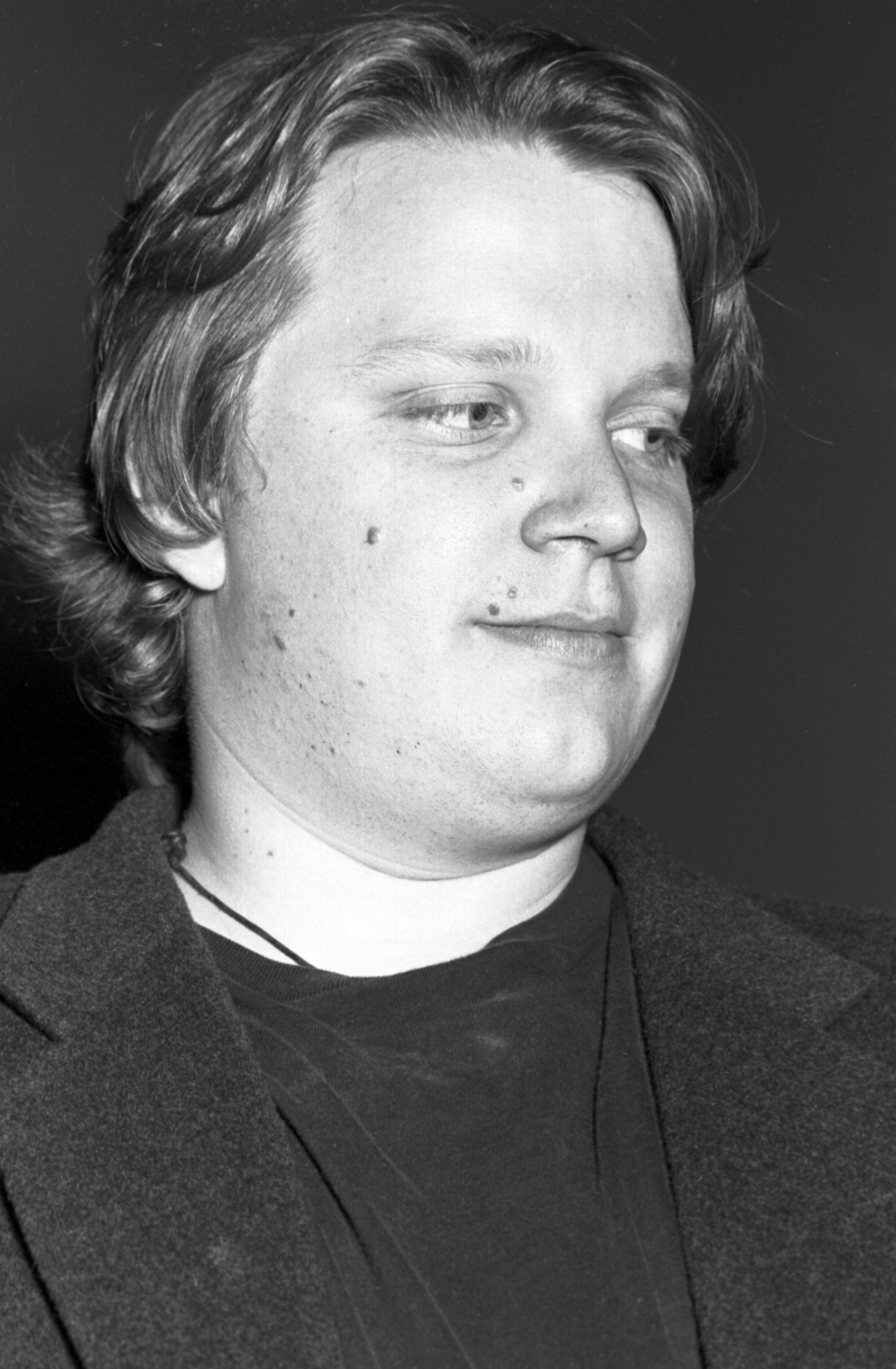
Del Toro promoting his first feature film, Cronos, which was released in 1993

Guillermo del Toro Gómez was born in the city of Guadalajara, Jalisco, on 9 October 1964, the son of Guadalupe Gómez Camberos and automotive entrepreneur Federico del Toro Torres. Del Toro's parents were both of Spanish descent. Raised in a strict Catholic household, he attended the University of Guadalajara's Centro de Investigación y Estudios Cinematográficos (Film Studies Center).

In 1969, his father won a lottery worth $6 million, enabling del Toro to be raised among books and exotic animals; he described their home as "an enchanted castle".

When del Toro was about eight years old, he began experimenting with his father's Super 8 camera, making short films with Planet of the Apes toys and other objects. One short film focused on a "serial killer potato" with ambitions of world domination; it murdered del Toro's mother and brothers before stepping outside and being crushed by a car. Del Toro made about 10 short films before his first feature, including one titled Matilde, but only the last two, Doña Lupe and Geometria, have been made available. He wrote four episodes and directed five episodes of the cult series La Hora Marcada, along with other Mexican filmmakers such as Emmanuel Lubezki and Alfonso Cuarón.

== Career ==
=== 1993–2001: Early films and breakthrough ===
His first movie was supposed to be a stop-motion sci-fi feature called Omnivore, about a lizard-man born in a savage land where everything tries to eat everything else. He and his team built sets and about 100 puppets over a three-year period prior to filming. Vandals burglarized the studio one night and destroyed the puppets and sets, which put an end to his project as del Toro decided to switch to a live-action film, Cronos.

Del Toro studied special effects and make-up with special-effects artist Dick Smith. He spent 10 years as a special-effects make-up designer and formed his own company, Necropia. He also co-founded the Guadalajara International Film Festival. Later in his directing career, he was a co-founder of the production company, the "Tequila Gang" together with filmmaker Alfonso Cuarón, screenwriter Laura Esquivel, producer Berta Navarro and sales agent Rosa Bosch.

In 1997, at the age of 33, Guillermo was given a $30 million budget from Miramax (then owned by Disney) to shoot another film, Mimic. He was ultimately unhappy with the way Miramax treated him during production, which led to his friend James Cameron almost coming to blows with Miramax co-founder and owner Harvey Weinstein during the 70th Academy Awards.

=== 2002–2016: Franchise films and The Strain ===
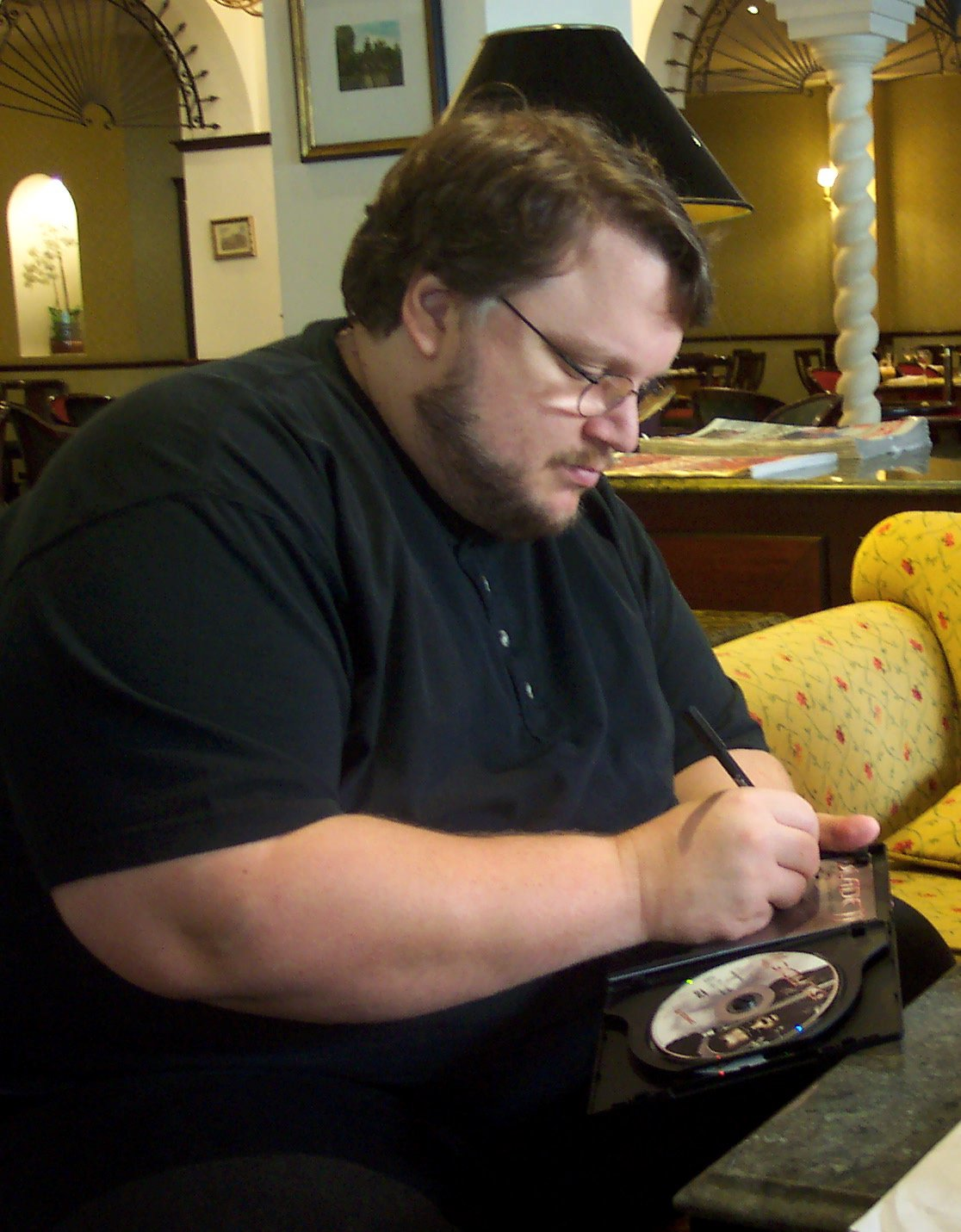
Del Toro being interviewed in 2002

Del Toro has directed a wide variety of films, from comic book adaptations (Blade II, Hellboy and its sequel Hellboy II: The Golden Army) to historical fantasy and horror films, two of which are set in Spain in the context of the Spanish Civil War under the authoritarian rule of Francisco Franco. These two films, The Devil's Backbone and Pan's Labyrinth, are among his most critically acclaimed works. They share similar settings, protagonists and themes with the 1973 Spanish film The Spirit of the Beehive, widely considered to be the finest Spanish film of the 1970s.

I cannot pontificate about it, but by the time I'm done, I will have done one movie, and it's all the movies I want.

People say, you know, "I like your Spanish movies more than I like your English-language movies because they are not as personal," and I go "Fuck, you're wrong!" Hellboy is as personal to me as Pan's Labyrinth. They're tonally different, and yes, of course you can like one more than the other—the other one may seem banal or whatever it is that you don't like. But it really is part of the same movie. You make one movie. Hitchcock did one movie, all his life.

— Guillermo del Toro, Twitch Film, 15 January 2013

Del Toro views the horror genre as inherently political, explaining, "Much like fairy tales, there are two facets of horror. One is pro-institution, which is the most reprehensible type of fairy tale: Don't wander into the woods, and always obey your parents. The other type of fairy tale is completely anarchic and antiestablishment."

He is close friends with two other prominent and critically praised Mexican filmmakers Alfonso Cuarón and Alejandro González Iñárritu. The three often influence each other's directorial decisions, and have been interviewed together by Charlie Rose. Cuarón was one of the producers of Pan's Labyrinth, while Iñárritu assisted in editing the film. The three filmmakers, referred to as the "Three Amigos" founded the production company Cha Cha Cha Films, whose first release was 2008's Rudo y Cursi.

Del Toro has also contributed to the web series Trailers from Hell. In April 2008, del Toro was hired by Peter Jackson to direct the live-action film adaptation of J. R. R. Tolkien's The Hobbit. On 30 May 2010, del Toro left the project due to extended delays brought on by MGM's financial troubles. Although he did not direct the films, he is credited as co-writer in An Unexpected Journey, The Desolation of Smaug and The Battle of the Five Armies. On 1 December 2008, del Toro expressed interest in a stop-motion remake of Roald Dahl's novel The Witches in collaboration with Alfonso Cuarón. On 19 June 2018, it was announced that Del Toro and Cuarón would instead be attached as executive producers on the remake with Robert Zemeckis helming the project and writing.

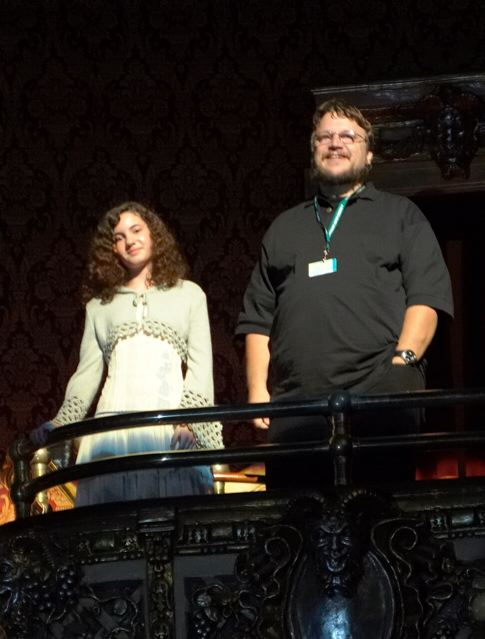
Ivana Baquero and del Toro receive a standing ovation after the North American premiere of Pan's Labyrinth at the 2006 Toronto International Film Festival

On 2 June 2009, del Toro's first novel, The Strain, was released. It is the first part of an apocalyptic vampire trilogy co-authored by del Toro and Chuck Hogan. The second volume, The Fall, was released on 21 September 2010. The final installment, The Night Eternal, followed in October 2011. Del Toro cites writings of Antoine Augustin Calmet, Montague Summers and Bernhardt J. Hurwood among his favourites in the non-literary form about vampires. On 9 December 2010, del Toro launched Mirada Studios with his long-time cinematographer Guillermo Navarro, director Mathew Cullen and executive producer Javier Jimenez. Mirada was formed in Los Angeles, California to be a collaborative space where they and other filmmakers can work with Mirada's artists to create and produce projects that span digital production and content for film, television, advertising, interactive and other media. Mirada launched as a sister company to production company Motion Theory.

Del Toro directed Pacific Rim, a science fiction film based on a screenplay by del Toro and Travis Beacham. In the film, giant monsters rise from the Pacific Ocean and attack major cities, leading humans to retaliate with gigantic mecha suits called Jaegers. Del Toro commented, "This is my most un-modest film, this has everything. The scale is enormous and I'm just a big kid having fun." The film was released on 12 July 2013 and grossed $411 million at the box office.

Del Toro directed "Night Zero", the pilot episode of The Strain, a vampire horror television series based on the novel trilogy of the same name by del Toro and Chuck Hogan. FX had commissioned the pilot episode, which del Toro scripted with Hogan and was filmed in Toronto in September 2013. FX ordered a thirteen-episode first season for the series on 19 November 2013, and series premiered on 13 July 2014.

After The Strain's pilot episode, del Toro directed Crimson Peak, a gothic horror film he co-wrote with Matthew Robbins and Lucinda Cox. Del Toro has described the film as "a very set-oriented, classical but at the same time modern take on the ghost story", citing The Omen, The Exorcist and The Shining as influences. Del Toro also stated, "I think people are getting used to horror subjects done as found footage or B-value budgets. I wanted this to feel like a throwback." Jessica Chastain, Tom Hiddleston, Mia Wasikowska, and Charlie Hunnam starred in the film. Production began February 2014 in Toronto, with an April 2015 release date initially planned. The studio later pushed the date back to October 2015, to coincide with the Halloween season. He was selected to be on the jury for the main competition section of the 2015 Cannes Film Festival.

=== 2017–2019: Awards success and acclaim ===
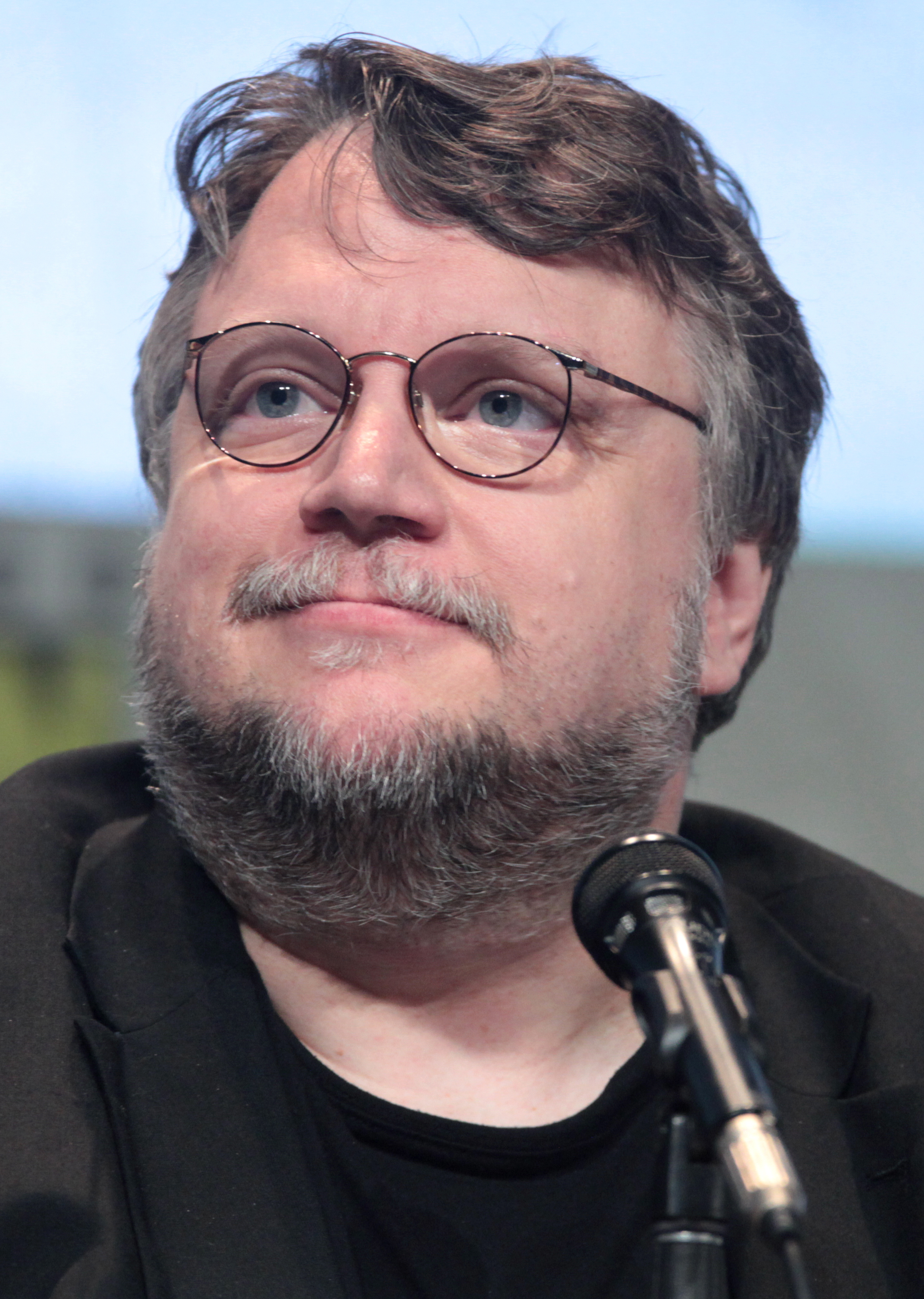
Del Toro at San Diego Comic-Con in 2015

Del Toro directed the Cold War drama film The Shape of Water, starring Sally Hawkins, Octavia Spencer, and Michael Shannon. Filming began on 15 August 2016 in Toronto, and wrapped twelve weeks later. On 31 August 2017, the film premiered in the main competition section of the 74th Venice International Film Festival, where it was awarded the Golden Lion for best film, making Del Toro the first Mexican director to win the award. The film became a critical and commercial success and would go on to win multiple accolades, including the Academy Award for Best Picture, with del Toro winning the Academy Award for Best Director.

Del Toro collaborated with Japanese video game director and long-time friend Hideo Kojima to produce P.T., a video game intended to be a "playable trailer" for the ninth Silent Hill game, which was cancelled. The demo was also removed from the PlayStation Network amidst major controversies. At the D23 Expo in 2009, his Double Dare You production company and Disney announced a production deal for a line of darker animated films. The label was announced with one original animated project, Trollhunters: Tales of Arcadia. However, del Toro moved his deal to DreamWorks Animation in late 2010. From 2016 to 2018, Trollhunters was released to great acclaim on Netflix and "is tracking to be its most-watched kids original ever."

In 2017, Del Toro had an exhibition of work titled Guillermo del Toro: At Home with Monsters, featuring his collection of paintings, drawings, maquettes, artifacts, and concept film art. The exhibition ran from 1 August 2016 to 27 Nov 2016 at the Los Angeles County Museum of Art, from 5 March 2017 to 28 May 2017 at the Minneapolis Institute of Art, and from 30 September 2017 to 7 January 2018 at the Art Gallery of Ontario in Toronto. A book about the exhibition was also published.

In 2019, del Toro reunited with Hideo Kojima following the cancellation of their previous project, Silent Hills, to appear in his video game Death Stranding, providing his likeness for the character Deadman, a role which he would reprise for the game's sequel in 2025.

=== 2020–present: Career expansion ===
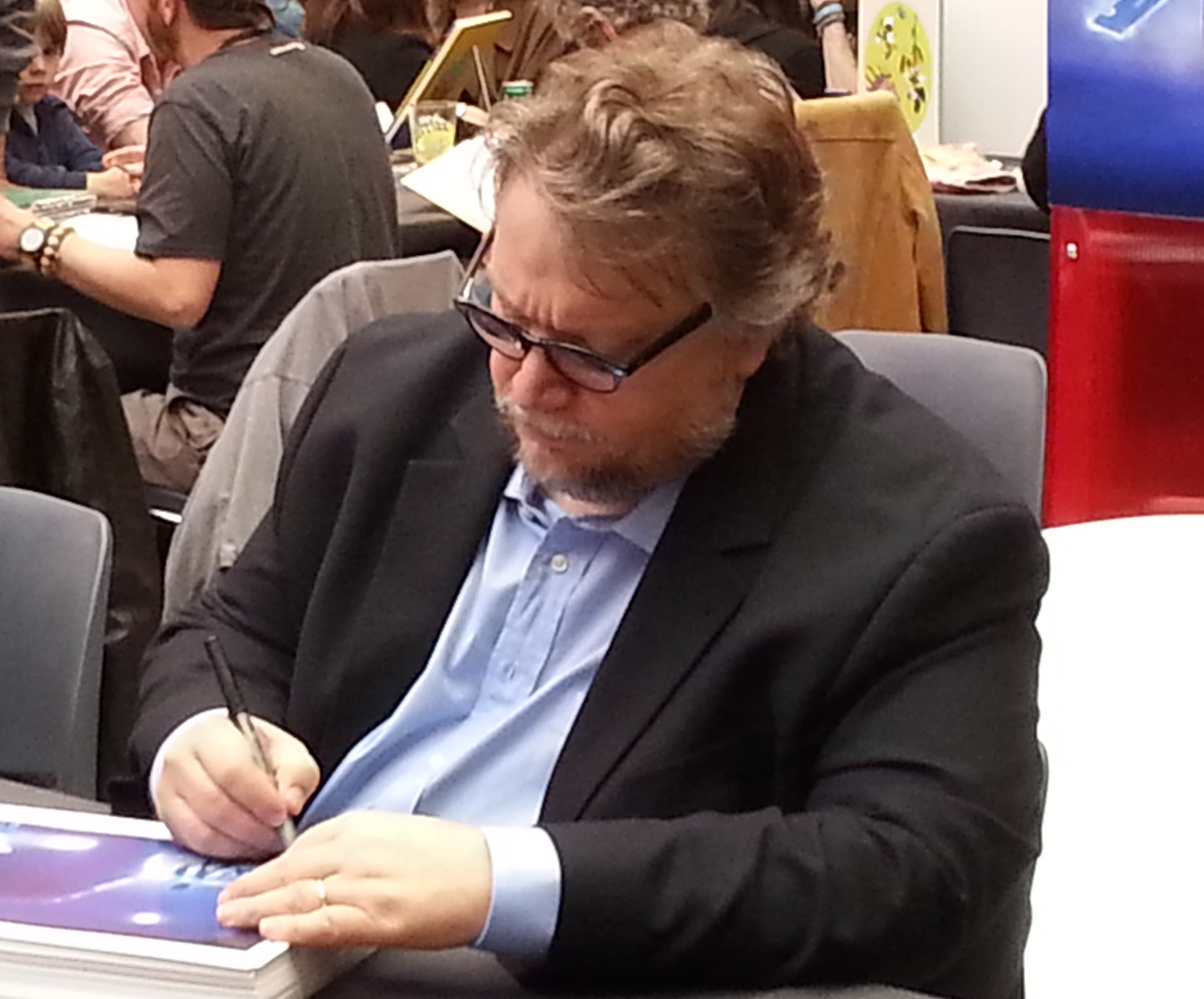
Guillermo del Toro in Annecy in 2016

In December 2017, Searchlight Pictures announced that del Toro would direct a new adaptation of the 1946 novel Nightmare Alley by William Lindsay Gresham, the screenplay of which he co-wrote with his future wife Kim Morgan. In 2019, it was reported that Bradley Cooper, Cate Blanchett, Toni Collette and Rooney Mara had closed deals to star in the film, which went into production in January 2020. It was released in December 2021 to positive reviews but was a box office failure. The film received four Academy Award nominations, including Best Picture.

In 2008, del Toro announced he was working on a dark stop-motion film adaptation of the Italian novel The Adventures of Pinocchio, co-directed by Adam Parrish King, with The Jim Henson Company as production company, and music by Nick Cave. The project had been in development for over a decade. The pre-production was begun by the studio ShadowMachine. In 2017, del Toro announced that Patrick McHale is co-writing the script of the film. In the same year, del Toro revealed at the 74th Venice International Film Festival that the film will be reimagined during the rise of Benito Mussolini, and that he would need $35 million to make it. In November 2017, it was reported that del Toro had cancelled the project because no studios were willing to finance it. In October 2018, it was announced that the film had been revived, with Netflix backing the project. Netflix had previously collaborated with del Toro on Trollhunters. Many of the same details of the project remain the same, but with Mark Gustafson now co-directing rather than Adam Parrish King. It premiered at the BFI London Film Festival on 15 October 2022, and received a theatrical release on 9 November of the same year before a scheduled release on Netflix in December. The film won the Best Animated Feature at the 95th Academy Awards.

In March 2023, it was confirmed that Del Toro would next direct his long in-development Frankenstein film, now based at Netflix. Speaking about the film's significance in his filmography up to that point, Del Toro said: "This movie closes the cycle. If you look at the lineage, from Cronos to The Devil's Backbone, to Pan's Labyrinth to Crimson Peak to this, this is an evolution of a certain type of aesthetic, and a certain type of rhythm, and a certain type of empathy. I feel like I need a change ... You never know ... but right now, my desire is to try and do something very different." The film saw a limited theatrical release starting on 17 October 2025, with Oscar Isaac and Jacob Elordi as Victor Frankenstein and The Creature, respectively.

==== Upcoming ====
Announced in February 2023, del Toro will reteam with Netflix and ShadowMachine on the stop-motion film The Buried Giant. At the 2023 Annecy International Animation Film Festival he said he planned to leave live-action films and just do animation: "There are a couple more live-action movies I want to do but not many. After that, I only want to do animation. That's the plan." He also expressed frustration over the fact that five of his projects were turned down by studios in just two months.

== Recurring collaborators ==
Work Actor	1993	1997	2001	2002	2004	2006	2008	2013	2014–2017	2015	2016–2021	2017	2021	2022	2022	2025	—N/a
Work Actor	Cronos	Mimic	The Devil's Backbone	Blade II	Hellboy	Pan's Labyrinth	Hellboy II: The Golden Army	Pacific Rim	The Strain	Crimson Peak	Tales of Arcadia	The Shape of Water	Nightmare Alley	Cabinet of Curiosities	Pinocchio	Frankenstein	Total
Federico Luppi†																	3
Ron Perlman																	8
Doug Jones																	7
Santiago Segura																	5
John Hurt† (Note: Hurt portrayed Professor Abraham Setrakian in the pilot of The Strain before being replaced by David Bradley when it was order to series.)																	3
Burn Gorman																	4
David Bradley																	4
Jonathan Hyde																	3
Danny Waugh																	4
David Hewlett																	3
Tim Blake Nelson																	3

== Personal life ==
=== Family and residences ===
Del Toro met and began dating Lorenza Newton, cousin of singer Guadalupe Pineda, when they were both studying at the Instituto de Ciencias in Guadalajara. They were married in 1986 and had two daughters together before divorcing in September 2017. In 2021, he married Kim Morgan, an American film historian who was formerly married to Canadian filmmaker Guy Maddin.

Del Toro maintains homes in Toronto and Los Angeles, and returns to his native Guadalajara every six weeks to visit his family. He also owns two houses devoted exclusively to his collection of books, poster artwork, and other belongings pertaining to his work. He explained, "As a kid, I dreamed of having a house with secret passages and a room where it rained 24 hours a day. The point of being over 40 is to fulfill the desires you've been harboring since you were 7."

=== Views ===
In a 2007 interview, del Toro described his political position as "a little too liberal". He pointed out that the villains in most of his films (such as the industrialist in Cronos, the Nazis in Hellboy, and the Francoists in Pan's Labyrinth) are united by the common attribute of authoritarianism: "I hate structure. I'm completely anti-structural in terms of believing in institutions. I hate them. I hate any institutionalized social, religious, or economic thing."

In 2009, del Toro signed a petition in support of director Roman Polanski after Polanski was detained while traveling to a Switzerland film festival in relation to his 1977 charges of drugging and raping a 13-year-old girl. The petition argued the arrest would undermine the tradition of film festivals as a place for works to be shown "freely and safely", and that arresting filmmakers traveling to neutral countries could open the door "for actions of which no-one can know the effects."

Raised Catholic, del Toro told Charlie Rose in a 2009 interview that his upbringing was excessively "morbid" and said, "I mercifully lapsed as a Catholic... but as Buñuel used to say, 'I'm an atheist, thank God.'" He insists that he is spiritually "not with Buñuel" and that he is "once a Catholic, always a Catholic, in a way". He concluded, "I believe in Man. I believe in mankind, as the worst and the best that has happened to this world." He has also responded to the claim that he views his art as his religion: "It is. To me, art and storytelling serve primal, spiritual functions in my daily life. Whether I'm telling a bedtime story to my kids or trying to mount a movie or write a short story or a novel, I take it very seriously." Nevertheless, he became a "raging atheist" after seeing a pile of human fetuses while volunteering at a Mexican hospital. He also said that he was horrified by the way the Catholic Church complied with Francoist Spain, and even had a character in one of his films quote what actual priests would say to Republican faction members in concentration camps. Upon discovering the religious beliefs of English writer C. S. Lewis, del Toro stated that he could no longer relate to Lewis and his work, despite having done so beforehand. He described Lewis as "too Catholic" for him, despite the fact that Lewis was never a Catholic.

Del Toro is not entirely disparaging of Catholicism, and his background continues to influence his work. While discussing The Shape of Water, he mentioned the Catholic influence on the film: "A very Catholic notion is the humble force, or the force of humility, that gets revealed as a god like figure toward the end. It's also used in fairy tales. In fairy tales, in fact, there is an entire strand of tales that would be encompassed by the title 'The Magical Fish'. And [it's] not exactly a secret that a fish is a Christian symbol." In the same interview, he said, "I don't think there is life beyond death, I don't. But I do believe that we get this clarity in the last minute of our life. The titles we achieved, the honors we managed, they all vanish. You are left alone with you and your deeds and the things you didn't do. And that moment of clarity gives you either peace or the most tremendous fear, because you finally have no cover, and you finally realize exactly who you are."

In an interview for his book and exhibition Guillermo del Toro at Home with Monsters, del Toro stated in 2016, "A lot of Mexican Catholic dogma, the way it's taught, it's about existing in a state of grace, which I found impossible to reconcile with the much darker view of the world and myself, even as a child. I couldn't make sense of impulses like rage or envy and, when I was older, more complex ones, you know. I felt there was a deep cleansing allowing for imperfection through the figure of a monster. Monsters are the patron saints of imperfection."

Del Toro has been publicly critical of the administration of Andrés Manuel López Obrador for its handling of public support for Mexican cinema. In May 2020 he joined other filmmakers in opposing a Morena proposal that abolished the Fondo de Inversión y Estímulos al Cine (Fidecine), which provided subsidies to the Mexican film industry. In November 2022 the Mexican Academy of Film Arts and Sciences postponed the 65th Ariel Awards, citing a serious financial crisis caused by a lack of resources; Del Toro reacted on Twitter, writing that "the systematic destruction of Mexican cinema and its institutions—which took decades to build—has been brutal", and comparing the López Obrador administration unfavorably with the government of José López Portillo (1976–1982). Del Toro also offered to finance the statuettes; the ceremony was externally funded and took place on 9 September 2023 in Guadalajara, Jalisco.

He is also highly skeptical of AI in filmmaking, telling the British Film Institute in September 2024, "I saw a demo of AI [being used for animation] and I thought, 'Oh, that's what people think animation is: giving prompts and the computer does it. [...] AI has demonstrated that it can do semi-compelling screensavers—that's essentially that. And I think the value of art is not how much it costs and how little effort it requires, it's how much you would risk to be in its presence. Are [screensavers] going to make [viewers] cry because they lost a son, a mother? Because they misspent their youth? No. [AI is] in the hands of people that don't think about it as a tool but as a solution. [...] It should be, if at all, optional." In an interview with NPR's Fresh Air, del Toro again expressed disinterest and skepticism in generative AI in film saying "The other day, somebody wrote me an email, said, 'What is your stance on AI?' And my answer was very short. I said, 'I'd rather die.'"

=== Interests ===
While studying at university, del Toro published his first book when he wrote a biography of English filmmaker Alfred Hitchcock, whom he has long praised and admired.

In 2010, del Toro revealed that he was a fan of video games, describing them as "the comic books of our time" and "a medium that gains no respect among the intelligentsia". He referred to the video games Ico and Shadow of the Colossus as masterpieces. He later cited Asteroids, Cosmology of Kyoto, Gadget: Invention, Travel, & Adventure, and Galaga as his personal favorite games.

Del Toro's favorite film monsters are Frankenstein's monster, the Xenomorph, Gill-man, Godzilla, and the Thing. Frankenstein in particular has a special meaning for him, in both film and literature, as he claims he has a "Frankenstein fetish to a degree that is unhealthy". He said, "It's the most important book of my life, so you know if I get to it, whenever I get to it, it will be the right way." He usually watches three films a day, and lists Brazil, Nosferatu, Freaks, and Bram Stoker's Dracula among his favorite horrors.

Del Toro is also a fan of Japanese manga and anime, having called the anime Doraemon "the greatest kids series ever created". He has cited Hayao Miyazaki as one of his influences and one of his favorite storytellers in any medium, having identified with his style and influence through his Toei Animation and Studio Ghibli projects like The Wonderful World of Puss 'n Boots, Heidi, Girl of the Alps, My Neighbor Totoro, and The Boy and the Heron from childhood to adulthood, praising how he evokes the emotion of recognizing an impossible beauty only existing in films and realistically depicting brutal themes that affect the best and the worst of humanity, deeming Miyazaki an entirely genuine one-of-a-kind creator who exists fully in his art.

Del Toro is highly interested in the culture of Victorian England. He said, "I have a room of my library at home called 'The Dickens Room'. It has every work by Charles Dickens, Wilkie Collins, and many other Victorian novelists, plus hundreds of works about Victorian London and its customs, etiquette, architecture. I'm a Jack the Ripper aficionado, too. My museum/home has a huge amount of Ripperology in it."

In 2019, del Toro paid for the flights of the Mexican teams to attend the 60th International Mathematical Olympiad (IMO) in South Africa and the United Kingdom, after the Mexican chapter of the IMO announced the government had suspended financing for the youngsters.

Del Toro has an honorary doctorate from the National Autonomous University of Mexico (UNAM). In November 2022, UNAM awarded him the Honoris Causa Doctorate for his "contributions to culture and his support for the youth".

=== Father's 1997 kidnapping ===
Del Toro's father, Federico del Toro Torres, was kidnapped in Guadalajara around 1997. Del Toro's family had to pay twice the amount originally asked for as a ransom ($1 million). Immediately after learning of the kidnapping, fellow filmmaker James Cameron, a friend of del Toro since they met after the production of Cronos, offered to help del Toro by paying for a negotiator ($250,000), which del Toro accepted (before reimbursing him later). 72 days after Federico was kidnapped, the ransom was paid and he was released. The culprits were never apprehended, nor was the money ever recovered. The event prompted del Toro, his parents, and his siblings to move abroad. In a 2011 interview with Time magazine, he mentioned the kidnapping of his father: "Every day, every week, something happens that reminds me that I am in involuntary exile [from my country]."

== Filmography ==
=== Film ===
Year	Title	Distributor
1992	Cronos	October Films
1997	Mimic	Miramax
2001	The Devil's Backbone	Warner Bros. Pictures / Sony Pictures Classics
2002	Blade II	New Line Cinema
2004	Hellboy	Sony Pictures Releasing
2006	Pan's Labyrinth	Warner Bros. Pictures
2008	Hellboy II: The Golden Army	Universal Pictures
2013	Pacific Rim	Warner Bros. Pictures
2015	Crimson Peak	Universal Pictures
2017	The Shape of Water	Fox Searchlight Pictures
2021	Nightmare Alley	Searchlight Pictures
2022	Pinocchio	Netflix
2025	Frankenstein	Netflix

=== Television ===
Year	Title	Distributor
2014–2017	The Strain	FX
2016–2018	Trollhunters: Tales of Arcadia	Netflix
2018–2019	3Below: Tales of Arcadia	Netflix
2020	Wizards: Tales of Arcadia	Netflix
2022	Guillermo del Toro's Cabinet of Curiosities	Netflix

== Bibliography ==
- Alfred Hitchcock (1990) in Spanish
- La invención de Cronos (1992) in Spanish
- Hellboy: The Golden Army Comic (2008) with Mike Mignola
- Hellboy II: The Art of the Movie (2008) with Mike Mignola
- The Monsters of Hellboy II (2008) with Mike Mignola
- The Strain (2009) with Chuck Hogan
- The Fall (2010) with Chuck Hogan
- Don't Be Afraid of the Dark: Blackwood's Guide to Dangerous Fairies (2011) with Christopher Golden
- The Night Eternal (2011) with Chuck Hogan
- Guillermo del Toro Cabinet of Curiosities: My Notebooks, Collections, and Other Obsessions (2013) with Marc Zicree
- Trollhunters (2015) with Daniel Kraus
- The Shape of Water (2018) with Daniel Kraus – winner of the 2019 Scribe Award for Best Adapted Novel
- At Home With Monsters (2019) with Jim Shedden
- Pan's Labyrinth: The Labyrinth of the Faun (2019) with Cornelia Funke
- The Hollow Ones (2020) with Chuck Hogan
- The Boy in the Iron Box (Note: This serialized novella consists of six books: "Falling Down", "The Pit and the Box", "The Hunted", "Risen", "Siege", and "Encounter".) (2024) with Chuck Hogan

Additionally, del Toro has written or co-written unproduced screenplays for adaptations of Justice League Dark (titled Dark Universe), Beauty and the Beast (titled Beauty), At the Mountains of Madness, The Count of Monte Cristo (titled The Left Hand of Darkness), Spanky (titled Mephisto's Bridge), Superstitious, The Coffin, Drood, The List of Seven, The Wind in the Willows, as well as ones for potential remakes of Fantastic Voyage and The Haunted Mansion.

== Awards and nominations ==
del Toro's films have been nominated for and won the following awards.

Year	Title	Academy Awards		BAFTA Awards		Golden Globe Awards	
Year	Title	Nominations	Wins	Nominations	Wins	Nominations	Wins
2006	Pan's Labyrinth	6	3	8	3	1	
2008	Hellboy II: The Golden Army	1					
2013	Pacific Rim			1			
2017	The Shape of Water	13	4	12	3	7	2
2021	Nightmare Alley	4		3			
2022	Guillermo del Toro's Pinocchio	1	1	3	1	3	1
2025	Frankenstein	9	3	8	3	5	
Total		34	11	36	7	16	3

Directed Academy Award performances
Under del Toro's direction, these actors have received Academy Award nominations for their performances in their respective roles.

Year	Performer	Film	Result
Academy Award for Best Actress
2017	Sally Hawkins	The Shape of Water	Nominated
Academy Award for Best Supporting Actor
2017	Richard Jenkins	The Shape of Water	Nominated
2025	Jacob Elordi	Frankenstein	Nominated
Academy Award for Best Supporting Actress
2017	Octavia Spencer	The Shape of Water	Nominated

== See also ==
- Cinema of Mexico
- Guillermo del Toro's unrealized projects
- List of Mexican Academy Award winners and nominees
- List of atheists in film, radio, television and theater
