= Superstitious (novel) =

1995 novel by R. L. Stine

- First edition cover of Superstitious
- Author: R. L. Stine
- Language: English
- Genre: Horror fiction
- Publisher: Grand Central Publishing
- Publication date: September 14, 1995
- Publication place: United States
- Media type: Print (paperback and hardcover)
- ISBN: 0-446-51953-7
- OCLC: 32510288
- Dewey Decimal: 813/.54 20
- LC Class: PS3569.T4837 S86 1995

Superstitious is a 1995 horror novel by author R. L. Stine. This was the first adult novel by Stine, most famous for writing children's fiction such as the Goosebumps series. This book deals with Sara Morgan, who falls in love with Liam O'Connor. It was published on September 14, 1995 by Grand Central Publishing in the United States.

R. L. Stine began writing this book after an agent offered him a one million dollar advance. It took him four months to write.

== Plot summary ==
Sara Morgan, a graduate student who has left an abusive relationship with Chip, starts a new relationship with a handsome professor named Liam O'Connor, who is extremely superstitious and lives with his sister Margaret, with whom he is very close. Sara does not mind these quirks and marries Liam. Shortly after, people start dying in grisly ways, and it turns out the professor knew all of them. Sara begins to wonder if her husband might be the killer, while Liam's superstitious behavior increases.

One day, after Sara discovers Margaret and Liam in bed together naked, she smashes the mirror out of protest and runs out of the house. She returns later to retrieve her keys only to find Margaret dead; she leaves afterwards in search of her boss' house. There, she spots her boss dead and Liam glaring at her. He explains to her that Margaret was his wife and that the demons of superstition living inside of him can pass through Sara to the child she bears. He went on to explain that when the demons slip away, they kill someone he knows; when Sara broke the mirror, the demons slipped out, murdering Margaret.

Sara, who wants to show Liam that there are no demons, shatters a mirror in the house; the demons slip outside of him, he says it is okay because with his death Sara will be safe, and they murder Liam. Sara is knocked out afterwards by the demons, and later awakens in the hospital. Sara then finds out she is pregnant, causing her to scream in horror.

== Reception ==
The novel was not as well received as his young adult novels, selling 150,000 in its first 8 months. Nonetheless, the book was featured on USA Today's bestseller list for 7 weeks, attaining a peak position of 80 and was a main selection of the Doubleday Book Club.

Sue-Ellen Beauregard from Booklist stated that "readers who can accept scary supernatural beings and evil demons as forces to be reckoned with will find this a satisfying, although somewhat superficial, page-turner". Barbara Hawkins from the School Library Journal stated that "the book is a long way from "Fear Street" (Pocket), and sure to be as popular".

Douglas E. Winter from The Washington Post stated that the book had a "tired plot" and was not good. Publishers Weekly stated that the book had a "crude yet functional casting, plotting and prose".

== Unrealized film adaptation ==
In 1995, Miramax bought the film rights for this book before it was published, with Brandon Tartikoff in negotiations to produce at the time. In 1997, Guillermo del Toro was hired to direct, but the film adaptation was never realized according R. L. Stine on his Twitter page.
