= Cronos (film) =

1992 film by Guillermo del Toro

- Theatrical release poster
- Directed by: Guillermo del Toro
- Written by: Guillermo del Toro
- Produced by: Arthur H. Gorson; Bertha Navarro; Alejandro Springall; Bernard L. Nussbaumer
- Starring: Federico Luppi; Ron Perlman; Claudio Brook; Margarita Isabel; Tamara Shanath
- Narrated by: Jorge Martínez de Hoyos
- Cinematography: Guillermo Navarro
- Edited by: Raúl Dávalos
- Music by: Javier Álvarez
- Production companies: Fondo de Fomento Cinematográfico; Instituto Mexicano de Cinematografía; Universidad de Guadalajara; Iguana Producciones; Ventana Films
- Distributed by: Prime Films S.L. (Spain); October Films (United States)
- Release dates: 27 November 1992 (XXV Muestra Internacional de Cine); 3 December 1993 (México)
- Running time: 92 minutes
- Country: Mexico
- Languages: Spanish; English
- Budget: $2 million
- Box office: $621,392

Cronos is a 1992 Mexican independent dark fantasy horror drama film written and directed by Guillermo del Toro and starring Federico Luppi and Ron Perlman. Cronos is del Toro's first feature film, and the first of several films on which he worked with Luppi and Perlman.

Critical reviews were overwhelmingly positive, praising the inventive direction and creative storytelling, and over time Cronos has been regarded as a classic. The film was selected as the Mexican entry for the Best Foreign Language Film at the 66th Academy Awards, but was not accepted as a nominee.

A stand-alone sequel, We Are What We Are, was released in 2010, its only connection to the original being Daniel Giménez Cacho reprising the role of Tito the Coroner.

== Plot ==
In the year 1536, an alchemist in Veracruz develops a mechanism that can give eternal life. In 1937, an old building collapses and the alchemist, who has marble-white skin, is killed when his heart is pierced by the debris. Investigators go to search the home of the alchemist, but they never reveal what else was discovered in the home: basins filled with blood from a corpse.

In 1996, an elderly antique dealer, Jesús Gris, notices that the base of an archangel statue is hollow. He opens it and finds the 460-year-old mechanism. After he winds the ornate, scarab-shaped device, it unfurls spider-like legs which grip him tightly and inserts a needle into his skin. An insect — entombed within the device and meshed with the internal clockwork — filters the blood. Gris eventually discovers his health and vigor are returning, as is his youth. His skin loses its wrinkles, his hair thickens and his sexual appetite increases. He also develops a thirst for blood. This initially disgusts him, but he eventually succumbs to the temptation. He uses the device later that night but says his nightly prayer as he does. His granddaughter Aurora notices this and begins to worry about Gris.

Meanwhile, a rich, dying businessman, Dieter de la Guardia, who has been amassing information about the mechanism for many years, has been searching for the statue with the device. He sends his thuggish American nephew Angel, who suffers his uncle's abuse on a daily basis for an inheritance, to purchase the statue at the antique shop.

During a New Year's Eve party, Gris sees a man bleeding from the nose and follows him into the men's room in order to reap his blood from the sink countertop. Another man comes out of one of the stalls, sees the blood and cleans it up. Gris notices blood on the floor and decides to lick it up, until an unknown man walks up and kicks him in the face, knocking him unconscious. He is found by Angel, who gives him some alcohol and tries to beat him into giving up the mechanism. When Gris faints, Angel places his body inside a car and pushes it off a cliff. Gris briefly awakens and prays for survival, but seemingly dies. He later revives in an undertaker's establishment and escapes before he can be cremated. He returns home, and Aurora lets him in. Dieter beats Angel for not ensuring Gris's heart was destroyed and sends him to check on the body. Gris writes a letter to his wife in which he comments on the changes to his body, and tells her that after completing some 'unfinished business' he will return to her. He notices that his skin burns in the presence of sunlight and sleeps in a box to avoid it.

Eventually, Gris and Aurora bring the mechanism to Dieter's headquarters, where the businessman offers him a "way out" in exchange for the device. Gris comments on his damaged skin and the businessman tells him to peel it off, since he has new skin underneath, which is marble-white like the dead alchemist. Gris threatens to destroy the mechanism, but Dieter warns him that he will die should that happen. Gris agrees to hand it over in exchange for knowing the "way out", whereupon Dieter stabs him. Before being able to strike the killing blow to the heart, Dieter is knocked and incapacitated by Aurora, and Gris feeds on Dieter. Angel finds the dying Dieter and crushes his throat with his foot, tired of his abuse and waiting for his inheritance. Angel confronts Gris on the rooftop of the building and beats him severely. Gris throws them both off the roof, killing Angel.

Aurora finds Gris unconscious and uses the mechanism to wake him. Noticing that her hand is bleeding, Gris is tempted to feed off his granddaughter, but he eventually controls himself. He then painfully destroys the mechanism, despite previous warnings. He returns to his home and is shown lying in bed, with Aurora and his wife in attendance, as he finally passes away.

== Cast ==
- Federico Luppi as Jesús Gris
- Ron Perlman as Angel
- Claudio Brook as Dieter de la Guardia
- Tamara Shanath as Aurora Gris
- Margarita Isabel as Mercedes Gris
- Daniel Giménez Cacho as Tito the Coroner, a character who also appears in the 2010 horror film We Are What We Are
- Mario Iván Martínez as Alchemist
- Farnesio de Bernal as Manuelito
- Jorge Martínez de Hoyos as Narrator

== Reception ==
=== Critical response ===
The film received acclaim by critics for its acting, originality, mythology, religious references, and its balance of horror & drama. When the film got the attention of international film critics including those from United States, it has since been recognized as one of the greatest horror films and Spanish language films of all-time. Rotten Tomatoes reports a 90% approval rating based on 60 reviews, with an average rating of 7.3/10. The critical consensus reads: "Guillermo del Toro's unique feature debut is not only gory and stylish, but also charming and intelligent." Metacritic assigned the film a weighted average score of 70 out of 100, based on 12 critics, indicating "generally favorable reviews". It was also entered into the 18th Moscow International Film Festival.

In the early 2010s, Time Out conducted a poll with several authors, directors, actors and critics who have worked within the horror genre to vote for their top horror films. Cronos was placed at number 96 on their top 100 list.

The film has become part of The Criterion Collection. The film's Blu-ray disc includes the film with both the introduction in English, and a version in its original Spanish language. In the website's plot synopsis of the film, it's described as "A dark, visually rich, & emotionally captivating fantasy". The film is sold both individually and as part of the box set Trilogía de Guillermo del Toro, which includes del Toro's other Spanish language horror films The Devil's Backbone & Pan's Labyrinth.

=== Box office ===
In the United States, the film was given limited release to only 2 theaters where it grossed $17,538 its opening weekend and grossed a total of $621,392 playing at a total of 28 screens. After many critics viewed the film, they felt it deserved a wider release.

=== Year-end lists ===
- Honorable mention – David Elliott, The San Diego Union-Tribune

== Home media ==
Cronos was first released on DVD by Lionsgate Home Entertainment on 14 October 2003 as a "10th Anniversary Edition", which includes two commentaries, one by del Toro, and the other by three of the four producers, two behind-the-scenes featurettes, two galleries for production photos and concept art, and an easter egg which plays the theatrical trailers of four films, including Cronos. On 7 December 2010, The Criterion Collection released Cronos on both DVD and Blu-ray with a new cover by Mike Mignola. The disc contains two audio commentaries by cast and crew, a video tour of del Toro's home office, several interviews, and Geometria, a 1987 short film (although finished in 2010) written and directed by del Toro. The Criterion Collection also released the film as a part of the boxset Trilogía de Guillermo del Toro, which includes three of Guillermo del Toro's Spanish films, the other two being Pan's Labyrinth and The Devil's Backbone.

== See also ==
- Vampire film
- List of submissions to the 66th Academy Awards for Best Foreign Language Film
- List of Mexican submissions for the Academy Award for Best Foreign Language Film
