= The Devil's Backbone =

2001 film by Guillermo del Toro

- Spanish theatrical release poster
- Spanish: El espinazo del diablo
- Directed by: Guillermo del Toro
- Written by: Guillermo del Toro; David Muñoz; Antonio Trashorras
- Produced by: Agustín Almodóvar; Bertha Navarro
- Starring: Marisa Paredes; Eduardo Noriega; Federico Luppi; Irene Visedo; Fernando Tielve; Íñigo Garcés
- Narrated by: Federico Luppi
- Cinematography: Guillermo Navarro
- Edited by: Luis De La Madrid
- Music by: Javier Navarrete
- Production companies: El Deseo, S.A.; Tequila Gang; Sogepaq; Canal+ España; Anhelo Producciones
- Distributed by: Warner Sogefilms (Spain); 20th Century Fox (Mexico)
- Release date: 20 April 2001 (Spain)
- Running time: 108 minutes
- Countries: Spain; Mexico
- Language: Spanish
- Budget: US$4.5 million
- Box office: US$6.5 million

The Devil's Backbone (Spanish: El espinazo del diablo) is a 2001 Spanish-language gothic horror film directed by Guillermo del Toro, and written by del Toro, David Muñoz, and Antonio Trashorras. Set in Spain, 1939, during the final year of the Spanish Civil War, the film follows a boy who is left in an orphanage operated by Republican loyalists and haunted by the ghost of a recently deceased boy. It stars Marisa Paredes, Eduardo Noriega, Federico Luppi, Irene Visedo, Fernando Tielve in his film debut, and Íñigo Garcés. Released in Spain by Warner Sogefilms on 20 April 2001, the film received mostly positive reviews from critics.

== Plot ==
Casares, a doctor, and his friend's widowed wife, Carmen, operate a small orphanage in a remote part of Spain during the Spanish Civil War. Helping the couple are Jacinto, the groundskeeper (and former orphan) and his fiancée Conchita, a teacher. Casares and Carmen support the Republican loyalists, hiding a large cache of gold being used to back the Republican treasury. The orphanage has been subject to attacks from Francisco Franco's troops, and an inert bomb sits in the courtyard.

One day, an orphan named Carlos (unaware his father has been killed) arrives with Ayala and Domínguez, two loyalists. Casares and Carmen take in Carlos and soon he strikes up a friendship with Jaime, the orphanage bully, as well as Galvez and Owl. Carlos soon begins having visions of a mysterious entity and hears stories about a child named Santi who went missing on the day the bomb was dropped in the courtyard.

On his first night at the orphanage, Carlos is dared by Jaime to sneak into the kitchen for water after curfew; Carlos counters by daring Jaime to go with him. The boys reach the kitchen but Jaime hurries out after filling his pitcher, leaving Carlos alone. Carlos hears a whisper telling him that "many of you will die." Frightened, he rushes outside and is caught by Jacinto. The next morning, Casares asks who snuck out after curfew, but Carlos claims he went alone. This, as well as Carlos saving Jaime from falling in a cistern, earns him Jaime's friendship.

Jacinto knows of the gold hidden at the orphanage and uses his affair with Carmen as an opportunity to take her keys and search for the treasure. That night, the boys hear strange noises and Carlos decides to investigate. He sneaks out and encounters the pale figure of a young boy with a bleeding wound on his head, which causes him to run back into the building. Later, Carlos finds a drawing of a ghostly figure labeled "Santi", leading him to suspect that Jaime knows more than the other boys.

Casares sees that Ayala has been captured by the Nationalists. Fearing he will soon be tortured into revealing the gold's location at the orphanage, he convinces Carmen that they must evacuate the children immediately. Jacinto overhears the conversation and confronts Carmen, demanding the stash of gold and crassly bringing up their affair in front of Casares. Enraged, Casares points a gun at Jacinto and forces him to leave.

As the orphans and faculty prepare to leave, Conchita discovers Jacinto pouring gasoline around the kitchen. She shoots him in the arm after he mocks her, causing a furious Jacinto to start a fire before fleeing the building. Carmen and fellow teacher Alma attempt to put out the fire but fail to prevent an explosion; Alma is killed by the blast along with several of the children. Casares finds a mortally wounded Carmen inside the building and tearfully stays with her as she dies. He decides to remain in the charred orphanage with the surviving children, arming himself for Jacinto's return.

The following night, Jaime reveals to Carlos the details of Santi's disappearance: Jaime and Santi had been collecting slugs at the cistern when they spotted Jacinto attempting to open the safe where the gold was kept. Jaime managed to escape, but Jacinto cornered Santi and attempted to threaten him into keeping silent. In anger, Jacinto shoved Santi against a stone wall, giving him a severe head injury and sending him into shock. A panicked Jacinto then tied stones to Santi before sinking his body in the cistern. A terrified Jaime ran into the courtyard, only to have the bomb land several feet from him moments later.

Jaime insists that he is no longer scared of Jacinto and will kill him if he returns. Conchita attempts to walk to the nearest town for help when she encounters Jacinto and two associates driving back to the orphanage to claim the gold. Jacinto threatens her with a knife, telling her to apologize for shooting him; but she says she is not scared of him, and he stabs her to death. Carlos has a final encounter with Santi's ghost, who he is no longer afraid of after hearing the circumstances of his death. The ghost quietly demands that Carlos bring Jacinto to him.

Casares dies of his injuries as Jacinto and his associates reach the orphanage and imprison the orphans while they search for the gold. The two other men eventually grow impatient and leave, but Jacinto finds and takes the stash. Jaime reveals Santi was murdered by Jacinto, encouraging the children to fight back. They fashion weapons from sharpened sticks and broken glass. The ghost of Casares then comes to free them from a locked door, leaving behind a monogrammed handkerchief. The children attack Jacinto in the cellar, finally pushing him into the cistern where he had dumped Santi's body. Weighed down by the gold he was carrying, Jacinto struggles to resurface but Santi's ghost appears and drags him to his death.

Carlos tearfully says goodbye to Casares, and the remaining children leave the orphanage and head to town. Casares' ghost watches them from the doorway.

== Cast ==
- Fernando Tielve as Carlos, an orphan. He is described by del Toro in the DVD commentary as a force of innocence. Tielve had originally auditioned as an extra before Guillermo del Toro decided to cast him as the lead. This was his film debut. Both Tielve and his co-star Iñigo Garcés had cameos as guerrilla soldiers later in Pan's Labyrinth (2006).
- Íñigo Garcés as Jaime, the orphanage bully who later befriends Carlos.
- Eduardo Noriega as Jacinto, the caretaker.
- Marisa Paredes as Carmen, the administrator of the orphanage.
- Federico Luppi as Dr. Casares, the orphanage doctor.
- Junio Valverde as Santi, an orphan who becomes a ghost.
- Irene Visedo as Conchita, Jacinto's fiancée, who Jaime has a secret crush on.
- Adrián Lamana, Javier González Sánchez and Daniel Esparza as Gálvez, Owl and Marcos, fellow orphans and part of Jamie's nighttime group.

== Production ==
It was independently produced by Agustín Almodóvar as an international co-production between Spain and Mexico, and was filmed in Madrid. Some of the interior scenes were filmed in Talamanca de Jarama. The scenes in the orphanage were filmed at the Colegio de San Fernando and the Cartujo monastery of Talamanca del Jarama.

Guillermo del Toro wrote the first draft before writing his debut film Cronos (1993). This "very different" version was set in the Mexican Revolution and focused not on a child's ghost but a "Christ with three arms". According to del Toro, and as drawn in his notebooks, there were many iterations of the story, some of which included antagonists who were a "doddering ... old man with a needle," a "desiccated" ghost with black eyes as a caretaker (instead of the living Jacinto who terrorizes the orphans), and "beings who are red from head to foot."

As mentioned in the "Spanish Gothic" interview on the DVD, the name of the movie was initially to be taken from the "Devil's Backbone" mountain range setting in Mexico; this was changed when the movie wound up being set in Spain. One scene showed jars of a liqueur the doctor owned, each containing spiced rum called “Limbo water”, preserving a fetus that died from spina bifida. The doctor said the drink was rumored to cure impotence and was sold to fund the school. This became the origin of the name.

As to motivation for the villain, according to the actor who portrayed him, Eduardo Noriega, Jacinto "suffered a lot when he was a child at this orphanage. Somebody probably treated him wickedly: this is his heritage. And then there is the brutalizing effect of the War." Noriega further notes that "What Guillermo did was to write a biography of Jacinto (which went into Jacinto's parents, what they did in life, and more) and gave it to me."

DDT Studios in Barcelona created the final version of the crying ghost (victim and avenger) Santi, with his temple that resembled cracked, aged porcelain.

== Reception ==
=== Critical response ===
On Rotten Tomatoes, the film has a 93% rating based on 120 reviews, with an average rating of 7.6/10. The website's critical consensus reads: "Creepily atmospheric and haunting, The Devil's Backbone is both a potent ghost story and an intelligent political allegory." On Metacritic, the film has a weighted average score of 78 out of 100 based on 30 critic reviews, indicating "generally favorable reviews".

Roger Ebert awarded the film three stars out of four and compared it favorably to The Others, another ghost story released later in the same year. Christopher Varney, of Film Threat, claimed: "That The Devil's Backbone makes any sense at all – with its many, swirling plotlines – seems like a little wonder." A. O. Scott, of The New York Times gave the film a positive review, and claimed: "The director, Guillermo del Toro, balances dread with tenderness, and refracts the terror and sadness of the time through the eyes of a young boy, who only half-understands what he is witnessing."

Steve Biodrowski from Cinefantastique Online described the film as "rich in texture, characterization and themes. Besides being genuinely creepy, it is also surprisingly moving. It is, quite probably (and this is not a back-handed compliment) the saddest horror movie ever made." He also praised the performances as well as the special effects, which he declared as "some of the best ever seen, easily matching work from the best US facilities; in fact, in at least one way they are even better."

The film was ranked at number 61 on Bravo's list 100 Scariest Movie Moments for its various scenes in which the ghost is seen. Bloody Disgusting ranked the film at number 18 in their list Top 20 Horror Films of the Decade, with the article calling the film "elegant and deeply-felt... it's alternately a gut-wrenching portrait of childhood in a time of war and a skin-crawling, evocative nightmare."

=== Awards and nominations ===
Award	Category	Nominee	Result	Ref.
ALMA Awards	Outstanding Foreign Film	The Devil's Backbone	Nominated	
Amsterdam Fantastic Film Festival	Silver Méliès Award	Guillermo del Toro	Won	
Cinénygma - Luxembourg International Film Festival	Grand Prize of European Fantasy; Film in Gold	Guillermo del Toro	Nominated	
Fangoria Chainsaw Awards	Best Limited Release Film	The Devil's Backbone	Nominated	
Fangoria Chainsaw Awards	Best Supporting Actor	Federico Luppi	Nominated	
Fangoria Chainsaw Awards	Best Screenplay	Guillermo del Toro, Antonio Trashorras, David Muñoz	Nominated	
Fangoria Chainsaw Awards	Best Score	Javier Navarrete	Nominated	
Fotogramas de Plata	Best Movie Actor	Eduardo Noriega	Nominated	
Gérardmer Film Festival	Special Jury Prize	Guillermo del Toro	Won	
Gérardmer Film Festival	Youth Jury Grand Prize	Guillermo del Toro	Won	
Gérardmer Film Festival	International Critics Award	Guillermo del Toro	Won	
Goya Awards	Best Costume Design	José Vico	Nominated	
Goya Awards	Best Special Effects	Reyes Abades, Carmen Aguirre, David Martí, Alfonso Nieto, Montse Ribé, Emilio Ruiz del Río	Nominated	
International Horror Guild Awards	Best Movie	The Devil's Backbone	Nominated	
MTV Movie Awards Mexico	Best Mexican Working in a Foreign Movie	Guillermo del Toro	Won	
Saturn Awards	Best Horror Film	The Devil's Backbone	Nominated	
Young Artist Awards	Best Young Actor in an International Film	Fernando Tielve	Won	

== See also ==
- List of Spanish films of 2001
- List of ghost films
